= Special Response Battalion =

Law enforcement agency in Bangladesh

Special Response Battalion স্পেশাল রেসপন্স ব্যাটালিয়ন
- Emblem of Special Response Battalion
- Abbreviation: SRB
- Motto: বাংলাদেশ আমার অহংকার; Bangladesh is my pride

Agency overview
- Formed: 15 September 2026; 60 days ago
- Preceding agency: Rapid Action Battalion
- Employees: Approx. 12,000
- Legal personality: Statutory body

Jurisdictional structure
- National agency: Bangladesh
- Operations jurisdiction: Bangladesh
- Area: 148,460 km^{2} (57,320 sq mi)
- Population: 171 million
- Governing body: Ministry of Home Affairs
- Constituting instrument: Special Response Battalion (SRB) Act, 2026
- General nature: Gendarmerie
- Specialist jurisdiction: Counter terrorism, special weapons operations; protection of internationally protected persons, other very important persons, or state property

Operational structure
- Headquarters: Kurmitola, Dhaka, Bangladesh
- Minister responsible: Salahuddin Ahmed, Minister of Home Affairs
- Agency executive: Addl. IGP Faruk Ahmed, Director General
- Parent agency: Bangladesh Police
- Child agency: Special Response Battalion 1-15; Administration & Finance Wing; Operations Wing; Intelligence Wing; Air Wing; Legal & Media Wing; Investigation & Forensic Wing; Communication & MIS Wing; Training & Orientation Wing; SRB Forces Training School; Research & Development Cell

Facilities
- Battalions: 15
- Armored vehicles: Otokar Cobra, IAG Guardian, STREIT Typhoon
- Helicopters: Bell 407

The Special Response Battalion (abbreviated as SRB) is a specialized law enforcement agency of the Bangladesh Police which was established to replace the dissolved Rapid Action Battalion (RAB). The Special Response Battalion (SRB) Bill, 2026 was passed by voice vote on 10 September 2026, during the third session of the 13th Jatiya Sangsad, which officially dissolved RAB. The draft of the law had previously received in-principle and final approval during a cabinet meeting held at the Secretariat on 17 August 2026, chaired by Prime Minister Tarique Rahman. According to the passed legislation, the new force will operate as a specialized unit under the Bangladesh Police.

== Background ==
The Rapid Action Battalion (RAB) was formed on 26 March 2004, during the then BNP-Jamaat coalition government, as a special police unit aimed at combating militancy and terrorism. It officially commenced operations on 14 April of the same year. Since its establishment, RAB had been operating under the Armed Police Battalion (Amendment) Act of 2003. This "elite force," which consisted of members from the Bangladesh Police, Bangladesh Army, Bangladesh Navy, Bangladesh Air Force, Border Guard Bangladesh, Bangladesh Ansar and Bangladesh Administrative Service was involved in various anti-crime operations for over two decades. However, it also faced widespread domestic and international criticism over allegations of enforced disappearances, extrajudicial killings, and human rights violations.

Following the shift in power during the July Uprising in 2024, pressure intensified to review RAB's activities. Various groups, including the commission investigating enforced disappearances and a United Nations fact-finding mission, recommended the dissolution of RAB. On 3 February 2026, former adviser Lt Gen (retd) Jahangir Alam Chowdhury of the interim government announced that the name and uniform of RAB will be changed, the agency will be renamed subsequently as the Special Intervention Force (SIF), with the approval of the chief adviser, which was not issued at that period. Consequently, the Ministry of Home Affairs published a draft of the SRB Act on its website on 4 August 2026 to gather public opinion.

== History ==
=== Draft ===
On 17 August 2026, a cabinet meeting chaired by Prime Minister Tarique Rahman at the Secretariat gave final approval to the draft of the "Special Response Battalion (SRB) Act, 2026," subject to vetting by the Legislative and Parliamentary Affairs Division. Subsequently, the bill was introduced in the Jatiya Sangsad and referred to the Parliamentary Standing Committee on the Ministry of Home Affairs for scrutiny. The standing committee recommended presenting the finalized bill to parliament in an amended form.

=== Act Passed ===
On 10 September 2026, during the third session of the 13th Jatiya Sangsad, Home Minister Salahuddin Ahmed proposed passing the bill, which Speaker Hafizuddin Ahmed declared passed by voice vote. At the same time, the Armed Police Battalion (APBn) Bill-2026 was also introduced separately in parliament. With the enactment of the new law, the existing legal framework concerning RAB was dissolved; however, prior departmental proceedings rules will remain in effect with necessary adaptations until new regulations are drafted.

The passed legislation includes provisions for transferring RAB's manpower, orders, powers, authority, privileges, funds, properties, accounts, records, and other related assets to the SRB. Thus, while the new law replaces RAB's legal framework, the operational assets, personnel, and institutional responsibilities of the unit remain fundamentally unchanged under the newly formed entity.

=== Formation ===
According to the act, the headquarters of the SRB will be located in Dhaka, though units may be established elsewhere in the country with government approval if necessary. The law permits the formation of battalions, companies, platoons, and sections according to the requirements of the force.

The force will be led by a Director General (DG), who will be appointed from among police officers holding the rank of Additional Inspector General of Police (Additional IGP) or above. Subject to the general oversight of the Inspector General of Police (IGP), the Director General will exercise administrative, financial, and operational authority.

The SRB will consist of police officers, members of disciplined forces, and designated armed personnel or employees appointed through direct recruitment or deputation. The duration of deputation or attachment will typically be set for a minimum of two years. The unit will have its own distinctive flag, emblem, and uniform.

=== Reactions ===
The initiative to rename and restructure the force has elicited mixed reactions from experts. Some argue that merely changing the name will not restore public confidence; instead, it is essential to eliminate political interference and establish a genuine culture of accountability. Former Director General of RAB, AKM Shahidur Rahman, previously remarked that the decision to dissolve the force rests solely within the government's jurisdiction.

== Location ==
SRB has 15 battalions spread all over the country. Among them, 5 are located in Dhaka. The units are located as follows:

Battalion Name	Battalion HQ	Jurisdiction
SRB-1	Uttara, Dhaka	Dhakshinkhan, Uttar Khan, Turag, Uttara, Dhaka Airport, Gulshan, Banani, Bhatara, Rupganj, Khilkhet, Gazipur
SRB-2	Agargaon, Dhaka	Tejgaon, Mohammadpur, Adabar, Dhanmondi, Kalabagan, Sher-e-Bangla Nagar, New Market, Hazaribagh
SRB-3	Tikatuli, Dhaka	Motijheel, Mugda, Shahjahanpur, Paltan, Khilgaon, Sabujbagh, Rampura, Hatirjheel, Shahbag, Ramna
SRB-4	Mirpur, Dhaka	Mirpur, Shah Ali, Pallabi, Darus Salam, Kafrul, Bhashantek, Cantonment, Savar, Ashulia, Dhamrai, Manikganj
SRB-5	Kashiadanga, Rajshahi	Rajshahi, Chapai Nawabganj, Natore, Naogaon, Joypurhat
SRB-6	Labanchara, Khulna	Khulna, Bagerhat, Satkhira, Jashore, Narail, Magura, Jhenaidah, Gopalganj
SRB-7	Patenga, Chattogram	Chattogram, Feni, Khagrachhari, Rangamati
SRB-8	Rupatali, Barishal	Barisal Division, Shariatpur, Madaripur
SRB-9	South Surma, Sylhet	Sylhet Division, Brahmanbaria
SRB-10	Keraniganj, Dhaka	Demra, Jatrabari, Shyampur, Kadamtali, Sutrapur, Wari, Kotwali, Lalbagh, Kamrangirchar, Chowkbazar, Bangsal, Gendaria, Dohar, Nawabganj, Keraniganj, Sirajdikhan, Louhajang, Sreenagar, Rajbari, Faridpur
SRB-11	Siddhirganj, Narayanganj	Lakshmipur, Noakhali, Cumilla, Chandpur, Narayanganj, Tongibari, Gazaria, Munshiganj Sadar
SRB-12	Salanga, Sirajganj	Sirajganj, Pabna, Bogura, Kushtia, Meherpur, Chuadanga
SRB-13	Kotwali, Rangpur	Rangpur Division
SRB-14	Mymensingh	Mymensingh, Kishoreganj, Tangail, Raomari, Char Rajibpur
SRB-15	Cox's Bazar	Cox's Bazar, Bandarban

== Organization ==
SRB has the following administrative wings under the SRB HQ:

Administration & Finance Superwing

- General Administration Wing
  - Personnel Sub-branch
  - Headquarters Branch
  - Transport Branch
  - Medical Sub-Branch
  - Development Sub-branch
  - Record Sub-Branch
  - General Sub-Branch
  - Central Workshop Branch
  - Health Unit
- Finance Wing
  - Procurement Branch
  - Accounts and Budget Branch
  - Personnel & Discipline Branch
  - Logistics & Supply Branch

Operations Wing

- Central Operations Branch
- Planning, Co-ordination & Monitoring Cell
- Dog Squad
- Bomb Disposal Unit

Intelligence Wing

- Information Gathering Cell
- Undercover Surveillance Unit
- Counter Intelligence Cell
- Communication Interception Cell

Legal & Media Wing

- Legal Cell
- Media Cell
- Human Rights Cell
- Internal Investigation Cell

Communication & MIS Wing

- Internal Communication Network Branch
  - Networking System Section
  - Video Conferencing System Section
  - Digital VHF Communication System Section
  - Video Backpack System Section
- Database & Information Services Branch
  - Vehicle Tracking System (VTS)
  - E-Services Section
  - Criminal Database Section
  - Prison Inmate Database Section
  - Report 2 RAB Section

Investigation & Forensic Wing

- Investigation Branch
- Forensic Branch

Air Wing

- Aerial Surveillance & Imaging Unit
- Search & Rescue Unit
- Aerial Patrol Unit
- Counter Terrorism Operations Unit
- Transport Operations Unit

Training & Orientation Wing

- Primary Training Course Section
- Anti-Terrorism Course Section
- Basic Intelligence Course Section
- Basic Investigation Course Section
- Primary Driving Course Section
- Basic Computer Course Section

SRB Forces Training School

- RAB Orientation Course
- Intelligence Course
- RAB Advance Course
- MT Driving Course
- Motorcycle Riding Course
- Kote and Magazine Management Course

Research & Development Cell

1. The Admin & Finance Superwing is overseen directly by the Additional Director General (Administration) holding the rank of DIGP.
2. Each Wing is directed by a Deputy Director General of the rank of ADIGP / Col. or equivalent holding the designation of Wing Director (WD).
3. Each Branch is headed by a Director of the rank of SP / Lt. Col. or equivalent holding the designation of Chief Executive Officer (CEO).
4. Each Cell / Sub-branch / Section / Unit is headed by a Deputy Director of the rank of Addl SP / Maj. or equivalent holding the designation of Special Officer-in-Charge (SOIC).

Notabene: Only the R & D Cell and the Cells under the Legal & Media Wing are headed by Directors of the rank of SP / Lt. Col. or equivalent holding the designation of Cell CEO.

== Rank Structure ==
SRB is composed of personnel from Police, Intelligence, Administrative Service and the Military & Paramilitary.

Superior officers

Rank group	General/Flag officers		Senior officers			Junior officers
Special Response Battalion	Commandant General (Director General)	Deputy Commandant General (Additional Director General)	Senior Commandant/Deputy Director General (Wing Director)	Commandant - Jr. Grade/Director (Jt Wing Director/Bn CO/CEO - Branch)	Deputy Commandant/Deputy Director (SOIC - Cell/Bn 2IC/Coy Cdr/Sqn Cdr/Bn Law Offr)	Assistant Commandant/Assistant Director (Executive Magistrate/Bn Adjt/Bn QM/Bn Ops Offr/Coy 2IC/Bn Intel Offr/Bn Media Offr/Bn Medical Offr)
Special Response Battalion	Addl IGP/Maj Gen/Air Mshl/RAdm	DIGP/Brig Gen/Air Cdre/Cdre	Addl DIGP/Col/Gp Capt/Capt	SP/Lt Col/Wg Cdr/Cdr	Addl SP/Maj/Sqn Ldr/Lt Cdr	AC/ASP/Capt/Flt Lt/Lt
Grade	1	2	3	4	5	7

Subordinate officers

Rank group	First-Class Gazetted Officers	Subordinate Personnel				Enlisted
Special Response Battalion	Deputy Assistant Director	Associate Inspector/Armed Sub-Inspector	Armed Assistant Sub-Inspector	Head Constable	Leading Constable	Armed Constable
Special Response Battalion	PI/Hon Lt	JCO (Sub/WO/CPO)/SIP	ASIP/Sgt Maj/PO	Havildar/Sgt	PN/Nk/Cpl/LCpl	PC/Sepoy
Grade	8 & 9	9 & 10	11	12	13 & 14	16 & 17

== List of Director General ==
No.	Name	Image	Took office	Left office	Tenure	Ref.
1	Md. Ahsan Habib Palash		15 September 2026	3 November	60 days	
2	Faruk Ahmed		3 November 2026	Incumbent	11 days	

== Powers and jurisdiction ==
Following the Code of Criminal Procedure, the SRB is empowered to conduct criminal investigations, searches, arrests, and seizures, as outlined in the passed legislation. Furthermore, the unit will maintain its own lock-up, evidence room (malkhana), and interrogation centers.

== Accountability and grievance redressal ==
In response to the human rights violation allegations raised against its predecessor RAB, the new law includes a provision for establishing a grievance redressal committee composed of various stakeholders. This committee is tasked with resolving public complaints as well as internal disputes among force members. According to government sources, one of the primary objectives behind forming the new force is to make law enforcement activities more transparent, accountable, and people-oriented.

== See also ==
- Rapid Action Battalion
- Bangladesh Police
- Ministry of Home Affairs (Bangladesh)
