= Rapid Action Battalion =

Law enforcement agency in Bangladesh

Rapid Action Battalion র‍্যাপিড অ্যাকশন ব্যাটালিয়ন
- Emblem of Rapid Action Battalion
- Abbreviation: RAB
- Motto: বাংলাদেশ আমার অহংকার; Bangladesh is my pride

Agency overview
- Formed: 26 March 2004; 22 years ago
- Dissolved: 15 September 2026; 2 months ago
- Superseding agency: Special Response Battalion
- Employees: Approx. 12,000

Jurisdictional structure
- National agency: Bangladesh
- Operations jurisdiction: Bangladesh
- Area: 148,460 km^{2} (57,320 sq mi)
- Population: 162 million
- Governing body: Ministry of Home Affairs
- Constituting instrument: The Police Act, 1861
- General nature: Gendarmerie

Operational structure
- Headquarters: Kurmitola, Dhaka
- Parent agency: Bangladesh Police
- Child agency: Intelligence Wing of the Rapid Action Battalion
- Functions: 5: Counter-Terrorism; Anti-Smuggling Operations; Enforcement Operations; Detention Operations; Tax Collection

Facilities
- Battalions: 15
- Armored vehicles: Otokar Cobra, IAG Guardian, STREIT Typhoon
- Helicopters: Bell 407

Website
- Official website

The Rapid Action Battalion (Bengali: র‍্যাপিড অ্যাকশন ব্যাটালিয়ন; abbreviated as RAB) was a law enforcement agency in Bangladesh tasked with combating organised crime and terrorism. Operating under the Ministry of Home Affairs, RAB was a composite force comprising personnel from the Police, Army, Navy, Air Force, and intelligence agencies.

Since its establishment in 2004, RAB has played a key role in counter-terrorism, anti-drug operations, and high-profile criminal investigations, but it has faced criticism from human rights groups for their alleged involvement in extrajudicial killings and enforced disappearances. It is estimated that between 2004 and 2008, RAB had killed 1,062 people.

In August 2026, the Ministry of Home Affairs proposed to replace it with the Special Response Battalion under the Special Response Battalion (SRB) Act, 2026. It was officially dissolved by a government gazette notification on 15 September 2026, leading to the formation of Special Response Battalion.

== History ==
=== 2003–2008 ===
The Rapid Action Battalion was formed on 12 July 2003 under the Armed Police Battalion (Amendment) Act, 2003. The act was passed through the amendment of the Armed Forces Battalion Ordinance 1979, which provides immunity to RAB officers for actions taken in the course of their duty. Each RAB battalion is commanded by an Assistant Inspector General of Police - AIGP (SP - SG) or an equivalent officer from other forces. RAB cannot file cases with the courts themselves, but they can forward the cases to Bangladesh Police, who can file the case with the courts. RAB is composed of personnel from Bangladeshi military and law enforcement agencies who return to their own units after their service with RAB ends.

RAB replaced the short-lived Rapid Action Team (RAT), which was formed in January 2003. RAB has faced criticism for alleged extrajudicial killings since its formation. In an editorial on 23 July 2004, The Daily Star wrote "reign it in before it turns into a [RABid] monster." RAB was provided weapons seized from the 10-Truck Arms and Ammunition Haul in Chittagong on 16 April 2004. RAB has a media centre in Karwan Bazar.

On 15 July 2004, RAB arrested Sumon Ahmed Majumder, a Jubo League leader and garment trader, in Tongi. He died within 10 hours of being arrested from torture at RAB headquarters in Uttara. He was a witness to the murder of Ahsanullah Master, a member of parliament from Awami League. Police claimed he died while resisting arrest while RAB claimed he was lynched by the general public. Police refused to take a complaint from his father.

On 30 May 2005, RAB arrested Abul Kalam Azad Sumon, a tailor and Chhatra League activist from Dhaka, along with two others. He was killed soon after. He had been shot six times and his body showed signs of torture. According to his mother, Sumon had switched from Bangladesh Nationalist Party to Awami League, which angered his local member of parliament, Mirza Abbas.

On 8 March 2006, RAB detained Md. Masudur Rahman, a businessman and activist of Jubo League from Dhaka. His body was found with signs of torture and bullet wounds the next day.

On 24 January 2007, journalist Jahangir Alam Akash was detained and tortured by RAB-5 in Rajshahi by Major Rashidul Hassan Rashid.

On 15 July 2008, Moshiul Alam Sentu of Bangladesh Jatiotabadi Chatra Dal was detained by Rapid Action Battalion from Dhaka, and his body was found the next day in a paddy field in Barisal. According to RAB, he died in a crossfire, but later, evidence showed that his body had signs of torture. Dr. Mizanur Rahman Tutul, leader of the insurgent Purbo Banglar Communist Party, was detained on 26 July and his body was recovered the next day.

=== 2009–2018 ===
Shafique Ahmed, Minister of Law, defended RAB to Human Rights Watch by saying RAB only killed criminals in 2009. On 28 May, Moshin Sheikh, and Ali Jinnah, students of Dhaka Polytechnic Institute, were killed in crossfire by RAB. On 22 October, F. M. Masum, a reporter of the New Age, was beaten up after he hesitated to open the door for plainclothes RAB officers who were assaulting his landlord's wife. The officers had said he deserved to be beaten for working for Nurul Kabir, editor of New Age. Bangladesh Air Force Officer Anisur Rahman, on deputation to RAB, was found guilty of torture by RAB's own internal investigation; he was sent back to the air force and no further action was taken. RAB-1 led by Flight Lieutenant Raihan Asgar Khan killed Kaiser Mahmud Bappi due to crossfire. On 13 November, Lutfar Rahman Khalashi, and Khairul Huq Khalashi, two brothers and businessmen, were detained by RAB from Narayanganj District. Their family organised a press conference and protest asking that they not be killed in a crossfire. They were killed in a crossfire on 16 November. the Bangladesh High Court expressed concern over the death of the two brothers.

On 3 February, Mohiuddin Arif, a technician at Apollo Hospital Dhaka was detained and tortured in custody by RAB. He later died from injuries. Azad Hussein Pappu, and Abdus Sattar were detained on 27 February and killed the next day due to crossfire by RAB on 28 February 2010. On 22 March 2010, Bangladesh Police stopped a photo exhibition on deaths by RAB at Drik Picture Library by Shahidul Alam.

Mohammad Rafiqul Islam, a salesman and member of extremist Allahr Dol, was forcibly disappeared by RAB in February. RAB detained the Asian Human Rights Commission representative, William Gomes, and tortured him at their headquarters on 21 May 2011. Limon Hossain, a 16-year-old student of Jhalokati College, was shot by RAB and his leg was amputated on 23 March 2011. Hossain was assaulted by informants of RAB on 20 August 2012. Rasal Ahmed Bhutto, was detained on 3 March and killed due to crossfire a week later. On 4 November 2011, Colonel Zulfiqar Ali Majumder led members of his unit, Rapid Action Battalion-7, to Talsara Darbar Sharif and robbed the compound keeping the pir at gunpoint. They stole 27 million BDT from the shrine. Four months later, a driver of the shrine sued 10 members of Rapid Action Battalion and two informants for the robbery.

On 5 March 2012, RAB told Mohammad Imam Hassan's family members that they rescued him and demanded a bribe for his release. Despite a bribe being paid, he has not been seen since then.

On 11 May 2013, Mohammad Fokhrul Islam, a businessman, was the victim of enforced disappearance by RAB. His family members were warned by RAB with enforced disappearance not to talk about the issue. On 27 November 2013, Saiful Islam Hiru, former MP and politician of the Bangladesh Nationalist Party, and Mohammad Humayun Kabir Parvez, a politician, disappeared after being detained by RAB led by Lieutenant Colonel Tareque Sayeed. RAB was involved in the enforced disappearance of Adnan Chowdhury, a politician of Bangladesh Nationalist Party, on 5 December. The police refused to take a case from Chowdhury's father, which mentioned RAB.

In Narayanganj, rogue RAB-11 officers led by Lieutenant Colonel Tareque Sayeed abducted and killed seven men in April 2014.

On 10 March 2015, RAB vehicles were seen when Salahuddin Ahmed, a politician of the Bangladesh Nationalist Party was a victim of forced disappearances by law enforcement agencies.

In March 2017, Intelligence Wing chief Lieutenant Colonel Abul Kalam Azad was killed in a bomb blast in Sylhet while raiding an ISIS hideout.

=== 2018–2023 ===
RAB detained three business partners of Major General Tarique Ahmed Siddique, the defence advisor to Prime Minister Sheikh Hasina, in January 2019. One of whom, retired Army captain Johirul Haque Khandaker, died eight months later in custody. Human Rights Watch described the detention as the result of a business dispute.

A cyber unit of RAB-3 identified Ahmed Kabir Kishore, Mushtaq Ahmed, Didarul Bhuiyan, activist, and Minhaz Mannan Emon as targets for publishing cartoons critical of the government and charged under the Digital Security Act in May 2020. They had been victims of enforced disappearance before being officially detained. Ahmed died in custody, where Kishore alleged they were tortured.

In 2021, Al Jazeera released a documentary called All the Prime Minister's Men in which the brother of the then Chief of Army, General Aziz Ahmed, bragged about RAB as his personal gangsters and thugs who make money for him and them through detentions.

In 2021, RAB manufactured and started using OIVS device to nab criminals.

In August 2022, Lieutenant Colonel Mohammad Ismail Hossain, air wing director, died after being injured in a helicopter crash. On 30 September, Director General of RAB, Chowdhury Abdullah Al-Mamun, was promoted and appointed Inspector General of Bangladesh Police. Chowdhury Abdullah Al-Mamun was under sanctions by the United States for human rights violations.

In 2023, Deutsche Welle published a documentary titled "Inside the Death Squad," which delved into the allegations of human rights abuses and extrajudicial killings committed by the RAB.

=== 2024–2026 ===
In November 2024, after the fall of Sheikh Hasina regime, it was reported that RAB was considering changing the unit's name, logo, and uniform.

In March 2025, RAB arrested Ataullah abu Ammar Jununi, commander of the Arakan Rohingya Salvation Army, along with five other terrorists in Narayanganj.

In May 2025, RAB ASP Palash Saha committed suicide inside of a RAB field office in Chittagong.

In June 2025, four men in RAB uniform stole nearly $100,000 worth of jackets in Uttara, Dhaka.

In August 2026 the ministry of home affairs have dissolved and replace it with Special Response Battalion.

== Location ==
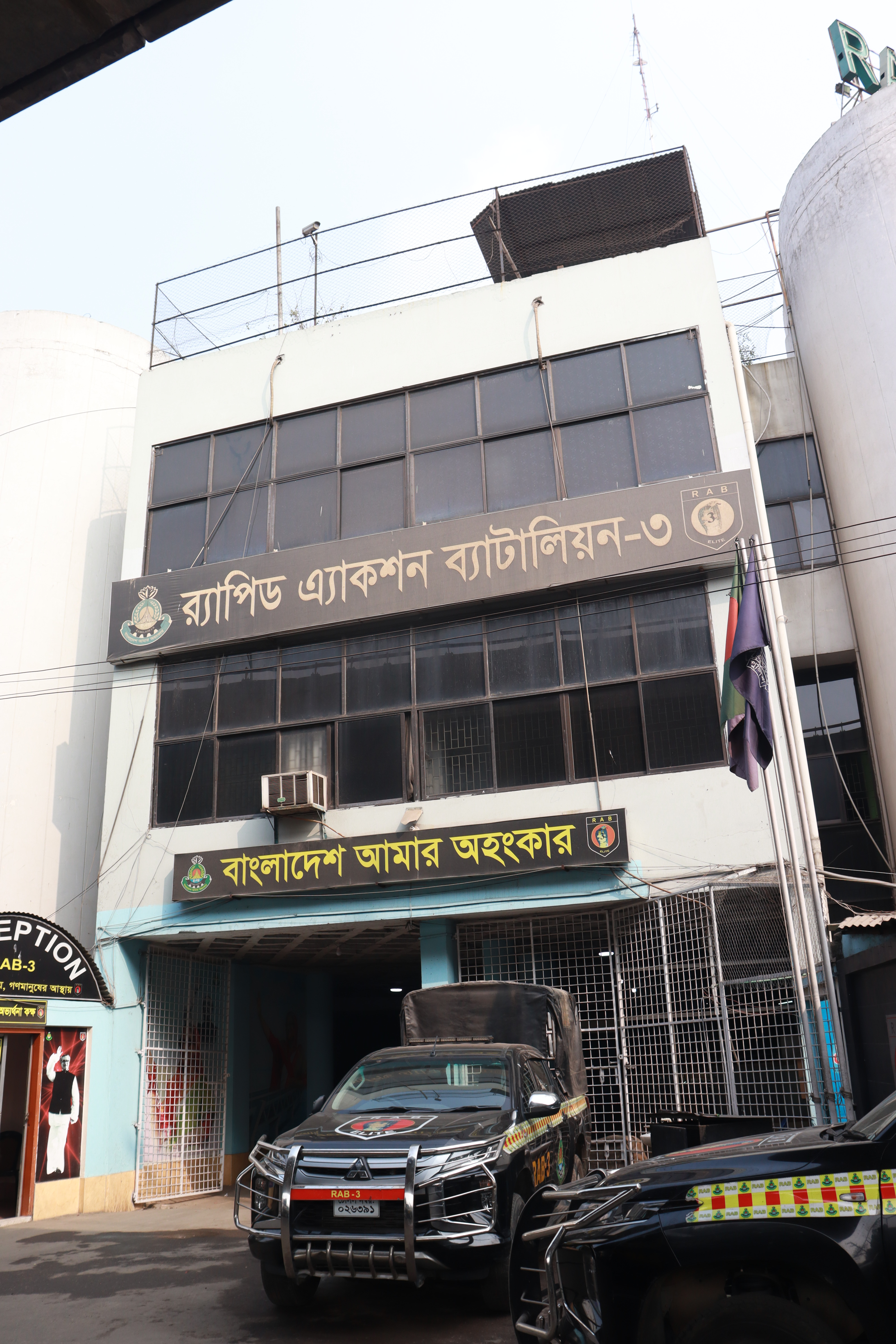
RAB headquarter in Tikatuli

RAB also has 15 battalions spread all over the country. Among them, 5 are located in Dhaka. The units are located as follows:

Battalion Name	Battalion HQ	Jurisdiction
RAB-1	Uttara, Dhaka	Dhakshinkhan, Uttar Khan, Turag, Uttara, Dhaka Airport, Gulshan, Banani, Bhatara, Rupganj, Khilkhet, Gazipur
RAB-2	Agargaon, Dhaka	Tejgaon, Mohammadpur, Adabar, Dhanmondi, Kalabagan, Sher-e-Bangla Nagar, New Market, Hazaribagh
RAB-3	Tikatuli, Dhaka	Motijheel, Mugda, Shahjahanpur, Paltan, Khilgaon, Sabujbagh, Rampura, Hatirjheel, Shahbag, Ramna
RAB-4	Mirpur, Dhaka	Mirpur, Shah Ali, Pallabi, Darus Salam, Kafrul, Bhashantek, Cantonment, Savar, Ashulia, Dhamrai, Manikganj
RAB-5	Kashiadanga, Rajshahi	Rajshahi, Chapai Nawabganj, Natore, Naogaon, Joypurhat
RAB-6	Labanchara, Khulna	Khulna, Bagerhat, Satkhira, Jashore, Narail, Magura, Jhenaidah, Gopalganj
RAB-7	Patenga, Chattogram	Chattogram, Feni, Khagrachhari, Rangamati
RAB-8	Rupatali, Barishal	Barisal Division, Shariatpur, Madaripur
RAB-9	South Surma, Sylhet	Sylhet Division, Brahmanbaria
RAB-10	Keraniganj, Dhaka	Demra, Jatrabari, Shyampur, Kadamtali, Sutrapur, Wari, Kotwali, Lalbagh, Kamrangirchar, Chowkbazar, Bangsal, Gendaria, Dohar, Nawabganj, Keraniganj, Sirajdikhan, Louhajang, Sreenagar, Rajbari, Faridpur
RAB-11	Siddhirganj, Narayanganj	Lakshmipur, Noakhali, Cumilla, Chandpur, Narayanganj, Tongibari, Gazaria, Munshiganj Sadar
RAB-12	Salanga, Sirajganj	Sirajganj, Pabna, Bogura, Kushtia, Meherpur, Chuadanga
RAB-13	Kotwali, Rangpur	Rangpur Division
RAB-14	Mymensingh	Mymensingh, Kishoreganj, Tangail, Raomari, Char Rajibpur
RAB-15	Cox's Bazar	Cox's Bazar, Bandarban

== Ranks and insignia ==
RAB is composed of officers and troops from Bangladesh Police and the Bangladesh Armed Forces. It was necessary to attribute a common rank insignia to RAB badges. Such insignia can be seen in the illustrations below.

Rab officers's Rank Badge

== Directors General ==
No.	Name	Image	Took office	Left office	Tenure	Ref.
1	Anwarul Iqbal		26 March 2004	24 April 2005	1 year, 29 days	
2	Abdul Aziz Sarkar		24 April 2005	2 November 2006	1 year, 192 days	
3	Khoda Baks Chowdhury		2 November 2006	3 November 2006	1 day	
4	SM Mizanur Rahman		3 November 2006	13 February 2007	102 days	
5	Baharul Alam		13 February 2007	20 February 2007	7 days	
6	Hasan Mahmud Khandaker		20 February 2007	30 August 2010	3 years, 196 days	
7	Md. Mokhleshur Rahman		30 August 2010	30 November 2014	4 years, 92 days	
8	Benazir Ahmed		7 January 2015	14 April 2020	5 years, 98 days	
9	Chowdhury Abdullah Al-Mamun		15 April 2020	29 September 2022	2 years, 167 days	
10	M Khurshid Hossain		30 September 2022	5 June 2024	1 year, 249 days	
11	Md. Harun Ur Rashid		5 June 2024	6 August 2024	62 days	
12	AKM Shahidur Rahman		7 August 2024	15 March 2026	1 year, 220 days	
13	Md. Ahsan Habib Palash		16 March 2026	10 September 2026	251 days	

== Notable arrests ==
The following is a table containing details of major arrests by the RAB according to their official website:

Name	Charge	Arrest	Source
Mufti Hannan	Terrorism	1 October 2005	
Pichchi Hannan	Terrorism	26 June 2004	
Debashis	Accomplice to Pichchi Hannan	24 June 2004	
Mollah Shamim	Murder	6 September 2004	
Shaheb Ali	Printing of Jihadi leaflets distributed during the 17 August 2005 bombings	17 September 2005	
Shahabuddin	Extortion	26 October 2004	
Syed Monir Hossain	Several criminal offences, including two murders	11 March 2005	
Shahjahan	Murder, rape and robbery	12 January 2005	
Rafiqul Islam	Suicide squad member in Narayanganj and JMB commander	27 December 2005	
Sumon Ahmed Majumder	Extortion	Unknown	
Ekramul Haque	Unknown	December 2005	
Ataullah abu Ammar Jununi	ARSA Leader	18 March 2025	

== Criticisms ==
Although the RAB has been successful in apprehending several high-profile terrorists, including the infamous Bangla Bhai, Human Rights Watch has accused RAB of numerous deaths, which have been attributed to crossfire. In March 2010, the battalion leader claimed 622 deaths were due to 'crossfire', while some human rights organisations claimed that more than 1,000 extrajudicial killings were the product of the battalion. Further, there have been many reports of torture in connection with the battalion's activities.

=== Extrajudicial killings ===
According to Human Rights Watch, members of Rapid Action Battalion have shot and killed women and children during public protests. Rights group describe it as a "death squad."

In 2017, a reporter from Swedish Radio recorded a high-ranking RAB officer explaining how the RAB selects people to kill, and how it kills people. They kill people who they suspect of serious crimes but consider too difficult to convict in a trial or impossible to rehabilitate. He said, "If you find him – shoot and kill him, wherever he is. And then plant a weapon beside him." This officer says that people disappear this way every day, and that innocent people can disappear.

=== Call for sanctions ===
On 27 October 2020, The United States Senate Foreign Relations Committee wrote a letter to the United States Secretary of State and United States Secretary of the Treasury, urging them to impose sanctions on senior officials of the Rapid Action Battalion for human rights violations.

=== Framing incidents ===
Limon Hossain, a college student at Jamaddarhat at Rajapur Upazila in Jhalokati, was shot by RAB personnel near his house on 23 March 2011, triggering a local and international outcry. His left leg had to be amputated as a result. The battalion filed two cases that day with the Rajapur police implicating Limon in an arms case and accusing him of obstructing police duties. The government finally decided to withdraw the cases against Limon on 9 July 2013, citing his need to return to a "healthy and normal life".

Rapid Action Battalion is accused of framing a Bangladeshi expatriate named Shamim Sikder on false charges of illegal drug-related crimes and forged currency and he was tortured in custody.

=== Enforced disappearances ===
Families of the victims and witnesses blamed RAB for picking up 83 people and detective branch for 38, 'law enforcers' for 55, and plainclothes men for 20 others reported between January 2007 and August 2014, according to a report by human rights organisation Ain-o-Shalish Kendro (ASK). The report also said that at least 70 leaders and activists of the opposition Bangladesh Nationalist Party and Jamaat-e-Islami fell victim to enforced disappearances while 37 others were activists of the Awami League.

On 5 February 2012 approximately at 1.00 a.m. Al Mukaddas (22), a 4th-year student of the Department of Al Fiqah, and Mohammad Waliullah (23), a Masters candidate of Dawah and Islamic Studies Department of the Islamic University, were allegedly arrested and became victims of forced disappearances by RAB-4 and DB policemen from Savar. Both were members of Bangladesh Islami Chhatra Shibir and were allegedly detained by members of RAB and Detective Branch (DB) of the Bangladesh Police on 4 February 2012. They have not been heard from since and their whereabouts are unknown. The RAB has denied detaining the two men in a statement to a Bangladeshi newspaper. However, reports from several sources and a pattern of disappearances thought to have been conducted by RAB in recent months cast doubt on RAB's denial.

== Investigations and allegations ==
Following the July Uprising and the subsequent fall of the Sheikh Hasina government, the role of the Rapid Action Battalion in human rights abuses came under intense scrutiny. The interim government, along with international bodies, initiated several investigations into the unit's past and recent activities.

=== Governmental and judicial actions ===
In late August 2024, the interim government established a five-member inquiry commission to investigate allegations of extrajudicial killings and enforced disappearances that occurred during the previous administration. As a signal of intent, the government also signed the instrument of accession to the International Convention for the Protection of All Persons from Enforced Disappearance.

The commission's investigations led to the discovery of secret detention sites operated by security forces. In July 2025, representatives from Robert F. Kennedy Human Rights visited a newly-uncovered detention and torture site located within the RAB-1 battalion headquarters in Dhaka. The site contained cramped, dark cells and interrogation rooms where, according to victim testimony, individuals were beaten, hung from ceilings, and subjected to electrocution.

=== Role in suppressing 2024 protests ===
According to a fact-finding report by the U.N. Office of the High Commissioner for Human Rights (OHCHR), Bangladeshi security forces, including RAB, engaged in extensive and indiscriminate use of lethal force to suppress the student-led protests in July and August 2024. The report concluded that these actions were taken with the approval of top political leaders and resulted in the deaths of up to 1,400 people by the time the government fell on August 5. Amnesty International corroborated these findings, documenting the repeated use of assault rifles, tear gas in enclosed spaces, and rubber bullets against protesters.

=== Calls for disbandment and reform ===
For years, human rights organisations have documented RAB's pattern of abuse. Human Rights Watch reported that security forces were responsible for over 600 enforced disappearances between 2009 and 2023, with nearly 100 people remaining missing. Although U.S. sanctions in 2021 led to a temporary drop in these abuses, they reportedly resumed thereafter.

In the wake of the 2024 uprising, the OHCHR and other international human rights groups intensified their calls for fundamental security sector reform. A key recommendation from the OHCHR report was the complete disbandment of the Rapid Action Battalion, arguing that the institution's consistent record of committing gross human rights violations with impunity made it beyond reform.

== U.S. sanctions ==
On 10 December 2021, the U.S. Department of the Treasury added RAB to its Specially Designated Nationals (SDN) list under GLOMAG. Six individuals associated with RAB – including its Director General, Chowdhury Abdullah Al-Mamun, former DG Benazir Ahmed, ADG Colonel KM Azad were also sanctioned. Entities on the list have their assets blocked and U.S. persons are generally prohibited from dealing with them. Bangladesh Foreign Minister AK Abdul Momen wrote an open letter to the US Secretariat of State Antony Blinken regarding RAB to reconsider those sanctions. On the other hand, US Congressman and Chair of the US House Foreign Affairs Committee Gregory W Meeks has strongly supported sanctions by the US Government and said that wholesale sanctions against Bangladesh were not necessary, but targeted sanctions were most useful.

== See also ==
- Counter Terrorism and Intelligence Bureau
- Armed Police Battalion
- Bangladesh Police
- Human Rights in Bangladesh
- Jatiya Rakkhi Bahini
- United States sanctions on Bangladesh
