= S. M. Emdadul Hoque =

Bangladeshi judge

The Honourable S. M. Emdadul Hoque
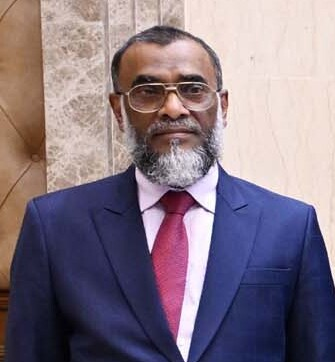
- Emdadul in 2024

Justice of the Appellate Division, Supreme Court
- Incumbent
- Assumed office 13 August 2024

Justice of the High Court Division of Bangladesh

Personal details
- Profession: Judge

S. M. Emdadul Hoque is a justice on the Appellate Division of Bangladesh Supreme Court.

== Early life ==
Emdadul Hoque was born on 7 November 1963. He completed his bachelor's degree and master's in law from the University of Rajshahi.

== Career ==
Emdadul Hoque started working as a district court lawyer on 7 October 1990. On 26 November 1992, Emdadul Hoque became a lawyer of the High Court Division of Bangladesh Supreme Court.

Emdadul Hoque was appointed an additional judge of the High Court Division of Bangladesh Supreme Court on 23 August 2004. He became a permanent judge on 23 August 2006.

Emdadul Hoque along with eighteen other judges opposed a High Court Division judgement that ordered the government to confirm the appointment of ten judges denied by the Bangladesh Nationalist Party government in July 2008.

On 27 August 2009, Emdadul Hoque and Justice A. F. M. Abdur Rahman acquitted Member of Parliament Joynal Hazari on an arms case filed in 2001.

In December 2010, Emdadul Hoque and Justice Md Ashfaqul Islam issued an order confirming that the Gulshan Club would have to pay income tax to National Board of Revenue after the club filed a petition saying it did not need to file taxes as it was a non-profit organization.

Emdadul Hoque and Justice S.M. Mozibur Rahman issued an order for the trial against seven Rapid Action Battalion officials to proceed in August 2016 for the Chittagong Shrine Robbery case.

Emdadul Hoque and Justice Bhishmadev Chakraborty on 14 December 2020 quashed the convictions against all the convicts, five sentenced to death, in the 2002 Netrokona rape case.
