= 2021 Sunamganj violence =

2021 incident of anti-Hindu violence

- Location: 24.7238°N 91.3216°E; Noagaon village, Habibpur Union, Shalla Upazila, Sunamganj, Bangladesh
- Date: March 17, 2021; Approximately 9 AM
- Target: Hindu community
- Attack type: Vandalism, looting, assault
- Weapon: Sticks
- Deaths: 0
- Injuries: Several
- Victim: Hindu residents of Noagaon village
- Perpetrators: Shahidul Islam Swadhin, Pokkon Mia, and others
- Assailant: Extremist Muslims from nearby villages
- No. of participants: Several thousand (estimated)
- Motive: Religious extremism triggered by a social media post criticizing Mamunul Haque, exacerbated by local disputes over water resources
- Inquiry: Ongoing investigation, 38 arrested as of March 20, 2021
- Accused: Shahidul Islam Swadhin and 37 others

On March 17, 2021, an attack took place on over a hundred houses of the Hindu community in Noagaon village of Habibpur Union, Shalla Upazila, Sunamganj, following allegations that a Hindu youth had made derogatory remarks on social media against Islamic scholar Mamunul Haque. Several extremist Muslims announced the attack through microphones and carried it out, during which 88 houses and 7–8 family temples were vandalized, and furniture was ransacked. The attack and vandalism were led by Shahidul Islam Swadhin, member of Ward 9 of Nachni village in Sarmangal Union, Dirai Upazila, and also president of the ward's Jubo League, along with his associate Pokkon Mia. So far, 38 people have been arrested in connection with the incident and investigation is ongoing.

== Background ==
On March 15, Mamunul Haque, joint secretary general of Hefazat-e-Islam, gave a speech at a conference organized by the group in Dirai Upazila, adjacent to Shalla. Local Hindu youth Jhumon Das criticized him on Facebook, calling him an opponent of the sculpture of Bangabandhu. Terming the post as religious provocation, people from four nearby villages staged a protest rally against Jhumon on the night of March 16. To control the situation, police ordered the people of Noagaon village to detain the youth that night.

On the morning of March 17, an announcement was made from a mosque microphone in Kashipur village calling for an attack on Noagaon village. Everyone was instructed to gather in that village. Realizing the possibility of an attack, residents of the village informed the police over the phone. Around 9 AM, several thousand people gathered with sticks on the bank of the Dirai river near Noagaon village. While the administration, police, and public representatives were trying to calm part of the angry crowd, another part stormed into the village and carried out the attack. Under attack by thousands, members of the Hindu community fled the village and went into hiding. According to the chairman of Shalla Upazila, over a hundred houses were vandalized. Wealthier homes were looted more.

As Jhumon Das's wife and the local Union Parishad chairman's wife could not escape, they were severely beaten. When the chairman's wife tried to take shelter in the bathroom, she was dragged out and beaten. At least 7 temples and the idols of prayer rooms were vandalized. According to one victim, after Jhumon was arrested, the police had assured the villagers that no untoward incident would occur. But the vandalism happened right in front of the chairman the very next day.

== Arrests and investigation ==
According to local police, a case was filed 36 hours after the attack. According to multiple residents of Noagaon village, there are two water bodies named Gosair Beel and Nityar Dair within the Shalla part of Baram Haor, adjacent to their village. These two beels were leased from the Waqf Estate and had been used for fishing for several years by Shahidul Islam, also known as Swadhin, a resident of Nachni village and member of Ward 9 of the local Sarmangal Union Parishad, along with his men. Violating the terms of the lease policy, they pumped out water using pumps and caught fish. As a result, farmers from Noagaon and surrounding villages faced irrigation problems in their Boro cultivation. In this situation, residents of Noagaon village submitted a written complaint against Shahidul Islam and his associate at Shalla Police Station. However, when the pumping still did not stop, another complaint was submitted on January 25 to the Deputy Inspector General (DIG) of Police of Sylhet Range. On the same day, Dirai Upazila administration arrested Fakhr Uddin from the Gosair water body along with two irrigation pumps. Later, he was fined five thousand taka. The two seized pumps were sold at auction for thirty-five thousand taka. Because of this, Shahidul Islam and his associates were angry with the people of Noagaon village in various ways. Police confirmed that in the case filed by the villagers, Shahidul Islam was made the number one accused. On March 20, Shahidul Islam was arrested. According to the affected villagers, most of the looters were residents of Shahidul's village.

== Reaction ==
On March 18, the Director General of RAB visited Shalla and assured that the criminals would be brought to appropriate justice. Distinguished individuals and various organizations issued a joint statement condemning the attack by religious fanatics and demanded the safety of the victims. The statement questioned how such a medieval rampage could take place using mosque microphones despite administrative surveillance. In another joint statement, ten prominent citizens expressed concern, stating that if communal forces are not resisted, it will hinder Bangladesh's progress. The then-president of the student wing of the ruling Awami League questioned why, despite leftist parties protesting such incidents, the Awami League and administration remained silent. He expressed concern over whether communal people had entered the Awami League. Representatives of the political party BNP visited the village, blamed the Awami League for the incident, and provided financial assistance to needy families. Protests and human chains were organized by the Bangladesh Puja Celebration Council and the Hindu Buddhist Christian Unity Council.
