= Khandaker Al Moin =

- Military career
- Allegiance: Bangladesh
- Branch: Bangladesh Navy
- Service years: 2000 - present
- Rank: Commander
- Conflicts: UNAMID
- Police career
- Unit: Rapid Action Battalion
- Allegiance: Bangladesh
- Branch: Bangladesh Police
- Service years: 2007 – 2024
- Rank: Director
- Awards: BPM (bar); BPM (bsa)

Khandaker Al Moin is a Bangladesh Navy commander and former Legal and Media Wing director of the Rapid Action Battalion. He had defended Rapid Action Battalion after it was sanctioned by the United States for human rights violations.

== Career ==
Moin was commissioned in the 45th batch of Bangladesh Navy.

From 2007 to 2010, Moin had served as the deputy director of the Intelligence Branch of Rapid Action Battalion headquarters. He was awarded the Bangladesh Police Medal for arresting the suspects in the 2004 Dhaka grenade attack case.

Moin had served in the United Nations–African Union Mission in Darfur.

In December 2019, Moin was sent to Rapid Action Battalion on deputation from Bangladesh Navy. He was appointed director of Communications and MIS Wing of Rapid Action Battalion. He introduced Onsite Identification and Verification System to identify suspects detained on location.

In March 2021, Moin was appointed director of the Legal and Media Wing of the Rapid Action Battalion replacing Lieutenant colonel Ashiq Billah. He had defended the human rights record of Rapid Action Battalion, which has been sanctioned by the United States for human rights violations. He said, "Very few forces in the world show humanity like RAB". In January 2022, he was awarded the Bangladesh Police Medal again.
