= A. K. M. Asaduzzaman =

Bangladeshi judge

- এ. কে. এম. আসাদুজ্জামান

Chairman of the Bangladesh Anti Corruption Commission
- Incumbent
- Assumed office 17 August 2026
- Appointed by: President of Bangladesh
- President: Hafiz Uddin Ahmad (acting); Mirza Fakhrul Islam Alamgir
- Preceded by: Mohammad Abdul Momen

Justice of the Appellate Division, Supreme Court
- In office 25 March 2025 – 1 March 2026

Justice of the High Court Division of Bangladesh
- In office 27 August 2003 – 24 March 2025

Personal details
- Born: 1 March 1959 (age 67)
- Education: University of Rajshahi
- Profession: Judge

A. K. M. Asaduzzaman is a retired judge of the Appellate Division, Supreme Court of Bangladesh. He is currently the Chairman of the Anti Corruption Commission.

== Early life ==
Asaduzzaman was born on 1 March 1959. He completed his bachelor's and master's in law from the University of Rajshahi.

== Career ==
Asaduzzaman joined the District Courts as a lawyer on 5 September 1983.

On 5 September 1985, Asaduzzaman became a lawyer of the High Court Division.

Asaduzzaman became a lawyer of the Appellate Division of the Bangladesh Supreme Court on 25 October 2001.

On 27 August 2003, Asaduzzaman was appointed an additional judge of the High Court Division.

Asaduzzaman was made a permanent judge of the High Court Division on 27 August 2005.

On 15 June 2012, Asaduzzaman and Justice Mahmudul Hoque were given the task to hear bail and appeals petitions in the High Court Division. On 31 July, Asaduzzaman and Justice Abu Taher Md Saifur Rahman scrapped a 10-year prison sentence of Giasuddin Al Mamun in a 2008 tax evasion case.

On 7 June 2016, Asaduzzaman and Justice Ataur Rahman Khan granted bail to the editor of The Daily Star, Mahfuz Anam, in 10 cases. Anam had 82 cases against him, including 65 defamation and 17 sedition cases.

On 26 November 2017, Asaduzzaman and Justice Razik-Al-Jalil granted bail to Bangladesh Nationalist Party politician Mahatab Uddin Ahmmed Chowdhury Minar in a 2014 murder case over the death of Ekramul Haq, an Awami League politician.

Asaduzzaman and Justice SM Mozibur Rahman on 23 July 2018 ordered the Comilla special judges court to quickly dispose of the case against former prime minister Khaleda Zia. Asaduzzaman and Justice SM Mozibur Rahman granted bail on 30 July 2018 to Mahmudur Rahman, editor of Amar Desh, in a defamation case regarding comments he made about the family of President Sheikh Mujibur Rahman. On 6 August 2018, Asaduzzaman and Justice SM Mozibur Rahman rejected the bail petition of former prime minister Khaleda Zia in a 2015 murder case over an arson attack on a bus in Comilla.

On 20 June 2019, Asaduzzaman and Justice SM Mozibur Rahman granted bail to Amanur Rahman Khan Rana, Awami League member of parliament from Tangail-3, in a murder case from 2012.

On 14 October 2020, Asaduzzaman and Justice Kazi Md Ejarul Haque Akondo refused to grant bail to family members of lawyer of the Bangladesh Supreme Court Asif Imtiaz Khan Jisad who had been accused of being involved in his death.

On 28 September 2021, Asaduzzaman and Justice Kazi Md Ejarul Haque Akondo extended the bail of former prime minister Khaleda Zia.

On 17 August 2026, he was named the new chairmain of the Anti Corruption Commission.
