= Bhashantek Thana =

Thana in Dhaka North City Corporation

Bhasantek
- Thana
- Interactive map of Bhasantek
- Coordinates: 23.81572°N 90.39335°E
- Country: Bangladesh
- Division: Dhaka Division
- District: Dhaka District
- Elevation: 23 m (75 ft)

Population (2022)
  - Total: 117,971
- Time zone: UTC+6 (BST)
- Postal code: 1100
- Area code: 02

Bhashantek Thana (Bengali: ভাষানটেক থানা) is a police jurisdiction of Dhaka North City Corporation under Dhaka District in Bangladesh. This police station is an integral part of the Dhaka Metropolitan Police network, contributing to the safety and security of the Bhashantek area. It has a significant and crucial role dedicating to maintain law and order in the region. It operates it activities and programs under the jurisdiction of Bangladesh Police, a department of the Ministry of Home Affairs (Bangladesh).

== Geography ==
Bhashantek Thana, along with seven other police stations, was inaugurated in April 2012. It is situated near the Police Staff Collage Playground 5 and the Lalasharai Jame Masjid. To the east, north and south, it is bounded solely by the Cantonment Thana, and to the west, is bordered by the Pallabi Thana and the Kafrul Thana.

== Demographics ==
Religions in Bhasantek Thana (2022)
Religion	Percent
Islam	98.08%
Hinduism	1.83%
Other or not stated	0.09%

According to the 2022 Bangladeshi census, Bhasantek Thana had 31,058 households and a population of 117,971. 8.33% of the population were under 5 years of age. Bhasantek had a literacy rate (age 7 and over) of 78.52%: 79.98% for males and 76.94% for females, and a sex ratio of 108.05 males for every 100 females.
