= Md. Harun Ur Rashid =

Bangladeshi retired police officer

Md. Harun Ar Rashid
- মোঃ হারুন অর রশিদ

11th Director General of Rapid Action Battalion
- In office 5 June 2024 – 6 August 2024
- Preceded by: M Khurshid Hossain
- Succeeded by: AKM Shahidur Rahman

Personal details
- Born: Munshiganj, Bangladesh
- Education: University of Dhaka; University of London
- Police career
- Allegiance: Bangladesh
- Branch: Bangladesh Police
- Service years: 1995-2024
- Rank: Additional IGP

Md. Harun Ar Rashid is a Bangladeshi retired police officer who served as director general of the Rapid Action Battalion for a brief period. He was previously the additional inspector general (HRM) of the Police Headquarters.

== Career ==
Harun Ar Rashid joined the police cadre as assistant superintendent of police in 1995.

In April 2013, Harun Ar Rashid was transferred from the Criminal Investigation Department to the 3rd Armed Police Battalion.

Harun Ar Rashid was transferred from police headquarters to Police Telecom and Information Management in November 2017.

In January 2022, Harun Ar Rashid was promoted to additional inspector general of police while serving as the head of the Mymensingh Range Police.

Barrister Harun ur Rashid was appointed as director general of the Rapid Action Battalion in May 2024 in a notification signed by Md. Mahabur Rahman Sheikh, an official of the Public Security Division. He had succeed M Khurshid Hossain in June 2024.

AKM Shahidur Rahman replaced Harun Ar Rashid as director general of the Rapid Action Battalion after the fall of the Sheikh Hasina-led Awami League government. He was transferred to police headquarters. In October 2024, he was dismissed from police service on various grounds. On 20 October, he was charged in an attempted murder case along with ZI Khan Panna, Obaidul Quader, Asaduzzman Khan, Farhad Hossain, Chowdhury Abdullah Al Mamun, Habibur Rahman, Harun or Rashid, Biplab Kumar Sarkar, Banaj Kumar Majumder, Mohammad Ashrafuzzaman Siddiqui, and 169 others.
