= Chowdhury Abdullah Al-Mamun =

Bangladeshi police officer

- চৌধুরী আব্দুল্লাহ আল মামুন
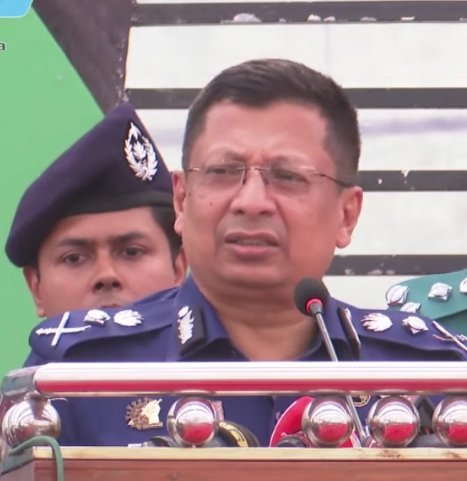
- Al-Mamun in 2022

Inspector General of Bangladesh Police
- In office 30 September 2022 – 6 August 2024
- President: Abdul Hamid; Mohammed Shahabuddin
- Prime Minister: Sheikh Hasina
- Preceded by: Benazir Ahmed
- Succeeded by: Md. Mainul Islam

9th Director General of Rapid Action Battalion
- In office 15 April 2020 – 29 September 2022
- President: Abdul Hamid
- Prime Minister: Sheikh Hasina
- Preceded by: Benazir Ahmed
- Succeeded by: M Khurshid Hossain

13th Chief Executive of Criminal Investigation Department
- In office 10 October 2019 – 14 March 2020
- Preceded by: Md Shafiqul Islam
- Succeeded by: Mahbubur Rahman

Personal details
- Born: 12 January 1964 (age 62) Shalla, Sunamganj, East Pakistan, Pakistan
- Spouse: Tayyaba Musarrat Jaha
- Police career
- Allegiance: Bangladesh
- Branch: Bangladesh Police
- Service years: 1989–2024
- Criminal information
- Criminal charges: Crimes against humanity during July Uprising, corruption, extortion
- Penalty: 5 years imprisonment
- Rank: IGP

Chowdhury Abdullah Al-Mamun (born 12 January 1964) is a Bangladeshi former police officer who served as the inspector general of Bangladesh Police (IGP) from 30 September 2022 to 6 August 2024. Prior to this, he served as the director general of the Rapid Action Battalion (RAB). Before joining RAB, he was the chief of the Criminal Investigation Department (CID).

Following the ousting of Prime Minister Sheikh Hasina, Al-Mamun was sentenced to five years in prison by the International Crimes Tribunal after pleading guilty to overseeing mass killings of protestors.

== Early life ==
Al-Mamun was born on 12 January 1964 in the village of Shreehail under Shalla Upazila in Sunamganj District.

== Career ==
Al-Mamun joined Bangladesh Police as an assistant superintendent of police in 1989. He served as Deputy Superintendent, Crime in Narayanganj District in 1991-1993, as Deputy Superintendent (Armed Police), Gazipur District in 1993-1995, and as Deputy Superintendent in CID from 1995-1997. Thereafter, served as SDPO Habiganj in 1997-1999 and SDPO Sadar, Sylhet, 1999-2000. Promoted as Additional SP in 2000, he served as Addl. SP (HQ), Comilla in 2000-2001, and thereafter in Range Reserve Forces and PTCs. He was promoted as SP in December 2006 and posted as SP, Nilphamari. From October 2007, he was appointed SP, Narail, where he served till 2009. He was promoted to DCP (Security) in DMP in the rank of AIG in 2009. Promoted to DIG, Mymensingh Range, from 2011 to 2013, as DIG, Dhaka Range, from 2013 to 2015, and as ADG in the RAB from 2015 to 2018. Thereafter, he was Addl. IGP in Special Branch from 2018 to 2020. Mamun was promoted to Additional IG grade-I in October 2021. During his service period, he served as superintendent of police in Nilphamari District, deputy commissioner in Dhaka Metropolitan Police, and as deputy inspector general in Mymensingh and Dhaka Range and Police Headquarters.

Al-Mamun was appointed IGP on 22 September 2022 and assumed his position on 30 September. He was scheduled to retire on 11 January 2023, as he would reach the age limit for governmental service. But he was appointed on a contractual basis for a period of one and a half years from 12 January 2023 to 11 July 2024. On 5 July 2024, his tenure was extended again, up to 11 July 2025. In the aftermath of the July Uprising and the overthrow of Sheikh Hasina, his contract was cancelled on 6 August 2024, and Md. Mainul Islam was appointed the new IGP.

=== U.S. sanctions ===
On 10 December 2021, the U.S. Department of the Treasury added Al-Mamun to its Specially Designated Nationals (SDN) list over the killing of Ekramul Haque under the Global Magnitsky Act. Individuals on the list have their assets blocked, and U.S. persons are generally prohibited from dealing with them.

=== Arrest and trial ===
On 3 September 2024, Al-Mamun, along with another former IGP, A. K. M. Shahidul Haque, was arrested from the Uttara area of Dhaka. They are both facing multiple cases, including murder cases. On 17 September, he was arrested in six more murder cases filed with Uttara East and West police stations.

Al-Mamun's trial began on 20 November 2024. Along with seven others, Al-Mamun was accused of crimes against humanity, genocide, and overseeing massacres during the response to the non-cooperation movement. The accused pleaded guilty and turned state witness becoming the first to act as an approver in the history of the International Crimes Tribunal. He alleged that former prime minister Sheikh Hasina had ordered the protesters be attacked with lethal weapons. The accused said he received the order from home minister Asaduzzaman Khan on July 18, 2024. As a result of his plea, he avoided the death penalty and was sentenced to five years in prison. He also apologized to the court and the country.

On 17 December 2025, Al-Mamun filed an appeal with the Appellate Division of the Supreme Court seeking his acquittal.

The ICT investigation agency said in April 2026 that it found some evidence of involvement of Mamun in extrajudicial killings during a demonstration by Hefazat-e-Islam at Shapla Square, Motijheel, on 5 May 2013.

== Personal life ==
Al-Mamun is married to Tayyaba Musarrat Jaha Chowdhury, an associate professor at Holy Family Red Crescent Medical College.
