= Pallabi Thana =

Thana in Dhaka North City Corporation, Bangladesh

Pallabi Thana পল্লবী থানা
- Thana
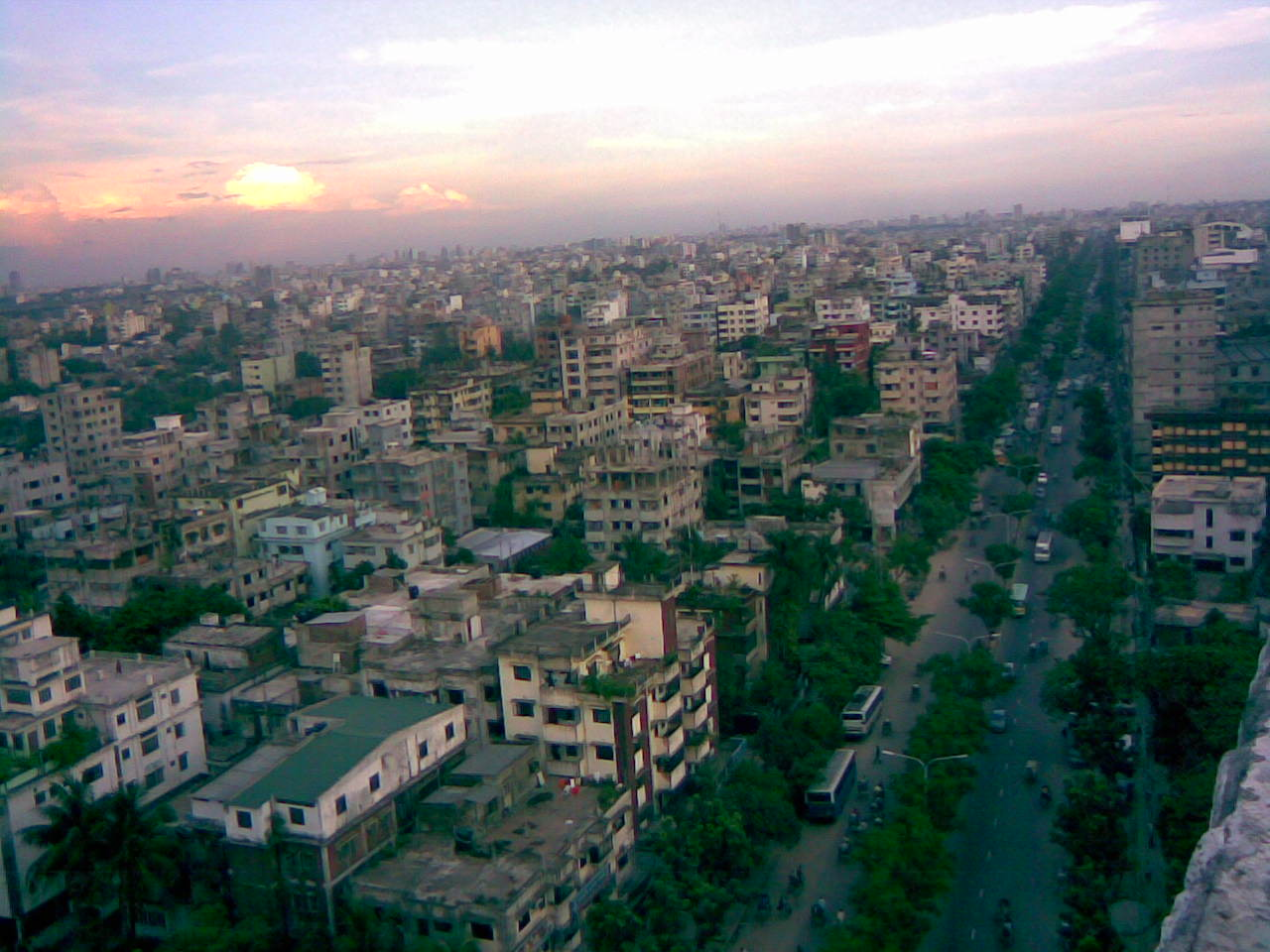
- Skyline of Pallabi, Bangladesh
- Expandable map of vicinity of Pallabi Thana
- Coordinates: 23.825°N 90.3694°E
- Country: Bangladesh
- Division: Dhaka Division
- District: Dhaka District
- Established as a thana: 2005

Area
  - Total: 9.97 km^{2} (3.85 sq mi)
- Elevation: 23 m (75 ft)

Population (2022)
  - Total: 597,574
  - Density: 23,609/km^{2} (61,150/sq mi)
- Time zone: UTC+6 (BST)
- Postal code: 1221
- Area code: 02

Pallabi (Bengali: পল্লবী) is a thana of Dhaka District in the Division of Dhaka, Bangladesh. Its total area is 9.97 square kilometres (3.85 sq mi), located between 23°48' and 23°52' north latitudes and between 90°20' and 90°23' east longitudes.

== Origin of name ==
Pallabi is the daughter of late Jahurul Islam (owner of Eastern Housing). After 1971, when Eastern housing won the tender for the Mirpur extension project, the project was named after his daughter.

== Geography ==
Pallabi is bounded by Turag River and Uttara Thana on the north, Mirpur Model Thana and Shah Ali Thana on the south, Bimanbandar Thana, Cantonment Thana and Kafrul Thana on the east, and Savar Upazila on the west. Its total area is 9.97 km².

== Demographics ==
Religions in Pallabi Thana (2022)
Religion	Percent
Islam	98.04%
Hinduism	1.70%
Other or not stated	0.26%

According to the 2022 Bangladeshi census, Pallabi Thana had 169,901 households and a population of 597,592. 7.55% of the population were under 5 years of age. Pallabi had a literacy rate (age 7 and over) of 86.06%: 87.68% for males and 84.22% for females, and a sex ratio of 112.93 males for every 100 females.

According to 2011 Census of Bangladesh, Pallabi Thana has a population of 596,835 with average household size of 4.2 members, and an average literacy rate of 70.6% vs national average of 51.8% literacy.

== Administration ==
Pallabi has one union/ward, 16+27 mauzas/mahallas, and no villages.

== Mosque ==
- Pallabi Jhil Jame Masjid
- Pallabi Baitul Aman Jame Masjid
- Baitus Salah Jame Mosque

== Educational Institutions ==
- Pallabi Mazedul Islam Model High School
- Pallabi Govt Primary School
- Averroes International School
- Pallabi Nursing College
- Apple Tree International School
- Markazud Dawah Al-islamia
- Madrasah Abdullah ibne Masud
- Shohid Zia Mohila College

== See also ==
- Upazilas of Bangladesh
- Districts of Bangladesh
- Divisions of Bangladesh
- List of districts and suburbs of Dhaka
