= Md. Mukhlesur Rahman =

Md. Mukhlesur Rahman is a Bangladesh Police officer and former director general of the Rapid Action Battalion. During his term concerns were raised about human rights violations by Rapid Action Battalion personnel. The United States used the Magnitsky Act against seven former and current officers of RAB; the first usage against Bangladesh in 2021.

== Biography ==
Rahman was born in Comilla Adarsha Sadar Upazila, Comilla District.

Rahman joined the Bangladesh Police in 1986.

In 2010, Rahman was the superintendent of police of Brahmanbaria District. He served as a director of National Security Intelligence.

Rahman was the deputy inspector general of the Rajshahi Range of Bangladesh Police since 2007. In September 2010, Rahman was appointed director general of the Rapid Action Battalion, an elite paramilitary unit. He denied allegations of extrajudicial killings by the Rapid Action Battalion after his appointment. He provided his statement to an inquiry committee of the Ministry of Public Administration into the Seven Murders of the Narayanganj. He was questioned for two hours by Shahjahan Ali Mollah, additional secretary of the Ministry of Public Administration. He rejected allegations of human rights violations by the Rapid Action Battalion.

In December 2014, Benazir Ahmed was appointed director general of the Rapid Action Battalion replacing Rahman. Rahman retired after leaving the post of director general.
