= Benazir Ahmed =

Bangladeshi police officer

Benzir Ahmed
- বেনজীর আহমেদ
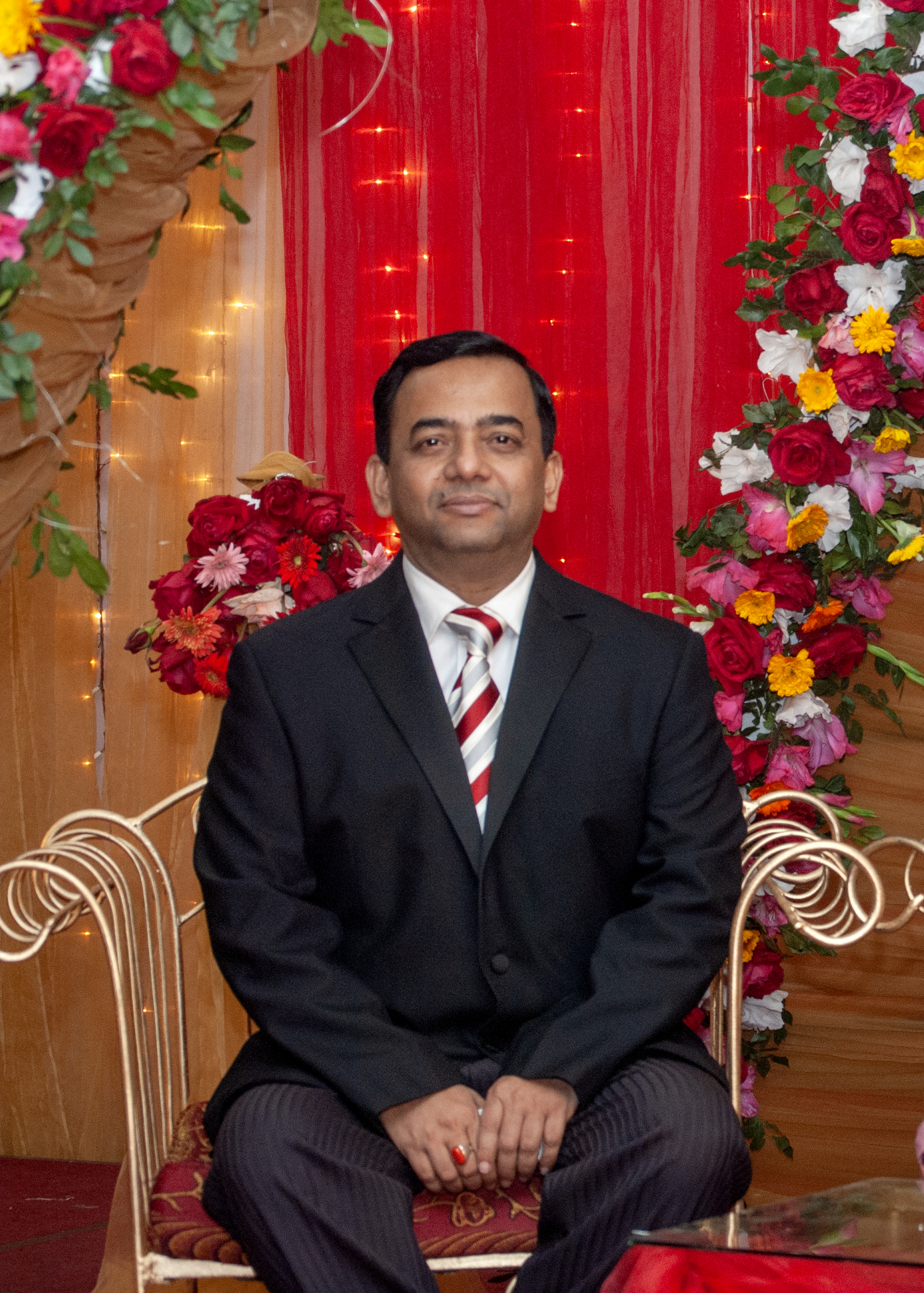
- Ahmed in 2012

Inspector General of Bangladesh Police
- In office 15 April 2020 – 30 September 2022
- President: Abdul Hamid
- Prime Minister: Sheikh Hasina
- Preceded by: Mohammad Javed Patwary
- Succeeded by: Chowdhury Abdullah Al-Mamun

8th Director General of Rapid Action Battalion
- In office 7 January 2015 – 14 April 2020
- President: Abdul Hamid
- Prime Minister: Sheikh Hasina
- Preceded by: Md. Mukhlesur Rahman
- Succeeded by: Chowdhury Abdullah Al-Mamun

18th Police Commissioner of Dhaka Metropolitan Police
- In office 14 October 2010 – 8 January 2015
- Preceded by: A. K. M. Shahidul Haque
- Succeeded by: Asaduzzaman Mia

Personal details
- Born: 1 October 1963 (age 63) Gopalganj District, East Pakistan, Pakistan
- Education: University of Dhaka (Ph.D.)
- Police career
- Allegiance: Bangladesh
- Branch: Bangladesh Police
- Status: Retired
- Rank: IGP

Benzir Ahmed (Bengali: বেনজির আহমেদ) is a retired police officer who served as the inspector general of the Bangladesh Police. Prior to his appointment as IGP, he served as the director general of the Rapid Action Battalion (RAB) from January 2015 to April 2020. He is currently on a US sanctions list due to RAB's alleged role in forcibly disappearing citizens since December 2021.

In April 2024, the Anti-Corruption Commission of Bangladesh formed a committee to investigate the wealth of Ahmed after Bangladesh Pratidin and Kaler Kantho published articles titled "Benazirer Ghore Aladiner Cherag" (Aladin's lamp at Benazir's house) and "Boner Jomite Benazirer Resort" (Benazir's resort on forest land), alleging Ahmed had amassed a vast amount of wealth illegally.

== Education ==
Benazir Ahmed was born in Gopalganj. He completed his SSC exams from SM Model High School in Gopalganj in 1978, and cleared the HSC exams from Jagannath College in 1980, both in the second division. He completed his undergrad in 1982. He completed his master's from the University of Dhaka in 1982 in English literature. He earned his Ph.D. in business administration from the University of Dhaka. Enrollment qualifications were relaxed by his PhD supervisor, Shibli Rubayat Ul Islam.

However, the University of Dhaka (Syndicate committee) has suspended Mr. Ahmed's doctorate degree based on the report by the fact-finding committee, which found that Mr. Ahmed violated the basic eligibility requirements to be admitted to the program. The suspension decision was made on 20 July 2025.

== Career ==
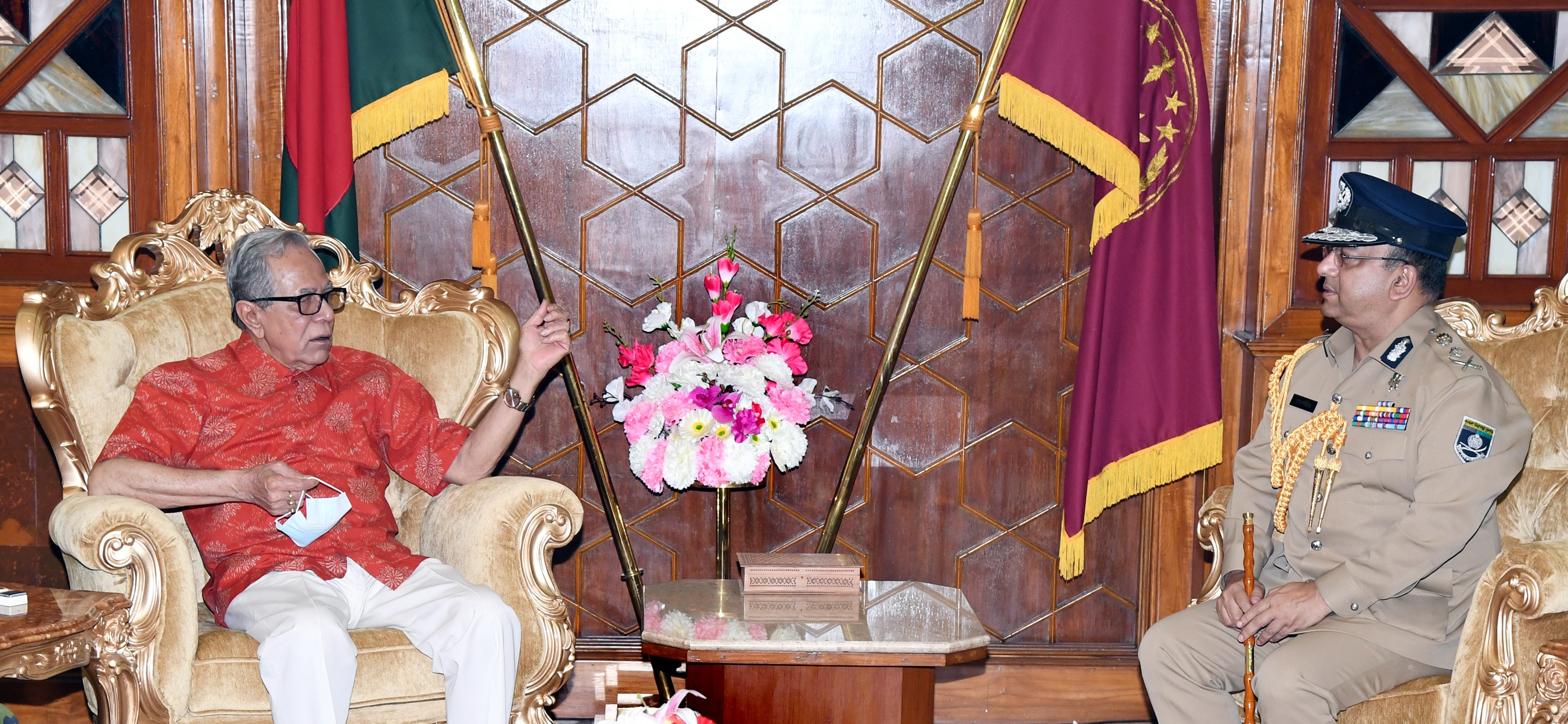
Ahmed, as the inspector general of police, meeting with Mohammad Abdul Hamid, then president of Bangladesh, in 2020.

Ahmed joined the Bangladesh Police as assistant superintendent of police in 1988. He served in various appointments concurrently with his career. He has also received professional training from home and abroad. He was the commissioner of the Dhaka Metropolitan Police. He criticized a Transparency International Bangladesh report on the Bangladesh police, which he described as criticizing the police "cruelly" and "unjustly" in 2013.

On 30 December 2014, Ahmed was appointed director general of the Rapid Action Battalion, replacing Mukhlesur Rahman.

Ahmed was made the inspector general of police in April 2020.

In 2022, the home ministry issued a notice that the IGP and two other officials were going to Germany on a 9-day visit to check the quality of 100,000 pieces of bed sheets for double cots and pillows for the police department. This news caused controversy. Later the trip was cancelled after an uproar. The Bangladesh Police claim that these reports were "untrue and misleading," and were a result of "linguistic confusion".

== US sanctions ==
On 10 December 2021, the U.S. Department of the Treasury added Ahmed to its Specially Designated Nationals (SDN) list under the Global Magnitsky Act. Individuals on the list have their assets blocked, and U.S. persons are generally prohibited from having financial dealings with them.

Ahmed denied all allegations and expressed his shock at being sanctioned. He blamed the sanctions on "propaganda" and "anti-state forces." He also accused human rights organizations of misleading US politicians, specifically referring to one unnamed group whose "South Asia director" was "a Pakistani".

An Interpol Red Notice was issued in crimes against humanity and economic corruption cases.

== Allegations of corruption ==
On 31 March 2024, two Bangladeshi newspapers, Bangladesh Pratidin and Kaler Kantho, published an investigative article on alleged corruption by Ahmed. According to the article, Ahmed built a resort, Savannah Eco Resort, in Bairagitol village of Gopalganj District, Bangladesh, by illegally seizing lands from Hindu families. On 23 May, the court ordered to freeze his properties and bank accounts over corruption charges. On 3 June, he left the country. Transparency International Bangladesh (TIB) raised alarms over massive corruption allegations against him. The Anti-Corruption Commission says proof of corruption was found against Ahmed, and a case would be filed. On 12 June, the court ordered confiscation of more properties of Ahmed and his family.

== Personal life ==
Ahmed is married to Zeeshan Mirza. Together they have three daughters: Farheen Rishta Binte Benazir, Tahseen Raisa Binte Benazir and Zahra Zareen Binte Benazir.
