= M Khurshid Hossain =

Bangladeshi police officer

- এম খুরশীদ হোসেন
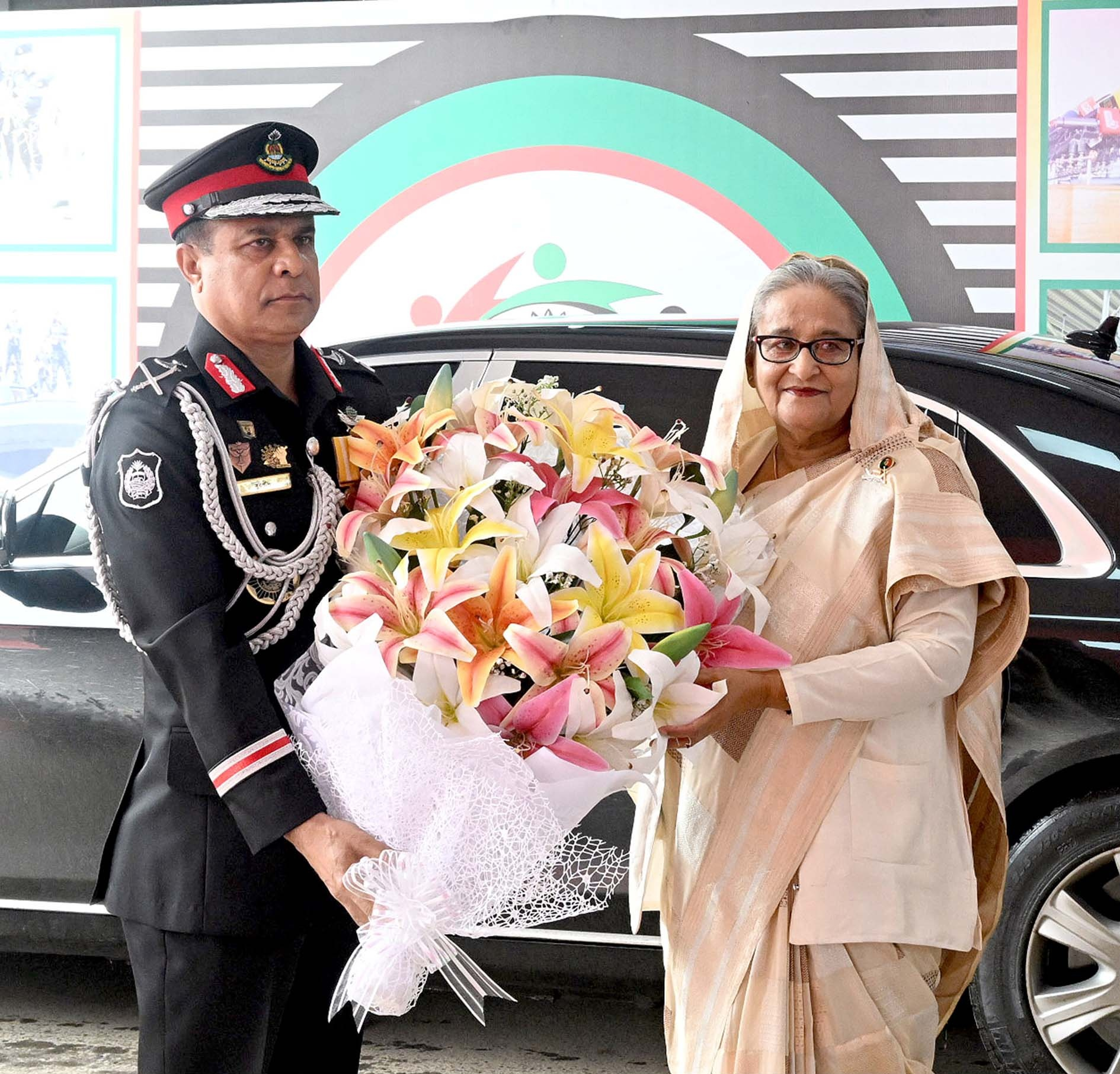
- Hossain with Hasina in 2023

10th Director General of Rapid Action Battalion
- In office 30 September 2022 – 5 June 2024
- President: Abdul Hamid; Mohammed Shahabuddin
- Prime Minister: Sheikh Hasina
- Preceded by: Chowdhury Abdullah Al-Mamun
- Succeeded by: Md. Harun Ur Rashid

Personal details
- Born: June 5, 1964 (age 62) Kashiani Upazila, Gopalganj, Bangladesh
- Education: Police Training Bangladesh Police Academy
- Awards: Bangladesh Police Medal (Bravery) – BPM; President Police Medal (Bravery) – PPM
- Police career
- Allegiance: Bangladesh
- Branch: Bangladesh Police
- Service years: 1991–2024
- Status: Retired
- Rank: Addl. IGP

M Khurshid Hossain is a Bangladeshi retired police officer and former director general of the Rapid Action Battalion. He is the former additional inspector general (crime and operations) of Police Headquarters. Prior to that, he was DIG of Police Headquarters.

== Early life ==
Hossain was born on 5 June 1964 in Kashiani Upazila, Gopalganj District.

== Career ==
Hossain joined the 12th BCS police cadre as assistant superintendent of police. Hossain was the additional superintendent of police in Pabna District in 2001. During the 2001 to 2006 Bangladesh Nationalist Party government, Hossain was denied promotions and better positions along with other officers from Gopalganj District, Faridpur District, and religious minorities. He served as the superintendent of police of Chuadanga District and Pabna District.

Hossain served as superintendent of police of Madaripur District.

He served as deputy inspector general of police in Rajshahi Range. Then, deputy inspector general of police (operation) at police headquarters. He was promoted to the post of additional inspector general of police in May 2021.

Hossain was appointed director general of the Rapid Action Battalion in September 2022. In May 2023, his service was extended by one year. He would retire on 4 June 2024.
