= Md. Ahsan Habib Palash =

Bangladeshi police officer

- মো. আহসান হাবীব পলাশ

1st Director General of Special Response Battalion
- In office 15 September 2026 – 3 November
- President: Mirza Fakhrul Islam Alamgir
- Prime Minister: Tarique Rahman
- Preceded by: office established
- Succeeded by: Faruk Ahmed

13th Director General of Rapid Action Battalion
- In office 16 March 2026 – 15 September 2026
- President: Mohammed Shahabuddin; Hafiz Uddin Ahmad (acting); Mirza Fakhrul Islam Alamgir
- Prime Minister: Tarique Rahman
- Preceded by: AKM Shahidur Rahman
- Succeeded by: Office abolished

Personal details
- Education: Bangladesh Police Academy
- Awards: Bangladesh Police Medal (BPM-Seba)
- Police career
- Allegiance: Bangladesh
- Branch: Bangladesh Police
- Service years: 1995–present
- Status: Active
- Rank: Addl. IGP

Md. Ahsan Habib Palash (Bengali: মো. আহসান হাবীব পলাশ) is a Grade-1 senior Bangladeshi police officer and Former director general of the Rapid Action Battalion. and 1st Director General of Special Response Battalion from September to November 2026.

== Career ==
Palash joined the 15th Bangladesh Civil Service (Police). He served as the deputy inspector general (DIG) of the Chattogram Range.

On 16 March 2026, the government of Bangladesh, through a gazette notification from the Ministry of Home Affairs, appointed Palash as director general of the Rapid Action Battalion. He succeeded A K M Shahidur Rahman. The appointment took immediate effect and was part of a broader reshuffle in top police leadership following the national elections. He was elevated to the additional IGP rank. Other simultaneous changes included new chiefs for the Special Branch and Criminal Investigation Department.

== See also ==
- Rapid Action Battalion
- Bangladesh Police
