= Shalla Upazila =

Shalla শাল্লা
- Upazila
- Shalla Upazila
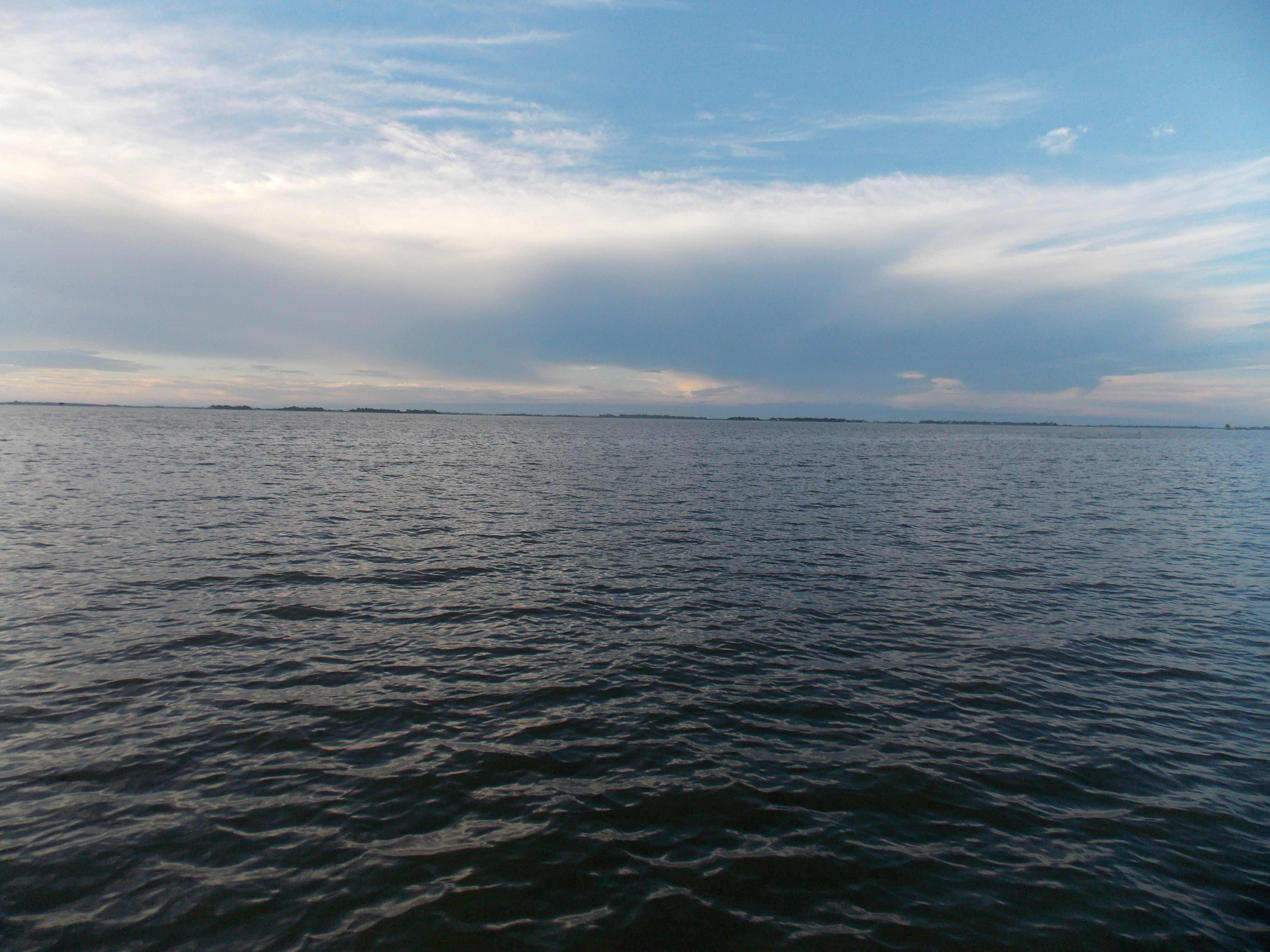
- Haor in Shalla upazila

- Country: Bangladesh
- Division: Sylhet
- District: Sunamganj
- 1919: Naval outpost
- 1941: Thana
- 1983: Upazila

Government
  - Upazila Chairman: Vacant (ad interim)

Area
  - Total: 256.03 km^{2} (98.85 sq mi)

Population (2022)
  - Total: 117,630
  - Density: 459.44/km^{2} (1,189.9/sq mi)
- Demonym(s): Sullawi, Shallawi
- Time zone: UTC+6 (BST)
- Postal code: 3050

Shalla (Bengali: শাল্লা) also spelt Sullah, is an upazila (sub-district) of the Sunamganj District, located in Bangladesh's Sylhet Division. Its headquarters is located in Ghungiargaon.

== History ==
It is generally thought that the area presently comprising Sullah Upazila was formerly inhabited by the Khasi people, which can be understood from the Khalisha Hati, Bara Hati, Kakura Hati and Godir Bak of Chobbisha village. The two mounds discovered in the village of Khalli and other mounds also provides evidence for thousand-year old tribal settlement. Among the 120 mosques in Sullah, the Ghungiargaon-Sullah Jame Mosque, Srihail Saheb Bari Jame Mosque and Bahara Jame Mosque are of historical importance.

Sullah Upazila is named after the village of Sullah which sits on the bank of the Kalni River. A small bazaar was established in the village and named Shahaganj Bazar, after Shah Nur, who was a prominent wali who lived in the village. However, the name of Shah Ullah was more prominent, and this later became corrupted to Sullah (pronounced Shalla).

In 1919, a naval police headquarters was established in Sullah village. It was converted into an administrative thana in 1941. However, as a result of the breakage in the strong current of the Kalni river, the infrastructure of the thana was destroyed. The local chiefs then re-established the headquarters in the village of Ghungiargaon, located in the centre of Sullah Thana. During the Bangladesh Liberation War of 1971, Sullah was a part of Sector 5 under Mir Shawkat Ali. Sullah was liberated on 7 December. Sullah Thana was upgraded to upazila (sub-district) in 1983 as part of the President of Bangladesh Hussain Muhammad Ershad's decentralisation programme. In 1987, the Hashimia Islami Madrasa was founded in Sullah which contributed to the educational development.

== Geography ==
Sullah is located at 24.6264°N 91.2500°E. It has a total area 256.03 km^{2}.

== Demographics ==
According to the 2022 Bangladeshi census, Shalla Upazila had 23,010 households and a population of 117,630. 11.69% of the population were under 5 years of age. Shalla had a literacy rate (age 7 and over) of 63.82%: 65.48% for males and 62.15% for females, and a sex ratio of 101.17 males for every 100 females. 9,761 (8.30%) lived in urban areas.

According to the 2011 Census of Bangladesh, Sulla Upazila had 20,299 households and a population of 113,743. 33,217 (29.20%) were under 10 years of age. Sulla had a literacy rate (age 7 and over) of 34.29%, compared to the national average of 51.8%, and a sex ratio of 984 females per 1000 males. 3,914 (3.44%) lived in urban areas. Sulla formerly had a Hindu majority, like many other upazilas in the Haor region, but after Partition the Hindus have gradually migrated to India.

As of the 1991 Bangladesh census, Sullah has a population of 89941. Males constitute 51.08% of the population, and females 48.92%. This Upazila's eighteen up population is 43247. Sullah has an average literacy rate of 21.8% (7+ years), and the national average of 32.4% literate.

=== Religion ===
Religions in Sulla Upazila (2022)
Religion	Percent
Islam	55.78%
Hinduism	44.19%
Other or not stated	0.03%

Population by religion in Union
Upazila	Muslim	Hindu	Others
Atgaon Union	27,420	6,469	5
Bahara Union	7,014	20,902	6
Habibpur Union	10,344	19,600	24
Shalla Union	20,830	5,012	1

🟩 Muslim majority 🟧 Hindu majority

== Administration ==
Sullah Upazila is divided into four union parishads: Atgaon, Bahara, Habibpur, and Shalla. The union parishads are subdivided into 65 mauzas and 116 villages.

=== List of chairmen ===
List of chairmen
Number	Name	Term
01	Kalai Mia Chowdhury	
02	Muhammad Abdul Mannan Chowdhury	1990 - 1991
03	Adv. Abani Mohan Das	22/2/2009 - 23/4/2014
04	Ganesh Chandra Sarkar	24/5/2014 - 13/5/2019
05	Chowdhury Abdullah Al-Mahmud	14/5/2019 - Present

== Notable people ==
- Akshay Kumar Das, member of the first Constituent Assembly of Pakistan
- Chowdhury Abdullah Al-Mamun, 31st Inspector General of Bangladesh Police

== See also ==
- Upazilas of Bangladesh
- Districts of Bangladesh
- Divisions of Bangladesh
