= S. M. Mozibur Rahman =

Bangladeshi judge

The Honourable S.M. Mozibur Rahman
- এস এম মুজিবুর রহমান

Justice of the High Court Division of Bangladesh
- Incumbent
- Assumed office 12 February 2015

Personal details
- Born: 12 July 1955 (age 70)
- Profession: Judge

S.M. Mozibur Rahman (born 12 June 1955) is a Bangladeshi justice of the High Court Division. He was appointed in 2015.

== Early life ==
Mozibur Rahman was born on 12 July 1966. He completed a bachelor's of arts and another bachelor's of law.

== Career ==
Mozibur Rahman joined as a district munsif on 22 February 1984.

On 9 May 2007, Mozibur Rahman was promoted to district judge.

On 12 February 2015, Mozibur Rahman was made an additional judge of the High Court Division of Bangladesh Supreme Court.

In January 2017, Mozibur Rahman and Justice Zinat Ara granted anticipatory bail to Afsan Chowdhury, professor of BRAC University, in case filed Masud Uddin Chowdhury. over a Facebook post. Mozibur Rahman became a permanent judge of the High Court Division of Bangladesh Supreme Court on 12 February 2017.

In November 2018, Mozibur Rahman and Justice A. K. M. Asaduzzaman granted bail to former prime minister Khaleda Zia in an arson case filed in Comilla in January 2015.

Mozibur Rahman and Justice A. K. M. Asaduzzaman granted bail to the editor of Amar Desh, Mahmudur Rahman, in a case over making derogatory remarks about Prime Minister Sheikh Hasina and Sheikh Mujibur Rahman.

Mozibur Rahman and Justice A. K. M. Asaduzzaman granted bail to former Awami League member of parliament Amanur Rahman Khan Rana on 14 March 2019 in the 2013 Faruk Ahmed murder case.

On 8 March 2020, Mozibur Rahman and Justice A. K. M. Asaduzzaman cancelled the bail to G.K. Shamim, a well known contractor.

In January 2022, Mozibur Rahman and Justice Md. Habibul Gani refused to grant bail to sister of journalist Kanak Sarwar in a Digital Security Act case.
