= AKM Shahidur Rahman =

12th Director General of RAB

AKM Shahidur Rahman BPM
- এ কে এম শহিদুর রহমান
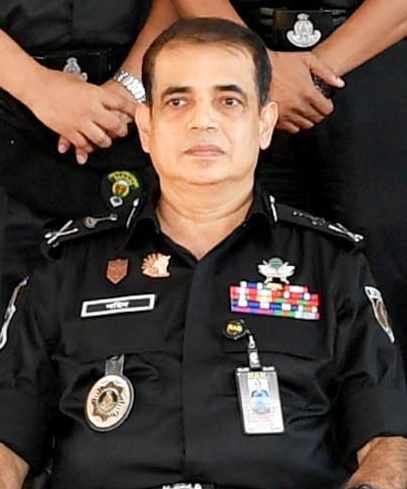
- Rahman in 2024

12th Director General of Rapid Action Battalion
- In office 7 August 2024 – 15 March 2026
- President: Mohammed Shahabuddin
- Prime Minister: Muhammad Yunus (as Chief Advise); Tarique Rahman
- Preceded by: Md. Harun Ur Rashid
- Succeeded by: Md. Ahsan Habib Palash

Personal details
- Born: Barisal, Bangladesh
- Education: Military Training Bangladesh Military Academy Police Training Bangladesh Police Academy
- Awards: Bangladesh Police Medal (Bravery)
- Police career
- Allegiance: Bangladesh
- Branch: Bangladesh Police
- Service years: 1991 – 2026
- Status: Retired
- Rank: Additional IGP

AKM Shahidur Rahman is a retired Bangladeshi police officer and former director general of Rapid Action Battalion.

== Early life ==
Rahman was born in Barisal District. He did his bachelor's degree in social studies at the University of Dhaka. He completed his master's at the Bangladesh University of Professionals.

== Career ==
Rahman joined Bangladesh Police from the 12th batch of the Bangladesh Civil Service in 1991. He completed the basic military training course at the Bangladesh Military Academy and police training at the Bangladesh Police Academy. He completed the national defence course at the National Defence College, Bangladesh.

Rahman had served as the superintendent of police of Noakhali District and Shariatpur District.

In August 2008, Rahman was appointed deputy police commissioner of the Chittagong Metropolitan Police. He had been serving as the superintendent of police of Bagerhat District. He was the additional police commissioner of the Chittagong Metropolitan Police in 2015.

Rahman was part of an anti-terrorism operation in which Bangladesh Police detained about 12 thousand people, many of whom, according to Rahman, were Islamic militants, in June 2016. The Bangladesh Nationalist Party said more than 2,100 of its members were detained as well.

Rahman was promoted to additional inspector general of police in February 2024 while serving in Police Telecom.

Following the fall of the Sheikh Hasina-led Awami League government, Rahman was appointed director general of the Rapid Action Battalion, replacing Barrister Md. Harun Ur Rashid on 7 August 2025. He was previously named the coordinator of Bangladesh Police. There were major changes in the police after the government changeover.
