= Onsite Identification and Verification System =

On-field technology used by Bangladesh's elite security force

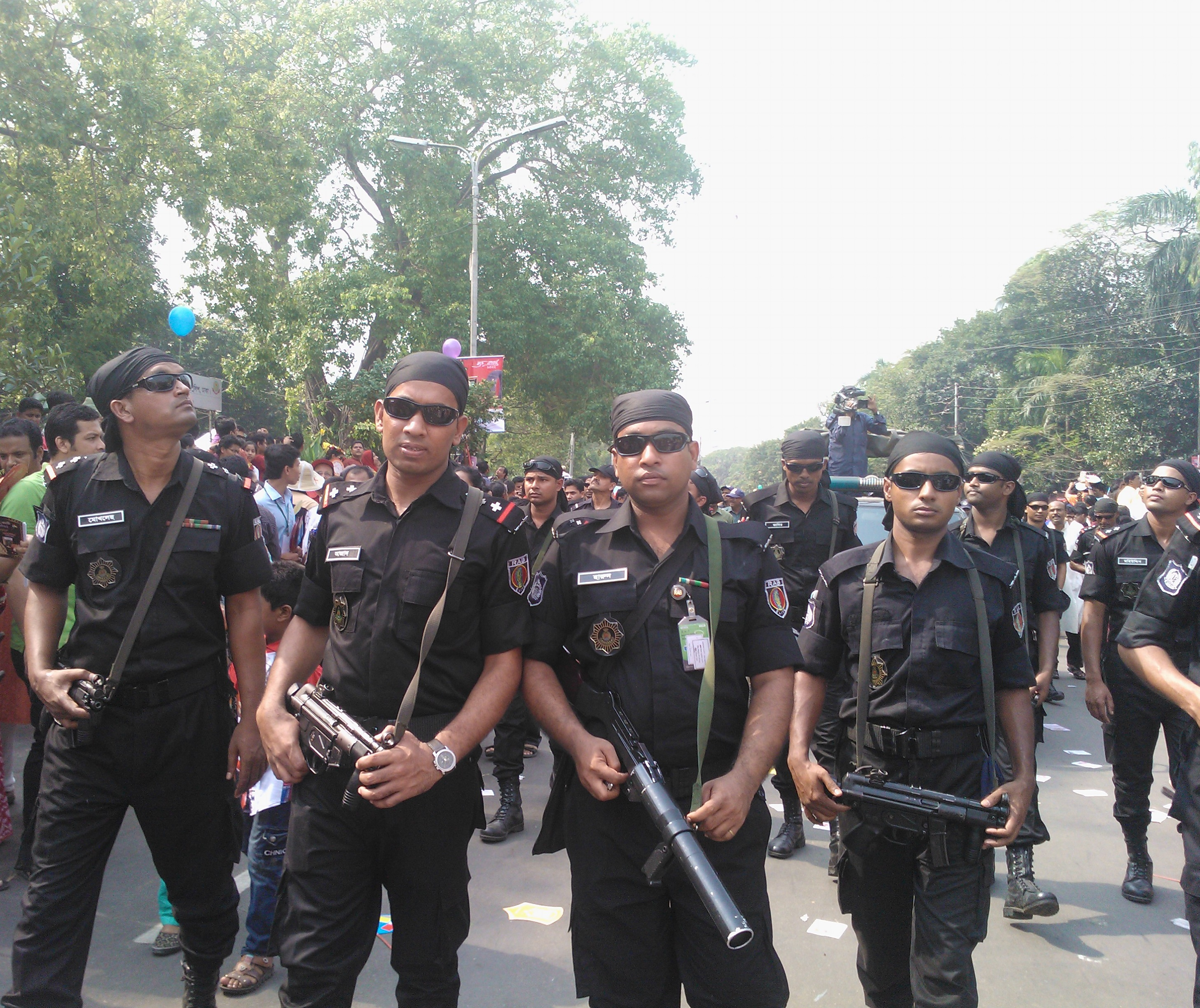
Rapid Action Battalion

The Onsite Identification and Verification System (OIVS) is a mobile technology device used by Bangladesh's elite security force, the Rapid Action Battalion (RAB), to instantly identify and verify information about suspects and criminals on field.

== Background ==
Prior to OIVS, when RAB arrested suspects, officers had to transport them to the nearest RAB office to manually look up their fingerprints, national IDs, and other information in databases to identify them.

== Technology ==
OIVS consists of a portable, smartphone-like device that can be operated anywhere through an internet connection. By inputting a suspect's fingerprint, national ID number, or date of birth into the OIVS device, officers can instantly pull up identification information and criminal history from connected government databases.

The system currently connects to Bangladesh's National ID, passport, criminal records, and prison records databases. More databases such as driving licenses may be integrated in the future.

The software for the device was made in Bangladesh, and the hardware were imported from abroad.

=== Future development ===
Planned OIVS upgrades include:

- Expanding database connectivity to driving licenses, immigration, and police databases
- Enabling photo-matching capabilities along with biometrics
- Improving security features on the devices

== Usage ==
OIVS aids RAB in:

- Identifying arrested suspects and criminals in the field, even those using disguises or fake IDs
- Accessing prior criminal records and arrests for questioning and investigations
- Adding biometric and biographical data on new suspects into the system
- Identifying bodies of deceased individuals
- Reuniting mentally disabled people separated from families.

As of early 2024, over 15 RAB battalions across Bangladesh have received OIVS devices and officer training. Company commanders currently operate the devices with strict security protocols.

The device has been used in the 2024 national election.

== Impact ==
The technology has been credited with identifying wanted murder suspects, members of terrorist organizations, as well as unknown deceased bodies and mentally disabled people to return them to families faster.
