= Chittagong Shrine Robbery =

2011 robbery by a paramilitary unit of Bangladesh

Coordinates: 22.2461°N 91.9601°E

Chittagong Shrine Robbery refers to a robbery of an Islamic shrine in Chittagong by officers of the Rapid Action Battalion, a paramilitary unit of Bangladesh, in 2011.

== History ==
On 4 November 2011, Colonel Zulfiqar Ali Majumder led members of his unit, Rapid Action Battalion-7, to Talsara Darbar Sharif and robbed the compound keeping the pir at gunpoint. They stole 27 million BDT from the shrine. Four months later, a driver of the shrine sued 10 members of Rapid Action Battalion and two informants for the robbery. Rapid Action Battalion, a composite force, returned the 10 personnel to their respective military units after an international probe found them involved in the robbery. Colonel Zulfiqar Ali Majumder was posted to Army Training and Doctrine Command.

In April 2012, Squadron Leader Mamun Ur Rashid, who was tasked with investigating the robbery and Flight Lieutenant Mahmudul Hasan as part of an investigation by Bangladesh Air Force was found dead in Silver Inn in Chittagong.

Bangladesh Police arrested Zulfiqar Ali Majumder on 4 May 2012 for his involvement in the shrine robbery and after he was sacked from Bangladesh Army after an army investigation found him guilty. He and six others were sued in the shrine robbery case. Flight Lt Sheikh Mahmudul Hasan, an accused in the case, moved a petition in front of the Bangladesh High Court to squash the case but was denied by the High Court Division in 2016. The trial in the robbery case began in September 2017.
