= Appellate Division, Supreme Court of Bangladesh =

Upper Division of the Supreme Court of Bangladesh

Appellate Division of the Supreme Court of Bangladesh
- বাংলাদেশ সুপ্রীম কোর্টের আপীল বিভাগ
- Supreme Court of Bangladesh Logo
- Interactive map of Appellate Division of the Supreme Court of Bangladesh
- 23.730777°N 90.402458°E
- Location: Ramna, Dhaka 1000, Bangladesh
- Coordinates: 23.730777°N 90.402458°E
- Authorised by: Constitution of Bangladesh
- Website: www.supremecourt.gov.bd

Chief Justice of Bangladesh
- Currently: Zubayer Rahman Chowdhury
- Since: 28 December 2025

The Appellate Division, Supreme Court of Bangladesh is the highest appellate court in the country. It serves as the final court of appeal for all civil and criminal cases, with appellate review authority over judgements of the High Court Division.

The Court is currently composed of 6 judges, led by Chief Justice Zubayer Rahman Chowdhury.

== History ==
The earliest predecessor of the Appellate Division was the Supreme Court of Pakistan, which, following the adoption of the 1956 constitution, became the highest Court for all cases, replacing the Federal Court of Pakistan. In Bangladesh, the High Court of Bangladesh Order, 1972, (President's Order No. 5 of 1972) which provisionally established the High Court as the highest court, was amended by the High Court of Bangladesh (Amendment) Order, 1972 (President's Order No. 91 of 1972) to establish the Appellate Division, conferring upon it all the powers previously vested in the Supreme Court of Pakistan. Following the adoption of the Constitution of Bangladesh, the Supreme Court of Bangladesh was established, comprising two divisions: the High Court Division and the Appellate Division.

== Jurisdiction ==
=== Appellate Jurisdiction ===
As the final court of appeal in the country, the Appellate Division primarily hears appeals against decisions of the High Court Division and other courts and tribunals. According to Article 103 of the Constitution:

1. The Appellate Division shall have jurisdiction to hear and dispose of appeals against judgments, decrees, orders or sentences of the High Court Division.
2. The judgment, decree, order or sentence of the High Court Division may be appealed by right to the Appellate Division, [...]
3. In a case against a judgment, decree, order or sentence of the High Court Division to which clause (2) of this article does not apply, the appeal shall proceed only if the Appellate Division allows the appeal.
4. Parliament may by law declare that the provisions of this article shall apply to any other court or tribunal as they apply to the High Court Division.

=== Issue and execution of appellate processes ===
According to article 104 of the Constitution:

- The Appellate Division may issue such instructions, orders, decrees or writs as may be necessary for complete justice in any case or matter pending before the Appellate Division, including an order for the attendance of any person or the discovery or submission of any documents.

=== Power of Review ===
According to article 105 of the Constitution:

- Subject to the provisions of any Act of Parliament and to any rules made by the Appellate Division, the Appellate Division shall have power to review any judgment pronounced or order passed by the Appellate Division.

=== Advisory Jurisdiction ===
According to article 106 of the Constitution:

- If at any time it appears to the President that any question of law has arisen or is likely to arise, which is of such a nature and of such public importance as to require the opinion of the Supreme Court, he shall refer the question to the Appellate Division for consideration. and the said department may, after appropriate hearing in its discretion, communicate its opinion on the question to the President.

=== Rule making power ===
According to article 107 of the Constitution:

1. Subject to any law made by the Parliament, the Supreme Court may, with the approval of the President, make rules to regulate the customs and procedures of every department and any subordinate court.
2. The Supreme Court may delegate the duties under Clause (1) of this Article and Articles 113 and 116 of this Constitution to any division of the said Court or to one or more Judges.
3. Subject to the rules made under this section, the Chief Justice shall determine the Bench of which Division shall be constituted and which Judge shall sit for what purpose.
4. The Chief Justice may depute the most senior Judge in any Division of the Supreme Court to exercise any power conferred on that Division by clause (3) of this section or by rules made under this section.

== Justices of the Appellate Division ==
Name	Date appointed in Appellate Division	Date appointed in High Court Division as additional judge	Mandatory retirement	Appointing President at High Court Division	Prime minister at time of appointment in High Court Division	Judicial position before appointment as a justice	Law school
Chief Justice Zubayer Rahman Chowdhury	13 August 2024	27 August 2003	17 May 2028	Iajuddin Ahmed	Khaleda Zia (BNP)	Advocate at Supreme Court	Dhaka University
Justice S. M. Emdadul Hoque	13 August 2024	27 August 2003	6 November 2030	Iajuddin Ahmed	Khaleda Zia (BNP)	Advocate at Supreme Court	Dhaka University
Justice Md. Rezaul Haque	13 August 2024	23 August 2004	23 April 2027	Iajuddin Ahmed	Khaleda Zia (BNP)	Advocate at Supreme Court	Dhaka University
Madame Justice Farah Mahbub	25 March 2025	23 August 2004	26 May 2033	Iajuddin Ahmed	Khaleda Zia (BNP)	Advocate at Supreme Court	Dhaka University
Justice Md. Habibul Gani	27 August 2026	18 April 2010	31 May 2029	Zillur Rahman	Sheikh Hasina (AL)	Advocate at Supreme Court	Chittagong University
