= Kotwali Thana, Rangpur =

Kotwali Thana কোতোয়ালী থানা
- Police station
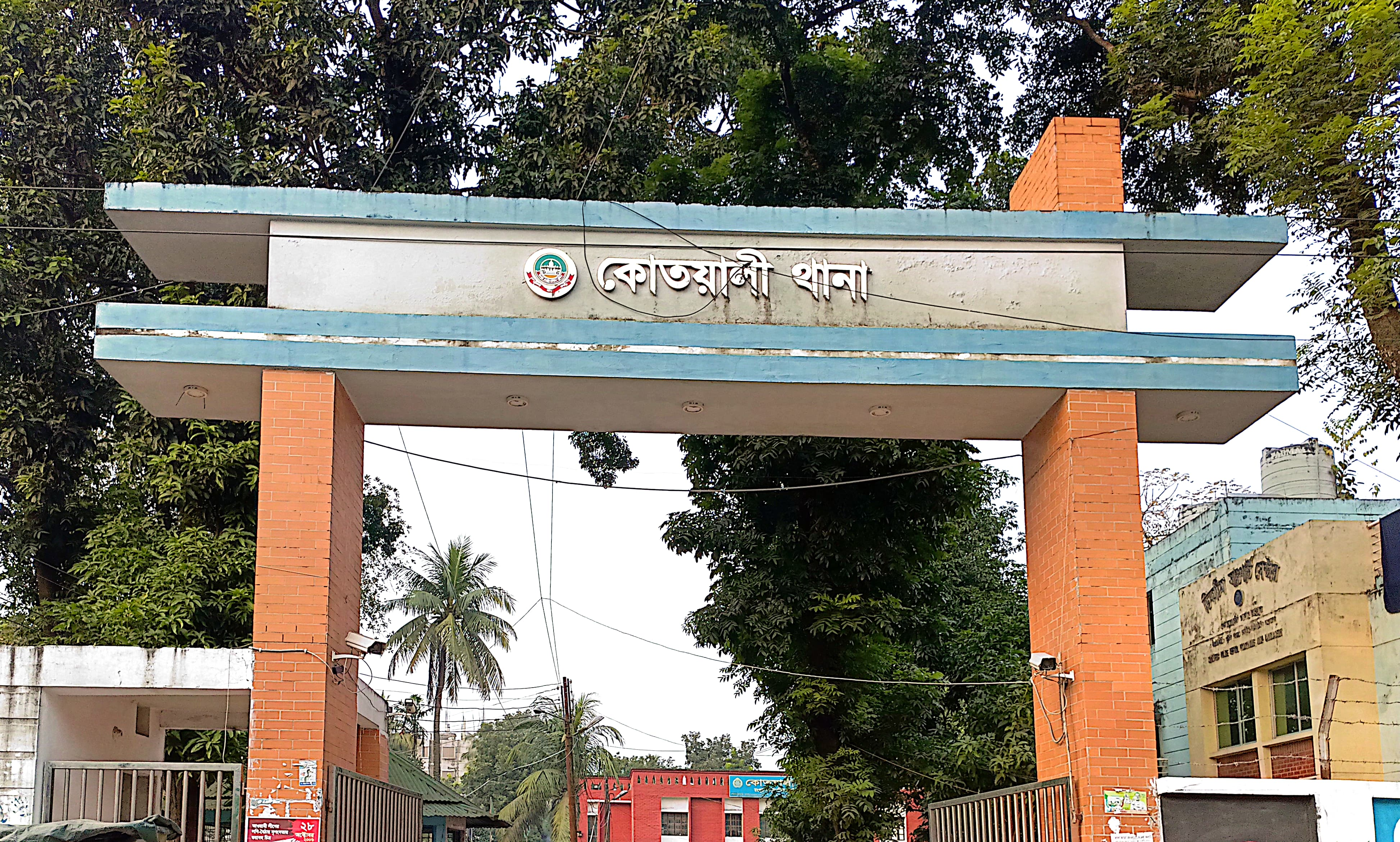

- Location in Bangladesh Kotwali Thana (Rangpur division)
- Coordinates: 25.7474777°N 89.247805°E
- Country: Bangladesh
- Division: Rangpur Division
- District: Rangpur District
- Established: 1877

Population (2022)
  - Total: 348,129
- Time zone: UTC+6 (BST)
- Postal code: 5400
- Area code: 0521
- Website: bangladesh.gov.bd/maps/images/rangpur/kotwali.gif

Kotwali Thana is a metropolitan police station of Rangpur Metropolitan Police that was established in 1877.

== Demographics ==
Religions in Kotwali Thana (2022)
Religion	Percent
Islam	93.68%
Hinduism	6.23%
Other or not stated	0.09%

According to the 2022 Bangladeshi census, Kotwali Thana had 84,003 households and a population of 348,129. 7.45% of the population were under 5 years of age. Kotwali had a literacy rate (age 7 and over) of 87.06%: 89.05% for males and 84.97% for females, and a sex ratio of 104.65 males for every 100 females.

== Administration ==
Rangpur City Corporation ward 13-28 and some unions from Rangpur Sadar Upazila and Badarganj Upazila fall under this thana.

== See also ==
- Rangpur Metropolitan Police
- Metropolitan Police (Bangladesh)
