= Sirajdikhan Upazila =

Sirajdikhan সিরাজদিখান
- Upazila
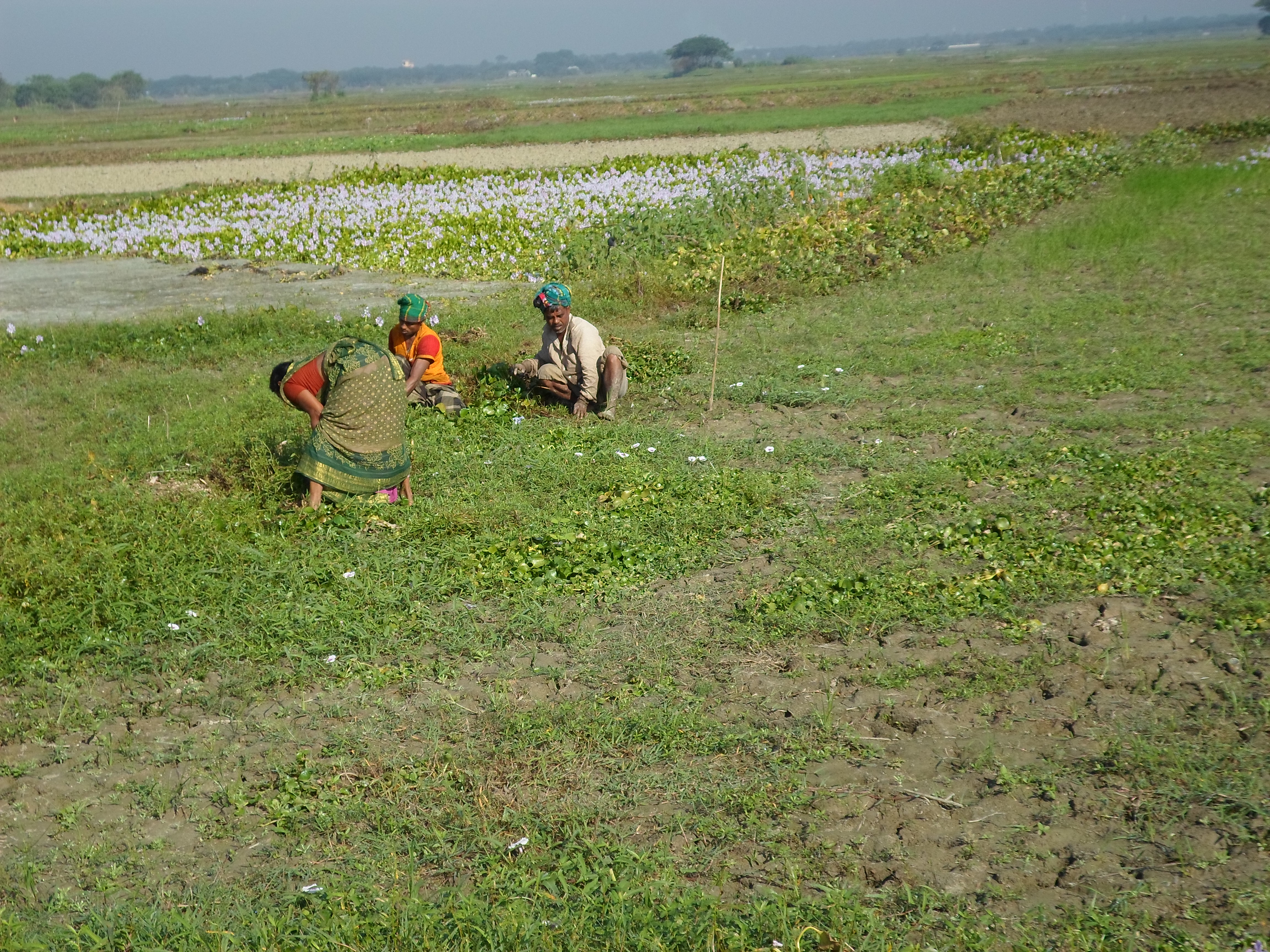
- Crop fields in Sirajdikhan upazila

- Coordinates: 23°34′15″N 90°23′00″E
- Country: Bangladesh
- Division: Dhaka
- District: Munshiganj

Area
  - Total: 180.19 km^{2} (69.57 sq mi)

Population (2022)
  - Total: 316,473
  - Density: 1,756.3/km^{2} (4,548.9/sq mi)
- Time zone: UTC+6 (BST)
- Postal code: 1540
- Area code: 06924
- Website: sirajdikhan.munshiganj.gov.bd

Sirajdikhan (Bengali: সিরাজদিখান) is an upazila of Munshiganj District in the Division of Dhaka, Bangladesh. Villages in Sirajdikhan include Gopal Pur. Its total area is 180.19 km^{2}. A large quantity of vegetables for the capital Dhaka is supplied by this upazila. This upazila is also famous for patkhir all over the country.

== Demographics ==
Religions in Sirajdikhan Upazila (2022)
| Religion | Percent |
| Islam | 87.0% |
| Hinduism | 12.5% |
| Christianity | 0.48% |
| Others or not stated | 0.02% |

According to the 2022 Bangladeshi census, Sirajdikhan Upazila had 77,999 households and a population of 316,473. 8.90% of the population were under 5 years of age. Sirajdikhan had a literacy rate (age 7 and over) of 77.38%: 78.57% for males and 76.30% for females, and a sex ratio of 92.18 males for every 100 females. 37,562 (11.87%) lived in urban areas.

According to the 2011 Census of Bangladesh, Serajdikhan Upazila had 34,760 households and a population of 288,107. 63,049 (21.88%) were under 10 years of age. Serajdikhan had a literacy rate (age 7 and over) of 64.90%, compared to the national average of 51.8%, and a sex ratio of 1007 females per 1000 males. 3,829 (1.33%) lived in urban areas.

At the 1991 Bangladesh census, Sirajdikhan had a population of 229,085. Males constituted 51.02% of the population, and females 48.98%. The population aged 18 or over was 108,535. Sirajdikhan has an average literacy rate of 33.9% (7+ years), compared to the national average of 32.4%.

== Administration ==
Sirajdikhan Upazila is divided into 14 union parishads: Bairagadi, Baluchar, Basail, Chitracoat, Ichhapura, Joyinshar, Keyain, Kola, Latabdi, Madhypara, Malkhanagar, Rajanagar, Rasunia, and Sekhornagar. The union parishads are subdivided into 124 mauzas and 178 villages.

== See also ==
- Upazilas of Bangladesh
- Districts of Bangladesh
- Divisions of Bangladesh
