= Kalabagan =

Thana in Dhaka South City Corporation, Bangladesh

Kalabagan Thana কলাবাগান থানা
- Thana
- Interactive map of Kalabagan Thana
- Coordinates: 23.74882°N 90.38182°E
- Country: Bangladesh
- Division: Dhaka Division
- District: Dhaka District

Area
  - Total: 1.26 km^{2} (0.49 sq mi)
- Elevation: 23 m (75 ft)

Population (2022)
  - Total: 114,254
  - Density: 94,175/km^{2} (243,910/sq mi)
- Time zone: UTC+6 (BST)
- Postal code: 1205
- Area code: 02

Kalabagan (Bengali: কলাবাগান) is a Thana in Dhaka, Bangladesh, adjacent to Dhanmondi and Jatiya Sangsad.

== Geography ==
Kalabagan is bounded by Sher-e-Bangla Nagar Thana and Tejgaon Thana on the north, New Market Thana on the south, Ramna Thana on the east and Dhanmondi Thana on the west. The thana has an area of 1.26 km^{2}.

== Demographics ==
Religions in Kalabagan Thana (2022)
Religion	Percent
Islam	93.60%
Hinduism	5.77%
Christianity	0.42%
Other or not stated	0.21%

According to the 2022 Bangladeshi census, Kalabagan Thana had 32,206 households and a population of 114,258. 5.17% of the population were under 5 years of age. Kalabagan had a literacy rate (age 7 and over) of 91.40%: 92.75% for males and 89.64% for females, and a sex ratio of 129.32 males for every 100 females.

According to the 2011 Census of Bangladesh, Kalabagan Thana had 20,672 households with average household size of 4.86 and a population of 118,660. Males constituted 57.11% (67,762) of the population while females 42.89% (50,898). Kalabagan had a literacy

rate (age 7 and over) of 82.0%, compared to the national average of 51.8%, and a sex ratio of 133.There were 720 floating people in this jurisdiction.

The religious breakdown was Muslim 94.49% (112,122), Hindu 4. 84% (5,740), Christian 0.47% (554), Buddhist 0.16% (184), and others 0.05% (60). The ethnic minority people living there were 237 persons in total.

== Education ==
There are many educational institutions located in Kalabagan Thana like Hamdard Public College and Dhaka Public College.

== Establishments ==
- Kalabagan Cricket Academy
- Kala Bagan Krira Chakra
