= Adabar Thana =

Thana of Dhaka North City Corporation, Bangladesh

Adabar আদাবর
- Thana
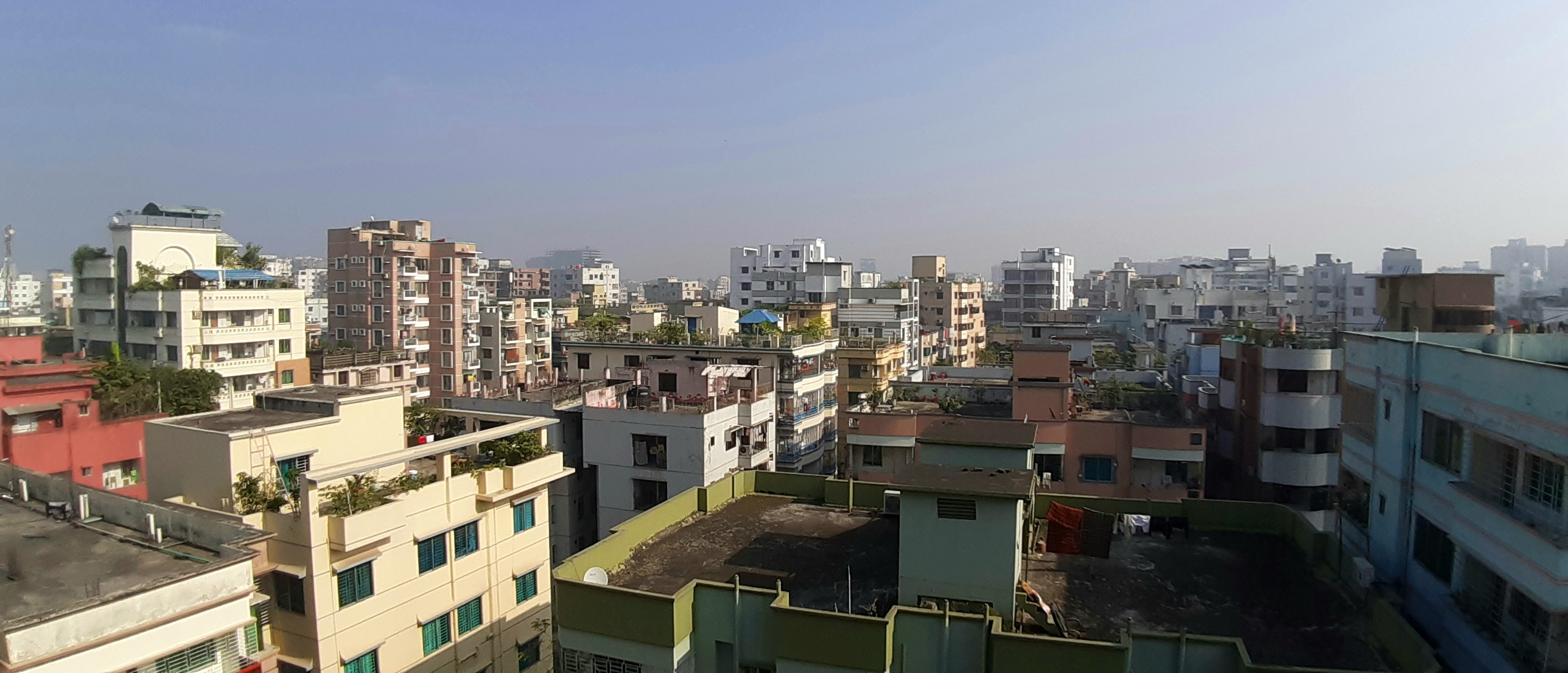
- Skyline of Adabar
- Interactive map of Adabar
- Location of Adabar Thana within Dhaka Location of Adabar within Dhaka Division Location of Adabar within Bangladesh
- Coordinates: 23.77132866°N 90.35915521°E
- Country: Bangladesh
- Division: Dhaka Division
- District: Dhaka District
- Established: 27 June 2007

Area
  - Total: 2.07 km^{2} (0.80 sq mi)
- Elevation: 23 m (75 ft)

Population (2022)
  - Total: 215,243
  - Density: 98,545/km^{2} (255,230/sq mi)
- Time zone: UTC+6 (BST)
- Postal code: 1207
- Area code: 02

Adabar Thana is an administrative and geographic unit of Dhaka North City Corporation under the jurisdiction of Dhaka District in Bangladesh. The area is located on the bank of Buriganga river and situated in the western part of Dhaka City. To the north, there is Darus Salam Thana, to the northern east, there is Sher-e-Bangla Nagar Thana, to the east and south, there is Mohammadpur Thana and to the west, there is Buriganga river and Savar Upazila. The Thana came into existence on 27 June in 2007 by splitting up Mohammadpur Thana. The area has 798 acres of land, which is 3.23 square kilometers.

== Geography ==
Located in between 23°45' and 23°46' north latitudes and in between 90°20' and 90°22' east longitudes, Adabar Thana is situated in the southwestern part of Dhaka City near the Buriganga River. The thana shares its borders mostly with Mohammadpur Thana and Darus Salam Thana. A small portion of the area near Shyamoli touches Sher-E-Bangla Nagar Thana on the northeast side. Savar Upazila and Keraniganj Upazila are just walking distances from the western side of the thana.

The Thana area includes Mohammadia Housing Society, Pisciculture Housing Society, Nobodoy Housing Society, Abdul Rafiq Housing, Japan Garden City, Shekhertek, Monsurabad Housing, North Adabar, Baitul Aman Housing Society, Krishi Market, Shia Mosque, Dhaka Housing, Prominent Housing, Shyamoli Housing, Turag Housing, Akkas Housing, Beribadh Ibn Sina Housing, Ekota Housing, Sunibir Housing, Alif Housing, Mofiz Housing, Mehedibagh Housing, Unique Housing, Adarsha Chayanir, Mohammadpur, Mohammadpur Housing, Adbar.

== Demographics ==
Religions in Adabar Thana (2022)
Religion	Percent
Islam	96.93%
Hinduism	2.70%
Other or not stated	0.37%

According to the 2022 Bangladeshi census, Adabar Thana had 58,336 households and a population of 215,246. 7.47% of the population were under 5 years of age. Adabar had a literacy rate (age 7 and over) of 83.75%: 84.51% for males and 82.86% for females, and a sex ratio of 116.14 males for every 100 females.

According to the 2011 Census of Bangladesh, Adabar Thana had 47,642 households with an average household size of 4.08 and a population of 203,989. Males constituted 53.61% (109,354) of the population, while females constituted 46.39% (94,635). Adabar had a literacy rate (age 7 and over) of 68.4%, compared to the national average of 51.8%, and a sex ratio of 116. There were 73 floating people in this jurisdiction.

The religious breakdown was Muslim 98.10% (200,107), Hindu 1.61% (3,281), Christian 0.20% (404), Buddhist 0.08% (156), and others 0.01% (41). The ethnic minority people living there were 251 persons in total.

== See also ==
- Mohammadpur Thana
- Dhaka
- Bangladesh
