= Tikatuli =

Coordinates: 23.7194°N 90.4205°E

Tikatuli is a residential/commercial neighborhood of Dhaka, the capital of Bangladesh.

== History ==
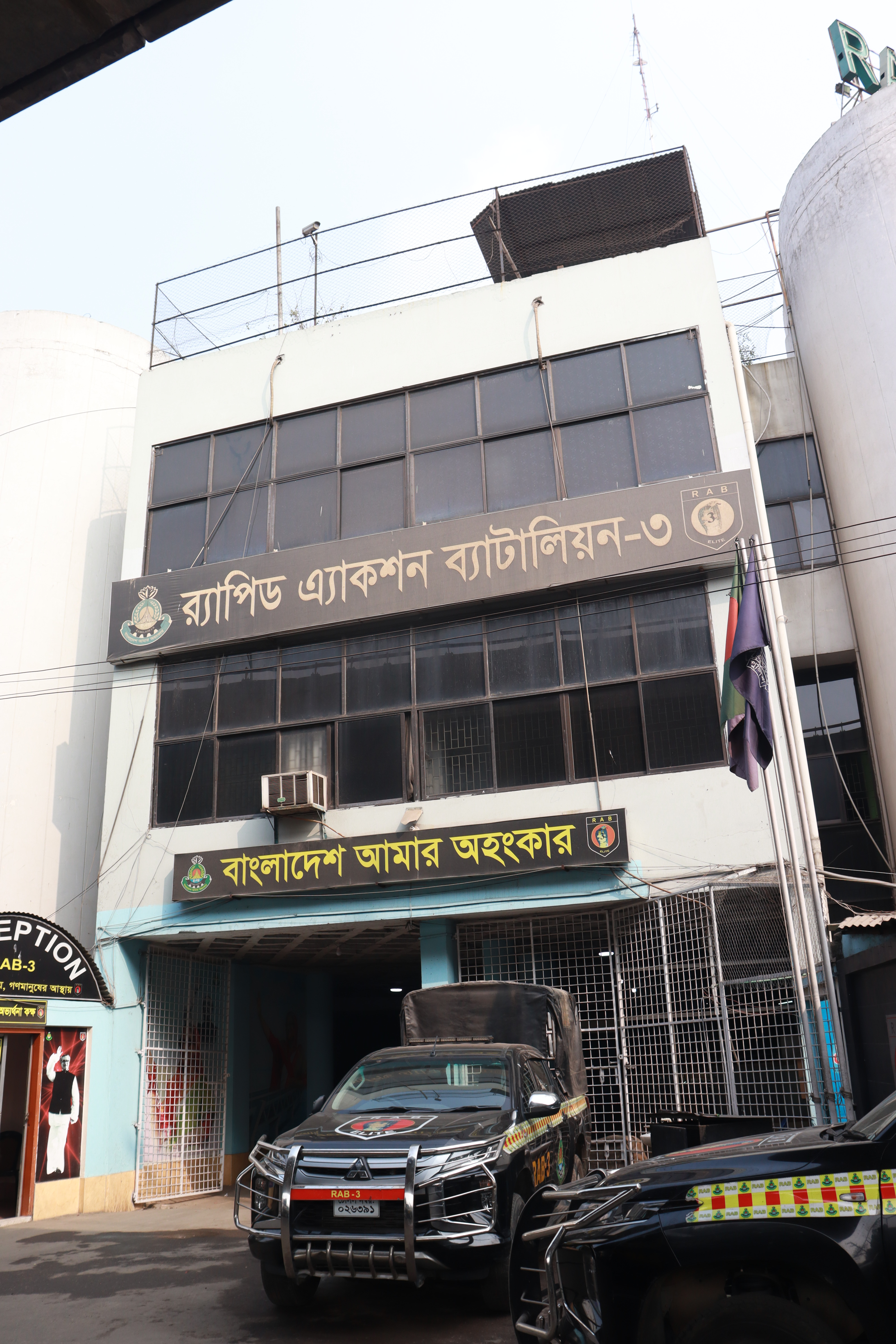
RAB headquarter in Tikatuli

The parents of the Indian mystic Anandamayi Ma used to live in Tikatuli. Rapid Action Battalion-3 has built their office what was used to be Tikatuli park. A community center was built on the park in the 1

990s, near Mayor Hanif flyover, and it was rented out to RAB.

== Culture ==
Pulin Behari Das, the bengali revolutionary, founded a gym in Tikatuli in 1903. The Bengal Motion Pictures Studio Ltd, one of the first and one of two private movie production studios in Dhaka is located in Taktuli. It was established in 1969 in Rose Garden Palace in Tikatuli The Rose Garden Palace was built by a Hindu lower caste zamindar (Landlord) Hrishikesh Das in the late 19th century.[1] Around that time jalsas (parties) held at Baldha Garden were an important part of the social life of the city's wealthier Hindu residents. The story goes that Hrishikesh Das, a zamidar (landlord) of Hindu lower caste background, being insulted on this account by someone at one of the jalsas (parties) at Baldha Garden, and decided to create his own garden to outshine that of Baldha Garden. Here he staged jalsas (parties) of his own. The centerpiece of the garden is an elegant pavilion. However, this was not created as a residence, but rather a setting for entertainment such as musical performances (although subsequent owners did use it as a house). This extravagant lifestyle caused Zamidar (Landlord) Hrishikesh Das to go bankrupt and consequently he was forced to sell the property.

In 1937 the Rose Garden Palace was bought by a prominent businessman Khan Bahadur Kazi Abdur Rashid of Dhaka from the family members of Late Bashiruddin Sarker, the Zamidar (Landlord) of Nabinagar under Brahmanbaria district. He renamed the building as Rashid Manzil. His eldest son Kazi Mohammed Bashir (Humayun) who carried his name and fame until this generation.

The building had been renovated by its previous owners while keeping the original character fully maintained.

The Government of Bangladesh bought the building for Tk 331.70 crore in a purchase announced on 9 August 2018.[2] The government has since announced plans to turn the location into a museum. There is a cinema hall, Abhisar Cinema Hall, in Tikatuli. The football club, Brothers Union, has a football ground in Tikatuli.

== Education ==
Kamrunnessa Govt Girls High School was established in 1924 in Tikatuli by members of the Dhaka Nawab family.
