= Kurmitola =

Kurmitola is a significant area in Dhaka, the capital of Bangladesh. It is part of the Dhaka Cantonment and is situated in the northern section of the city. The Kurmitola area is known for housing both military and civilian installations. It is located in close proximity to Hazrat Shahjalal International Airport and stretches along Airport Road.
