= Shah Ali Thana =

Thana in Dhaka North City Corporation, Bangladesh

Shah Ali Thana শাহ আলী থানা
- Thana
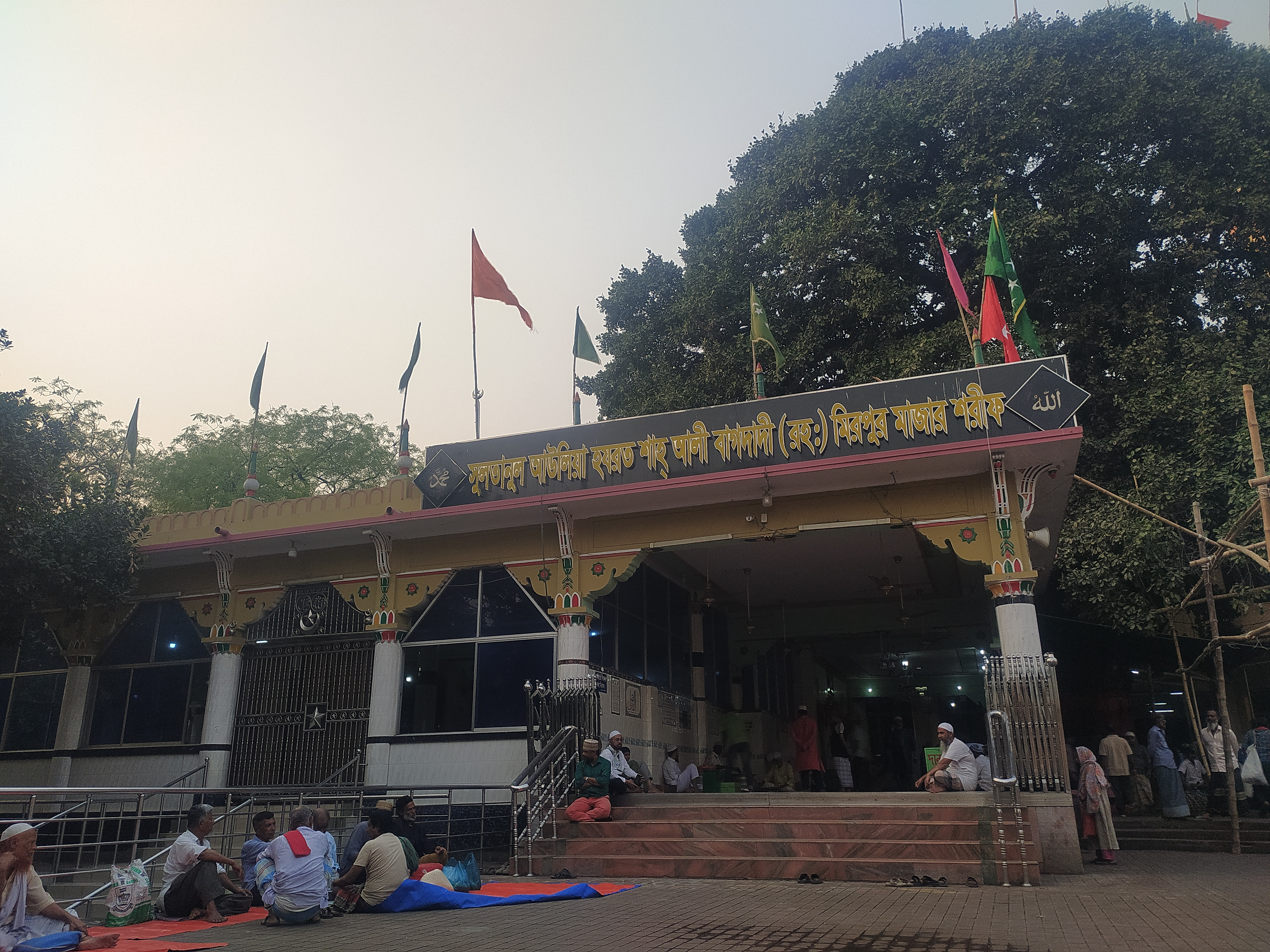
- Expandable map of vicinity of Shah Ali Thana
- Location of Shah Ali Thana within Dhaka Location of Shah Ali Thana within Dhaka Division Location of Shah Ali Thana within Bangladesh
- Coordinates: 23.80559°N 90.34881°E
- Country: Bangladesh
- Division: Dhaka Division
- District: Dhaka District
- Established as a thana: 2005

Area
  - Total: 5.15 km^{2} (1.99 sq mi)
- Elevation: 23 m (75 ft)

Population (2022)
  - Total: 151,756
  - Density: 22,425/km^{2} (58,080/sq mi)
- Time zone: UTC+6 (BST)
- Postal code: 1216
- Area code: 02

Shah Ali Thana is a thana of Dhaka District, Bangladesh.

== History ==
Shah Ali Thana was formed in 2005 and was named after Shah Ali, a Sufi saint.

== Demographics ==
Religions in Shah Ali Thana (2022)
Religion	Percent
Islam	98.08%
Hinduism	1.81%
Other or not stated	0.12%

According to the 2022 Bangladeshi census, Shah Ali Thana had 42,250 households and a population of 151,760. 7.55% of the population were under 5 years of age. Shah Ali had a literacy rate (age 7 and over) of 83.17%: 84.82% for males and 81.19% for females, and a sex ratio of 117.77 males for every 100 females.

According to 2011 Census of Bangladesh, Shah Ali Thana has a population of 115,489 with average household size of 4.1 members, and an average literacy rate of 71.0% vs national average of 51.8% literacy.
