= Kafrul Thana =

Thana in Dhaka North City Corporation, Bangladesh

Kafrul Thana কাফরুল থানা
- Thana
- Interactive map of Kafrul Thana
- Location of Kafrul Thana within Dhaka Location of Kafrul Thana within Dhaka Division Location of Kafrul Thana within Bangladesh
- Coordinates: 23.78956°N 90.39146°E
- Country: Bangladesh
- Division: Dhaka Division
- District: Dhaka District

Area
  - Total: 17.8 km^{2} (6.9 sq mi)
- Elevation: 23 m (75 ft)

Population (2022)
  - Total: 339,784
  - Density: 22,257/km^{2} (57,650/sq mi)
- Time zone: UTC+6 (BST)
- Postal code: 1206
- Area code: 02

Kafrul (Bengali: কাফরুল) is a thana of Dhaka District in Dhaka, Bangladesh.

== Geography ==
Kafrul thana borders Cantonment Thana on the north and east, Tejgaon Thana on the south, and Mirpur Thana and Sher-e-Bangla Nagar Thana on the west. Its total area is 17.8 km^{2}.

== Demographics ==
Religions in Kafrul Thana (2022)
Religion	Percent
Islam	96.37%
Hinduism	2.77%
Christianity	0.43%
Buddhism	0.40%
Other or not stated	0.03%

According to the 2022 Bangladeshi census, Kafrul Thana had 87,102 households and a population of 339,789. 6.91% of the population were under 5 years of age. Kafrul had a literacy rate (age 7 and over) of 89.67%: 91.12% for males and 87.89% for females, and a sex ratio of 121.38 males for every 100 females.

According to the 2011 Census of Bangladesh, Kafrul Thana had 91,248 households with an average household size of 4.09 and a population of 396,182. Males constituted 53.03% (210,106) of the population while females 46.97% (186,076). Kafrul had a literacy rate (age 7 and over) of 74.8%, compared to the national average of 51.8%, and a sex ratio of 113. There were 179 floating people in this jurisdiction.

The religious breakdown was Muslim 97.31% (385,511), Hindu 2.13% (8,444), Christian 0.39% (1,527), Buddhist 0.16% (631), and others 0.02% (69). The number of people of ethnic minorities living there were 673 people in total.

== Administration ==
Kafrul has 1 union/ward, 16 mauzas/mahallas, and 4 villages.

== See also ==
- Upazilas of Bangladesh
- Districts of Bangladesh
- Divisions of Bangladesh
- Thanas of Bangladesh
