= Cantonment Thana =

Thana in Dhaka North City Corporation, Bangladesh

Cantonment ক্যান্টনমেন্ট
- Thana
- Interactive map of Cantonment
- Coordinates: 23°49.3′N 90°24.5′E
- Country: Bangladesh
- Division: Dhaka Division
- District: Dhaka District

Area
  - Total: 14.47 km^{2} (5.59 sq mi)
- Elevation: 23 m (75 ft)

Population (2022)
  - Total: 135,785
  - Density: 9,113/km^{2} (23,600/sq mi)
- Time zone: UTC+6 (BST)
- Postal code: 1206
- Area code: 02
- Website: bangladesh.gov.bd/maps/images/dhaka/CantonmentT.gif

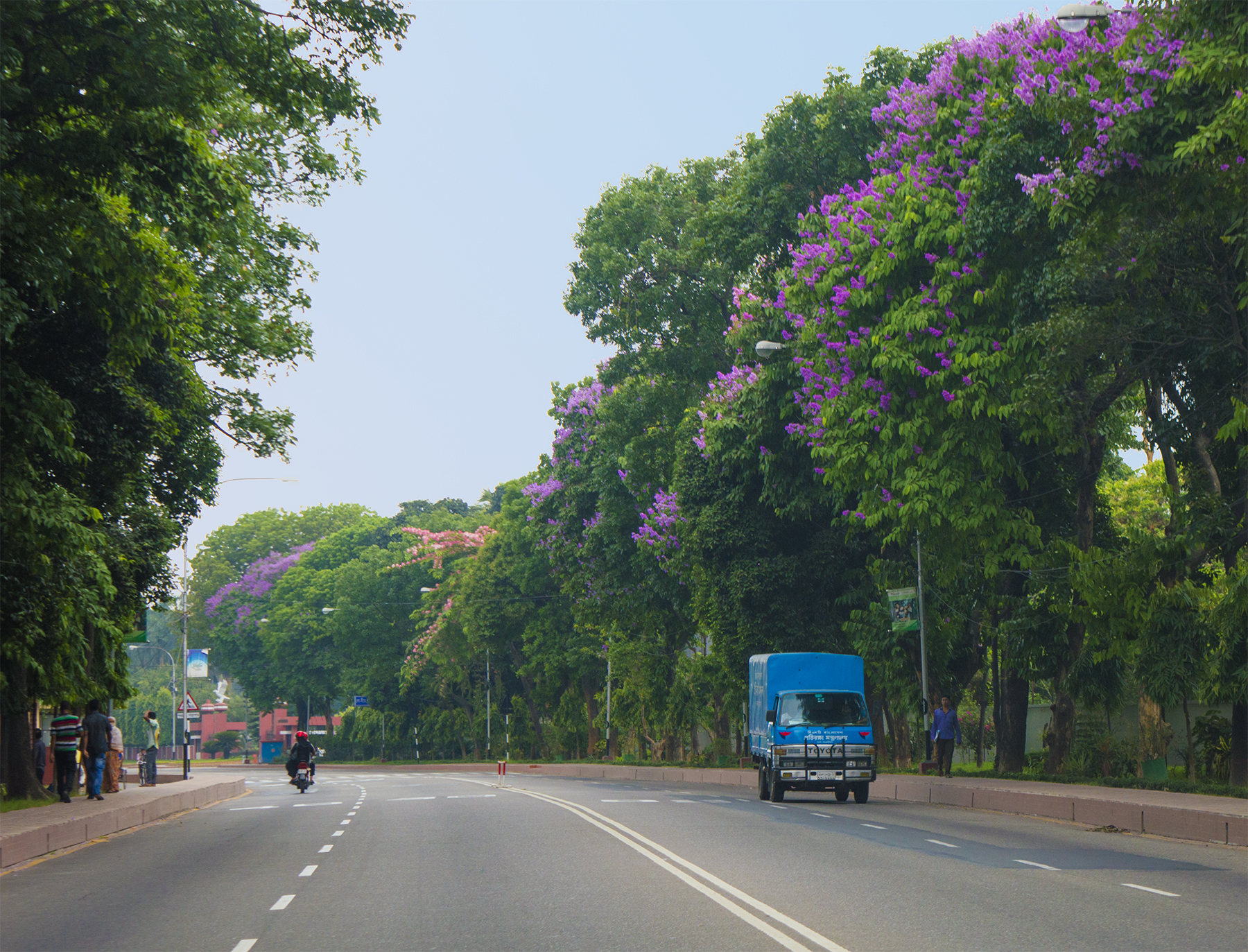
Cantonment Thana

Cantonment Thana (Bengali: ক্যান্টনমেন্ট) is a Thana of Dhaka district in Dhaka, Bangladesh. It includes the Army Headquarters, Naval Headquarters and the Air Force Headquarters. Cantonment Thana was formed in 1976.

== Geography ==
Cantonment is located at 23.8222°N 90.4083°E. It has 36540 units of household and total area 14.47 km^{2}.

== Demographics ==
Religions in Cantonment Thana (2022)
Religion	Percent
Islam	97.40%
Hinduism	1.94%
Other or not stated	0.66%

According to the 2022 Bangladeshi census, Cantonment Thana had 33,651 households and a population of 135,785. 6.98% of the population were under 5 years of age. Cantonment had a literacy rate (age 7 and over) of 94.30%: 95.80% for males and 92.59% for females, and a sex ratio of 113.09 males for every 100 females.

According to the 2011 Census of Bangladesh, Cantonment Thana had 25,198 households with an average household size of 4.42 and a population of 131,864. Males constituted 57.03% (75,201) of the population while females 42.97% (56,663). Cantonment Thana had a literacy rate (age 7 and over) of 84.9%, compared to the national

average of 51.8%, and a sex ratio of 133.There were 264 floating people in this jurisdiction.

The religious breakdown was Muslim 98.00% (129,230), Hindu 1.40% (1,844), Christian 0.39% (515), Buddhist 0.17% (219), and others 0.04% (56). The ethnic minority people living there were 144 people in total.

== See also ==
- Upazilas of Bangladesh
- Districts of Bangladesh
- Divisions of Bangladesh
- Thanas of Bangladesh
