= List of Constituent Colleges and Institutes under the University of Dhaka =

== Medical institutes ==
Government

- Institute of Health Technology (IHT), Dhaka
- Institute of Public Health

Private

- Bangladesh Health Professions Institute
- Bangladesh Institute of Child Health
- Institute of Medical Technology, Mirpur-12, Dhaka
- International Institute of Health Sciences (IIHS), Dhaka
- International medical college, Health technology unit, Gazipur
- National Institute of Traumatology & Orthopedic Rehabilitation Centre
- Saic Institute of Medical Technology, Dhaka
- State College of Health Sciences, Dhaka
- Trauma Institute of Medical Technology, Mirpur Dhaka

== Engineering and technology ==
Government

- Mymensingh Engineering College (MEC)
- Faridpur Engineering College (FEC)
- Barishal Engineering College (BEC)

Private

- National Institute of Textile Engineering & Research (NITER)
- Shyamoli Engineering College (ShEC)
- Saic Institute of Management and Technology (SIMT)
- K.M. Humayun Kabir Engineering College (KMHKEC)

== Health sciences colleges ==
=== Homeopathic, Unani and Ayurvedic colleges ===
Government

- Government Homeopathic Medical College & Hospital
- Government Unani and Ayurvedic Medical College & Hospital

Private

- Bangladesh Homeopathic Medical College and Hospital (BHMCH)

=== Dental colleges ===
Government

- Dhaka Dental College

Private

- Pioneer Dental College
- City Dental College
- University Dental College
- Sapporo Dental College
- Bangladesh Dental College
- Marks Dental College
- Update Dental College
- Saphena Women’s Dental College & Hospital
- Mandy Dental College

=== Medical colleges ===
Government

- Dhaka Medical College
- Mymensingh Medical College
- Faridpur Medical College
- Shaheed Suhrawardy Medical College
- Shaheed Tajuddin Ahmad Medical College
- Shahid Syed Nazrul Islam Medical College
- Gopalganj Medical College Hospital
- Manikganj Medical College
- Sher-e-Bangla Medical College
- Sir Salimullah Medical College
- Jamalpur Medical College
- Tangail Medical College
- Mugda Medical College
- Patuakhali Medical College

Private

- Abdul Hamid Medical College
- Ad-din Women's Medical College
- AICHI Medical College
- Anwer Khan Modern Medical College
- Ashiyan Medical College
- Bangladesh Medical College
- Bashundhara Ad-din Medical College
- Bikrampur Bhuiyan Medical College
- CARe Medical College
- City Medical College
- Community Based Medical College, Bangladesh
- Delta Medical College
- Dhaka Central International
- Dhaka Community Medical College
- Dhaka National Medical College
- Diabetic Association Medical College
- Dr. Sirajul Islam Medical College
- East-West Medical College
- Enam Medical College
- Gonoshasthaya Samaj Vittik Medical College
- Green Life Medical College
- Holy Family Red Crescent Medical College
- Ibn Sina Medical College
- Ibrahim Medical College
- International Medical College
- Jahurul Islam Medical College
- Kumudini Women’s Medical College
- M.H. Shamorita Medical College
- Marks Medical College
- Medical College for Women
- Monno Medical College
- Nightingale Medical College
- Northern International Medical College
- Popular Medical College
- Shahabuddin Medical College
- Shaheed Monsur Ali Medical College
- Tairunnessa Memorial Medical College
- Universal Medical College
- US-Bangla Medical College
- Uttara Adhunik Medical College
- Zainul Haque Sikder Women's Medical College

=== Nursing colleges ===
Government

- College of Nursing
- Dhaka Nursing College
- Mymensingh Nursing College
- Barisal Nursing College
- Rajshahi Nursing College
- Chattagram Nursing College
- Rangpur Nursing College
- Sylhet Nursing College
- Dinjapur Nursing College
- Manikganj Nursing College
- Shaheed Tajuddin Ahmad Nursing College

Private

- Daffodil Nursing College (DNC)
- Universal Nursing College
- Enam Nursing College
- Square College of Nursing
- United College of Nursing
- East-West Nursing College
- Kumudini Nursing College
- BIRDEM Nursing College
- CRP Nursing College
- Shaheed Monsur Ali Nursing Institute, Dhaka
- Sheikh Fazilatunnesa Mujib Memorial KPJ Nursing College
- Grameen Caledonian College of Nursing
- Sylhet Women's Nursing College
- Florence College of Nursing, Tangail
- Doctor Zafor Nursing College
- Gazi Munibur Rahman Nursing College

== Home economic colleges ==
Government

- Govt. College of Applied Human Science (Previously, College of Home Economics)

Private

- Akij College of Home Economics
- Bangladesh Home Economics College
- Mymensingh Home Economic College
- National College of Home Economics

== Institutes ==
- Confucius Institute
- Dhaka School of Economics (DScE)
- Institute of Energy (IE)
- Institute of Statistical Research and Training
