= Toufic Ahmad Choudhury =

Bangladesh economist and banker

Toufic Ahmad Choudhury is a Bangladesh economist and banker. He is the former director general of the Bangladesh Institute of Bank Management. He is the director general of the Bangladesh Academy for Securities Markets, a wing of the Bangladesh Securities and Exchange Commission. He is a founding member of the Dhaka School of Economics. He is an independent director at Eastern Bank.

== Early life ==
Choudhury did his undergraduate at Jahangirnagar University in 1979 and his PhD at Himachal Pradesh University in 1990.

== Career ==
Chwodhury joined the Bangladesh Institute of Development Studies as a research associate. He joined the Bangladesh Institute of Bank Management as a lecturer in 1981and became a full professor in 1997. He is the chairperson of the audit committee and member of the risk management committee of Eastern Bank Limited.

Choudhury called for allowing Farmers Bank to die, contradicting the minister of finance Abul Maal Abdul Muhith who advocated for saving the bank. He blamed the high interest rates in Bangladesh on the large number of defaulted loans in July 2019. He is a director of EBL Investments Limited. He is an ambassador of Valor of Bangladesh.

Choudhury is a member of the board of governors of the Bangladesh Academy for Securities Markets. He is an independent director at Eastern Bank and C&A Textiles Limited. He is a founding member of the governing body of the Dhaka School of Economics. He is an adjunct faculty of East West University. He is the chairperson of D.Net. He is a member of the Bangladesh Economic Association. He is a director of the National Credit Ratings Limited.

== Bibliography ==
- Banking Research Series 2019: A Compilation of Research Workshop Papers
