= Jamal Uddin Ahmed (banker) =

Bangladeshi banker

- Born: Bangladesh
- Education: University of Dhaka
- Occupation(s): Banker, accountant
- Known for: Chairperson of Janata Bank

Jamal Uddin Ahmed is a Bangladeshi banker and accountant who was the former chairperson of Janata Bank, the second largest state owned commercial bank in Bangladesh.

He is the general secretary of Bangladesh Economic Association.

== Early life and education ==
Ahmed completed his undergrad and masters in accounting from the University of Dhaka in 1977 and 1978 respectively. He completed his PhD from Cardiff Business School in 1996.

== Career ==
In 1985, Ahmed became an associate member of Institute of Chartered Accountants of Bangladesh. Ahmed received his Institute of Chartered Accountants of Bangladesh in 1990.

In 2009, Ahmed became the chairperson of Emerging Credit Rating Limited.

Ahmed became a director of Dhaka Stock Exchange in 2010. He became a director of Grameenphone in 2011. He served on the board of directors of Power Grid Company of Bangladesh Limited.

In 2015, Ahmed became the general secretary of the Bangladesh Economic Association. He was re-elected in 2017 with Dr Abul Barakat being elected president of the Bangladesh Economic Association.

From August 2019 to July 2020, Ahmed was the chairperson of Janata Bank. On 28 July 2020, S. M. Mahfuzur Rahman was appointed chairperson of Janata Bank replacing Ahmed, who had faced allegations of graft in approving loans. He denied all allegations against him. He had opposed large loans of Janata Bank. Hedayetullah Al Mamun was briefly appointed chairman but removed soon after his appointment. Bangladesh Pratidin later reported that both men were removed through the effort of S. Alam, owner of S. Alam Group, who had secured large loans from various banks including Janata Bank through close connections with the Awami League government.

From 2023 to 2024, Ahmed was a member of the syndicate body of Bangladesh University of Engineering and Technology.
