= Ad-din Foundation =

Bangladesh nonprofit organization

Ad-din Foundation is a non-profit foundation in Bangladesh that provides social and healthcare services to the poor.

== History ==
The organization was set up in 1980 in Jessore District by Sheikh Akijuddin and Mohammad Sharif Husain. The charity runs a hospital, Ad-din women's medical college, orphanages, and social programs like HIV awareness. The hospitals are located in Moghbazar, Dhaka, Khulna, Jashore and Munshiganj. The foundation also runs Bashundhara Ad-din Medical College, Ad-din Akij medical college and Ad-din Akij medical college.

In 2026, the women's medical college came under scrutiny due to the death of 6 newborn.
