= Golartek =

Village in Dhaka District, Bangladesh

Coordinates: 23.793°N 90.343°E

Golartek (Bengali: গোলারটেক) is a village in Darus Salam Thana, Dhaka District, Bangladesh. According to the 2011 Bangladesh census, the population of the village was 5,262.

== Geography ==
Golartek is situated besides Turag River. Besides Sha Ali Thana to the west it is bounded by Savar Upazila.
