= S. M. Mahfuzur Rahman =

Bangladeshi academic, and educationist

Vice-Chancellor of BGMEA University of Fashion & Technology
- Incumbent
- Assumed office 12 March 2020
- Chancellor: President Mirza Fakhrul Islam Alamgir

Personal details
- Education: University of Dhaka; Peoples' Friendship University of Russia
- Profession: Educationist, academic

S. M. Mahfuzur Rahman is a Bangladeshi academic and former chairperson of Janata Bank. He is the vice-chancellor of BGMEA University of Fashion & Technology. He is a former professor of finance at the University of Dhaka. He is a former chairman of the Investment Corporation of Bangladesh.

== Early life ==
Rahman completed his PhD from the Moscow Institute of Oriental Studies in 1972. He completed his second masters in economics in 1979 from the Peoples' Friendship University of Russia.

== Career ==
Rahman joined the University of Dhaka in 1984 as a lecturer in the Department of Finance.

In 1998, Rahman worked as a visiting faculty at the Nagoya University in Japan. He had served a term as the general secretary, and previously treasurer, of the Asiatic Society of Bangladesh. He is a Board of Trustee member of Banglapedia, the national encyclopedia published by the Asiatic Society of Bangladesh. He was a director of Bangladesh Development Bank Limited.

Rahman had taught at the University of Dhaka and served as the chairperson of the Department of Banking and Insurance from 1994 to 1997. He had also served a tenure as the chairperson of the Investment Corporation of Bangladesh in 2011. He left the University of Dhaka in 2019. He had also been the general secretary of the Bangladesh Economics Association.

Rahman was the chief returning officer of the 2019 Dhaka University Central Students' Union election. He expressed "embarrassment" over "irregularities" in the election process.

On 26 January 2020, Rahman was appointed vice-chancellor of BGMEA University of Fashion & Technology. He is a former director of Rupali Bank Limited. On 28 July 2020, Rahman was appointed chairperson of Janata Bank replacing Jamal Uddin Ahmed, who had faced allegations of graft in approving loans.

Rahman was the chief returning officer of the 2021 Dhaka University Central Students' Union election.
