= Qazi Kholiquzzaman Ahmad =

Bangladeshi economist (born c.1943)

- কাজী খলীকুজ্জমান আহমদ
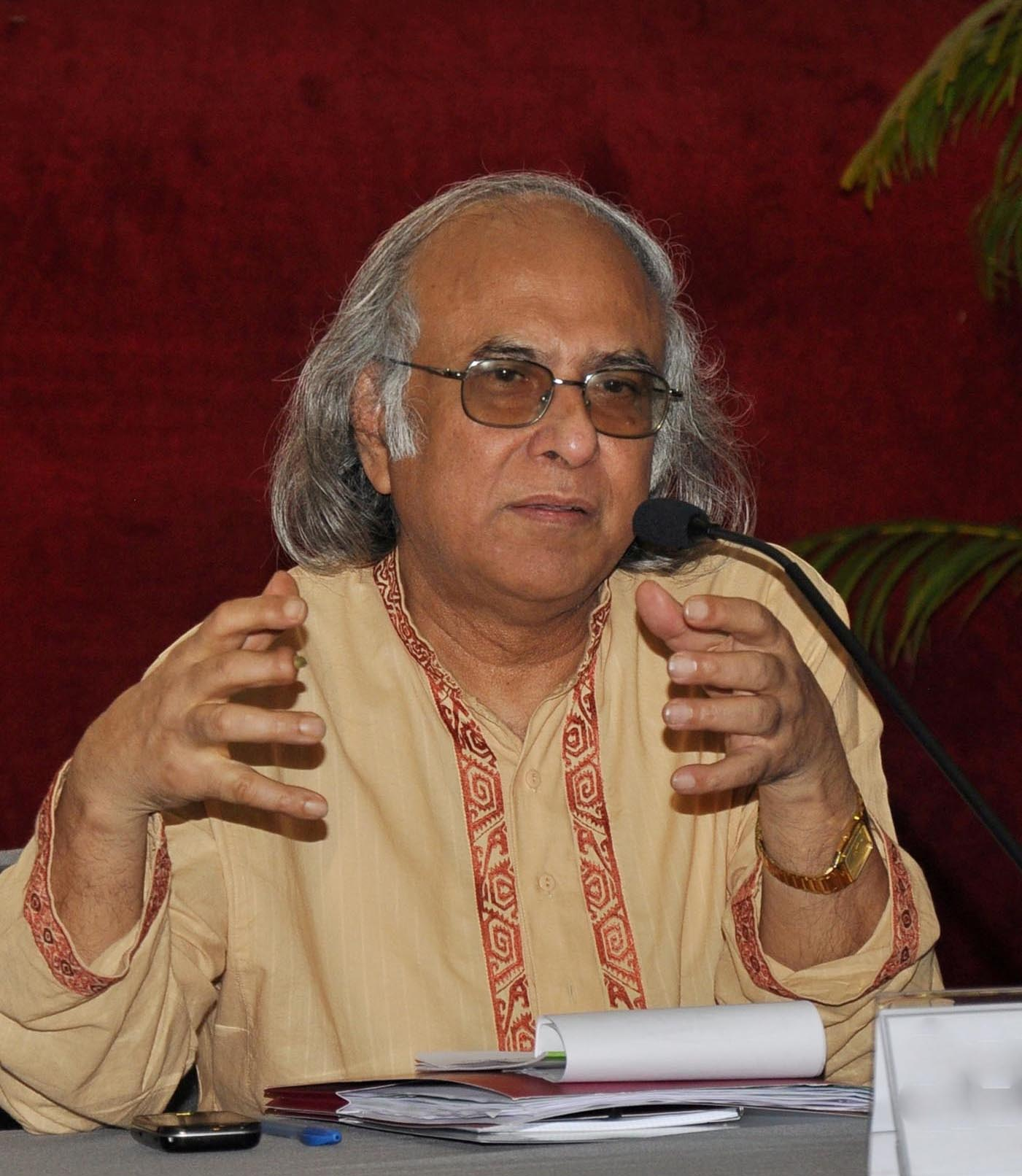
- Born: c. 1943 (age 82–83); Sylhet District, Assam Province, British India
- Education: University of Dhaka; London School of Economics
- Occupations: Economist, environmentalist
- Known for: President of Bangladesh Economic Association (2024-26); Chairman of Dhaka School of Economics and Former Chairman of Palli Karma-Sahayak Foundation
- Spouse: Zaheda Ahmad
- Website: qkahmad.info

Qazi Kholiquzzaman Ahmad (Bengali: কাজী খলীকুজ্জমান আহমদ; born c. 1943) is a Bangladeshi economist and development thinker and activist. He is currently the chairman of Dhaka School of Economics (DScE), a constituent institution of the University of Dhaka, devoted to post-graduate studies in economics and related subjects. He is former chairman (November, 2009 to September, 2023) of Palli Karma-Sahayak Foundation (PKSF), which is largest rural development funding, skill development and management support agency in Bangladesh. He received the highest national civilian award Independence Award 2019; and Ekushe Padak 2009, presented by the Government of Bangladesh.

== Early life and education ==
Ahmad was born in c. 1943 to a Bengali Muslim Qazi family in Sylhet District, Assam Province. His father, Mumtazul Muhaddithin Moulana Qazi Muhammad Mufazzal Hussain of Karimganj, was an Islamic scholar who served as a member of the Assam Legislative Assembly from 1946 to 1952, and later as a college professor. Ahmad was taught by his father until he went to school at the 8th grade. He achieved outstanding results in both secondary and higher secondary levels. He studied at the University of Dhaka, obtaining BA (Hons) in economics and MA (Econ.) degrees in 1961 and 1962 respectively. Later, he went to the London School of Economics (LSE), University of London, on a national merit fellowship and obtained MPhil (Econ.) and PhD (Econ.) degrees.

He was active in promoting Bangladesh's nationalist aspirations during the 1960s and a participant in the Bangladesh Liberation War in 1971, as a Planning Cell member of the then Bangladesh government-in-exile.

== Career ==
Ahmad spent 23 years in a research career at Bangladesh Institute of Development Studies (BIDS) and its predecessor Pakistan Institute of Development Economics (PIDE), having been a Research Director for a number of years. He left BIDS in 1987 and then worked as the chairman (chief executive) of Bangladesh Unnayan Parishad (BUP), which he helped, set up in 1980. He left BUP on taking over as chairman of the Governing Body of PKSF in November 2009. He is the founder chairman of Dhaka School of Economics -DScE, established in August 2010. He was elected president of Bangladesh Economic Association (BEA), the apex body of economists of Bangladesh, for consecutive three terms from 2002 to 2010.

He was coordinating lead author and lead author of the Third and the Fourth Assessments respectively of Intergovernmental Panel on Climate Change (IPCC), published respectively in 2001 and 2007. He was president of the Kuala Lumpur-based Association of Development Research and Training Institutes of Asia and the Pacific—ADIPA (which is now renamed the Asian Political and International Studies Association—APISA) from 1979 to 1983 and vice-president of the Rome-based Society for International Development (SID) from 1988 to 1991. He led many UN FAO/WFP food and crop assessment missions during the 1990s and early 2000s to food deficit African and Asian countries facing food crisis due to natural disasters and civil strife.

In addition to his other responsibilities, he has been the Coordinator of Bangladesh Climate Change Negotiation Team within the framework of the United Nations Framework Convention on Climate Change (UNFCCC). He represented Bangladesh in the UN Open Working Group (OWG) on Post-2015 Sustainable Development Goals (SDGs). He was also, until January 2015, a member of the executive board of Clean Development Mechanism (CDM) of the Kyoto Protocol, representing non-Annex-1 countries. He is also the Chairman of the National Committee of the Bangladesh Economics Olympiad.

== Publications ==
His publications and research and other works include 40 books and over 250 articles, research reports and unpublished papers. He has also contributed numerous columns in newspapers. He is a well-known expert on water and climate change issues. Some of Ahmad's publications are listed below:

- Ahmad, Qazi Kholiquzzaman; Hossain, Mahabub (1984). Rural Poverty Alleviation in Bangladesh Experiences and Policies. Food and Agriculture Organisation of the United Nation. OCLC 33289252.
- —— (1995). Development and Democracy: Must There be Winners and Losers?. Dhaka: Bangladesh Unnayan Parishad. ISBN 978-984-8126-08-0.
- Warrick, Richard A.; Ahmad, Qazi Kholiquzzaman, eds. (1996). The Implications of Climate and Sea-Level Change for Bangladesh. Dordrecht: Kluwer Academic Publishers. ISBN 978-0-7923-4001-0.
- —— (1998). Economic Reforms, People's Participation, and Development in Bangladesh. Dhaka: Asiatic Society of Bangladesh & Bangladesh Unnayan Parishad. ISBN 978-984-8126-09-7.
- —— (2001). Ganges-Brahmaputra-Meghna Region: A Framework for Sustainable Development. Dhaka: University Press Limited. ISBN 978-984-05-1608-7.
- Mirza, M. Monirul Qader; Ahmad, Qazi Kholiquzzaman, eds. (2005). Climate Change and Water Resources in South Asia. Leiden: A.A. Balkema. ISBN 0-415-36442-6.
- ——, ed. (2005). Emerging Global Economic Order and the Developing Countries. Dhaka: University Press Limited. ISBN 984-0517-57-0.
- ——, ed. (2007). Socio-Economic and Indebtedness-Related Impact of Micro-Credit in Bangladesh. Dhaka: University Press. ISBN 978-984-0517-78-7.
- Mirza, M. Monirul Qader; Ahmed, Ahsan Uddin; Ahmad, Qazi Kholiquzzaman, eds. (2008). Interlinking of Rivers in India: Issues and Concerns. Boca Raton: CRC Press. ISBN 978-0-203-89457-6.
- —— (2016). Sustainable Development and All That. Dhaka: Pathak Shamabesh. ISBN 978-984-92338-3-1.
- —— (2017). Environment, Climate Change and Water Resources. Dhaka: Pathak Shamabesh. ISBN 978-984-92340-2-9.
- —— (2018). Socio-Economics of Bangladesh Through the Decades. Dhaka: Pathak Shamabesh. ISBN 978-984-92330-7-7.
- —— (2019). Perspectives on People Centered Development with Particular Reference to Bangladesh. Dhaka: Aloghor Prokashona. ISBN 978-984-94244-2-0.
- —— (2019). Abasthā badalera janya byabasthā badalera sandhāne. Dhaka: Palaka Publishers. ISBN 978-984-8143-05-6.
- Hossain, Moazzem; Ahmad, Qazi Kholiquzzaman; Islam, Mohammad Mazharul, eds. (2020). Climate Adaptation for a Sustainable Economy: Lessons from Bangladesh, an Emerging Tiger of Asia. New York: Nova Science Publishers. ISBN 978-1-5361-6927-0.

== Awards ==
He received many national and international awards including the following:

- 2005: Received Mercantile Bank Award-2005.
- 2007: Is a Member of the 2007 Nobel Peace Prize winning UN Intergovernmental Panel on Climate Change -IPCC Team.
- 2009: Was awarded the Ekushey Padak 2009.
- 2012: He was awarded Bangladesh Economic Association (BEA) Gold Medal.
- 2019: National Environment Award 2019 by the State.
- 2019: Independence Award 2019, the highest Civilian Award by Government of Bangladesh.
