= Mirpur College =

Bangladeshi College

- মিরপুর কলেজ
- Seal of Mirpur College
- Former name: Mirpur University College
- Type: Private college
- Established: 1970; 56 years ago
- Academic affiliation: National University
- Principal: H. M. Mahbubur Rahman (in charge)
- Students: 8,000
- Location: Mirpur, Dhaka, Bangladesh; 23.8042°N 90.3605°E
- Campus: Urban, 2 acres (0.81 ha)
- Website: mirpurcollege.edu.bd

Mirpur College (formerly known as Mirpur University College) is a private college in Mirpur, Dhaka, Bangladesh. It is affiliated to National University, and is the only master's level college in Mirpur Model Thana.

== History ==
Mirpur College was founded in 1970 and moved to its present campus in 1988.

Lecturer Md. Ghulam Wadud was elevated to acting principal in February 2012 by MP Aslamul Haque, who chaired the college's governing body. In June 2021, the Ministry of Education investigated allegations by teachers and found that Wadud had been embezzling from the college since shortly after his appointment. He denied any wrongdoing, but was suspended in August and Vice Principal H. M. Mahbubur Rahman made acting principal.

== Faculty and Departments ==
=== Higher Secondary ===
- Science
- Arts
- Business Studies

=== Faculty of Social Science ===
- Economics
- Social Work
- Political Science

=== Faculty of Business Administration ===
- Accounting
- Marketing
- Management
- Finance and Banking
- Tourism and Hospitality Management (Professional)

=== Faculty of Science ===
- Computer Science and Engineering (CSE)
