= Monipur High School and College =

- মনিপুর উচ্চ বিদ্যালয় এবং কলেজ
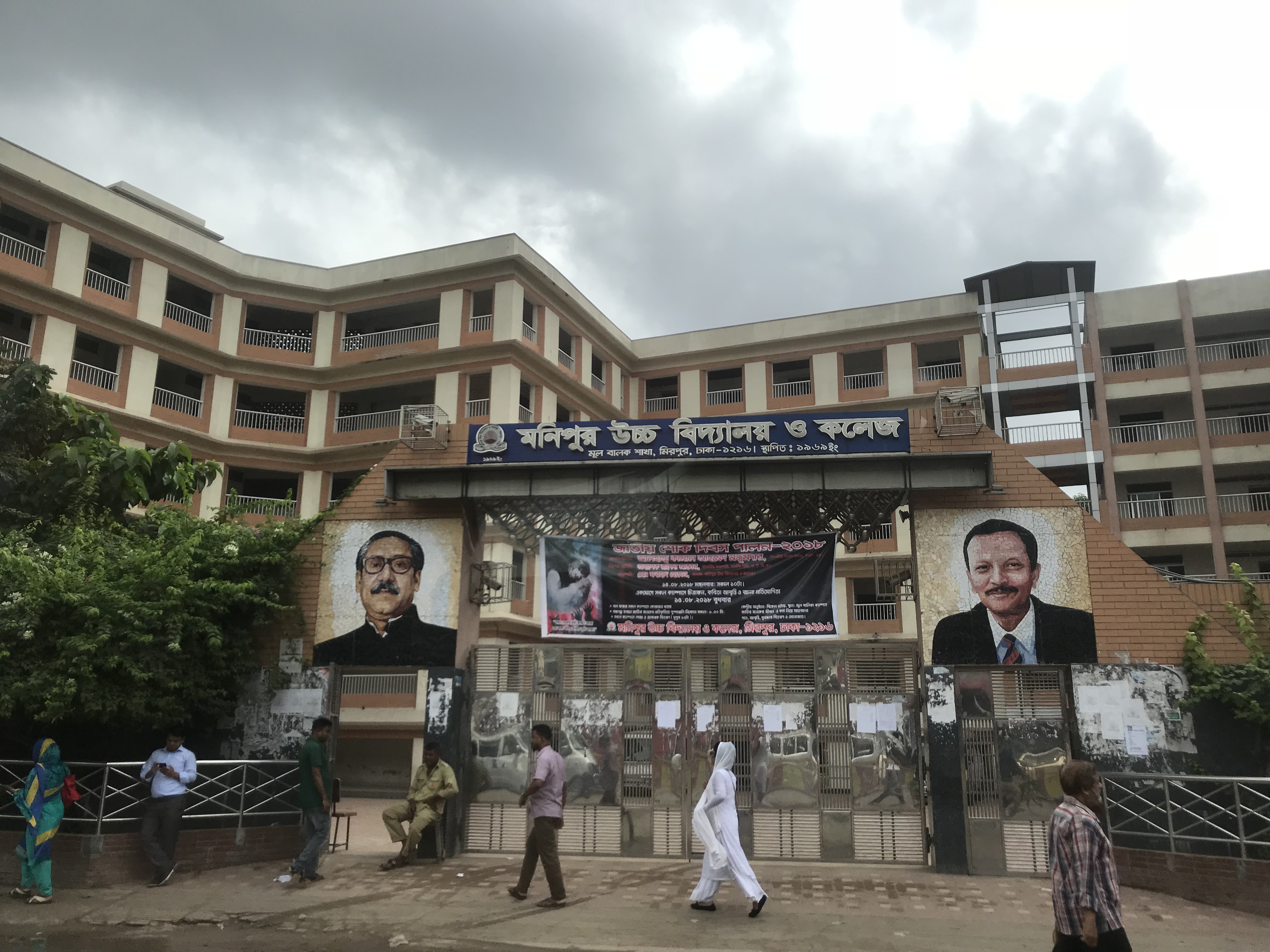
- Campus of Boys' Main Branch in Mirpur-2
- Bangladesh

Information
- School type: Private secondary and higher secondary college
- Established: 1969
- Founder: Hazi Noor Mohammod
- Status: Active
- School board: Board of Intermediate and Secondary Education, Dhaka
- School code: 108181
- President: Tasauf Islam Taif (2024-Present)
- Principal: Sirajul Islam (2025- Present)
- Grades: 1-12
- Gender: Male and Female
- Age range: 6-18
- Enrollment: 30000+
- Language: Bangla, English
- Campuses: Monipur School and College (Main Girls) Monipur School and College (Main Boys); Monipur School and College (Branch-1); Monipur School and College (Branch-2); Monipur School and College (Brainch-3) Monipur School and College (Collage Campus)
- Campus type: Urban
- Colors: Boys: White (Shirt); Navy Blue (Pant); Girls: White (Salwar); White (Kameez)
- Sports: Football, basketball, cricket, volleyball, badminton, handball, Chess
- Accreditation: Dhaka Education Board
- National ranking: 2nd (based on Board Exam Results)
- Website: mubc.edu.bd

Monipur Uchcha Vidyalaya and College (MUBC) (Bengali: মনিপুর উচ্চ বিদ্যালয় এবং কলেজ) is a secondary school and college in Mirpur, Dhaka, Bangladesh. It was established in 1969 by the late Hazi Noor Mohammad. The school offers education from class I to class XII, and the college offers undergraduate courses in science, and commerce. The school has Two main Branches (Boys and Girls main) and 3 associate branches across Mirpur including Branch-1 in Rupnagar, Branch-2 in Kafrul and Branch-3 in Shewrapara. The school and college are affiliated with the National Curriculum and Textbook Board (NCTB) and the University of Dhaka, respectively.

It is one of the oldest and renowned institutes in the country. The school often ranks among the top of the passing grade in the board exams such as Secondary School Certificate (SSC), Junior School Certificate (JSC), and Primary Education Certificate (PSC).

== Academic results ==
In 2007, 2008, and 2009, the school was ranked third, and in 2010 and 2011 the school ranked sixth and seventh respectively and was ranked eighth in the 2012 SSC examination under the Dhaka Education Board. From 2011 to 2019 this school was ranked first in the PEC examination.

The school secured the second position in terms of securing the highest number of first divisions in the primary terminal examinations across the country in 2010. A total of 1,516 students achieved first division from Viqarunnisa Noon School and College while 1,126 from Monipur High School & College and 962 from Ideal School and College.

652 students scored 80% mark called A+ (or GPA 5.0) in 2008 and 556 students achieved the same in 2009, placing the school in the top three in Bangladesh's GPA 5 based schools ranking.

The school has achieved second place in the evaluation examination of class Eight held under the Department of Secondary and Higher Education.

== Campuses ==
Following demands to enroll more students, the school authorities opened three more branches in Dhaka city, while the main campus at Monipur continues to operate. Monipur High School opened its college section in 2012 with about 52 students. The college section is situated at the Rupnagar branch (Branch-1) with its own dedicated campus. Which means there are now five school campuses and one college branch.

1. Main Branch (60 Feet)

2. Main Branch (Monipur)

3. Branch - 01

4. Branch - 02

5. Branch - 03

6. College Branch

== Administration ==
- Founder: Hazi Noor Mohammad
- President: Tasauf Islam Taif
- Principal & Headteacher: Sirajul Islam

== Legal Issues ==
In 2023, the institution was accused of tax fraud and embezzlement of more than 3.5 crore BDT ($326,558). The investigation is underway.

== See also ==
- Directorate of Secondary and Higher Education (DSHE)
- Education in Bangladesh
