= Darus Salam Thana =

Thana in Dhaka North City Corporation, Bangladesh

Darus Salam Thana দারুস সালাম থানা
- Thana
- Interactive map of Darus Salam Thana
- Location of Darus Salam Thana within Dhaka Location of Darus Salam Thana within Dhaka Division Location of Darus Salam Thana within Bangladesh
- Coordinates: 23.7922°N 90.3430°E
- Country: Bangladesh
- Division: Dhaka Division
- District: Dhaka District
- As a police Station: 23 August 2008

Area
  - Total: 4.98 km^{2} (1.92 sq mi)
- Elevation: 23 m (75 ft)

Population (2022)
  - Total: 211,286
  - Density: 31,956/km^{2} (82,770/sq mi)
- Time zone: UTC+6 (BST)
- Postal code: 1216
- Area code: 02

Darus Salam Thana is a thana, located in Mirpur-01, Dhaka-1216, Bangladesh. Which was created on 23 August 2008 from areas under the Mirpur Thana.

== History ==
During the Bangladesh Liberation War, Bengali intellectuals were killed by the Pakistan Army around this area. After the Independence of Bangladesh, The Mirpur Martyred Intellectuals Memorial (Bengali: মিরপুর শহীদ বুদ্ধিজীবী স্মৃতিসৌধ) was constructed for these intellectuals.

The thana is under the jurisdiction of the Darus Salam Police Station of the Bangladesh Police, who are responsible for law enforcement in the thana. The police station was established on 23 September 2008.

== Demographics ==
Religions in Darus salam Thana (2022)
Religion	Percent
Islam	96.32%
Hinduism	3.49%
Other or not stated	0.19%

According to the 2022 Bangladeshi census, Darus Salam Thana had 57,042 households and a population of 211,296. 8.08% of the population were under 5 years of age. Darus Salam had a literacy rate (age 7 and over) of 83.39%: 84.36% for males and 82.21% for females, and a sex ratio of 118.46 males for every 100 females.

According to the 2011 Census of Bangladesh, Darus Salam Thana had 37,264 households with an average household size of 3.94 and a population of 159,139. Men constituted 54.62% (86,926) of the population while women accounted for 45.38% (72,213) of the population. Darus Salam Thana had a literacy rate (age 7 and over) of 67.2%, compared to the national average of 51.8%, and a sex ratio of 120. There were 872 floating people in this jurisdiction.

The religious breakdown was Muslim 96.43% (153,465), Hindu 3.42% (5,441), Christian 0.12% (184), Buddhist 0.02% (35), and others 0.01% (14). 22 ethnic people were living there.

== Notable educational institutions ==
There are four notable educational institutions in the thana according to Banglapedia.

- Govt. Bangla College
- Bangladesh-Japan Training Institute
- F.M. International School and College
- Kallyanpur Girls' School and College

Other schools in Darus Salam Thana include:

- Darus Salam High School
- Darus Salam Government Secondary School
- Mirpur Siddhanto High School
- Jahanabad Government Primary School
- Mirpur Laboratory School and College
