= Prime University =

Bangladeshi private university

- প্রাইম বিশ্ববিদ্যালয়
- Other name: PU
- Motto: ...a home for rendering prime knowledge
- Type: Private
- Established: 2002; 24 years ago
- Affiliations: University Grants Commission Bangladesh, Ministry of Education, Bangladesh Prime Foundation
- Chairman: Anwar Kamal Pasha
- Chancellor: President Mirza Fakhrul Islam Alamgir
- Vice-Chancellor: Professor Dr Quazi Deen Mohd Khosru
- Academic staff: 220
- Students: 8,000
- Location: Dhaka, Bangladesh; 23.7910°N 90.3482°E
- Campus: Urban 114/116 Mazar Road, Section 1, Mirpur, Dhaka 1216
- Colors: Red and green
- Website: www.primeuniversity.ac.bd

Prime University (Bengali: প্রাইম বিশ্ববিদ্যালয়) or PU is a private university in Mirpur, Dhaka, Bangladesh. The university was established according to the Private University Act of 1992. It is affiliated with the University Grants Commission of Bangladesh. A group of educationists and philanthropists established this institute in 2002. PU is the first venture of the Prime Foundation. The university has ten undergraduate and eight graduate programs offered by the five faculties.

== Campus ==
Prime University is located at 114/116 Mazar Road, Mirpur-1, Dhaka 1216, Bangladesh. It is a 10-story building with an area of 150,000 sq ft (14,000 m^{2}).

== Former vice-chancellors ==
- Professor Dr Quazi Deen Mohd Khosru (present)
- Professor Dr Md. Jahangir Alam
- Professor Dr M. Abdus Sobhan
- Professor Dr Prafulla Chandra Sarker
- Professor Dr Mesbah-Us-Saleheen

== Faculties ==
PU has eight departments in five faculties.

- Faculty of Engineering
- Faculty of Information Technology
- Faculty of Business Studies
- Faculty of Art and Social Science
- Faculty of Law

== Academic programs ==
PU offers the following graduate and undergraduate programs:

=== Bachelor's level ===
- BSc in Computer Science and Engineering (CSE)
- BSc in Electronics and Telecommunication Engineering (ETE)
- BSc in Electrical and Electronics Engineering (EEE)
- BSc in Civil Engineering (CE)
- Bachelor of Business Administration (BBA)
- BA (Hons) in English
- LLB(Hons)
- BA (Hons) in Bangla
- Bachelor of Education (BEd)

=== Master's level ===
- Master of Business Administration Regular and Executive (MBA)
- LLM (Regular)
- LLM (Preli & Final)
- MA in English
- MA in English language Teaching (ELT)
- M.A. in English Literature
- Masters of Education (MEd)

== Laboratories ==
Prime University has built up its laboratories, which are:

- Physics Lab
- Chemistry Lab
- Computer Lab
- Software Engineering Lab
- Microprocessor Lab
- Electronics and Digital Logic Lab
- Electrical Circuit and Measurements Lab
- Energy Conversion and Drives Lab
- Digital Signal Processing Lab
- Microwave Engineering Lab
- Fiber-optic Communication Lab
- GSM Lab

== Innovation hub ==
A platform consisting of university teachers, students, researchers, which have been formed with the overall supervision of Innovation Lab to expand the technology research at the university level.

== Library ==
The Prime University Library has resources like books, reports and bound journals, CD ROMs and databases, audio & video cassettes etc. Presently, there are more than 30,000 books covering liberal arts, social sciences and commerce, particularly business, management, marketing, finance, economics, computer science and engineering, telecommunication engineering, electrical & electronics engineering, history and culture, sociology as well as language courses like English, Arabic, Chinese, Korean etc. The CD ROMs contain contents of books, matters relating to the environment, history, culture, culinary arts, etc. It also has a digital library, a focused collection of digital objects that can include text, images, audio and video.

== Academic semester ==
- Spring (January to June)
- Summer (July to December)

== Research center ==
PU has a research center named Center for Research, Human Resource Development & Publications (CRHP).

== Alumni association ==
The Prime University Alumni Association or PUALUMNI is located on campus.

=== Journals and publications ===
Prime University Journal is an interdisciplinary journal published in January and July of each year and is registered with National Serials Data Program, Library of Congress (ISSN 1995-5332). The journal contains research-based articles on social science, law, education, business, arts, science and technology. The first edition was published in July 2007 by CRHP. It also publishes a newsletter.

== Convocation ==
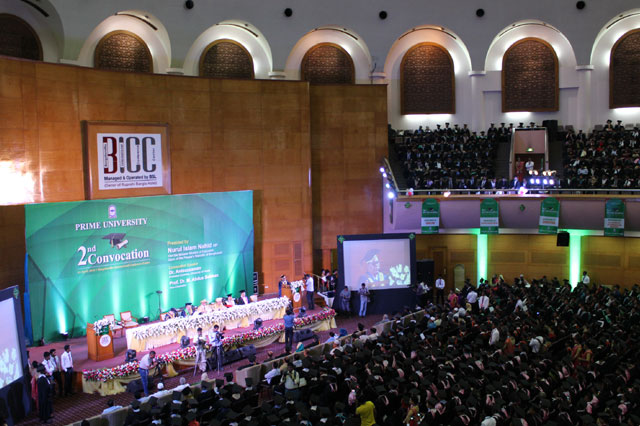
2nd Convocation of Prime University held at BICC

Prime University held its first convocation on 14 October 2008 at Bangabandhu International Conference Center. Almost 3,200 students received their degrees at that ceremony. The second was held on 24 April 2016 at the same place. This time almost 6,000 students received their degrees. The chief guest was Education Minister Nurul Islam Nahid.
