= Shah Nuri Bengali =

18th-century Islamic scholar

Mawlana Shah Nuri Bengali
- শাহ নূরী বাঙ্গালী

Personal life
- Born: Babupura, Jahangir Nagar, Bengal Subah
- Died: 1785 CE Maghbazar
- Resting place: Maghbazar
- Other name: Shah Nuri Bangali

Religious life
- Religion: Islam
- Denomination: Sunni
- School: Hanafi

Muslim leader
- Disciple of: Baghu Dewan
- Arabic name
- Personal (Ism): Shāh Nūrī شاه نوري
- Patronymic (Nasab): ibn ʿAbd Allāh ibn Ghulām Muḥammad بن عبد الله بن غلام محمد
- Toponymic (Nisba): al-Bangālī البنغالي

Shāh Nūrī Bengālī (Bengali: শাহ নূরী বাঙ্গালী, Persian: شاه نوری بنگالی; died 1785) was an 18th-century Bengali Islamic scholar and author from Dhaka. He is best known for his magnum opus, Kibrīt-e-Aḥmar, which was written in the Persian language.

== Early life and education ==
Shah Nuri was born into a Bengali Muslim family from the village of Babupura in Dhaka, the capital of Mughal Bengal. The 20th-century Bangladeshi historian Syed Muhammed Taifoor describes the family to have been "very old and learned citizens of Dhaka". Their ancestor, Shah Bahauddin, arrived from Baghdad. Both Shah Nuri's father, Shaykh Abdullah Mujaddidi and grandfather Mawlana Shaykh Ghulam Muhammad Mujaddidi, were saliks at the Khanqah of Babupura and taught the Islamic sciences at the Babupura madrasa. As his grandfather was a murid (disciple) of the Punjabi scholar Ahmad Sirhindi, they belonged to the Mujaddidiyah suborder of the Naqshbandi Sufi order. Other than his father, among his grandather's renowned disciples were Shaykh Abdullah Jahangirnagari and Shaykh Lutfullah Meherpuri who were teachers at the Lalbagh Mridha Madrasa. His sister, Mariam Saleha, constructed the historic Mariam Saleha Mosque of Babupara in 1706.

He was educated in the city's madrasa, which was founded by Bengal's governor Shaista Khan in Pathartali Katra, four miles away from Maghbazar. After that, he enrolled at the Furqaniyyah Dar al-Ulum Madrasa in Motijhil, Murshidabad, which was founded by Nawazish Muhammad Khan. Shah Nuri then became a murid (disciple) of Baghu Dewan of Binni Bazar, Rajshahi. During his education he studied books such as Mashariq al-Anwar `ala Sahih al-Athar, a book on Hadith by Qadi Iyad, and Sharh Matali`, a book on logic by Qutb ad-Din al-Razi.

== Career ==
In 1775, he wrote a book titled Kibrīt-e-Aḥmar (Red Sulphur) in the Persian language. However, Saghir Hasan al-Masumi argues that it was written in 1763. The book was focused on tasawwuf, but also contained biographies of contemporary Sufis, such as a list of the murids of the Babupura Khanqah.

Nuri returned to Dhaka in 1779, where he set up a new khanqah in Maghbazar. He spent his life disseminating Islamic values to his followers at the khanqah. Many of the Naib Nazims of Dhaka and the later Nawabs of Dhaka were disciples of Shah Nuri and his descendants. In particular, Shah Nuri was the pir and murshid of Naib Nazim Jasarat Khan.

== Death and legacy ==
Nuri died in 1785 and was buried in Maghbazar, Dhaka. The historian Taifoor was of the opinion that he died in 1774, although this is inconsistent with the date of completion of Nuri's book. He had four sons, all of whom died in their childhood except the fourth; Abul Wafa Shah Muhammadi (d. 1835), who succeeded him as the Gaddi nasheen of Maghbazar Khanqah. His sons were buried next to him in a mazar (mausoleum). Khwaja Abdullah of the Nawab family requested to be buried next to Nuri, and is now buried towards his right.

During this period, such books would be copied by hand rather than printing. One manuscript of Nuri's book was hand-written by Sadruddin Ahmad of Mahuttuli. This is now preserved at the Hakim Habibur Rahman Collection of the Dhaka University Library. A girls' school in Dhaka has been named after him as Shahnuri Model Girls High School in Shahshab Bari Road.
