= Mahbub Ullah =

Professor Mahbub Ullah

Mahbub Ullah is a Bangladeshi academic, economist and a National Professor of Bangladesh.

== Early life and education ==
Ullah was born on 10 December 1945 in Noakhali District, East Bengal, British India. He was a student activist in the 1960s. He graduated with a master's degree from the University of Dhaka in 1967. He completed a second master's degree at Boston University in 1980. He completed his PhD at Jawaharlal Nehru University in 1990.

== Career ==
Ullah had joined the University of Chittagong in 1976 as a lecturer of Development Studies. He was the dean of the Faculty of Social Sciences at the University of Chittagong. He was the inaugural pro-vice-chancellor of the National University. He served in that role from 1993 to 1997.

From 2003 to 2006, Ullah was the chairperson of Sonali Bank. From 2005 to 2011, he taught at the University of Dhaka.

In January 2014, Ullah was assaulted outside the Institution of Engineers, Bangladesh where he had attended an event of engineers aligned with the Bangladesh Nationalist Party. He was allegedly attacked by Awami League linked individuals. Former Prime Minister Khaleda Zia demanded a fair investigation from Prime Minister Sheikh Hasina.

Ullah published his autobiography in 2024 titled Amar Jibon, Amar Sangram (My Life, My Struggle). He is the convener of the Bangladesh Economic Association.

In July 2026, Ullah was appointed National Professor by the Government of Bangladesh. He has spoken against bad loans harming the banking sector of Bangladesh. He has called the Awami League the biggest obstacle to democracy in Bangladesh.

== Personal life ==
Ullah was married to Umme Salma Mahbub, a faculty member of the University of Dhaka, founding President of the Pabna District unit of the Bangladesh Nationalist Party, and Member of Parliament.
