= Mirpur Thana =

Thana in Dhaka North City Corporation, Bangladesh

Mirpur Thana মিরপুর থানা
- Thana
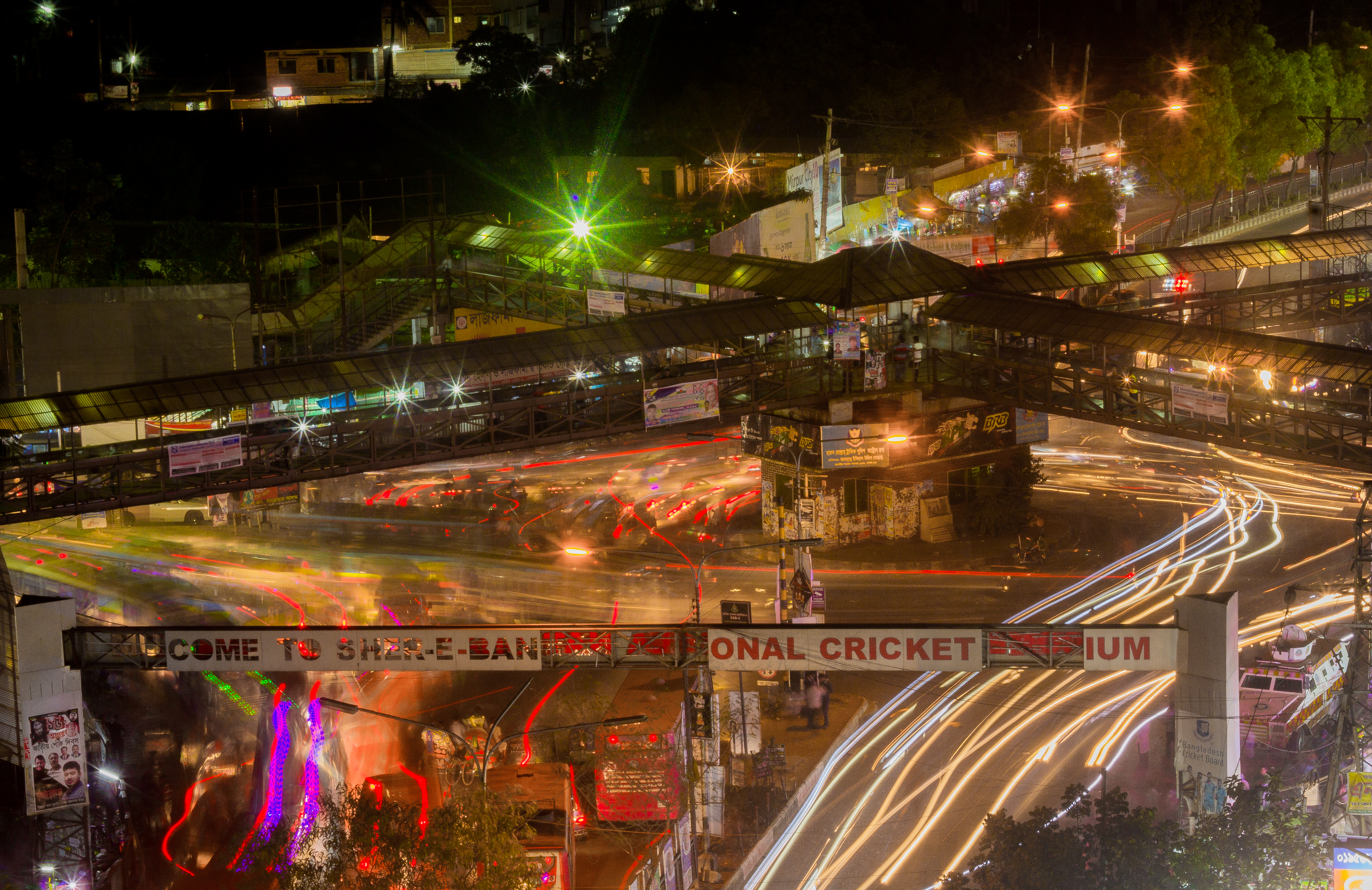
- Mirpur 10 Night view
- Interactive map of Mirpur Thana
- Coordinates: 23.80464°N 90.36305°E
- Country: Bangladesh
- Division: Dhaka Division
- District: Dhaka District
- Established as a thana: 1962

Area
  - Total: 6.42 km^{2} (2.48 sq mi)
- Elevation: 23 m (75 ft)

Population (2022)
  - Total: 546,203
  - Density: 106,236/km^{2} (275,150/sq mi)
- Time zone: UTC+6 (BST)
- Postal code: 1216
- Area code: 02

Mirpur (Bengali: মিরপুর) is a thana of Dhaka city, Bangladesh. It is bounded by Pallabi Thana to the north, Mohammadpur Thana to the south, Kafrul to the east, and Savar Upazila to the west.

== History ==
Shah Ali Baghdadi migrated to medieval Mirpur after flooding in Miran-i-Girdah, where he is credited with spreading Islam. Mirpur Thana was established in 1962. The thana consists of 1 union parishad, 8 wards, and 17 mouzas. Mirpur Thana area was included in Keraniganj Thana during the British period (1757–1947) and in Tejgaon Thana during the Pakistan period (1947–1971). After the Bangladesh Liberation War, following the victory day, Mirpur was liberated on 31 January 1972.

== Geography ==
The thana, with a total area of 6.42 km^{2} (2.48 sq mi), is situated in the northwest of Dhaka city. It is bounded by Shah Ali Thana and Pallabi Thana on the north, Sher-e-Bangla Nagar Thana and Darus Salam Thana on the south, Pallabi Thana and Kafrul Thana on the east and Shah Ali Thana and Darus Salam Thana on the west.

=== Sections ===
Mirpur is divided into multiple sections.

- Mirpur-1
- Mirpur-2
- Mirpur-3
- Mirpur-4
- Mirpur-6
- Mirpur-7
- Mirpur-8
- Mirpur-9
- Mirpur-10
- Section-11
- Section-12
- Section-13
- Section-14
- Section-15

== Demographics ==
Religions in Mirpur Thana (2022)
Religion	Percent
Islam	95.60%
Hinduism	3.13%
Christianity	1.08%
Other or not stated	0.19%

According to the 2022 Bangladeshi census, Mirpur Thana had 144,028 households and a population of 546,212. 7.44% of the population were under 5 years of age. Mirpur had a literacy rate (age 7 and over) of 90.17%: 91.60% for males and 88.51% for females, and a sex ratio of 115.78 males for every 100 females.

According to 2011 census, Mirpur Thana had a population of 500,373 with average household size of 4.3 members, and an average literacy rate of 80.2% vs a national average of 51.8% literacy.

== Education ==
=== Colleges ===
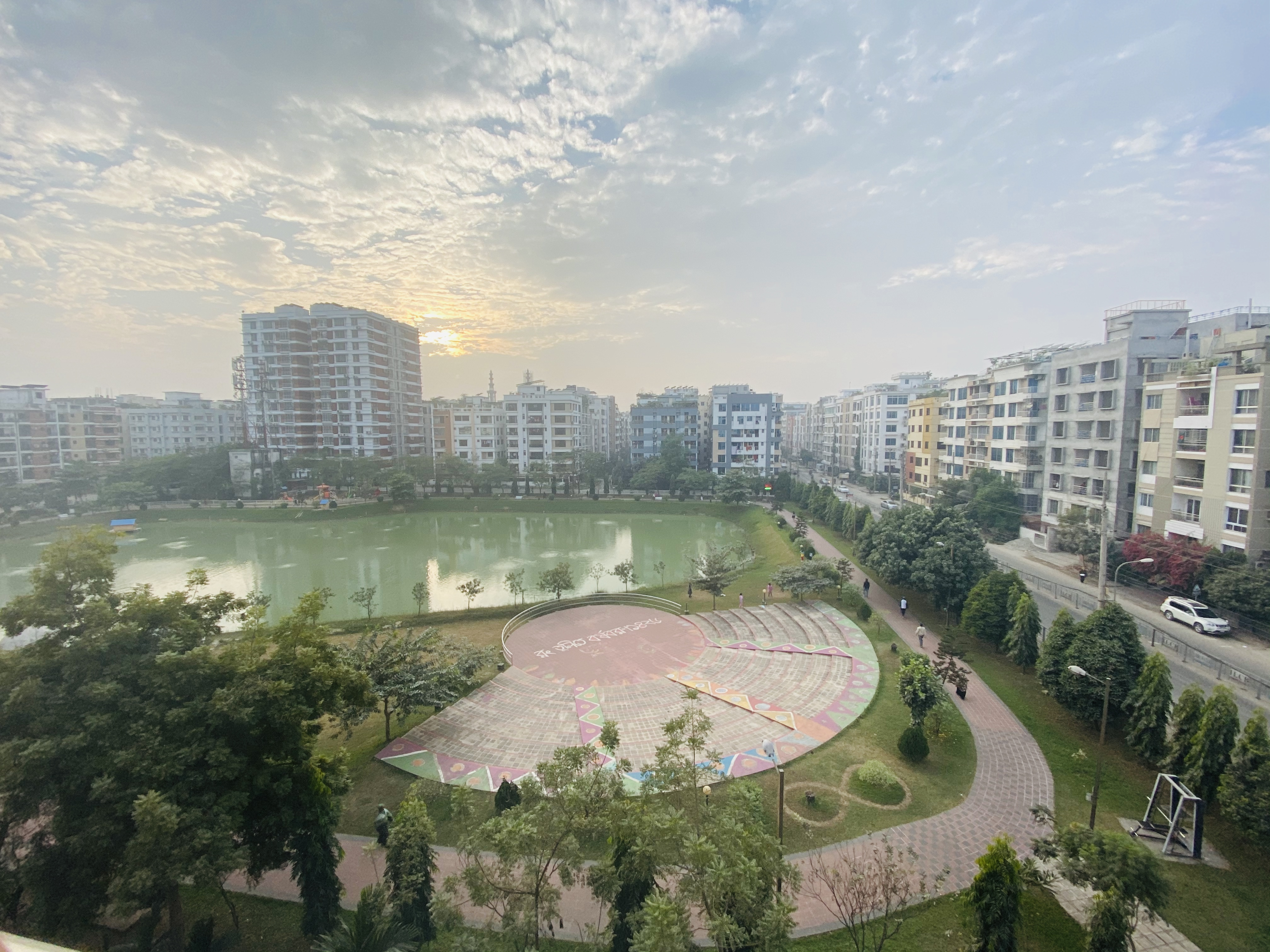
Mirpur DOHS

মিরপুর ক্যান্টনমেন্ট পাবলিক স্কুল ও কলেজ

Noubahini College, Dhaka

- BCIC College
- Dhaka Commerce College
- Government Bangla College
- Monipur High School and College (MUBC)
- SOS Hermann Gmeiner College
- Mirpur Cantonment Public School and College
- Mirpur College
- Shaheed Police Smrity College

=== Universities ===
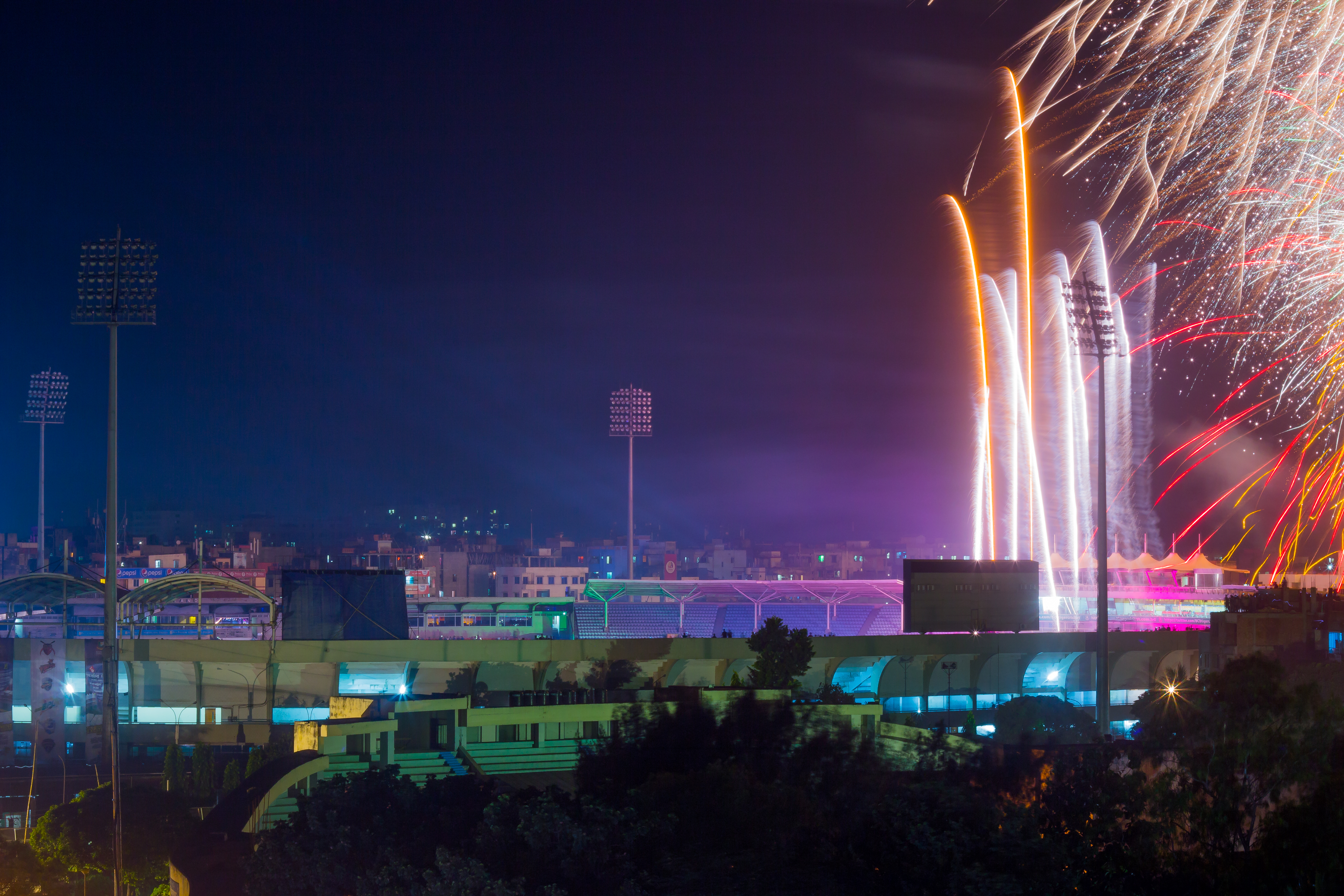
Sher-e-Bangla Cricket stadium

- Bangladesh Maritime University (Temporary Campus)
- Bangladesh University of Business and Technology (BUBT)
- Bangladesh University of Professionals (BUP)
- Green University of Bangladesh
- Military Institute of Science and Technology (MIST)
- Sher-e-Bangla Agricultural University (SAU)
- Prime University

== Incidents ==
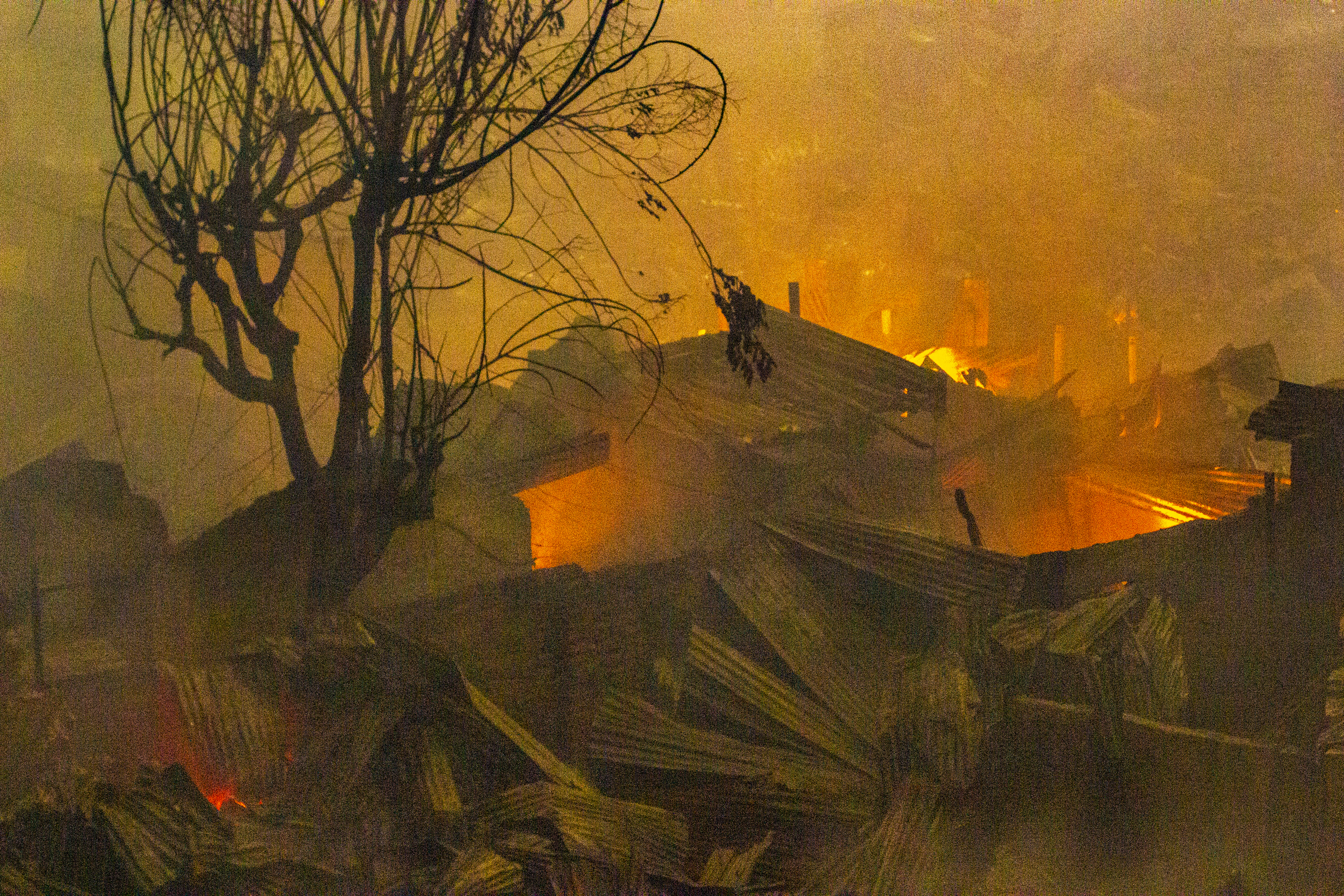
Fire destroys hundreds of shanties in Mirpur slum in Dhaka on August 16, 2019

=== Fires ===
- 5 November 2018 – Chandrabindu Fashion House
- 14 April 2019 – City Park Building
- 3 July 2019 – Mirpur-14, Slum
- 16 August 2019 – Mirpur-7, Cholontika Slum

== Points of interest ==
=== Recreation and Landmarks ===
Landmarks in Mirpur include the Mirpur Beribadh (dyke), Bangladesh National Zoo, National Botanical Garden of Bangladesh, Sony Cinema Hall, Grameen Bank's head office, and Sher-e-Bangla Cricket Stadium. For the Cricket World Cup of 2011, Mirpur's Sher-e-Bangla Cricket Stadium was selected as a venue. For this reason, renovations were carried out within the thana. The opening match was held there on 19 February 2011.

=== Educational Institutions ===
Educational institutions include the Military Institute of Science and Technology and Bangladesh University of Professionals, both located within Mirpur Cantonment, SOS Hermann Gmeiner College, Dhaka Commerce College, Government Bangla College, Monipur High School, Ibn Sina Medical College, BCIC College, and Mirpur Government High School.

== See also ==
- Upazilas of Bangladesh
- Districts of Bangladesh
- Divisions of Bangladesh
- Neighbourhoods in Dhaka Metropolitan Area
- Thanas of Bangladesh
- Union councils of Bangladesh
- List of city corporations in Bangladesh
