= Government Bangla College =

Public college in Dhaka, Bangladesh

Coordinates: 23.7849°N 90.3533°E

- সরকারি বাঙলা কলেজ
- Crest of Government Bangla College
- Latin: Deus, da mihi sapientiam
- Other names: GBC; Bangla College
- Motto: "হে প্রভু আমাকে জ্ঞান দাও"
- Motto in English: O God, give me wisdom
- Type: Public
- Established: 20 June 1962; 64 years ago
- Founder: Abul Kashem
- Parent institution: Dhaka Central University
- Affiliations: Dhaka Education Board
- Chancellor: President of Bangladesh
- Vice-Chancellor: Md. Lutfor Rahaman
- Principal: Professor Md Quamrul Hasan
- Students: 13,176
- Undergraduates: 9,674
- Postgraduates: 1,331
- Other students: 2,171 (HSC)
- Location: Mirpur, Dhaka, 1216, Bangladesh
- Campus: 10 hectares (25 acres); Urban
- Colors: La Salle Green and Blood Red
- Website: sarkaribanglacollege.gov.bd

Government Bangla College (Bengali: সরকারি বাঙলা কলেজ) (Dhaka Central University Attached: Government Bangla College, Dhaka) also known as Bangla College, or abbreviated as GBC is a public college located in the northwestern part of the Bangladesh capital Dhaka. The college was established in 1962 by Principal Abul Kashem to promote Bangla as a medium of instruction in higher education and to establish the language in all spheres of national life.

It was affiliated with the University of Dhaka from February 2017 to January 2025. According to Banbeis data for 2024, a total of 13,176 students are studying here. Currently It Is Attached With Dhaka Central University

== History ==
Soon after the historical Language Movement, in 1956 Bengali was recognized as one of the state languages of Pakistan in the country's first Constitution. Shortly thereafter, Principal Abul Kashem, former professor of University of Dhaka and pioneer of the Bengali Language Movement, realized that Bangla is neglected in every different field in Pakistan. In 1960, in a meeting for Martyrs' Day at Curzon Hall at University of Dhaka, he said "Even before West Pakistan was formed, they had established Urdu Colleges to make Urdu as a State language of Pakistan. The Government of Pakistan has contributed funds and land to Urdu Colleges. Although we have fought so much, the government is still ignoring our plea. If government doesn't respond, we should create a Bangla Medium College in the future."

In 1961, he started discussions with educationists and intellectuals to set up a Bangla college in then East Pakistan, now Bangladesh. The college was established on 1 October 1962.

The college became affiliated with the University of Dhaka in 2017.

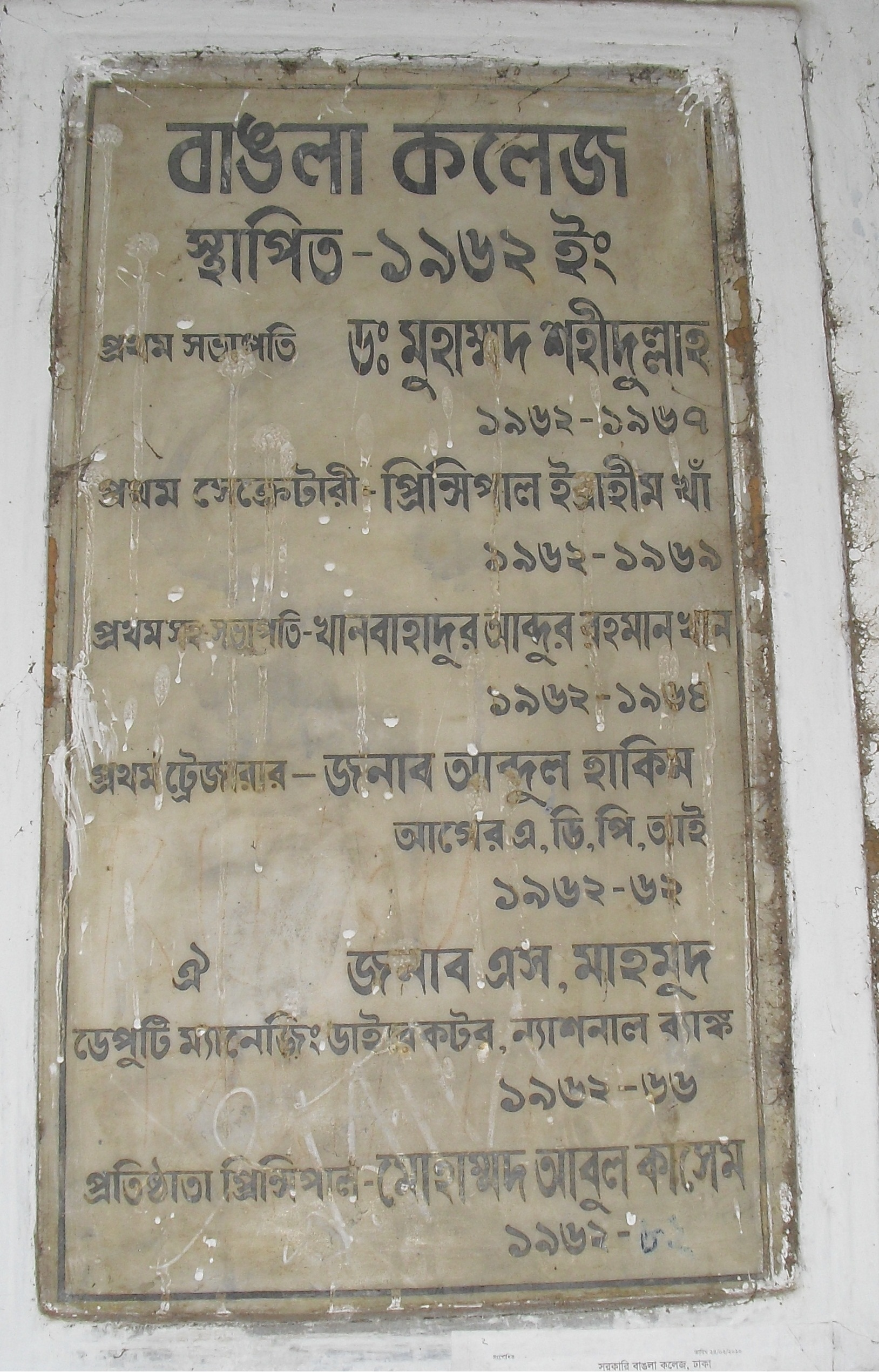

== Academics ==
=== Faculty of Science ===
- Botany
- Zoology
- Physics
- Chemistry
- Mathematics
- Soil Science
- Geography and Environmental Science

=== Faculty of Arts and Social Science ===
- English
- Bangla
- History
- Islamic Studies
- Islamic History and Culture
- Political Science
- Social Work
- Economics
- Philosophy

=== Faculty of Business Studies ===
- Accounting
- Finance & Banking
- Management
- Marketing

== Campus ==
This college has 8 academic buildings.

- Building - 1 (Administrative)
- Building - 2 (Faculty of Arts and Social Sciences)
- Building - 3 (Faculty of Science)
- Building - 4
- Building - 5 (Faculty of Business Studies)
- Building - 6
- Building - 7
- Building - 8

== Facilities ==
=== Library ===
Central library is located in building - 7. With a decorated study room it has a different variety of books. Each department has its library or seminar.

=== Playground ===
There's a wide playground in the college campus where cricket, football and different games are played along with hosting annual games.

=== Transportation ===
There are 3 bus for transportation "Sadhinota, Bijoy & Mukti" which takes students from home to campus, campus to home.

=== Hostel ===
- Principal Abul Kashem Hostel
- Sheikh Kamal Hostel (Ready To Open)
- Bangabandhu Sheikh Mujibur Rahman Hostel (proposed)
- Sheikh Fazilatunnesa Mujib Hostel (proposed)

=== Mosque ===
Government Bangla College Jame Mosque is located inside the college campus for everyone. There are specific rooms for offering prayer for both boys and girls.

== Co-curricular ==
=== Social and cultural Organisations ===
- Bangla College Youth Theatre
- Bangla College Journalists Association
- Bangla College Debating Society
- Bangla College Recitation Society
- Bangla College Literature Society
- Bangla College Film and Photography Society
- Bangla College Badhan Unit
- Clean and Green Campus
- Save The Future Foundation
- Youth Gracious Human

=== Others ===
- Bangla College Business & Career Club
- BNCC (Army, Navy)
- Rover Scout
- Bangla College Ranger Unit (Girls Guide)
- Bangladesh Liberation War Stage
- 71 er Chetona
- Bangla College Fencing Club
- Bangla College Science Club
- Bangla College English Language Club
- Bangla College Quiz Club
- Bangla College Environment Club
- Dainik Adhikar
- Bondhumoncho - বন্ধুমঞ্চ

=== International Organisations ===
- Govt. Bangla College Red Crescent Youth — Govt. Bangla College Red Crescent Team began its activities on this campus on November 29, 2019. For over 6 years, the team has been actively working as an Emergency Response Unit — ERU Currently, the team has more than 300 Red Crescent volunteers who are regularly engaged in providing First Aid, Search & Rescue Operations, Blood collection & supply and other humanitarian services with efficiency and dedication.
- Leo Club Of Govt. Bangla College

== Gallery ==
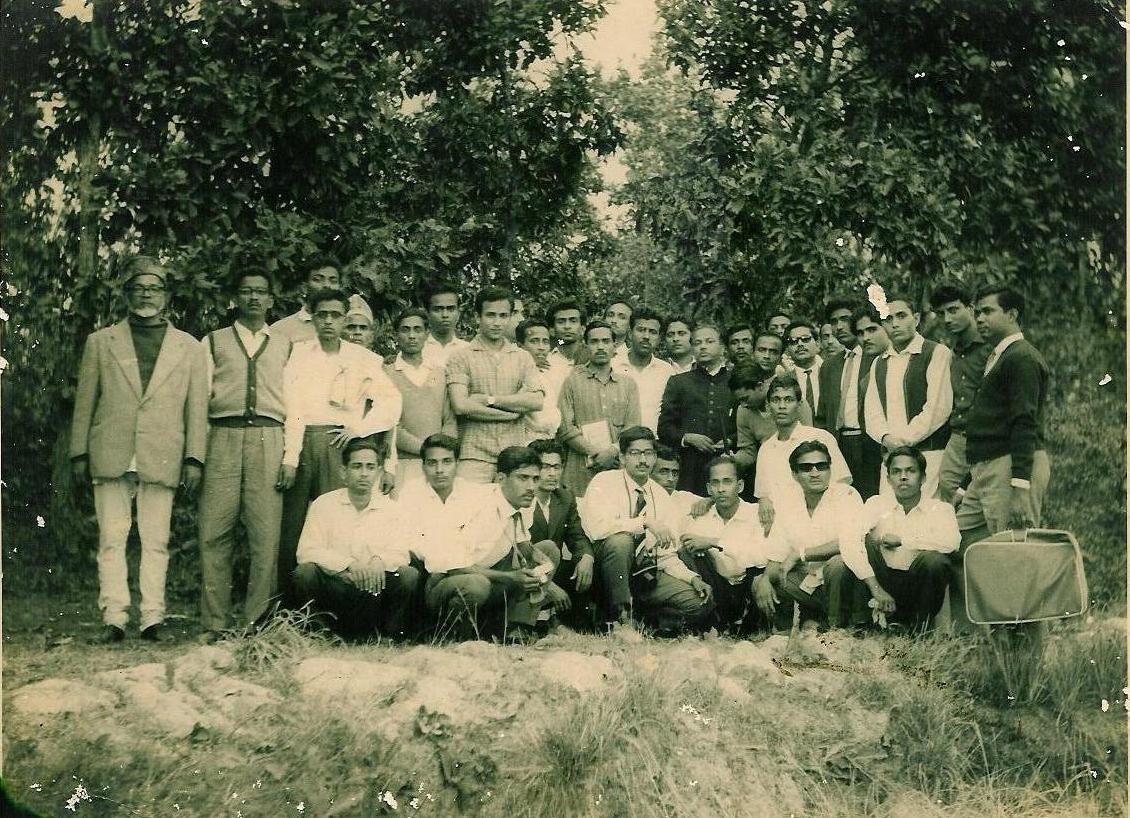
Principal Abul Kashem with first year Bangla College student and Faculty, 1962

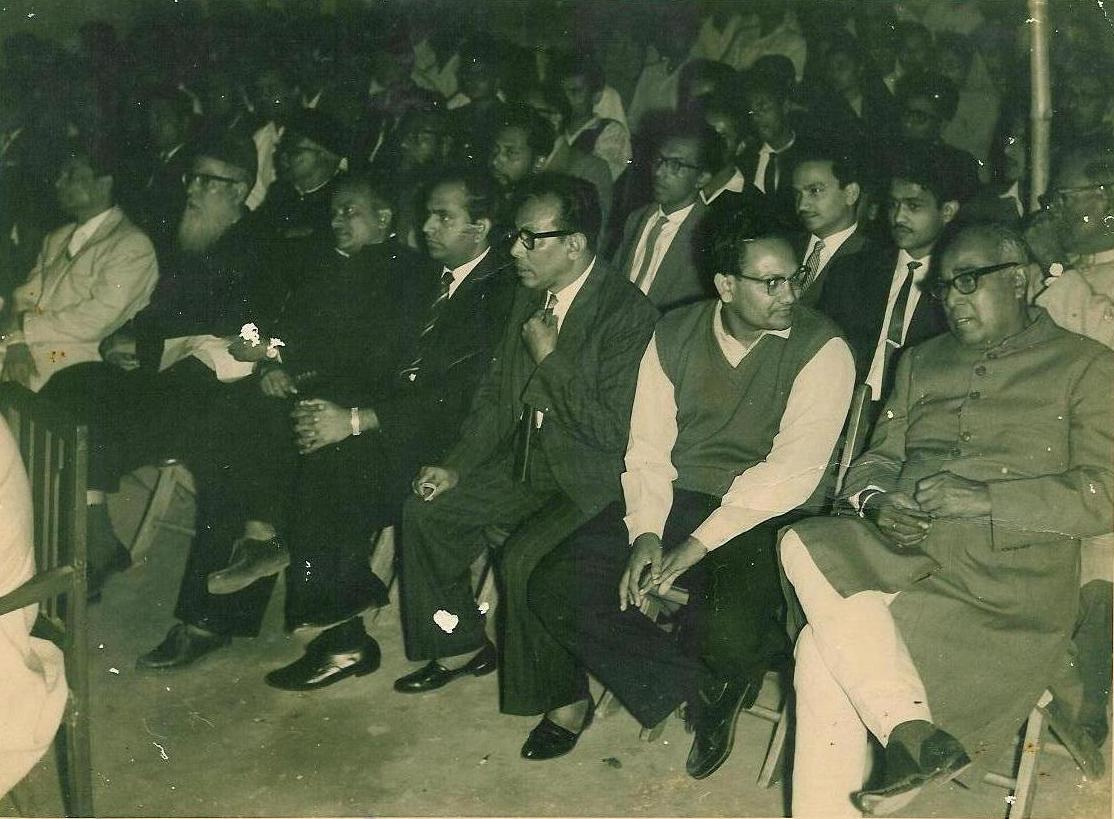
Principal Abul Kashem with first year Bangla College student and Faculty, 1962

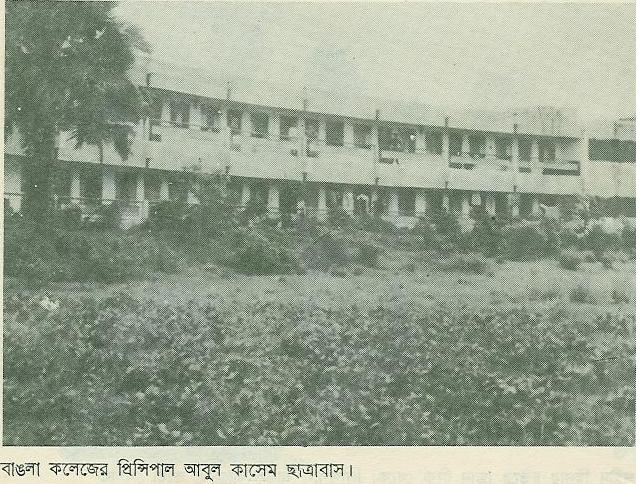
Principal Abul Kashem Chatrabash at Bangla College

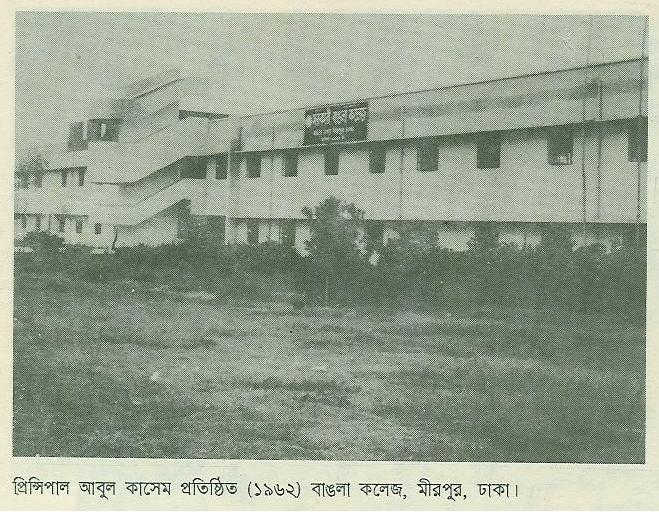
Bangla College

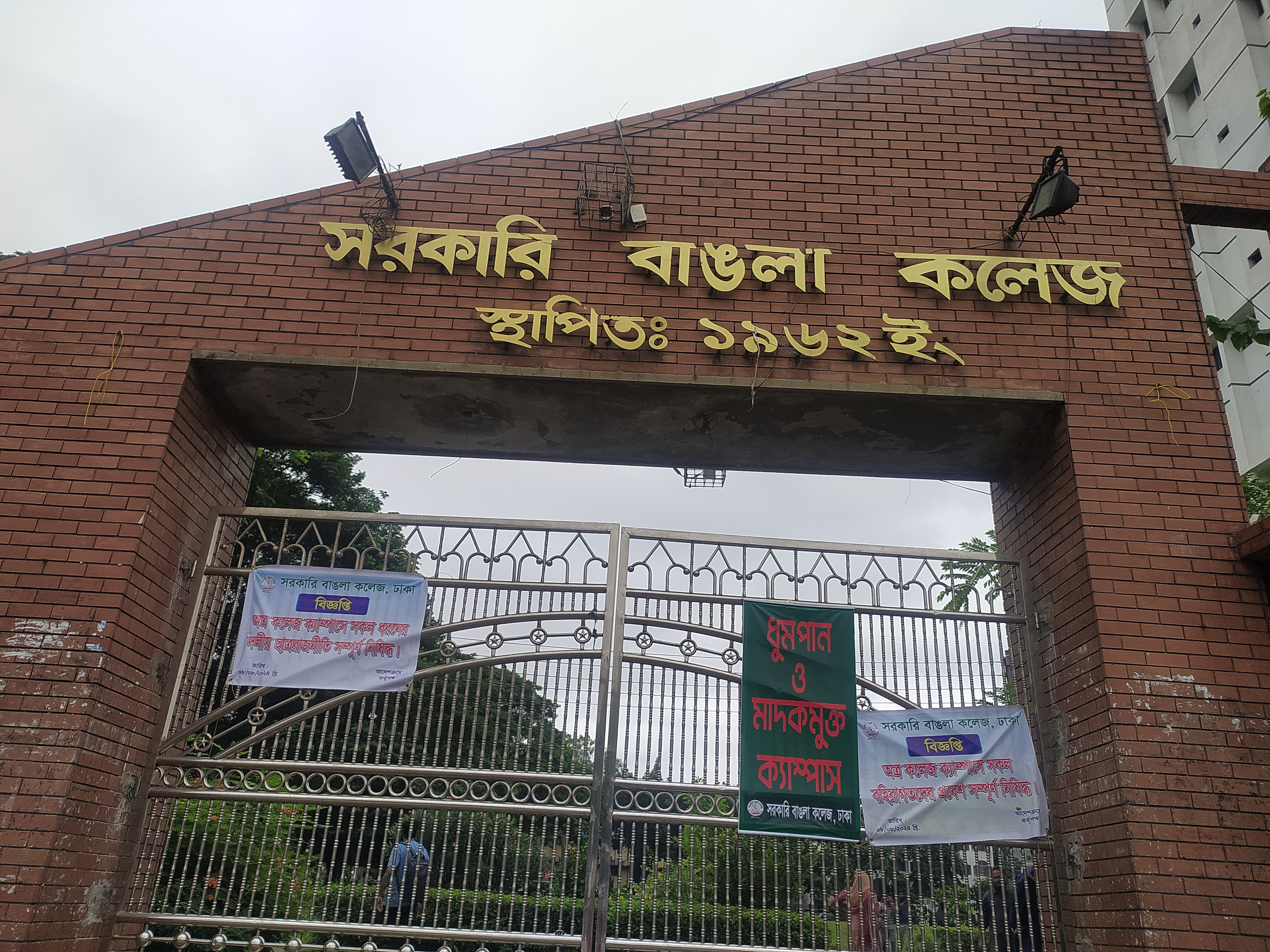
Gate of Govt. Bangla College

== See also ==
- Bangla College Killing Field
- List of colleges under University of Dhaka
