= Eastern Bank (Bangladesh) =

Bank in Bangladesh

Eastern Bank PLC.
- Type: Private (Non-Government)
- Traded as: DSE: EBL; CSE: EBL
- Industry: Banking
- Predecessor: Bank of Credit and Commerce International (Overseas) Limited
- Founded: 8 August 1992; 34 years ago
- Headquarters: Dhaka, Bangladesh
- Key people: Anis Ahmed (Chairman); Hassan O. Rashid ( CEO)
- Products: Banking services
- Operating income: ▲BDT 11,451 million (2023)
- Net income: ▲US$95 million (2019)
- Total assets: ▲US$4 billion (2019)
- Number of employees: 4,428
- Rating: Long-term foreign currency deposit rating of B1 (Moody's)
- Website: ebl.com.bd

Eastern Bank PLC. (Bengali: ইস্টার্ন ব্যাংক পিএলসি) is a private commercial bank headquartered in Dhaka, Bangladesh. It was established on 8 August 1992, as a public limited company with limited liability under the Bank Companies Act of 1991. Its share are listed in the Dhaka Stock Exchange and the Chittagong Stock Exchange. The bank provides products and services in retail banking, corporate finance, asset management, equity brokerage and security. It has 87 branches and 214 ATMs in Bangladesh and employs around 3000 employees.

Presently, EBL has a subsidiary in Hong Kong named EBL Finance (HK) Limited and a representative office in Myanmar. EBL opened its third representative office in mainland China in Guangzhou.

== History ==
Eastern Bank PLC. began operations on 16 August 1992. Prior to 1992, EBL operated as Bank of Credit and Commerce International (BCCI), which transformed into Eastern Bank PLC.

In February 2017, Eastern Bank PLC. announced compensations for clients whose card information was stolen from the bank's ATM after Bangladesh Bank ordered it compensate the clients. City Bank and United Commercial Bank were also targeted in the hacks.

A security guard at an ATM of Eastern Bank PLC. in Dhaka Cantonment was killed on duty in May 2018.

A. M. Shaukat Ali, Director of Eastern Bank and chairman of Chairman of Engineering Consultants and Associates Limited, died in August 2020. Eastern Bank increased its invest in government securities by 63 per cent.

In January 2022, Eastern Bank announced plans to issue five billion BDT worth of bonds. Ali Reza Iftekhar was reappointed managing director of Eastern Bank in June. Bangladesh Bank fined Eastern Bank PLC. 500 thousand BDT for violating single borrower exposure limit with its loans to EBL Securities Limited and EBL Finance (Hong Kong) Limited. Eastern Bank PLC. announced plans to raise 1.2 billion BDT for Thengamara Mohila Sabuj Sangha. It received a Sustainability Rating award for the year 2021 from Bangladesh Bank. It helped arrange a 1.2 billion syndicated loan for Banglalink.

In January 2023, Eastern Bank's branch in Halishahar, Chittagong caught fire which was bought under control by the Bangladesh Fire Service and Civil Defense.

== Subsidiaries ==
- EBL Securities Limited (stock dealing & brokerage)
- EBL Investments Limited (merchant banking operations)
- EBL Asset Management Limited (asset management)
- EBL Finance (HK) Limited (first foreign subsidiary doing trade finance and off-shore banking business in Hong Kong)
- Yangon Representative Office, Myanmar
- Guangzhou Representative Office, mainland China

== Board of directors ==
- Anis Ahmed (chairman)
- M. Ghaziul Haque
- Mir Nasir Hossain
- Salina Ali
- Md. Showkat Ali Chowdhury
- Mufakkharul Islam Khasru
- Ormaan Rafay Nizam (not at present)
- Gazi Md. Shawkat Hossain
- K. J. S. Banu
- Zara Namreen
- Toufic Ahmad Choudhury
- Ashiq Imran
- Ruslan Nasir
- K M Tanjib-ul Alam
- Hassan O. Rashid (Chief Executive Officer)

== Shareholding pattern ==
As of September 30, 2019:

Party	Percentage
Institute	44.20%
Sponsor/Director	31.60%
Public	23.80%
Foreign	00.40%
Government	00.00%

== See also ==
- List of Banks in Bangladesh
