= SOS Hermann Gmeiner College =

Coordinates: 23.8050°N 90.3774°E

- এসওএস হারম্যান মেইনার কলেজ
- Mirpur-13; Dhaka, 1216; Bangladesh

Information
- Type: Educational institution
- Established: 19 January 1986
- Founder: Hermann Gmeiner
- School board: Board of Intermediate and Secondary Education, Dhaka
- Principal: Rafia Akhter
- Grades: Play group- 12th Grade
- Gender: Co-educational
- Age range: 4-18
- Enrollment: 1100
- Language: Bengali
- Hours in school day: 6 Hours
- Campus size: 2 acres (8,100 m^{2})
- Campus type: Urban
- Houses: Two (Hawks & Eagles)
- Colors: White and Maroon
- Sports: Football, cricket, basketball, volleyball, table tennis, badminton, handball
- Nickname: HGC
- Publication: Annual magazine "Satadal"

SOS Hermann Gmeiner College Dhaka is an educational institution located in Mirpur-13 of the capital Dhaka city of Bangladesh. It was established in 1986 by the SOS-Kinderdorf International, a non-government organization headquartered in Innsbruck, Austria. The foundation stone was laid by former President of Bangladesh, Hussain Muhammad Ershad. In 2010, the college was ranked among the top ten institutions of the country for its academic performance in Secondary School Certificate Examination.

Primarily established to educate the children residing in the SOS Children Village of Dhaka, the school now takes students from all social backgrounds in grades from preparatory to twelfth grade aged from 4 to 18. The Bangladesh chapter of SOS-Kinderdorf International SOS Children's Village International in Bangladesh headed by a National Director is the administrative body of the institution with the Principal serving as the head of the institution. The school has approximately 1,200 students enrolled.

== History ==
=== Background ===
Bangladesh emerged as a sovereign country on 26 March 1971 and won its freedom from Pakistan on 16 December of the same year. Due to the nine-month-long war in 1971, Bangladesh slipped into a humanitarian crisis that was beyond description. During the critical time of the nation, the Austrian philanthropist Dr. Hermann Gmeiner came forward with his hands of assistance in 1972.

Professor Hermann made a proposal to Bangabandhu Sheikh Mujibur Rahman to establish a Children village for the orphans of the newly independent nation. Bangabandhu agreed to the proposal that paved the way for the establishment of the Children's village and subsequently the college.

On behalf of the government of Bangladesh, the then Ministry of Labour and Social Welfare signed an agreement with the organization on 17 May 1972, to start SOS Children's Village activities in Bangladesh.

=== Establishment ===
The plan to build up a college was primarily with the objective to provide education to the orphans of the village along with the deprived section of the society. Two acres of land was selected for the college.

The college which is a two-story vaulted brick structure includes 20 classrooms, three laboratories, a multi-purpose hall, a gymnasium, a library, and dining facilities. The college was designed by Nahas Ahmed Khalil and Raziul Ahsan. With a playground and a basketball ground the school is known for its architectural beauty. The academic program officially started on 19 January 1986.

== Academic programme ==
SOS Hermann Gmeiner College offers education for students from preparatory to twelfth grade. There are two sections in every class, not typically named with letters or number, rather with names of flowers, planets or animals.

The college was ranked ninth among all the institutions in 2010 on the result of SSC examinations. In HSC it was ranked the 15th among all the colleges of the country.

== Extra-curricular activities ==
Students of the institution are encouraged to join science-based Olympiads, general knowledge competitions, debating, singing, dancing and other sporting activities.

SOS Hermann Gmeiner College founded Hermann Gmeiner Science Club and Hermann Gmeiner Debating Club in 2004 to facilitate science-based activities and flourish the concept of debating in the arena. In addition, mathematics club, language club and cultural club were established in 2009 to engage the students with such activities.

Hermann Gmeiner Science Club is among the prominent science clubs of the country with their excellence in national level general knowledge competitions and Olympiads.

The institution got one of the best spellers of the country who was ranked among the top twenty spellers of Bangladesh. Students from the organization have shown their excellence in national level cultural competitions as well as regional.

== Uniform ==
All students have to wear the prescribed college uniform for summer (April–September) and winter (October–March). There is a special dress for sports day (once a week).

The uniforms consist the following:

Season/gender	Summer	Winter	Sports day
Boys	White half sleeve shirt, ash grey trouser, black leather belt, black shoes.	White full sleeve shirt, maroon trouser, black leather belt, black shoes, maroon necktie.	White half sleeve shirt, white trouser, black leather belt, white keds.
Girls	Ash grey frock, white pajama, white orna, black shoes.	Maroon frock, white pajama & white orna, black shoes.	White frock, white pajama & white orna, white keds.

== House ==
The institution has two houses: Hawks and Eagles. Each year, after the annual sports competition, the most achiever house is declared the best of the year.
