= Abul Barkat (economist) =

Bangladeshi economist

- আবুল বারকাত
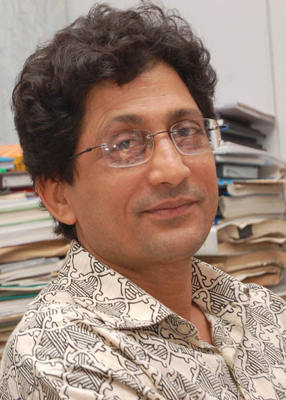
- Barkat in 2007
- Born: September 27, 1954 (age 72); Kushtia District, East Bengal, Dominion of Pakistan
- Education: Moscow Institute of National Economy, now Plekhanov Russian University of Economics (PhD)
- Occupations: Researcher, economist, professor

Abul Barkat (born September 27, 1954) is a Bangladeshi economist and a retired professor in the Department of Economics, University of Dhaka. In addition to his teaching, from 2009 to 2014 he was the former chairman of Janata Bank. He is the present elected president of the Bangladesh Economic Association. He is a freedom fighter.

== Early life and education ==
Barkat was born on September 27, 1954, in Kushtia District to his parents Abul Quasem and Mst Nurun Nahar. Abul Barkat is the third child of his parents. His wife is Shahida Akhter. They have three daughters. Abul Barkat passed SSC exam from Kushtia Zilla School in 1970 and HSC from Kushtia Government College in 1973, both with first division with distinction. Abul Barkat graduated from Moscow Institute of National Economy, now Plekhanov Russian University of Economics in 1978 obtaining highest grades in all courses with honors first class and then completed a PhD from the same institute, in development economics in 1982.

== Career ==
In 1982, Barkat started his professional career by joining the Department of Economics in University of Dhaka. He is the immediate past chairman of the same department. He was the Chairman of Janata Bank Limited from 2009 to 2014. After his appointment he refused a company car, and special lifts and chairs for himself.

During Barkat's chairmanship at Janata Bank, about Tk. 5,504 crore loan or 25 percent of bank's capital base, was provided to AnonTex Group, owned by Md Younus Badal. He criticized Abul Maal Abdul Muhith, Minister of Finance, for questioning the governance of Janata Bank and denying an extension to his chairmanship. Barkat said Muhith was not loyal to either Awami League or Sheikh Mujibur Rahman and had undue favors from the CSR fund. He called Muhith a "retard" two years later.

Barkat was elected president of the Bangladesh Economic Association at the end of 2017. He received the Order of the Rising Sun, Gold Rays with Neck Ribbon in 2022.

On 11 July 2025, Barkat was detained in connection with a graft case filed by the Anti-Corruption Commission.

== Personal life ==
Barkat was married to Sahida Akhtar, a medical doctor, who died on 6 May 2021.
