= Northern International Medical College =

Coordinates: 23.7441°N 90.3721°E

- Established: 2005
- Affiliations: University of Dhaka
- Officer in charge: Md. Safikul Islam
- Chairman: A Y M Abdullah
- Principal: Md. Sk. Shahid Ullah
- Students: 450
- Location: House# 84, Road# 8/A (new), Dhanmondi, Dhaka-1209, Bangladesh
- Website: hospital.nimch.com.bd

Northern International Medical College is a medical school in Dhaka, Bangladesh, affiliated with University of Dhaka and approved by Bangladesh Medical and Dental Council (BMDC). It was established in 2005.
