= Maghbazar =

Neighbourhood in Dhaka, Bangladesh

Maghbazar মগবাজার
- Neighbourhood
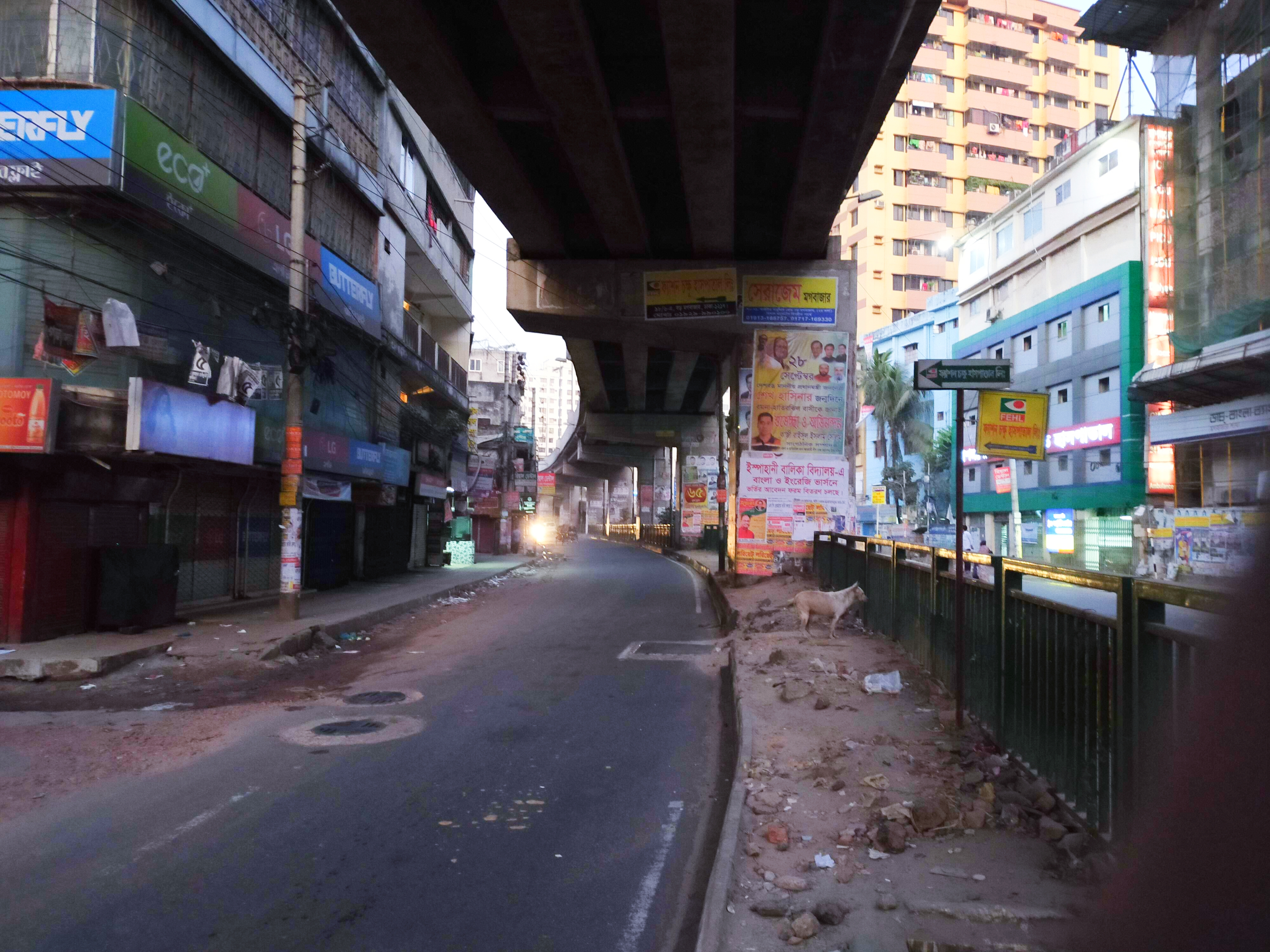
- Maghbazar Wireless Square
- Interactive map of Maghbazar
- Coordinates: 23°44′55″N 90°24′28″E
- Country: Bangladesh
- Division: Dhaka Division
- District: Dhaka District
- City: Dhaka
- Thana: Ramna (DSCC) and Hatirjheel (DNCC)
- Time zone: UTC+6

Maghbazar (Bengali: মগবাজার) or Mogbazar is a neighbourhood in Dhaka, Bangladesh. It is located near the neighbourhoods of Tejgaon, Segunbagicha, Ramna and Malibagh, under the jurisdiction of Ramna and Hatirjheel thanas. Its origins date back to the Mughal Empire.

The area is administered under Dhaka North City Corporation wards 35 and 36.

== Etymology ==
Maghbazar is named after the Magh people or Mogs, whose ancestors were originally from Arakan, Burma.

== History ==
In 1620, the Magh kingdom was attacked by the Mughals at ancient Dhaka, the heart of Bengal. The Mughal subedar Ibrahim Khan, under the Mughals gained victory over the Maghs. Their leader Mukut Ray surrendered to subehdar Islam Khan, and along with his followers, accepted Islam, after which the subedar permitted them to stay in the area of what is now known as Maghbazar. The Maghs possibly also established a settlement here after being defeated at the hands of the Mughals at the end of the 17th century. Historian Muntassir Mamoon holds the view that it was named during the British rule when the then Magh leader King Bring and his followers took refuge here. The area was covered with dense forests even until the middle of the 19th century.

Shah Nuri Bengali established a khanqah in Maghbazar in the late 18th century. This attracted people from all over to Maghbazar,

including the Naib Nazims and Nawabs of Dhaka who became disciples of Shah Nuri, and his spiritual successors.

== List of educational institutions ==
- Ispahani Girls School and College
- Sacred Heart Tutorial School
- Dhaka Community Medical College and Hospital
- Holy Family Medical College
- Ad-din Women's Medical College
- Dr. Sirajul Islam Medical College
- University Dental College
- National Bank Public School and College
- National College of Law
- Nazrul Shikkhaloy
- Maghbazar Girls' School
- Siddheshwari University College
- Sher-e-Bangla High School
- Shahnuri High School
- Lions Model School
- Maghbazar Primary Government School
- St. Mary's International School
- Nayatola Government Primary School
- BTCL Ideal School and College
