= Ad-din Women's Medical College =

Private medical college in Bangladesh

- আদ-দ্বীন মহিলা মেডিকেল কলেজ
- Type: Private medical school
- Established: 2008
- Academic affiliations: University of Dhaka
- Chairman: Rafique Ul Huq
- Principal: Ashraf-uz-Zaman
- Location: Moghbazar, Dhaka, Bangladesh; 23.7485°N 90.4052°E
- Campus: Urban
- Language: English
- Website: awmc.addinmedical.org

Ad-din Women's Medical College (AWMC) (Bengali: আদ-দ্বীন মহিলা মেডিকেল কলেজ) is a private medical college in Bangladesh, exclusively for female students, established in 2008. It is located in Maghbazar, Dhaka. It is affiliated with Dhaka University as a constituent college.

It offers a five-year course of study leading to a Bachelor of Medicine, Bachelor of Surgery (MBBS) degree. A one-year internship after graduation is compulsory for all graduates. The degree is recognized by the Bangladesh Medical and Dental Council (BMDC).

== History ==
Ad-din Foundation, a non-governmental organization dedicated to serving the disadvantaged, established Ad-din Women's Medical College in 2008. It is the first of four medical colleges the organization operates in Bangladesh.

The hospital came under scrutiny following the death of six newborns in 2026. Regulatory body DGHS raised concerns over hospital management and poor ventilation. The hospital authority stated that, two infants were brought dead to the NICU from the post-operative room, while the remaining four died during treatment. DGHS submitted the investigation report on 4 June, 2026 and action on the report was to be taken in next working day.

== Campus ==
The college is located in Maghbazar, Dhaka, within the premises of the 500-bed Ad-din Medical College Hospital. Over 90% of the hospital patients are women or children, although it treats people of all genders and ages.

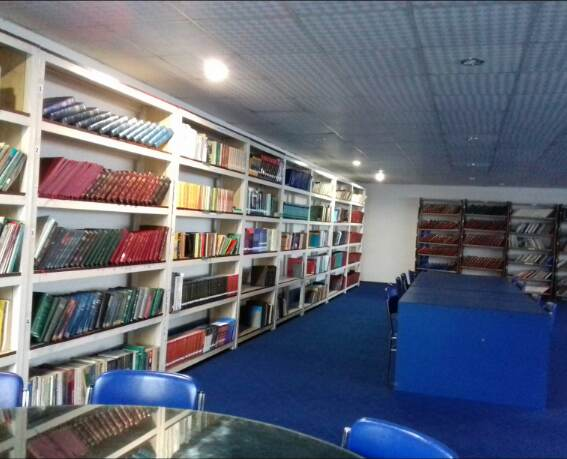
Ad-din Women's Medical College library

== Organization and administration ==
The college is affiliated with Dhaka University as a constituent college. The chairman is Rafique-ul Huq. The principal is Ashraf-uz-Zaman.

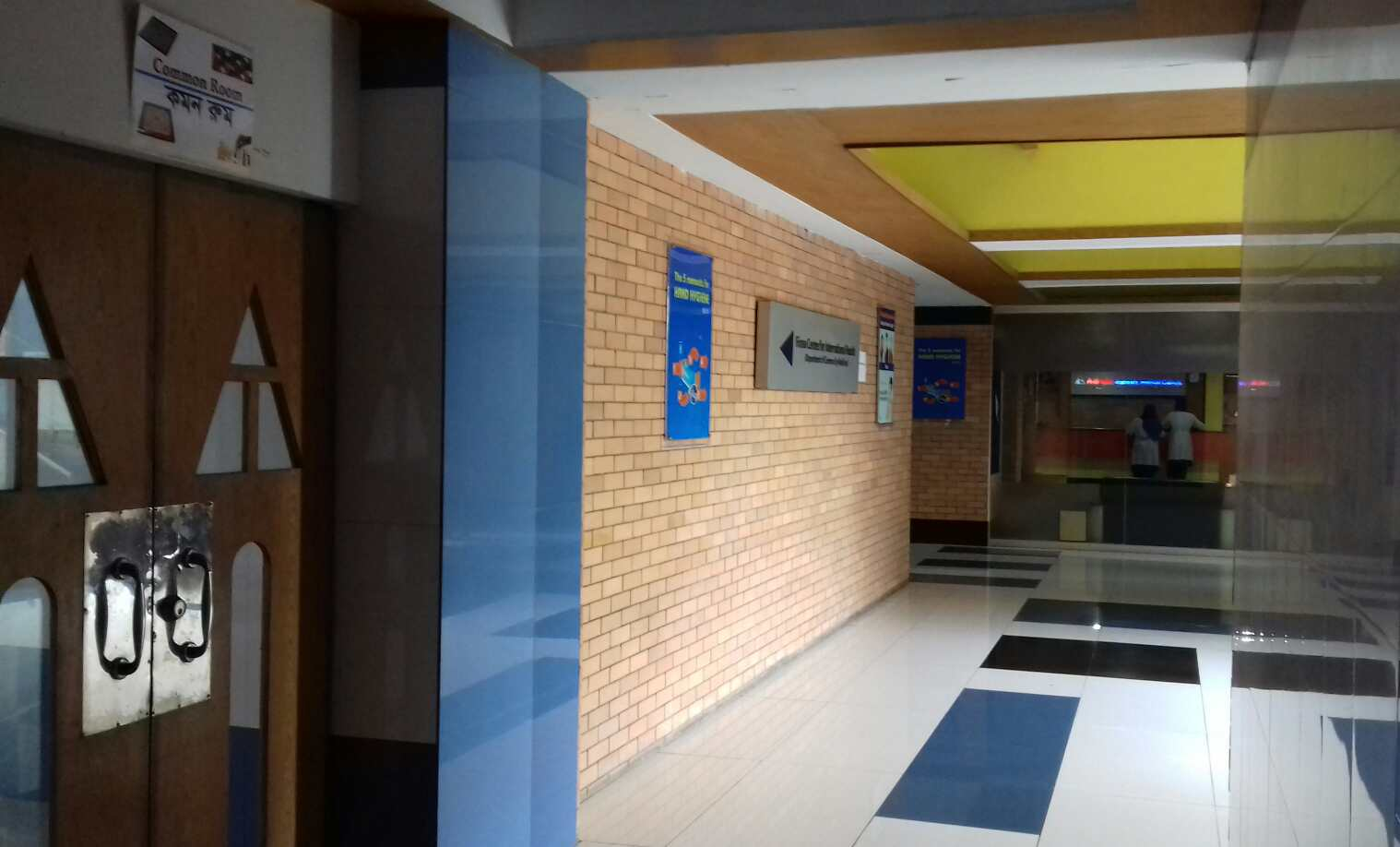
Office of Ad-din Women's Medical College

== Academics ==
The college offers a five-year course of study, approved by the Bangladesh Medical and Dental Council (BMDC), leading to a Bachelor of Medicine, Bachelor of Surgery (MBBS) degree from Dhaka University. After passing the final professional examination, there is a compulsory one-year internship. The internship is a prerequisite for obtaining registration from the BMDC to practice medicine. In October 2014, the Ministry of Health and Family Welfare capped admission and tuition fees at private medical colleges at 1,990,000 Bangladeshi taka (US$25,750 as of 2014) total for their five-year courses.

The college admits only female students. Admission for Bangladeshis to the MBBS programmes at all medical colleges in Bangladesh (government and private) is conducted centrally by the Directorate General of Health Services (DGHS). It administers a written multiple-choice question exam simultaneously throughout the country. Candidates are admitted based primarily on their score on this test, although grades at Secondary School Certificate (SSC) and Higher Secondary School Certificate (HSC) level also play a part. The college also maintains a special quota for applicants from certain backgrounds. Seats are reserved for daughters of Freedom Fighters, and 5% of seats are reserved for students from underprivileged backgrounds. As of July 2014, the college is allowed to admit 75 students annually.
