= Ad-din Momin Medical College =

- আদ-দ্বীন মোমিন মেডিকেল কলেজ
- Ad-din Momin Medical College
- Other name: AdMMC
- Former name: Bashundhara Ad-din Medical College
- Type: Private Medical College & Hospital
- Established: 2013; 13 years ago
- Academic affiliations: University of Dhaka
- Principal: Prof. Dr. Md. Golam Rahman (Dulal)
- Director of Hospital: Prof. Dr. Md. Ruhul Amin
- Location: Doleshwar, Konda, Keraniganj, Bangladesh; 23.6746°N 90.4350°E
- Campus: Urban, 4.44 acres (1.80 ha)
- Language: English
- Website: bamc.addinmedical.org; bamch.addinhospital.org

Ad-din Momin Medical College (AdMMC) is a private medical college in South Keraniganj, Dhaka, Bangladesh. The college is affiliated with the University of Dhaka and is recognized by the Bangladesh Medical and Dental Council (BMDC). It is operated by Ad-din Foundation.

The college received approval from the Ministry of Health and Family Welfare of the Government of Bangladesh on 2 October 2013 and subsequently obtained affiliation with the University of Dhaka on 17 December 2014. The Bangladesh Medical and Dental Council granted recognition on 20 September 2018.

Ad-din Momin Medical College offers a five-year Bachelor of Medicine, Bachelor of Surgery (MBBS) programme followed by a compulsory one-year internship. The college has an annual enrollment capacity of 50 students according to the Directorate General of Medical Education (DGME).

== History ==
Ad-din Momin Medical College was established under the management of Ad-din Foundation, a Bangladeshi non-governmental organization involved in healthcare and social development. The college received approval from the Ministry of Health and Family Welfare of the Government of Bangladesh on 2 October 2013.

The college subsequently obtained affiliation with the University of Dhaka on 17 December 2014. Academic activities began in 2014. The Bachelor of Medicine and Bachelor of Surgery (MBBS) programme is conducted under the academic framework of the University of Dhaka.

The Bangladesh Medical and Dental Council granted recognition to the college on 20 September 2018.

Ad-din Momin Medical College is currently located in Doleshwar, Konda, South Keraniganj, Dhaka, Bangladesh. The college was previously located at 556/A, Bashundhara Riverview Project, South Keraniganj area of Dhaka District.

== Campus ==
According to information recorded by the Directorate General of Medical Education, the college campus is situated on its own land and has an area of approximately 4.44 acres.

The college campus includes academic and student facilities, including teaching facilities and accommodation. The college's official website lists a library, laboratories, hostel accommodation, cafeteria and other student facilities.

== Academics ==
=== MBBS programme ===
Ad-din Momin Medical College offers a five-year Bachelor of Medicine, Bachelor of Surgery (MBBS) programme affiliated with the University of Dhaka. The programme follows the undergraduate medical education curriculum applicable in Bangladesh.

The MBBS course is organized into four academic phases corresponding to the professional examinations. According to the college, the first professional phase extends for 18 months, the second for 12 months, the third for 12 months, and the final professional phase for 18 months.

Following successful completion of the final professional MBBS examination, graduates are required to undergo a compulsory one-year internship as prescribed by the Bangladesh Medical and Dental Council. The internship is a prerequisite for obtaining regular registration with the council.

=== Admission ===
The college admits students to the MBBS programme in accordance with the admission regulations of the Government of Bangladesh and the requirements of the relevant medical education authorities. The current enrollment capacity listed by the Directorate General of Medical Education is 50 students.

== Teaching hospital ==
Ad-din Momin Medical College is associated with a teaching hospital that provides clinical training for students of the MBBS programme. According to the Directorate General of Medical Education, the hospital has a capacity of 300 beds.

The teaching hospital provides clinical services in a range of medical and surgical specialties. The college's current departmental listing includes medicine, surgery, obstetrics and gynaecology, paediatrics, orthopaedics, ophthalmology, otorhinolaryngology, cardiology, endocrinology, gastroenterology, nephrology, neurology, urology and other specialties.

The Directorate General of Medical Education records the college and hospital as separate campus locations, while the hospital serves as the clinical training facility associated with the medical college.

== Departments ==
The college has departments covering the basic medical sciences, para-clinical subjects and clinical disciplines required for the MBBS programme. The departments listed by the college include Anatomy, Biochemistry, Physiology, Pharmacology, Forensic Medicine, Community Medicine, Pathology, Microbiology, Medicine, Surgery, Obstetrics and Gynaecology, Paediatrics, Orthopaedics, Ophthalmology, Otorhinolaryngology, Anaesthesiology, Psychiatry, Radiology and other clinical specialties.

The college's clinical departments and associated hospital services also include cardiology, endocrinology, gastroenterology, nephrology, neurosurgery, pulmonology, urology and other specialties.

== Facilities ==
The college provides academic and student facilities supporting undergraduate medical education. These include teaching laboratories, a library, student accommodation, a cafeteria and facilities for extracurricular activities.

=== Laboratories ===
The college has teaching laboratories for the basic and para-clinical medical sciences. Its listed laboratory facilities include Anatomy, Physiology, Biochemistry, Pharmacology, Pathology, Microbiology, Community Medicine and Forensic Medicine. The college also lists an anatomy dissection hall, museums, a serology and immunology laboratory, and a histopathology and cytology laboratory.

=== Library ===
The college library is located in the college building and supports the academic activities of students and teachers. According to the college, the library occupies approximately 3,000 square feet and contains more than 2,500 textbooks, reference books and monographs, in addition to national and international medical journals. Its reading room has seating capacity for up to 70 students and the library provides internet and computer facilities.

=== Student accommodation ===
The college provides separate accommodation facilities for male and female students. The Directorate General of Medical Education records accommodation capacity for 120 male students and 180 female students.

== Student life ==
The college provides opportunities for extracurricular activities alongside academic studies. The college website lists extracurricular activities, indoor games and student support facilities among its student services.

The college also provides student counselling and organizes activities through student clubs and societies.

== Medical education ==
The college has a Medical Education Unit responsible for supporting teaching and learning activities in the institution. The college also conducts integrated teaching as part of its undergraduate medical education programme.

The MBBS curriculum is organized into four phases covering the basic sciences, para-clinical subjects and clinical disciplines. The college publishes the Bangladesh Medical and Dental Council curriculum and related operational manuals for the different phases of the MBBS programme.

== Research and publications ==
The college undertakes research and publishes research work through its institutional medical journal. Its academic activities include research-related work in medical and public health disciplines.

=== Ad-din Medical Journal ===
Ad-din Medical Journal (ADMJ) is a peer-reviewed, biannual medical journal published by Ad-din Momin Medical College. The journal publishes original research articles, review articles and case reports relating to medical science.

The journal publishes articles in English and follows the recommendations of the International Committee of Medical Journal Editors (ICMJE) for manuscript preparation. It uses the Vancouver style for references and subjects submitted manuscripts to peer review.

The journal publishes both original and review research as well as case reports. Its articles are published under a Creative Commons Attribution-NonCommercial (CC BY-NC) licence.

== See also ==
- University of Dhaka
- Bangladesh Medical and Dental Council
- Medical education in Bangladesh
- List of medical colleges in Bangladesh
