= National College of Home Economics =

Bangladeshi women's college in Dhaka

Coordinates: 23.7564°N 90.3698°E

National College of Home Economics, Dhaka
- Type: Non-government institution
- Established: 1998
- Affiliations: University of Dhaka
- Location: Dhaka, Bangladesh
- Campus: House:10, Road:1, Block-B, Future Socity, 40 feet, Mohammadpur, Dhaka
- Website: nche98.com

The National College of Home Economics is a constituent college of the University of Dhaka, directed by the governing body of the university. The Faculty of Biological Sciences of the university directly monitors all academic activities of the college. It was founded in 1998, and is a women's college.

== Courses ==
- Level of education- B.Sc. (Hons.) & M.S.
- Medium of education- Bengali & English
- No. of Honours Department- 05

== Departments ==
There are five departments:

1. Food and Nutrition
2. Resource management and Entrepreneurship
3. Child Development and Social Relationship
4. Art & Creative Studies
5. Clothing and Textile

== Admission ==
B.Sc: Admission test is conducted by Faculty of Biological Science of University of Dhaka. Students attempt a separate admission test for the Home Economics Unit. 550 students can get admitted each year, for B.Sc. course in this college.

== Campus ==
The campus is situated At House-10, Road-01, Block-B, Future Society, 40 Feet, Mohammadpur, Dhaka-1207.
