= Bangladesh Home Economics College =

College in Dhaka, Bangladesh

Coordinates: 23.7529°N 90.3875°E

Bangladesh Home Economics College, Dhaka
- Type: Non-Govt. Institution
- Established: 1996
- Affiliations: University of Dhaka
- Location: Dhaka, Bangladesh
- Campus: 146/4 Green Road, Dhaka
- Website: bhec.edu.bd

Bangladesh Home Economics College is a MPO approved non government college. It is a constituent college of the University of Dhaka. The Faculty of Biological Science of the University of Dhaka directly monitors all academic activities of the college. It was founded in 1996. It is an all girls' college.

== Campus ==
Campus is situated at 146/4 Green Road, near Pani Board., Dhaka, Bangladesh

== Courses ==
- Level of education is B.Sc. (Hons.), B.Sc(pass), M.S(Preli) & M.S.
- Medium of education is Bengali & English
- No. of Honours Department 05

== Departments ==
There are five departments:

- Food and Nutrition
- Resource Management and Entrepreneurship
- Child Development and Social Relationship
- Art and Creative Science
- Clothing and Textile

== Admission ==
B.Sc: Admission test is conducted by Faculty of Biological Science of University of Dhaka. Students give separate admission test for Home Economics Unit. 550 students can get admitted each year for B.Sc. Course.
