= CARe Medical College =

Medical school in Dhaka, Bangladesh

- কেয়ার মেডিকেল কলেজ
- Type: Private medical school
- Established: 2014
- Academic affiliations: University of Dhaka
- Chairman: Parveen Fatima
- Principal: N/A
- Students: 250
- Location: Mohammadpur, Dhaka, Bangladesh; 23.7619°N 90.3715°E
- Campus: 2/1-A, Iqbal Road(Asad Gate), Mohammadpur, Dhaka-1207.
- Website: caremedicalcollegebd.com

CARe Medical College (CAReMC) (Bengali: কেয়ার মেডিকেল কলেজ) is a private medical school in Asad Gate, Mohammadpur, Dhaka, Bangladesh. CAReMC was established in 2014. The college grew out of CARe Specialized Hospital. The name CARe stands for Center for Assisted Reproduction.

As of 2022, the degree awarded by CARE is not recognized by the Bangladesh Medical Dental Council. Although the certificate is given from Dhaka University, registration as a doctor is not given due to lack of approval. The college was blacklisted by the Ministry of Health and Planning of Bangladesh and a ban on admission was imposed.

The college is associated with CARe Specialized Hospital, a 250-bed hospital about 800 metres (2,600 ft) north, in College Gate. This was the first institute of assisted reproduction in the country that is equipped with the technologies required for in vitro fertilization (IVF). Triplets Heera, Moni, and Mukta, born at the centre on 30 May 2001, were the country's first IVF babies.

== History ==
CARe Medical College was established in 2014. The founder principal was late M Moazzam Hossain and the governing body chairman is Parveen Fatima.

CARe Specialized Hospital was renamed as CARe Medical College Hospital.

CARe IVF started its journey as Centre for Assisted Reproduction, in November 1999 at Shaymoli.

The first batch of patients comprised 26 couples. 11 conceived on 30 May 2001. Heera, Moni and Mukta were the first IVF babies of Bangladesh. On 20 June 2001 the first Intracytplasmic Sperm Injection baby of Bangladesh was born. The 100th ICSI baby was born on 9 June 2004. By 2008 CARe IVF had successfully delivered more than 500 babies.

== Founders ==
- Founder Principal M Moazzam Hossain MBBS, FCPS, FRCP (Edin)
- Parveen Fatima MBBS, FCPS (Obst & Gynae)

== Services ==
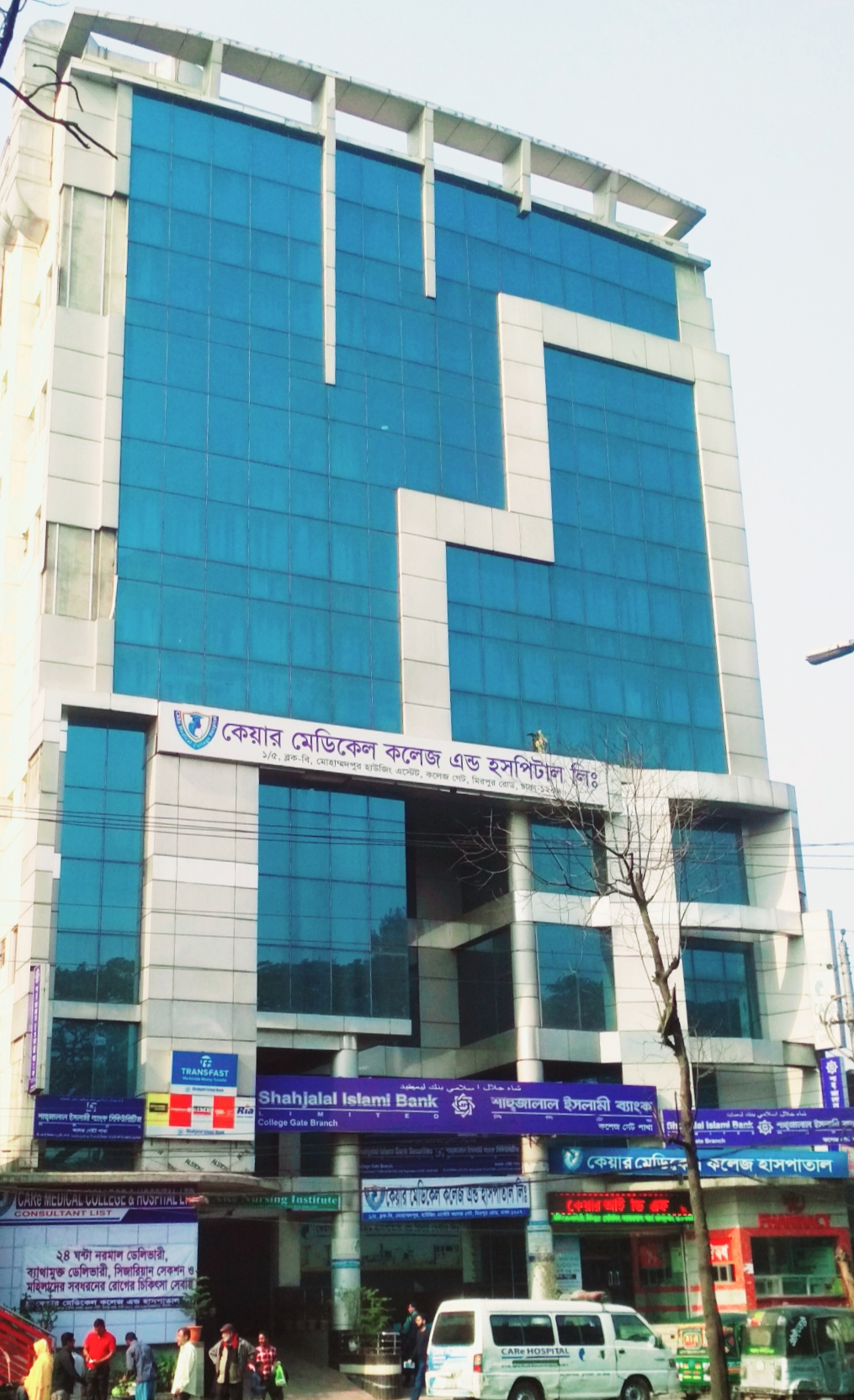
CARe Medical College Hospital Campus

CARe IVF operates on the third floor of CARe Hospital.

CARe IVF provides the most modern treatments for infertility, pertaining to international health guidelines. It expanded into the field of maternal and child healthcare. These services include maternal health checkups, counselling, child vaccinations and social awareness education about perinatal disease.

== See also ==
- List of medical colleges in Bangladesh
