= Dhaka School of Economics =

Bangladeshi educational institution

Coordinates: 23.7471°N 90.4017°E

- Founder: Qazi Kholiquzzaman Ahmad
- Established: April 2010
- Address: 4/C, Eskaton Garden Road, Dhaka-1000
- Location: Dhaka, Bangladesh
- Website: www.dsce.edu.bd

The Dhaka School of Economics (DScE) (Bengali: ঢাকা স্কুল অব ইকোনমিকস) is an autonomous institution under the University of Dhaka. DScE was founded in April 2010, following the model of the London School of Economics, to promote higher studies and research in economics and related subjects. Its goal is to accommodate the fast-growing demand for well-trained economists and professionals in related subjects. The current acting director of the Dhaka School of Economics (DScE) is Rehana Parvin, a Bangladeshi academic. She is also currently serving as the Coordinator of the Department of Entrepreneurship Economics at the Dhaka School of Economics, a constituent institution of the University of Dhaka.

== History ==
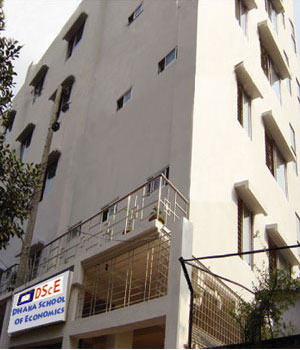
Dhaka School of Economics Campus

DScE resulted from the efforts of Bangladeshi economists to establish a Center of Excellence for higher studies in economics and related subjects, following the model of London School of Economics. Bangladesh Economic Association (BEA), led by its then President Qazi Kholiquzzaman Ahmad, took decisive steps that led to the founding of Dhaka School of Economics (DScE). Its establishment was announced by Bangladesh Prime Minister Sheikh Hasina on 8 April 2010 at the biennial conference of BEA. DScE is devoted to postgraduate studies:Bachelor, masters, post-graduate diploma, and eventually MPhil and PhD. For their future permanent campus, DScE also own 180 katha (39,000 sq. meter) land in Purbachal New Town near Dhaka.

== Governance ==
The Director of DScE runs the institution under the guidance of the Governing Council. An Academic Council helps design academic policies and programs, while several other committees provide financial management and administrative support. As a Constituent Institution of the University of Dhaka, DScE is run within the broad framework of rules and regulations of the university and the degrees and diplomas earned by students at DScE are University of Dhaka degrees and diplomas. The Governing Council is chaired by renowned Bangladeshi economist Qazi Kholiquzzaman Ahmad and following members are also included:

- Atiur Rahman, former governor, Bangladesh Bank.
- Abul Barkat, president, Bangladesh Economic Association
- Toufic Ahmad Choudhury, general secretary of Bangladesh Economic Association
- Md. Tafazzul Islam, former Chief Justice of Bangladesh
- Syed Manzur Elahi, chairman, Apex Group
- Mohammed Farasuddin, chairman, East West University
- Hafiz G.A. Siddiqi, former VC, North South University
- Saidur Rahman Lasker, former UN members.
- Rehana Parvin, Director

== Academic programs ==
DScE offers the following graduate programs:

- Masters in Environmental Economics
- Masters in Development Economics
- Master of Economics (Entrepreneurship Economics)
- Post Graduate Diploma in Economics
- Post Graduate Diploma in Enterprise Development
- Higher degrees on research will be introduced in phases.
- Bachelor of Economics in Environmental and Resource Economics.
- Bachelor of Economics in Development Economics.
- Bachelor of Economics in Entrepreneurship Economics.

== Research and other programs ==
DScE's current programs also include monthly seminar program on issues of development of national and international significance; a research program on important issues of academic and policy interest.
