= Dr. Sirajul Islam Medical College =

Private medical college in Dhaka, Bangladesh

- ডা. সিরাজুল ইসলাম মেডিকেল কলেজ
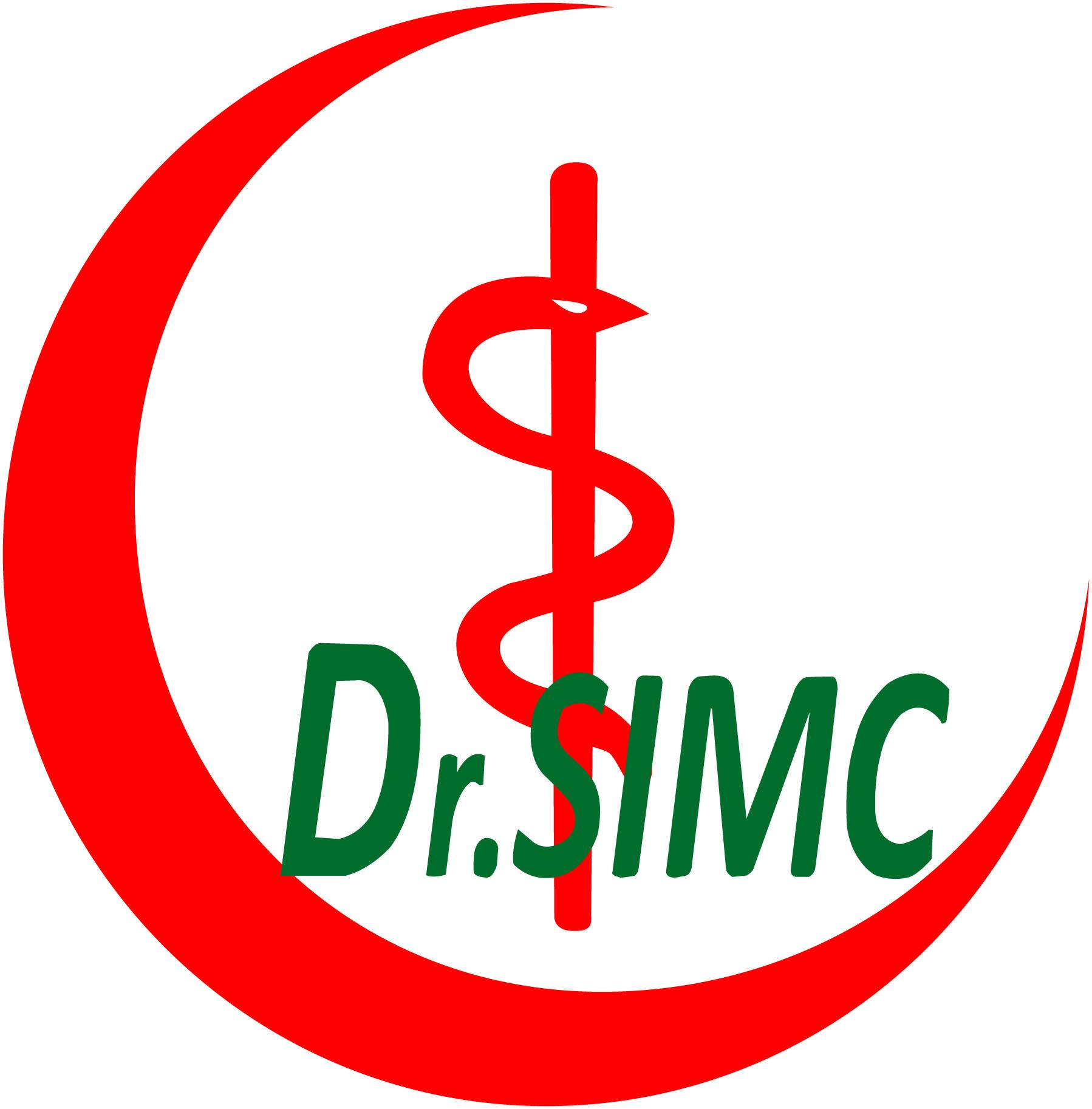
- Logo of Dr. Sirajul Islam Medical College
- Type: Private medical school
- Established: 2011
- Founder: Sirajul Islam
- Academic affiliations: University of Dhaka
- Principal: Farukul Islam
- Academic staff: 14 (2015)
- Location: Malibagh, Dhaka, Bangladesh; 23.7472°N 90.4105°E
- Campus: Urban
- Website: drsimc.com

Dr. Sirajul Islam Medical College (Dr.SIMC) (Bengali: ডা. সিরাজুল ইসলাম মেডিকেল কলেজ) is a private medical college located in Maghbazar, Dhaka, Bangladesh. The college is affiliated with the University of Dhaka as a constituent college.

It offers a five-year course of study leading to a Bachelor of Medicine, Bachelor of Surgery (MBBS) degree. A one-year internship after graduation is compulsory for all graduates. The degree is recognised by the Bangladesh Medical and Dental Council.

== History ==
Dr. Sirajul Islam Medical College was established in 2011, and the college received instructions for student admission. The instruction started from the 2011 to 2012 academic year. Academic classes began on 17 January 2012, which is celebrated as "SIMC Day".

== Campus ==
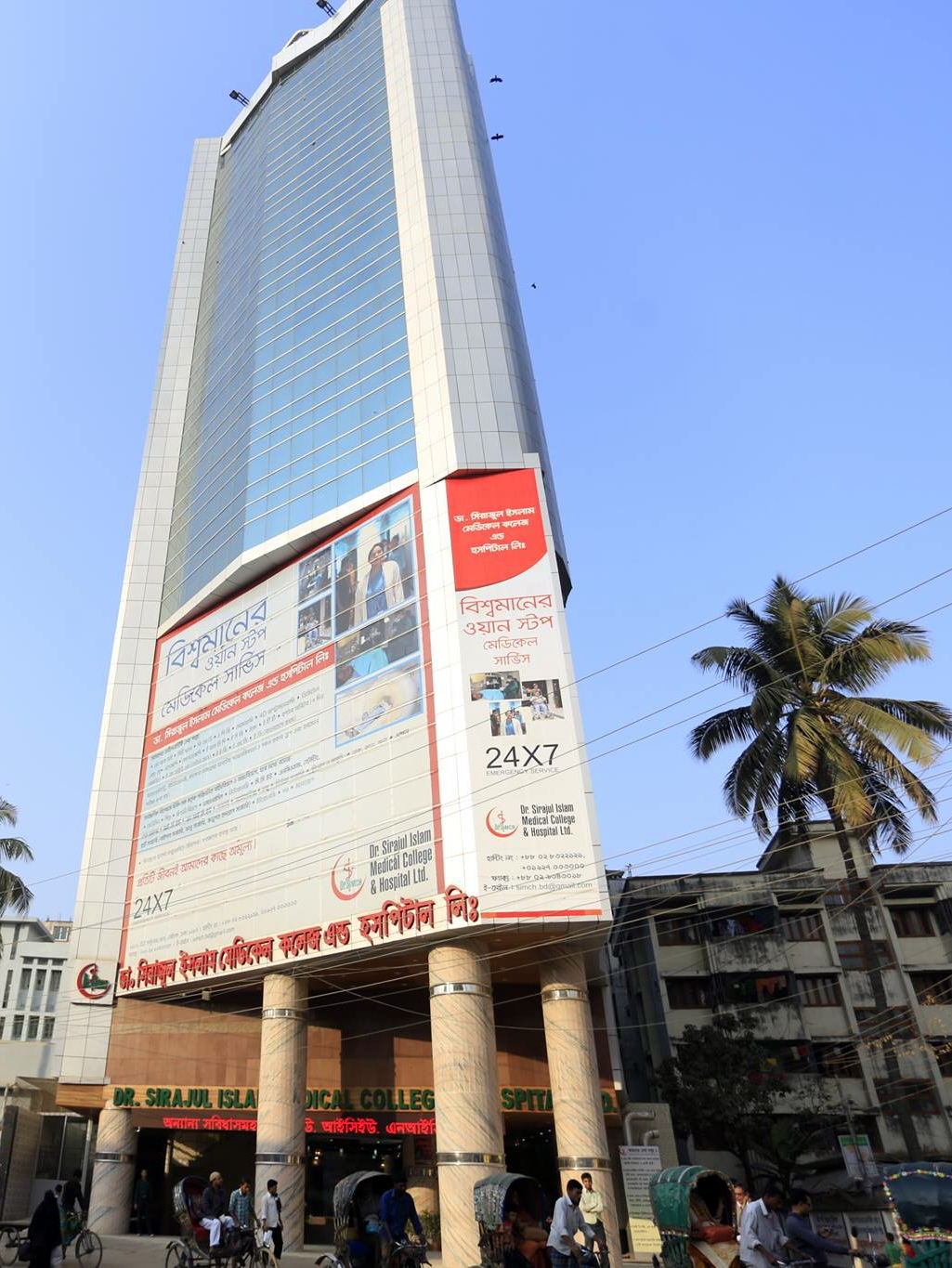
A 21 storied 500 bedded hospital in the Dhaka City.

The college is located in Maghbazar, Dhaka. An associated 500-bed hospital is proposed. Students of Dr. Sirajul Islam Medical College are called Simcianz, a term that also refers to alumni of the college.

== Organization and administration ==
The college is affiliated with Dhaka University as a constituent college. The founder chairman of the college was Dr. Sirajul Islam.

== Academics ==
The college offers a five-year course of study, approved by the Bangladesh Medical and Dental Council (BMDC), leading to a Bachelor of Medicine, Bachelor of Surgery (MBBS) degree from Dhaka University. After passing the final professional examination, there is a compulsory one-year internship. The internship is a prerequisite for obtaining registration from the BMDC to practice medicine. In October 2014, the Ministry of Health and Family Welfare capped admission and tuition fees at private medical colleges at 1,990,000 Bangladeshi taka (US$25,750 as of 2014) total for their five-year courses.

Admission for Bangladeshis to the MBBS programmes at all medical colleges in Bangladesh (government and private) is conducted centrally by the Directorate General of Health Services (DGHS). It administers a written multiple choice question exam simultaneously throughout the country. Candidates are admitted based primarily on their score on this test, although grades at the Secondary School Certificate (SSC) and Higher Secondary School Certificate (HSC) levels also play a part. As of July 2014, the college is allowed to admit 70 students annually. When the 2014 admission deadline passed, 45% of the allowable annual intake remained unfilled.

== See also ==
- List of medical colleges in Bangladesh
