= Bangladesh Economic Association =

Research institute in Bangladesh

- Headquarters: Dhaka, Bangladesh
- Region served: Bangladesh
- Official language: Bengali
- Website: bea-bd.org

Bangladesh Economic Association (Bengali: বাংলাদেশ অর্থনীতি সমিতি) is an association of professional economists in Bangladesh. The association has more than 4000 members.

== History ==
The Bangladesh Economic Association established the Dhaka School of Economics in February 2012.

In 2017, Abul Barakat was elected president of the association and Jamaluddin Ahmed was elected its general secretary. It is a member of the International Economic Association.

Following the fall of the Sheikh Hasina led Awami League government, anti-discrimination BEA took control over the organization through an ad hoc committee but were rejected by the association. The association created an interim committee led by Mohammed Helal Uddin, Abu Ahmed, Mahbub Ullah, and 26 others. The new interim committee called for arrest of those responsible for attacks on association office on 12 and 17 February.
