= United States sanctions on Bangladesh =

In 2021, the United States imposed government sanctions on Rapid Action Battalion (RAB), an elite security force, and six of its officials on charges of involvement in serious human rights violations in the country. Under the Magnitsky Act, it was first such case of sanctions by the United States government on the South Asian country.

Apart from this, a Russian cargo ship carrying equipment for the Rooppur Nuclear Power Plant was also under U.S. sanctions, and as a result, even after changing its name and color, the ship could not dock at a Bangladeshi port. It had previously been stated that allowing the ship to dock in Bangladesh would be considered a violation of U.S. sanctions.

After the imposition of U.S. sanctions on Bangladesh, a controversy began regarding Bangladesh appointing lobbyists in the United States.

== Background ==
Allegations of extrajudicial killings and enforced disappearances against RAB by the United States as examples of human rights violations are not new. Rather, incidents of extrajudicial killings and disappearances in Bangladesh have long been cited in the U.S. annual human rights reports. Human rights activists state that crossfire has been ongoing in the South Asian country for a long time. Moreover, the United States is not alone in doing this; over the past decade, the European Parliament has repeatedly expressed concern and passed resolutions regarding Bangladesh's human rights situation. The Human Rights Watch, the Amnesty International, and the Asian Human Rights Council have been reporting on this for at least a decade and have presented ample examples in reports published at various times.

According to various non-governmental organizations, since 2009 there have been over six hundred enforced disappearances, nearly 600 extrajudicial killings since 2018, and RAB and other law enforcement agencies have been held responsible for torture under the Awami League government led by Sheikh Hasina. Some reports also mention that opposition party leaders and activists, journalists, and human rights activists have been targeted in these incidents. Since 2010, at least 298 individuals, most of them opposition party leaders and activists, have been forcibly disappeared by state security forces in Bangladesh. A report published by a domestic human rights organization reveals that from January to September 2014, 82 individuals went missing. Of those, at least 39 were later found dead, while the rest remain unaccounted for.

On 25 June 2010, opposition leader Chowdhury Alam was arrested by the state police and has been missing since. Law enforcement agencies later denied any involvement in his disappearance. On 17 April 2012, another leader of the main opposition party, the Bangladesh Nationalist Party (BNP), Ilias Ali, was disappeared by unknown armed individuals. This incident received widespread attention in the media. In the lead-up to the controversial 2014 general election, at least 19 opposition individuals were taken away by security forces. Such cases of enforced disappearances have been condemned by both domestic and international human rights organizations. Despite demands made to the government, there has been noticeable indifference in taking initiative to investigate such disappearances and related cases.

One notable case of extrajudicial killing is the murder of Ekramul Haque, former president of the Teknaf branch of the Jubo League, businessman, and three-time consecutively elected councilor of Teknaf Municipality as an Awami League candidate, who was killed in a gunfight with the RAB on 27 May 2018, under the leadership of Squadron Leader Mohammad Rezaul Haque. On 26 May 2018, a day before the alleged gunfight, a recording of Haque's last phone call was leaked, in which he was speaking to his wife Ayesha Begum. During the conversation, the screams of Haque's wife and daughters can be heard. The sounds of gunfire and the cries of a person in agony are also audible during the call.

On 24 November 2021, Bangladesh was not invited to the United States' Democracy Summit. Subsequently, on 10 December, the United States imposed sanctions on seven current and former officers of the RAB on charges of serious human rights violations.

== Sanctions on RAB ==
Although RAB succeeded in arresting several top terrorists including the notorious Bangla Bhai, Human Rights Watch accused RAB of numerous deaths due to crossfire. In March 2010, a RAB official claimed that 622 people had died due to "crossfire", whereas some human rights organizations alleged that over 1,000 extrajudicial killings were the result of RAB's operations. In addition, there have been many reports of torture associated with RAB's activities. According to Human Rights Watch, members of the Rapid Action Battalion shot and killed women and children during mass protests. The human rights group described RAB as a "death squad".

Sixteen officers of RAB-11, including Lieutenant Colonel (dismissed) Tareque Sayeed, Major (dismissed) Arif Hossain, and Lieutenant Commander (dismissed) Masud Rana, were sentenced to death for abduction, murder, concealment of bodies, conspiracy, and destruction of evidence in the Narayanganj seven murder case. In the same case, nine more officers of RAB-11 were sentenced to imprisonment ranging from 7 to 17 years. The RAB has also been accused of framing a Bangladeshi expatriate named Shamim Sikder with false allegations of drugs and counterfeit currency and of torture while in police custody. On 2015, Reports also reveal that at least 70 leaders and activists of the opposition political parties, the BNP and Jamaat-e-Islami, have been victims of enforced disappearance, including 37 activists of then-ruling Awami League.

On 27 October 2020, the United States Senate Foreign Relations Committee sent a message to the U.S. Secretary of State and the U.S. Secretary of Treasury urging sanctions against senior officials of the RAB for human rights violations. On 10 December 2021, under GLOMAG, the Department of Treasury designated RAB on its Specially Designated Nationals (SDN) list. Sanctions were also imposed on six individuals associated with RAB. Persons and entities on the list were subjected to asset blocking and prohibited from engaging in any transactions with U.S. persons. The six officials mentioned in the notification are:

- Chowdhury Abdullah Al Mamun, former Director General of RAB
- Benazir Ahmed, former Director General of RAB, January 2015 – April 2020
- Colonel Khan Mohammad Azad, former Additional Director General (Operations)
- Colonel Tofael Mustafa Sarwar, former Additional Director General (Operations), June 2019 – March 2021
- Colonel Mohammad Jahangir Alam, former Additional Director General (Operations), September 2018 – June 2019
- Colonel Mohammad Anwar Latif Khan, former Additional Director General (Operations), April 2016 – September 2018

The notification states that due to involvement in serious human rights violations, the U.S. State Department has announced a visa restriction on Benazir Ahmed, making him ineligible to enter the United States.

Bangladesh's Foreign Minister AK Abdul Momen sent an open letter to then-Secretary of State Antony Blinken requesting reconsideration of the sanctions against RAB. Meanwhile, U.S. Congressman and Chairman of the U.S. House Foreign Affairs Committee Gregory W. Meeks strongly supported the U.S. government's sanctions, stating that blanket sanctions against Bangladesh were unnecessary, but targeted sanctions against specific individuals and entities were very effective.

== Sanctioned Russian ship ==
During conflicting statements between the Russian and U.S. embassies in Dhaka regarding the situation in Bangladesh, a Russian ship was not allowed to enter Bangladesh. On December 24, 2022, the Russian ship Ursa Major was bringing cargo for the Rooppur Nuclear Power Plant. However, due to U.S. sanctions on the ship, it was turned back without entering Bangladesh's territorial waters. This was because, two days earlier, the U.S. had informed Bangladesh about the sanctions on the ship.

Earlier, in October, Russia had sought permission from Bangladesh to send the cargo through the Mongla Port. At that time, they mentioned that the cargo ship's name was Sparta-3. However, since the ship was under sanctions, they changed the name of the ship to Ursa Major. But according to international regulations, every ship must have a number, and this change was detected.

Even though the ship could not anchor in Bangladesh due to the name change, it docked at a port in India. Later, Bangladesh arranged to bring the materials for the nuclear power plant to the country through an indirect route using an Indian port.

== Reactions ==
=== Bangladesh ===
Bangladesh claims that the sanctions imposed by the United States on RAB and its former and current seven officials are not based on factual information. The Ministry of Foreign Affairs summoned U.S. Ambassador Earl Miller to explain the U.S. sanctions on RAB and its former and current chiefs. Bangladesh expressed dissatisfaction with the imposition of unilateral sanctions on six officials, including the police chief (IGP) and the former and current heads of RAB, without any discussion with the government.

=== United States ===
In February 2023, a senior U.S. diplomat visiting Bangladesh stated that the United States would not lift the sanctions on Bangladesh's elite police unit, accused of extrajudicial killings, until reforms are made.

== Impact ==
U.S. Ambassador to Bangladesh, Peter Haas, while attending the inauguration of the MTK event organized by the U.S. Embassy, stated that the U.S. sanctions on RAB would not affect the relationship between the two countries. The European Union (EU) Ambassador to Bangladesh, Charles Whiteley, also mentioned that he did not see any signs that the U.S. sanctions decision would impact European trade advantages or advance business in Bangladesh.

On the other hand, the Director General (DG) of the Rapid Action Battalion (RAB), Additional IGP Chowdhury Abdullah Al Mamun, one of the sanctioned persona, commented that the U.S. sanctions on RAB have had no effect on the operations of the battalion.

According to a report by AFP, the human rights organization Odhikar, which maintains detailed records, claims that since Prime Minister Sheikh Hasina came to power in 2009, nearly 2,500 Bangladeshi citizens have been killed by security forces and several hundred others have been forcibly disappeared. It further states that Odhikar recorded about 1,200 deaths, or an average of 25 per month, in the past four years. However, according to them, after Washington imposed sanctions on RAB and its seven top officials under the Magnitsky Act on 10 December, no further killings occurred. Odhikar reports that from January to September 2022, 16 people were victims of enforced disappearances, according to CGS research, that number was 22, and 24 people were victims throughout the year.

Donald Lu, United States Assistant Secretary of State for South and Central Asian Affairs, praised the reduction in extrajudicial killings due to the sanctions on the RAB. However, he did not provide any timeline for when the sanctions on RAB would be lifted.

While the Russian ship, Ursa Major, which was flagged by Russia, attempted to dock at Kolkata's Haldia Port after being denied entry at a Bangladeshi port. The ship then made preparations to bring its cargo to Bangladesh by road. However, after waiting for almost two weeks without receiving permission, the Russian ship, under U.S. sanctions, left India's waters on 16 January without unloading its cargo. Bangladesh took the matter of the Russian ship under U.S. sanctions very seriously.

Following diplomatic talks between Bangladesh, Russia, and India, the Russian ship prepared to dock at Haldia Port in Kolkata. However, the issue of the ship came up during a recent visit by U.S. Assistant Secretary of State for South and Central Asia, Donald Lu, to India and Bangladesh. At that time, Donald Lu raised the matter of the sanctions with both Dhaka and Delhi. As a result, the ship could not unload its cargo in India.

== See also ==
- Bangladesh–United States relations
- Human rights in Bangladesh
- Extrajudicial killings and enforced disappearances in Bangladesh
- Crossfire (Bangladesh)
- Criticism of Awami League
- Premiership of Sheikh Hasina
- United States sanctions
- United States sanctions against China
- Jatiya Rakkhi Bahini
