= Miftah Uddin Ahmed =

Bangladeshi army officer

- মিফতাহ উদ্দিন আহমেদ
- Born: November 21, 1973 (age 53)
- Military career
- Allegiance: Bangladesh
- Branch: Bangladesh Army
- Service years: 1995—present
- Rank: Colonel
- Unit: Bangladesh Infantry Regiment
- Commands: CO of RAB – 7; CO of 27th Bangladesh Infantry Regiment; AQ of 19th Infantry Division
- Known for: Specially Designated Nationals; Killing of Ekramul Haque
- Awards: Sena Utkorsho Padak (SUP)
- Police career
- Unit: Rapid Action Battalion
- Allegiance: Bangladesh
- Branch: Bangladesh Police
- Service years: 2015–2019
- Rank: Director
- Awards: BPM (Bar); BPM (bsa); PPM

Miftah Uddin Ahmed is a colonel of the Bangladesh Army and ex-officer of the Rapid Action Battalion. Ahmed has been sanctioned by the United States for human rights violations, specifically for extrajudicial killings in Bangladesh.

== Career ==
Ahmed was commissioned in the 32nd BMA Long Course on 16 June 1995.

Ahmed oversaw the arrest of the owner, Abu Bakar Siddique, of M.V. Pinak, a ferry that sank in the Padma River, killing 48, after the owner went into hiding. Siddique had been charged with culpable homicide for overloading the ferry that led to its sinking.

Commanding officer of Rapid Action Battalion-7, Ahmed, led a raid on a farm in Chittagong and recovered a significant amount of firearms and detained five in 2015. His team raided a residence in Chittagong and detained four people with bombs in February 2015.

In 2017, Ahmed, as commanding officer of Rapid Action Battalion-7, led a crackdown on Shaheed Hamza Brigade, an Islamist militant group. It arrested businessman Enamul Haque, who allegedly provided funding to the group.

On 18 April 2016, two robbers were killed in a gunfight with Rapid Action Battalion-7, which Ahmed commanded, in Mirsharai Upazila. In July, his team detained Mozaher Hossain Mia, who supplied weapons to the militants involved with the July 2016 Dhaka attack. His unit recovered more drugs from Chittagong that year in cartons of light bulbs. In October 2016, three other robbers died in a shootout with Ahmed's unit.

Ahmed, commanding officer (CO) of Rapid Action Battalion-7, announced the confiscation of 1.5 million Ya ba tablets and the arrest of five Myanmar citizens on 25 June 2017.

In January 2018, Ahmed was awarded for bravery in service by the government of Bangladesh. Ahmed was serving as commanding officer of Rapid Action Battalion-7 when Ekramul Haque, a councilor of Tekhnaf Municipality, was killed in a shootout with RAB on 27 May 2018. Ahmed called Ekramul a "top godfather of Yaba' trading" after his death and alleged there were many cases against him.

== U.S. sanctions ==
On 10 December 2021, the U.S. Department of the Treasury placed Ahmed on its Specially Designated Nationals (SDN) list under the Global Magnitsky Act for engaging in serious human rights abuses relating to his tenure at the Rapid Action Battalion, including the killing of Ekramul Haque. Inspector General of Bangladesh Police Benazir Ahmed was also one of the five individuals sanctioned, including Miftah. He was also sanctioned by the U.S. Department of State. The additional individuals sanctioned include Chowdhury Abdullah Al-Mamun (DG since April 2020), Khan Mohammad Azad (ADG since March 2021), and former ADGs Tofayel Mustafa Sorwar (2019–2021), Mohammad Jahangir Alam (2018–2019), and Mohammad Anwar Latif Khan (2016–2018).
