= Kamrul =

Kamrul is a given name. Notable people with the name include:

- Kamrul Ahsan, Bangladeshi diplomat
- Kamrul Hasan Bhuiyan (1952–2018), Bangladeshi Major in the Bangladesh Army
- Kamrul Hassan (disambiguation), multiple people
- Kazi Kamrul Hassan (born 1961), retired Bangladesh Navy commodore, former MD of Khulna Shipyard
- SM Kamrul Hassan, two-star general of the Bangladesh Army
- Kamrul Islam Imon (born 1986), aka "Imon", Bangladeshi first-class and List A cricketer
- Kamrul Islam (Physician), Bangladeshi doctor who won the Independence Award in 2022
- Kazi Kamrul Islam (born 1987), Bangladeshi first-class cricketer
- Kamrul Laila Jolly, Bangladesh Awami League politician and MP
- K. M. Kamrul Kader (born 1964), Bangladeshi justice of the High Court Division Supreme Court of Bangladesh
- Kamrul Asraf Khan (born 1960), Bangladeshi businessman, former independent politician and MP
- Kamrul Hasan Khan, Vice Chancellor of Bangabandhu Sheikh Mujib Medical University
- Kamrul Islam Rabbi (born 1991), Bangladeshi cricketer
