= Ghorashal =

Ghorashal ঘোড়াশাল
- City
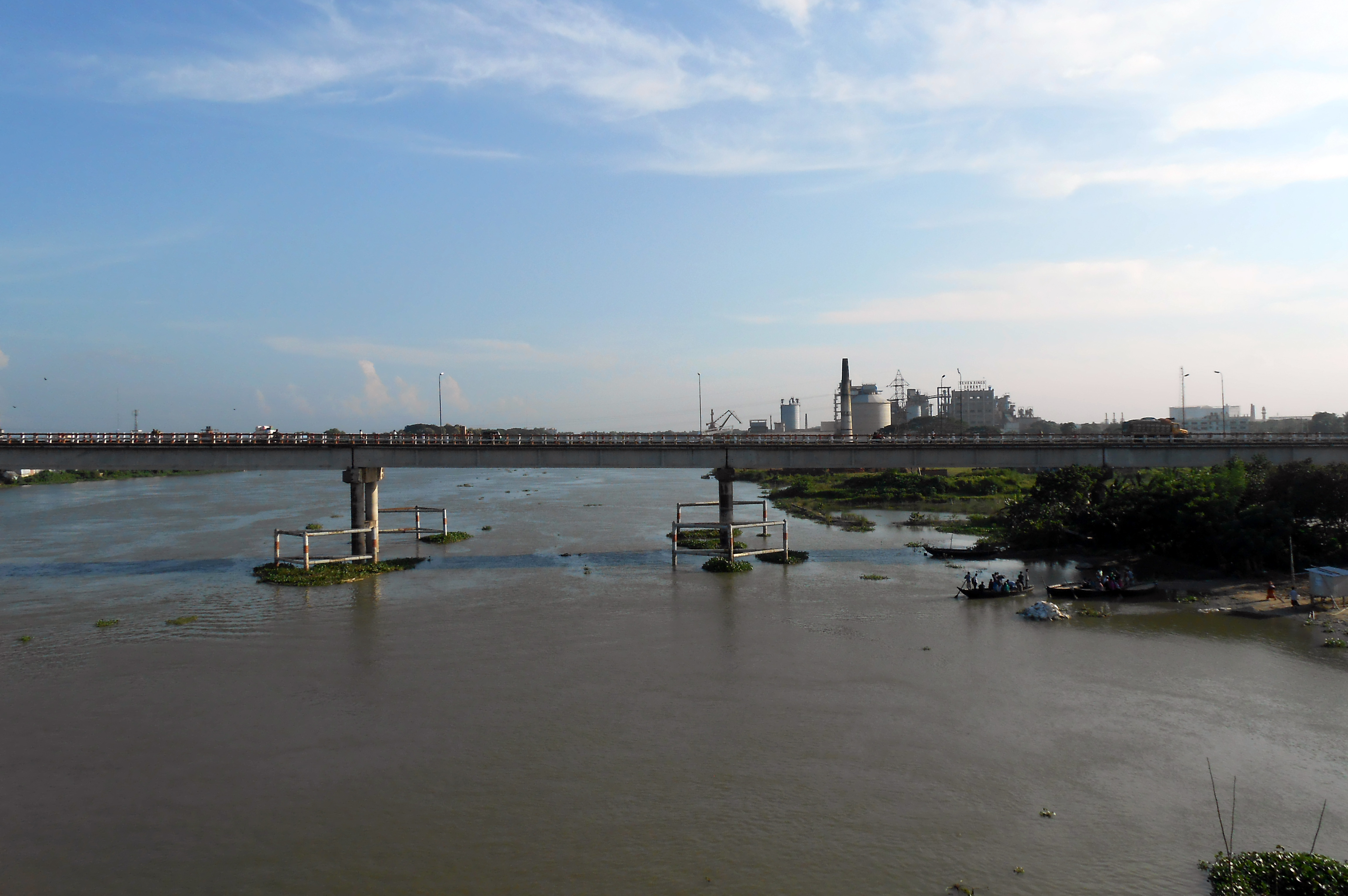
- Shaheed Moyez Uddin Bridge over the Shitalakshya River

- Location in Dhaka division Location in Bangladesh
- Coordinates: 23.940°N 90.622°E
- Country: Bangladesh
- Division: Dhaka
- District: Narsingdi
- Upazila: Palash

Government
  - Type: Paurashava
  - Body: Ghorsahal Paurashava
  - Mayor: Vacant (AL)

Area
  - City: 26.5 km^{2} (10.2 sq mi)

Population (2022)
  - City: 101,689
  - Density: 3,840/km^{2} (9,940/sq mi)
- Time zone: UTC+6 (BST)
- Website: ghorashalpourashava.gov.bd

Ghorashal Municipality mahallah geocode map

Ghorashal (Bengali: ঘোড়াশাল) is a municipality in the Palash Upazila in the Narsingdi District in central Bangladesh. According to the 2022 Bangladesh census, its population stood at 101,000. This municipality is the home to the largest power plant in Bangladesh, which began operation in 1974.

== Location ==
Ghorashal is located in eastern Bangladesh, in Narsingdi District. It is situated on the banks of the Shitalakshya River.

== History and naming ==
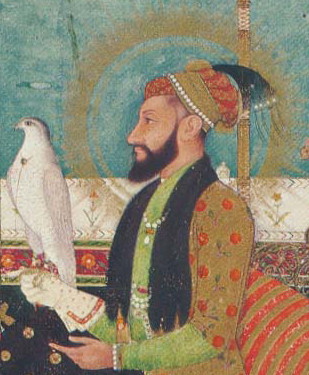

During the reign of Emperor Aurangzeb of Delhi, a powerful and wise man named Sheikh Ghulam Mohammad lived in Tekpara of this area. His name was also well known in the royal court of Delhi. Sheikh Ghulam Mohammad was a powerful and wise man of that time. In his prudence, the Delhi court settled a serious allegation against zamindar Sharif Khan. Emperor Aurangzeb was pleased with the intelligence of Sheikh Ghulam Mohammad. As a reward, Sheikh Ghulam Mohammad was given a handsome horse. Gave another shawl as a gift. Horses and shawls are the names given to this area.

It is known from the description of history, about three hundred and fifty years ago. At that time Sharif Khan, a descendant of Isa Khan, was the zamindar of Sharifpur. Although Sharif Khan was a zamindar, he was an independent king. The Mughal emperor had no right to interfere in the internal affairs of the zamindari without paying taxes. Zamindar Sharif Khan, son of Sharif Khan's tenant Mohammad Rafi, filed a serious complaint against him at the Delhi royal court. The trial of this allegation led to an extreme dispute between Zamindar Sharif Khan and the Delhi royal court. In a written decree of the emperor of Delhi, Sheikh Ghulam Mohammad settled the dispute and made a treaty of Sharif Khan with the emperor of Delhi. Both Emperor Aurangzeb and Zamindar Sharif Khan were very pleased with the diligence and prudence of Sheikh Ghulam Mohammad. Then, as a reward for this work, Emperor Aurangzeb presented a horse and a valuable shawl to Sheikh Ghulam Mohammad. Zamindar Sharif Khan and his adopted daughter Chand Bibi married Sheikh Golam Nabi, the second son of Sheikh Golam Mohammad, and gave him small villages called Charpara, Tekpara, Tengarpara, Binati, Kartail, Rajab and Chamrab as gifts.

People started coming to the house of Sheikh Ghulam Mohammad in groups to see the horses and shawls given by Emperor Aurangzeb. "Where are you going?" When asked, they said "Going see the horse and the shawl." From then on, Sheikh Ghulam Mohammad's village and this area became known as Ghorashal.

Ghorashal Municipality was established on 20 October 1997.

== Demographics ==
Religions in Ghorashal (2011)
Religion	Percent
Islam	89.36%
Hinduism	10.56%
Other or not stated	0.08%

According to the 2022 Bangladesh census, Ghorashal city had a population of 101,689 and a literacy rate of 82.70%.

According to the 2011 Bangladesh census, Ghorashal city had 18,868 households and a population of 85,949. 17,003 (19.78%) were under 10 years of age. Ghorashal had a literacy rate (age 7 and over) of 66.59%, compared to the national average of 51.8%, and a sex ratio of 926 females per 1000 males.

== Population and size ==
The municipality consists of 9 wards and covers an area of 26.5 km^{2}. 101,000 people live here. The total number of voters is 56,300. Ghorashal on the east bank of the Shitalakshya river is known as an industrial area.

== Public representative ==
The present mayor- Vacant List of Mayors

- Md. Elias Mridha (2)
- Md. Shariful Haque (3)
- Al Mujahid Hossain Tushar

== Notable personalities ==
- Kamrul Asraf Khan (Poton)
- Ahmedul Kabir
- Abdul Moyeen Khan
