= Kamrul Hassan =

Kamrul Hassan or Kamrul Hasan may refer to:

- Quamrul Hassan, Bangladeshi artist
- Kamrul Hasan (secretary), Bangladeshi civil servant
- Mohammad Kamrul Hassan, Bangladeshi army officer
- Mohammad Kamrul Hasan, Bandladeshi Army general
- Kamrul Hasan Bhuiyan, Bangladeshi Army major
- Md. Quamrul Hassan, Bangladeshi politician
