= Ahmadul Kabir =

Bangladeshi politician and journalist

Ahmadul Kabir Manu Miah
- আহমেদুল কবির

Member of Jatiya Sangsad (Dhaka-25/Narsingdi-2)
- In office 1979-1988
- Preceded by: Mosleh Uddin Ahmed
- Succeeded by: Delwar Hossain Khan

Personal details
- Born: 3 February 1923 Ghorashal, Palash, Narsingdi, Bengal Presidency, British Raj
- Died: 24 November 2003 (aged 80) Apollo Gleneagles Hospital, Kolkata, West Bengal, India
- Party: National Awami Party, Independent,
- Spouse: Laila Rahman
- Children: Nihad Kabir, Altamash Kabir, Ardashir Kabir
- Parents: Abu Yusuf Lutful Kabir Fenu Miah (father); Sufia Khatun (mother)
- Education: University of Dhaka
- Occupation: Journalist, politician

Ahmadul Kabir (Bengali: আহমেদুল কবির), also known as Manu Miah (Bengali: মনু মিঞা), was a Bangladeshi politician and journalist. He was the founding General Secretary of the Ganatantri Party and part of the Independent University, Bangladesh's Governing and Trustee Board.

== Early life ==
Ahmadul Kabir was born on 3 February 1923 in Ghorashal, Palash Upazila, Narsingdi District, East Bengal, British India. He belonged to a Bengali Muslim family of zamindars, and his father was Abu Yusuf Lutful Kabir Fenu Miah and mother was Sufia Khatun.

Ahmadul Kabir enrolled at the University of Dhaka where he studied economics. He served as the Sports Secretary for the Salimullah Muslim Hall Students' Union from 1942 to 1943. In 1945, he was elected to be the vice-president of the Dhaka University Central Students' Union.

== Career ==
Ahmadul Kabir worked at the Reserve Bank of India after completing his education. After the Partition of India in 1947, he served as the head of East Pakistan Foreign Exchange Department. He resigned from government service in January 1954 to start his business. He was a founding director of Eastern Mercantile Bank. He also founded IFIC Bank, Bengal Beverage Company, Essential Industries, and a bottling plant of Vita Cola.

Ahmadul Kabir worked at The Sangbad from its start in 1951. He was elected to the East Pakistan Provincial Assembly in 1965 as a National Awami Party candidate, and supported autonomy for East Pakistan; writing about it in the Sangbad. He was arrested after the start of Bangladesh Liberation War and the publication of the newspaper was stopped after the office was burnt down by the authorities. The publication resumed after the independence of Bangladesh and he became its editor on 9 January 1972.

Ahmadul Kabir was independently elected to the Jatiya Sangsad in 1979 for the Dhaka-25 constituency. He was re-elected in 1986 for the same constituency (renamed to Narsingdi-2), again as an independent candidate. He served as the treasurer of Krishak Samiti. In 1990, he became the founding president and founding general secretary of the Ganatanri Party. Ahmadul Kabir was also the chairman of Commonwealth Press Union's Bangladesh unit, which led to him travelling across the world to places such as Glasgow, Hong Kong and The Bahamas.

== Death and legacy ==
Ahmadul Kabir died on 24 November 2003 in Apollo Gleneagles Hospital, Kolkata, India. He left behind a wife, Laila Rahman, a daughter, Nihad Kabir and two sons, Altamash Kabir and Ardashir Kabir. His residence has become a popular tourist site.
