= Asraf =

Asraf is a name. Notable people with the name include:

- Asraf Rashid (born 1985), Singaporean footballer
- Amiruldin Asraf (born 1997), Singaporean footballer
- Dzaky Asraf (born 2003), Indonesian footballer
- Kamrul Asraf Khan (born 1960), Bangladeshi businessman
- Famirul Asraf Sayuti (born 1989), Malaysian footballer
