= Anwarul Ashraf Khan =

Bangladeshi politician

Member of the Bangladesh Parliament for Narsingdi-2
- In office 30 January 2019 – 6 August 2024
- Preceded by: Kamrul Asraf Khan
- In office 25 January 2009 – 24 January 2014
- Preceded by: Abdul Moyeen Khan

Personal details
- Born: 1 October 1956 (age 70)
- Party: Bangladesh Awami League
- Education: Mymensingh Medical College

Anwarul Ashraf Khan (born 1 October 1956) is a Bangladesh Awami League politician and a former Jatiya Sangsad member representing the Narsingdi-2 constituency.

== Early life ==
Khan was born on 1 October 1956. He graduated from medical school with a MBBS and worked as a doctor.

== Career ==
Khan was elected to parliament in 2008 from Narsingdi-2 as a Bangladesh Awami League candidate. He served as a member of the Parliamentary Standing Committee on Ministry of Industry. He is the president of the Palash Upazila unit of the Bangladesh Awami League. He was re-elected from Narsingdi-2 as a Bangladesh Awami League candidate on 30 December 2018. He was re-elected in 2024.
