= Haripada Datta =

Bangladeshi novelist

- Born: January 2, 1947 (age 79)
- Occupation: Novelist
- Awards: Bangla Academy Literary Award

Haripada Datta (born January 2, 1947) is a Bangladeshi novelist. He is one of the winners of the 2006 Bangla Academy Literary Award.

Datta was born in Khanepur village, British India (now in Palash Upazila, Narsingdi District, Bangladesh).

== Bibliography ==
Short Story collections

- Surjer Ghrane Phera (1985)
- Joal Bangar Pala (1985)

Novels

- Eshane Ognidaho [Conflagration in the North-East] (1986)
- Ondhokupe Jonmothsob [Birth Ceremony in the Black Hole] (1987)
- Ojogor [A Boa] (1989 and 1991)
- Jonmo-Jonmantor [Birth and Rebirth] (2000)
- Drabirgram (2003)

== Awards ==
- Sada't Ali Akanda Literary prize (2001)
- Bangla Academy Literary Award (2006)
