= Parulia Shahi Mosque =

Mosque in Parulia, Bangladesh

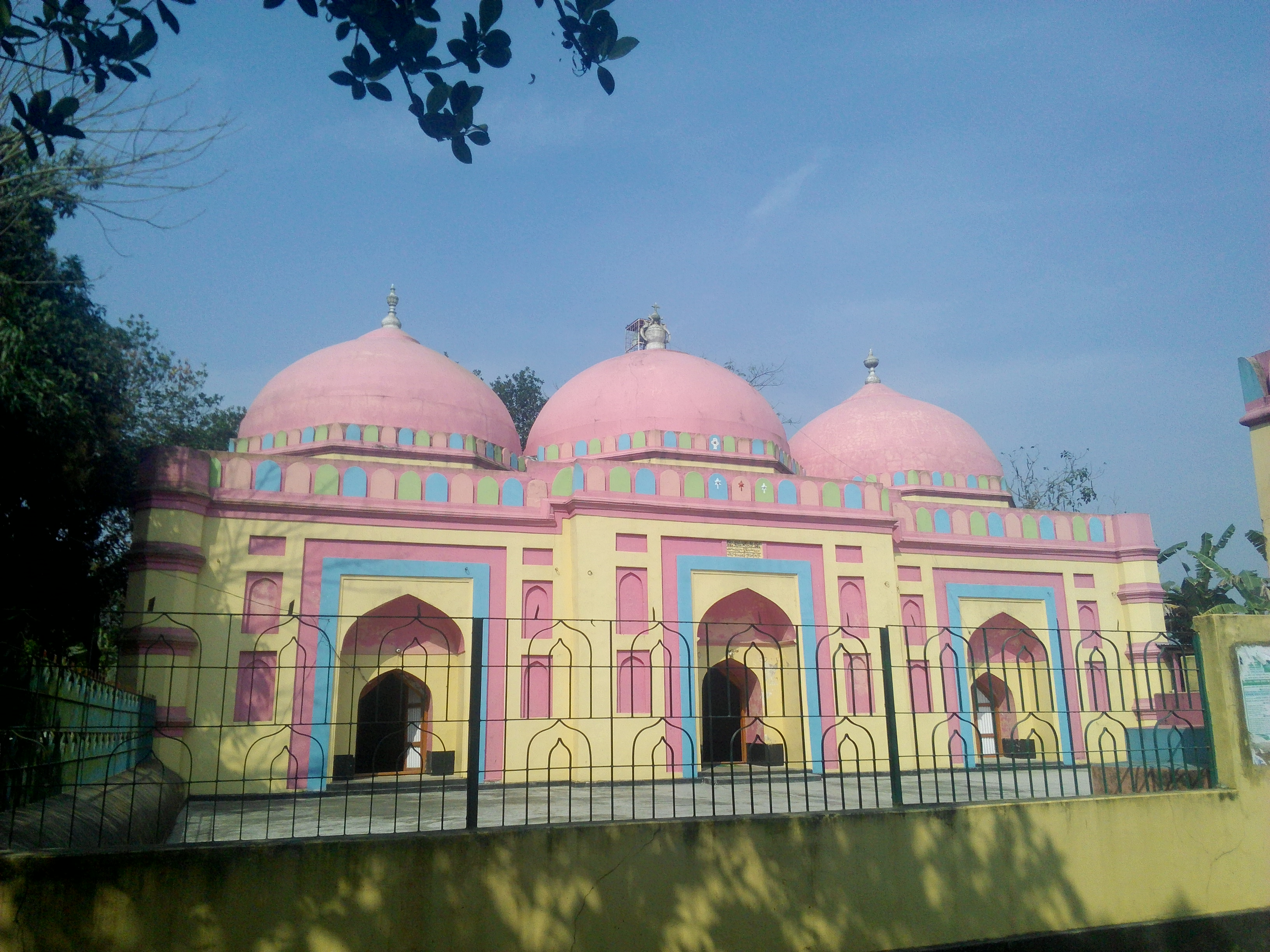

Religion
- Ownership: Government

Location
- Location: Narsingdi District, Bangladesh
- Interactive map of Parulia Shahi Mosque
- Administration: Department of Archaeology, Bangladesh

The Parulia Shahi Mosque (Bengali: পারুলিয়া শাহী মসজিদ) also known as Parulia Dewan Sharif Mosque, is a three-domed Mughal-era mosque located in Parulia village under Palash Upazila of Narsingdi Sadar, Bangladesh.

It is regarded as one of the historic architectural landmarks of the district and continues to function as an active place of worship.

== Location ==
The mosque is located approximately 10 kilometres west of Narsingdi town in Palash Upazila.

== History ==
Historical records indicate that between 1580 and 1722, the Narsingdi region was known as Maheshwardi. In 1717, Murshid Quli Khan was appointed Subahdar of Bengal and arranged the marriage of his daughter, Zaynab Bibi, to Dewan Sharif Khan, a descendant of Isa Khan. Sharif Khan was appointed Dewan of the Maheshwardi pargana, and the area later became known as Sharifpur.

According to inscriptions above the entrance of the mosque, written in Persian and Bangla, the mosque was constructed in 1128 Hijri (early 18th century CE) by Zaynab Bibi after the death of her husband, Dewan Sharif Khan. Another account states that the mosque was built in 1126 AH (1714 CE).

Large sailboats once navigated the nearby Brahmaputra River, and local residents would gather along the riverbanks to watch them. The name "Parulia" is believed to have originated from this custom.

An earthquake in 1904 caused cracks in the mosque's roof and destroyed nearby structures, including Dewan Sharif Khan's administrative residence. The mosque was renovated in 1989 and restored again in 2012.

== Architecture ==
The mosque complex includes a mausoleum, a hujurkhana (residence for religious figures), four ponds, and approximately 20 bighas of surrounding land. On the western side of the mosque and the eastern bank of one of the ponds stands a single-domed mausoleum, which houses the adjacent graves of Zaynab Bibi and Dewan Sharif Khan. Dewan Sharif Khan died in 1128 AH (1716–1717 CE), and according to her will, Zaynab Bibi was buried beside him after her death the following year. The mausoleum is now widely recognized as the shrine of Zaynab Bibi.
