= Crossfire (Bangladesh) =

Extrajudicial killings in Bangladesh

Crossfire is a form of staged extrajudicial killings in Bangladesh, often used to refer to the death of a person by gunshot while under the custody of a law enforcement agency. In March 2010, the hitherto director-general of the country's counterterrorism force Rapid Action Battalion (RAB) stated that since the unit's foundation in 2004, 622 people had been killed by RAB. The Human Rights Watch has described RAB as a Bangladeshi government death squad. Odhikar, a Dhaka-based human rights organization, reported at least 1,169 people having lost their lives in extrajudicial killings between January 2009 and May 2016. According to Odhikar, 24 people were the targets of extrajudicial killings in June 2016 alone. Human rights group Ain O Salish Kendra claims that 79 people were killed by "crossfire" while in the custody of Bangladeshi authorities in the first half of 2016. The police were involved in 37 of these deaths, of which seven had been in killed in crossfire with Detective Branch (DB) officials. In May 2018, the Bangladeshi police shot and killed 130 people as part of the 2018-2019 Bangladesh drug war.

== Overview ==
The government of Bangladesh claims that incidents of deaths by crossfire are the result of law enforcement officers acting in self-defence. The official police narrative is often presented in either of the following forms: (1) a shootout ensued after criminals opened fire on the police, or (2) armed motorists opened fire on a patrolling police team. In both instances, the deceased party got caught in the crossfire, resulting in their accidental death. However, human rights groups in Bangladesh have repeatedly disputed this version of events, having accused the country's security forces (particularly RAB) of arbitrarily abducting people, torturing them, and killing them in custody. Media in Bangladesh usually report these incidents as "crossfire" with quotation marks.

== Notable incidents ==
- Mukul Rana: In June 2016, the Detective Branch of Bangladeshi Police claimed that "Shariful" - the purported mastermind behind the 2015 murder of Avijit Roy - had been killed in a shootout between patrolling police and armed militants. However, the father of the deceased youth claimed that the boy was actually not Shariful but a student named Mukul Rana who had disappeared in February after being picked up by plainclothes police.
- Golam Faizullah Fahim: The-19-year-old youth was killed in a shootout on June 18, 2016, after being accused of critically injuring a Hindu teacher with a machete. According to the police, Fahim was killed while in custody after a group of militants opened fire on them.
- Zafar Alam, Jahangir Alam, and Dhalu Hossain: According to Bangladeshi police, the three men were notorious human traffickers who had been shot to death by police during a firefight on May 8, 2015. However, there are reports that one or two days prior to the incident the men had been picked up from their homes or local markets by the police.
- Lutfar and Khairul Khalashi: were arrested by the RAB on November 13, 2009. The following day, family members organized a press briefing in which they urged the authorities to ensure that the RAB would guarantee the brothers' safety. However, on November 16, 2009, RAB announced that both had been killed by crossfire involving a RAB patrol team earlier in the day. When the High Court of Bangladesh issued a ruling that directed the authorities to explain the deaths, a law officer at RAB headquarters denied that any shoot-out had occurred at all, contradicting the unit's previous announcement.
- Rasal Ahmed Bhutto: Bhutto was picked up by plainclothes RAB personnel on March 3, 2011, while minding a friend's shop in Dhaka. On March 10, Bhutto was tranported to his home neighborhood in a RAB vehicle, and later shot in the park. Later, RAB summoned journalists and presented them the body of an alleged criminal killed.
- Akramul Haque: RAB claimed that it had killed the 46-year-old municipality councilor Akramul Haque in a shootout between drug dealers and RAB in Teknaf on 27 May 2018. The police accused Haque of being a drug dealer and claimed that he had been carrying two firearms and thousands of methamphetamine pills on him when he was killed. However, a few days later, Akram's family released four recorded mobile phone calls between Akram and his daughter and wife before he died from a bullet wound. The recorded audio seemingly captured RAB personnel interrogating Haque before shooting him, then staging the area to look like he had gotten caught in a shootout.

== Accusations of forced confessions ==
The Detective Branch of Bangladeshi Police has been accused of threatening abducted or apprehended people with "crossfire" in order to elicit confessional statements.

== In the arts ==
Photographer Shahidul Alam organized an art exhibition called 'Crossfire', which depict a series of large images evocative of the places where victims of extrajudicial killings were murdered or discovered.

== See also ==
- Encounter killings
- Forced disappearances in Bangladesh
- Bangladesh Drug War
- Human rights in Bangladesh
- United States sanctions on Bangladesh
