= Urea Sar Karkhana School & College =

Educational Institution in Dhaka, Bangladesh

- ইউরিয়া সার কারখানা স্কুল এন্ড কলেজ
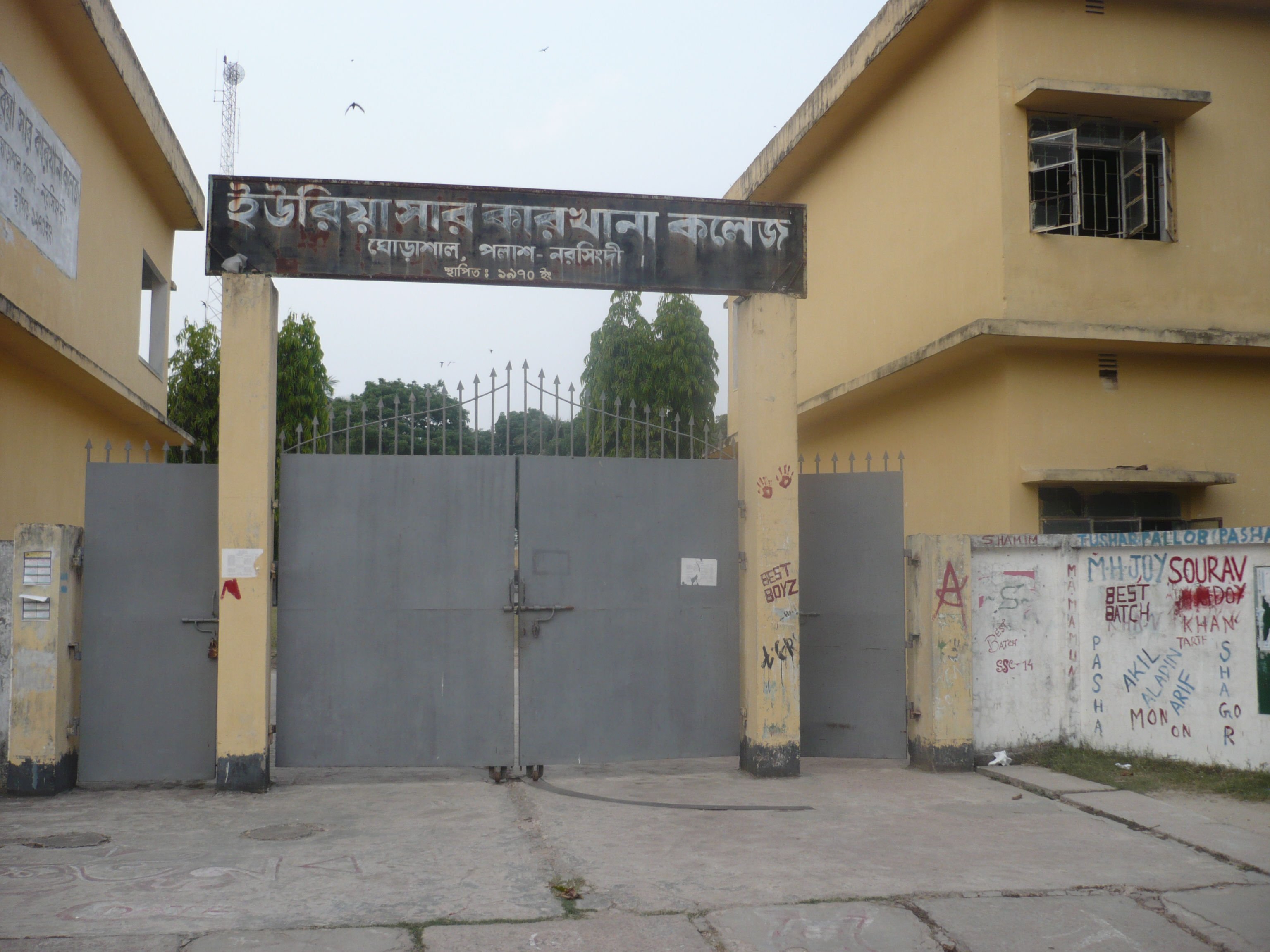
- Motto: Knowledge is power, Knowledge is light
- Type: Public
- Established: 1970
- Principal: Gausul Azam
- Academic staff: 80
- Students: 1500
- Location: Narsingdi, Dhaka, Bangladesh; 23.9854°N 90.6418°E
- Language: Bengali
- Colors: White and navy blue
- Nickname: USKC
- Website: ureasarkarkhanacollege.edu.bd

Urea Sar Karkhana School & College (USKC) is an educational institution in Narsingdi District. Urea Sar Karkhana School & College set out for 1 January 1970. It is an institution operated by Bangladesh Chemical Industries Corporation (BCIC). It is located in the Palash Upazila of Narsingdi District and inside the Colony of Urea Sar Karkhana Ltd. Boys and girls come here from very far to study. This institute has the three disciplines of science, business studies, and humanities. The Educational Institute Identification Number (EIIN) of Urea Sar Karkhana School and College is "112760".

== Administration ==
- Principal: Md. Paritosh karmokar

== Publications ==
Every year Urea Sar Karkhana School & College publishes an annual magazine called Prottasha. But some years this magazine has been stopped.

== Co-curricular activities ==
- Sports
- Cultural activities
- Scouting
- Bangladesh National Cadet Corps
