= Killing of Ekramul Haque =

Extrajudicial killing in Bangladesh

- Date: May 27, 2018
- Time: c. 12:00 AM
- Location: Teknaf Upazila, Cox's Bazar District, Bangladesh
- Type: Extrajudicial killing
- Motive: Anti-drug drive (official claim); political targeting (alleged)
- Deaths: 1

Killing of Ekramul Haque refers to the extrajudicial killing of Ekramul Haque, councillor of Teknaf Municipality Ward three, by a unit of the Rapid Action Battalion. He was elected as councilor in Teknaf Municipality three times in a row as a candidate of the Awami League. Haque was a former president of the Teknaf unit of the Jubo League, the youth wing of Awami League, for 13 years. During a Bangladesh government crackdown on the narcotics trade, the death of more than 100 suspects took place in shoot-outs with law enforcement agencies. Since 2018 more than 200 individuals were killed in extrajudicial shootings by law enforcement agencies in Teknaf alone.

On 27 May 2018, Ekramul Haque was killed in a gunfight with the Rapid Action Battalion. Major Md Ruhul Amin, company commander of Rapid Action Battalion-7, said there was a gunfight and then they found his body. They also recovered 10,000 pieces of Ya ba and two guns. Ranjit Kumar Barua, officer in charge of Tekhnaf Police Station, told the Dhaka Tribune that Haque was a listed as a drug dealer by the Ministry of Home Affairs. Haque's brother, Ehsanul Haque Bahadur, said that his brother was picked up by intelligence agents, who told him that they wanted to discuss a real estate deal. Squadron Leader Nazmus Sakib, the head of the Tekhnaf unit of the Directorate General of Forces Intelligence, was also involved in the shooting.

Lieutenant Colonel Miftah Uddin Ahmed who was commanding officer of Rapid Action Battalion-7 called Haque a "godfather of Ya ba". Major Amin said Haque was listed as a top drug dealer with the Department of Narcotics Control but the local official of Department of Narcotics Control denied knowing of any cases filed by the department against Haque. Claims of Haque being a drug dealer were denied by his wife and Jabed Iqbal Chowdhury, president of the Tekhnaf unit of the Awami League.

== Audio leak ==
A recording of the last phone call was leaked in which Haque was talking on the phone with his wife, Ayesha Begum, on 26 May 2018, one day before the reported shootout. The screaming of Haque's wife and daughters could be heard in the call. The sound of gun fire and the groaning of a man could be heard on the call. Ayesha called the killing a "pre-planned murder". She said that an intelligence officer had been pressuring Haque for help to buy a land on the Marine drive road. The claims were denied by the director of the Rapid Action Battalion's legal and media wing, Mufti Mahmud Khan.

== Reaction ==
Haque's family campaigned for justice while receiving threats from security forces. They were asked to not speak to the media. The Bangladesh government created an investigation team to look into the shooting after the audio call was leaked.

On 10 December 2021, the United States approved sanctions against seven current and former officers of the Rapid Action Battalion under the Magnitsky Act, the first Bangladeshi officials to face sanctions under the act. Those charged included Inspector General of Police Benazir Ahmed, who is also the former director general of the Rapid Action Battalion, the present director general of the Rapid Action Battalion Chowdhury Abdullah Al-Mamun, Additional Director General (operations) Colonel Khan Mohammad Azad, former additional director general (operations) Colonel Tofayel Mustafa Sorwar, former additional director general (operations) Colonel Mohammad Jahangir Alam, former additional director general (operations) Colonel Mohammad Anwar Latif Khan and Lieutenant Colonel Miftah Uddin Ahmed.
