= Saroj Kumar Nath Adhikari =

Bangladeshi Political Activist and Educationist

Saroj Kumar Nath Adhikary

Personal details
- Born: 1 January 1938
- Died: 28 August 1971 (aged 33)

Saroj Kumar Nath Adhikary (1938-1971) was a Bangladeshi educationist and political activist who was killed by the Pakistan Army in Bangladesh Liberation War; and who is viewed as a "martyr" in Bangladesh.

== Early life ==
Adhikary was born on 1 January 1938 in Mulpara, Palash, Narsingdi. He graduated from Jagannath College, Dhaka in 1960. He finished his graduate studies with a Masters in Economics in 1963, and a Masters in Accounting in 1970 from Dhaka University.

== Career ==
Adhikary started his teaching career in Gayeshpur School. After finishing his master's degree in 1963 he joined Bajitpur College as an Economics lecturer. The next year he was appointed Economics lecturer in Narsingdi College. He was involved in the communist and Bengali nationalist movements in the 1960s.

== Death and legacy ==
When the Bangladesh Liberation war started, Adhikary was arrested with fellow faculty and employees of the college on 28 August 1971 by the Pakistan Army. They were taken to the army camp at Narsingdi Telephone Exchange Building. Later that day they were killed near the Iron Bridge in Panchdona.
