= Narsingdi-2 =

Constituency of Bangladesh's Jatiya Sangsad

Coordinates: 23.98°N 90.65°E

- Constituency for the Jatiya Sangsad
- District: Narsingdi District
- Division: Dhaka Division
- Electorate: 234,373 (2018)

Current constituency
- Created: 1984
- Party: Bangladesh Nationalist Party
- Member: Abdul Moyeen Khan
- ← 199 Narsingdi-1 201 Narsingdi-3 →

Narsingdi-2 is a constituency represented in the Jatiya Sangsad (National Parliament) of Bangladesh since 2026 by Abdul Moyeen Khan of the Bangladesh Nationalist Party.

== Boundaries ==
The constituency encompasses Palash Upazila and three union parishads of Narsingdi Sadar Upazila: Amdia, Meher Para, and Panchdona.

== History ==
The constituency was created in 1984 from the Dhaka-25 constituency when the former Dhaka District was split into six districts: Manikganj, Munshiganj, Dhaka, Gazipur, Narsingdi, and Narayanganj.

Ahead of the 2008 general election, the Election Commission redrew constituency boundaries to reflect population changes revealed by the 2001 Bangladesh census. The 2008 redistricting altered the boundaries of the constituency.

Ahead of the 2014 general election, the Election Commission reduced the boundaries of the constituency. Previously it had included a fourth union parishad of Narsingdi Sadar Upazila: Silmandi.

== Members of Parliament ==
Election	Member	Party
1986	Ahmadul Kabir	Communist Party of Bangladesh
1988	Delwar Hossain Khan	Jatiya Party
1991	Abdul Moyeen Khan	Bangladesh Nationalist Party
Feb 1996	Abdul Moyeen Khan	Bangladesh Nationalist Party
Jun 1996	Abdul Moyeen Khan	Bangladesh Nationalist Party
2001	Abdul Moyeen Khan	Bangladesh Nationalist Party
2008	Anwarul Ashraf Khan	Awami League
2014	Kamrul Asraf Khan	Independent
2018	Anwarul Ashraf Khan	Awami League
2024	Anwarul Ashraf Khan	Awami League
2026	Abdul Moyeen Khan	Bangladesh Nationalist Party

== Elections ==
=== Elections in the 2020s ===
General election 2026: Narsingdi-2
Party	Candidate	Votes	%	±%
BNP	Abdul Moyeen Khan	92,352		
Jamaat	Md. Amzad Hossain	51,161		
NCP	Md. Golam Sarwar			
Majority		41,191		
Turnout				
Registered electors		286,218		
BNP gain from AL				

=== Elections in the 2010s ===
General Election 2014: Narsingdi-2
Party	Candidate	Votes	%	±%
Independent	Kamrul Asraf Khan	38,223	58.4	N/A
Jatiya Samajtantrik Dal-JSD	Zayedul Kabir	27,234	41.6	N/A
Majority		10,989	16.8	+0.5
Turnout		65,457	32.2	−56.3
Independent gain from AL				

=== Elections in the 2000s ===
General Election 2008: Narsingdi-2
Party	Candidate	Votes	%	±%
AL	Anwarul Ashraf Khan	101,687	55.6	+19.5
BNP	Abdul Moyeen Khan	71,859	39.3	−13.2
IAB	Mohashin Ahamed	8,345	4.6	N/A
Gano Forum	S. M. Altaf Hossain	595	0.3	N/A
JSD	Zayedul Kabir	389	0.2	N/A
Majority		29,828	16.3	−0.1
Turnout		182,875	88.5	+7.9
AL gain from BNP				

General Election 2001: Narsingdi-2
Party	Candidate	Votes	%	±%
BNP	Abdul Moyeen Khan	67,379	52.5	+9.7
AL	Md. Nurul Islam	46,342	36.1	+13.8
IJOF	Delwar Hossain Khan	14,292	11.1	N/A
Independent	Md. Tara Mia	161	0.1	N/A
Ganatantri Party	Abdul Hannan Bhuiyan	142	0.1	−2.4
Independent	Md. Abu Sahid Siddiqi	112	0.1	N/A
Majority		21,037	16.4	−3.9
Turnout		128,428	80.6	−0.9
BNP hold				

=== Elections in the 1990s ===
General Election June 1996: Narsingdi-2
Party	Candidate	Votes	%	±%
BNP	Abdul Moyeen Khan	45,243	42.8	−4.5
JP(E)	Azmal Kabir	23,747	22.4	−4.0
AL	Hasanul Haque	23,605	22.3	+1.1
Jamaat	Md. Helal Uddin	4,227	4.0	N/A
IOJ	Khandakar Mahiuddin	3,529	3.3	N/A
Ganatantri Party	Ahmadul Kabir	2,658	2.5	N/A
Zaker Party	Md. Sirajul Islam	1,177	1.1	−0.8
Independent	Delwar Hossain Khan	1,165	1.1	N/A
Bangladesh People's League	Md. Habibur Rahman Bhuiyan	213	0.2	N/A
Jatiya Janata Party (Nurul Islam)	Md. Helal Uddin	138	0.1	N/A
Independent	Md. Tara Miah	71	0.1	N/A
FP	Habibur Rahman Khan	28	0.0	N/A
Majority		21,496	20.3	−0.6
Turnout		105,801	81.5	+15.7
BNP hold				

General Election 1991: Narsingdi-2
Party	Candidate	Votes	%	±%
BNP	Abdul Moyeen Khan	42,851	47.3	
JP(E)	Delwar Hossain Khan	23,896	26.4	
AL	Khairul Kabir	19,203	21.2	
Zaker Party	Md. Mahbubur Rahman	1,766	1.9	
Bangladesh Muslim League (Kader)	Khandakar Mahiuddin	1,374	1.5	
JSD	Zayedul Kabir	1,033	1.1	
Jatiya Samajtantrik Dal-JSD	Md. Monirul Islam Ponir	295	0.3	
Independent	Habibur Rahman Khan	147	0.2	
Majority		18,955	20.9	
Turnout		90,565	65.8	
BNP gain from JP(E)				
