= Delwar Hossain Khan =

Bangladeshi politician (1947–2020)

Member of Bangladesh Parliament
- In office 1988–1991
- Preceded by: Ahmadul Kabir
- Succeeded by: Abdul Moyeen Khan

Bangladesh Labour Federation President

Bangladesh Institute of Labour Studies Executive Council Secretary

Personal details
- Born: 1947
- Died: 3 November 2020
- Party: Jatiya Party (Ershad)

Delwar Hossain Khan (1947 – 3 November 2020) was a Jatiya Party (Ershad) politician in Bangladesh and a former member of parliament for Narsingdi-2.

== Career ==
Khan was elected to parliament from Narsingdi-2 as a Jatiya Party candidate in 1988.

He was also president of the Bangladesh Labour Federation and executive council secretary of the Bangladesh Institute of Labour Studies.
