= Mohammad Anwar Latif Khan =

Bangladeshi military officer (born 1971)

- Born: 1 December 1971 (age 54); Bogra, East Pakistan, Pakistan
- Military career
- Allegiance: Bangladesh
- Branch: Bangladesh Army; Border Guard Bangladesh
- Service years: 09 June 1992 - 30 November 2024
- Rank: Colonel
- Unit: East Bengal Regiment
- Commands: Sector Commander of BGB; Additional Director(Operation) of Rapid Action Battalion; CO of President Guard Regiment; CO of RAB - 7; CO of RAB - 11; CO of RAB - 5; CO of 16th East Bengal Regiment
- Known for: Specially Designated Nationals
- Conflicts: UNAMSIL; UNMIS
- Police career
- Unit: Rapid Action Battalion
- Allegiance: Bangladesh
- Branch: Bangladesh Police
- Service years: 2012–2018
- Rank: Additional Director General
- Awards: BPM (BAR)

Mohammad Anwar Latif Khan BPM(BAR) psc is a retired Bangladesh Army colonel and former sector commander of Border Guard Bangladesh in Rajshahi. He is the former additional director general (operations) at the Rapid Action Battalion (RAB), an elite multi-service unit of the Bangladesh Police, and oversaw crackdowns on Islamist militants. He has been sanctioned by the United States for his activities in RAB. He had previously commanded RAB-5, RAB-7, and RAB-11.

== Early life ==
Khan was born on 1 December 1971 in Bogra District, Rajshahi Division, East Pakistan (now Bangladesh).

== Career ==
Khan received his commission in the Bangladesh Army on 9 June 1992 as part of the 26th Bangladesh Military Academy long course. He served in various units of the East Bengal Regiment and the President Guard Regiment. He also served in the 24th Infantry Division. He served in the United Nations Mission in Sierra Leone and the United Nations Mission in Sudan.

Khan served as the commanding officer (CO) of Rapid Action Battalion-7, based in Chittagong, in 2012.

Khan served as the commanding officer (CO) of Rapid Action Battalion-5 in Rajshahi in 2013–2014. He led raids against Islami Chhatra Shibir in 2013 and recovered weapons from their dorms.

On 8 March 2015, Khan was appointed the commanding officer (CO) of Rapid Action Battalion-11, based in Narayanganj. He replaced Lieutenant Colonel Tareque Sayeed Mohammad, who was dismissed from service for his role in the seven murders of the Narayanganj, a case of extrajudicial killing in which Tareque would later be convicted. He worked on improving the image of the force in Narayanganj, which had been damaged by the seven extrajudicial killings. He oversaw the investigation into the death of Tanwir Muhammad Taqi.

Khan was appointed additional director general (operations) at the Rapid Action Battalion on 28 April 2016. He was on deputation from the Bangladesh Army. He replaced Ziaul Ahsan, who had been promoted to brigadier general and made the director of the National Security Intelligence. He briefed the media following a RAB operation on 22 March 2017 in Dhaka that resulted in the arrest of five members of the militant Jamaat-ul-Mujahideen Bangladesh. In November 2017, he led operations when three alleged militants were killed in a shootout with RAB ahead of a visit by Pope Francis to Bangladesh. In 2019, he was awarded the Bangladesh Police Medal.

Khan left his post of additional director general (operations) at the Rapid Action Battalion on 17 September 2018 and was succeeded by Colonel Mohammad Jahangir Alam.

After the fall of the Sheikh Hasina-led Awami League government, Khan was detained and charged with crimes against humanity at the International Crimes Tribunal-1.

== U.S. sanctions ==
On 10 December 2021, the U.S. Department of the Treasury placed sanctions on Alam and added him to its Specially Designated Nationals (SDN) list under the Global Magnitsky Act for engaging in serious human rights abuses relating to his tenure at RAB, including the killing of Ekramul Haque.
