= Bangladesh Freedom Honour =

- Awarded for: recognition of substantial contribution in Bangladesh’s war of independence
- Country: Bangladesh
- Presented by: Government of Bangladesh
- First award: 25 July 2011

The Bangladesh Freedom Honour (Bengali: বাংলাদেশ স্বাধীনতা সম্মাননা Bānglādēśa sbādhīnatā sam'mānanā) is the highest state award given by the government of Bangladesh for foreigners or non-nationals. The award was posthumously conferred on former Indian prime minister Indira Gandhi on 25 July 2011. The award recognises her role as an ally during the Bangladesh War of Liberation and her capacity to manage such a complex regional war. A Bangladeshi national committee had nominated her for the special honour for her "unique" role in "offering training to freedom fighters and refuge to millions of people who fled the country and building world opinion for Bangladesh's independence". Indian National Congress Party president Sonia Gandhi, the daughter-in-law of Indira Gandhi, received the award from Bangladeshi President Zillur Rahman at a grand ceremony in Dhaka attended by Prime Minister Sheikh Hasina and nearly 1,000 top dignitaries.

The award included a crest weighing three kilograms is designed on 400-year-old terracotta of a 'Kadam tree' reportedly made of gold and a citation which read:

"Ms. Indira Gandhi stood by the side of the people of Bangladesh from the beginning of the Liberation War despite various adversities. She provided shelter to about one crore Bangladeshi refugees. She provided courage in the Liberation War by facing different diplomatic hurdles. She played a great role in freeing Sheikh Mujibur Rahman from Pakistani jail. Her contribution to Bangladesh's Liberation War will be remembered forever."

== Background ==
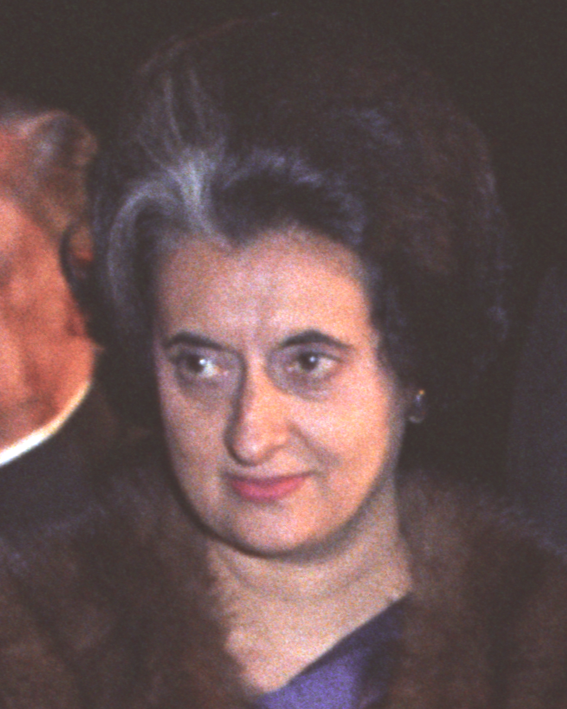
"All unprejudiced persons objectively surveying the grim events in Bangladesh since March 25 have recognized the revolt of 75 million people, a people who were forced to the conclusion that neither their life, nor their liberty, to say nothing of the possibility of the pursuit of happiness, was available to them" – written by Indira Gandhi in a letter to Richard Nixon, 15 December 1971.

During the Bangladesh Liberation War in 1971 Pakistan army conducted a widespread genocide against the Bengali population of East Pakistan, aimed in particular at the minority Hindu population, leading to approximately 10 million people fleeing East Pakistan and taking refuge in the neighbouring Indian states. The East Pakistan-India border was opened to allow refugees safe shelter in India. General Tikka Khan of Pakistan army earned the nickname 'Butcher of Bengal' because of the widespread atrocities he committed. The Indian government repeatedly appealed to the international community, but failing to elicit any response, Prime Minister Indira Gandhi on 27 March 1971 expressed full support of her government for the independence struggle of the people of East Pakistan.

The Indian leadership under Prime Minister Gandhi quickly decided that it was more effective to end the genocide by taking armed action against Pakistan than to simply give refuge to those who made it across to refugee camps. Exiled East Pakistan army officers and members of the Indian Intelligence immediately started using these camps for recruitment and training of Mukti Bahini guerrillas. The Pakistan Air Force (PAF) launched a pre-emptive strike on Indian Air Force bases on 3 December 1971. The attack was modelled on the Israeli Air Force's Operation Focus during the Six-Day War, and intended to neutralise the Indian Air Force planes on the ground. The strike was seen by India as an open act of unprovoked aggression. This marked the official start of the Indo-Pakistani War.

Six Indian corps were involved in the liberation of East Pakistan. They were supported by nearly three brigades of Mukti Bahini fighting alongside them, and many more fighting irregularly. This was far superior to the Pakistani army of three divisions. The Indians quickly overran the country, selectively engaging or bypassing lightly defended strongholds. Pakistani forces were unable to effectively counter the Indian attack, as they had been deployed in small units around the border to counter guerrilla attacks by the Mukti Bahini. Unable to defend Dacca, the Pakistanis surrendered on 16 December 1971.

== Fake gold crest controversy ==
The official blueprints specified that the crest was to feature 2.33 kilogram of 24-carat gold used to heavily coat and embellish the Kadam tree branches and the frame. But in a major investigation by the Bangladesh government in 2014 revealed that the manufacturing supplier Amecon had defrauded the Ministry of Liberation War Affairs.

Instead of 24-carat gold, the crests actually contained only about 10.11-carat gold of a significantly lower purity. The bulk of the weight was replaced with highly cheap brass, copper, and zinc alloys instead of the promised silver and gold specifications.

The manufacturer claimed the discrepancy was a misinterpretation of technical requirements, but the incident sparked a major political scandal in Dhaka.

== See also ==
- Bangladeshi honours system
- Awards and decorations of the Bangladesh Liberation War
