= Bangladesh Labour Federation =

National trade union federation in Bangladesh

- Bangladesh Labour Federation
- Headquarters: Dhaka, Bangladesh
- Location: Bangladesh
- Members: 102,000
- Affiliations: ITUC

The Bangladesh Labour Federation (BLF) is a national trade union federation in Bangladesh. It is internationally affiliated with the International Trade Union Confederation.

== History ==
Delwar Hossain Khan was president of the BLF until his death on November 3, 2020.
