= Seven Murders of the Narayanganj =

2014 murders in Bangladesh

The Seven Murders of the Narayanganj was the enforced disappearance and murder of seven people in Bangladesh, including a Panel mayor of Narayanganj City Corporation and a lawyer, in April 2014. 27 Rapid Action Battalion (RAB) members, including three top RAB 11 officials, were involved in the abduction and killing.

== History ==
Nazrul Islam, a panel mayor of Narayanganj City Corporation who was in good terms with Mayor Dr. Selina Hayat Ivy, with three associates and his driver went missing from Fatullah area of Narayanganj on 27 April 2014. His lawyer Chandan Kumar Sarker who was following the car of Nazrul Islam, also went missing on the same day with his driver from the same place. Within one week of the event, the dead bodies of the victims were seen floating on the Shitalakshya River by whose bank Narayanganj District stands. Two cases were filed in connection with the murders. Nazrul's wife Selina Islam Beauty filed a case against six people, including vice-president of Siddhirganj Awami League and Councillor Nur Hossain, while Chandan's son-in-law Bijoy Kumar Paul filed the other case against Nazmul Haque partner of an engineering firm and some unknown people. Nazrul's father-in-law Shahidul Islam alleged that Rapid Action Battalion (RAB) personnel abducted and killed Nazrul in exchange for Tk 60 million from local ward councillor Nur Hossain.

== Investigation ==
Several probe committees were formed by the government, Police and RAB. CID was given the charge to investigate the case as per the directive of the High Court while the government assigned Detective Branch of Police with the task. On 12 November 2014, the Supreme Court after hearing a petition of attorney general exempted CID from the investigation. More than a year later, on 4 June 2015, the High Court directed RAB, the government's seven-member probe committee, the inspector general of police and the CID to submit progress reports on their investigations. RAB found 21 of its members including three top officials of RAB-11 unit involved in the incident. The RAB personnel are: Hamidul Haque, Hira Miah, Belal Hossain, Abu Tayab, and Arif Hossain, all of whom are the members of RAB 11.

The three top official of RAB 11 unit Lt Colonel Tareque Sayeed, Lt Commander Masud Rana and Major Arif Hossain made confessions of their involvement in the case. All the three top officials of RAB, including Tareque Sayeed, who is the son-in-law of Food and Relief Minister Mofazzal Hossain Chowdhury were sent to forced retirement by the military forces of the country. Shahidul claimed some labourers saw RAB men and Nur Hossain, Nazmul Haque and some more civil abduct Nazrul near Shibu Market in Narayanganj on 27 April. Nur Hossain, the prime accused in the case who fled to India after the murders took place, was arrested in Kolkata on 14 June 2015. And the other one (Nazmul Haque) is missing after November 2014 in the same place in India. On 12 November 2015, the Indian government handed over Nur Hossain to Bangladesh.

== Trial and verdict ==
After years of investigation, the Detective Branch of Police pressed a charge sheet against 35 people on 8 April 2015. On 8 February 2016, after a number of hearings, the Narayanganj court indicted all the 35 names of the charge sheet for the seven murder incident. The formal trial of the case in Narayanganj began on 29 February 2016 and the process is ongoing. On 16 January 2017, a Narayanganj court awarded death penalty to 26 people including former Awami League leader Nur Hossain and 16 ex-RAB officials including Tareque Sayeed, Arif Hossain, and Masud Rana in the seven-murder case. Nine other associates of Nur Hossain and ex-RAB members were also sentenced to different terms in the verdict. The judge on his verdict, said that the charges of abduction, murder, concealing the bodies, conspiracy and destroying evidences were proved beyond any doubt.
