= Mohammad Kamrul Hasan =

Military commander in Bangladesh

Mohammad Kamrul Hasan SGP, SUP, ndc, hdmc, psc
- Alma mater: Bangladesh Military Academy
- Military career
- Allegiance: Bangladesh
- Branch: Bangladesh Army
- Service years: 1993-present
- Rank: Major General
- Unit: East Bengal Regiment
- Commands: Commander of Logistics Area; GOC of 66th Infantry Division
- Awards: Sena Gourab Padak; Sena Utkorsho Padak

Mohammad Kamrul Hasan (Note: SGP, SUP, ndc, hdmc, psc)is a Bangladeshi two-star general. He is currently serving as the area commander of the logistics area of the Bangladesh Army.

== Military career ==
Hasan was commissioned in the 28th BMA Long Course in the Corps of Infantry.

As major general, he has previously served as general officer commanding (GOC) of the 66th Infantry Division and Rangpur Area commander. Later, as part of a wider reshuffle, he was made the commander of the logistics area.
