= Palash Upazila =

Palash পলাশ
- Upazila
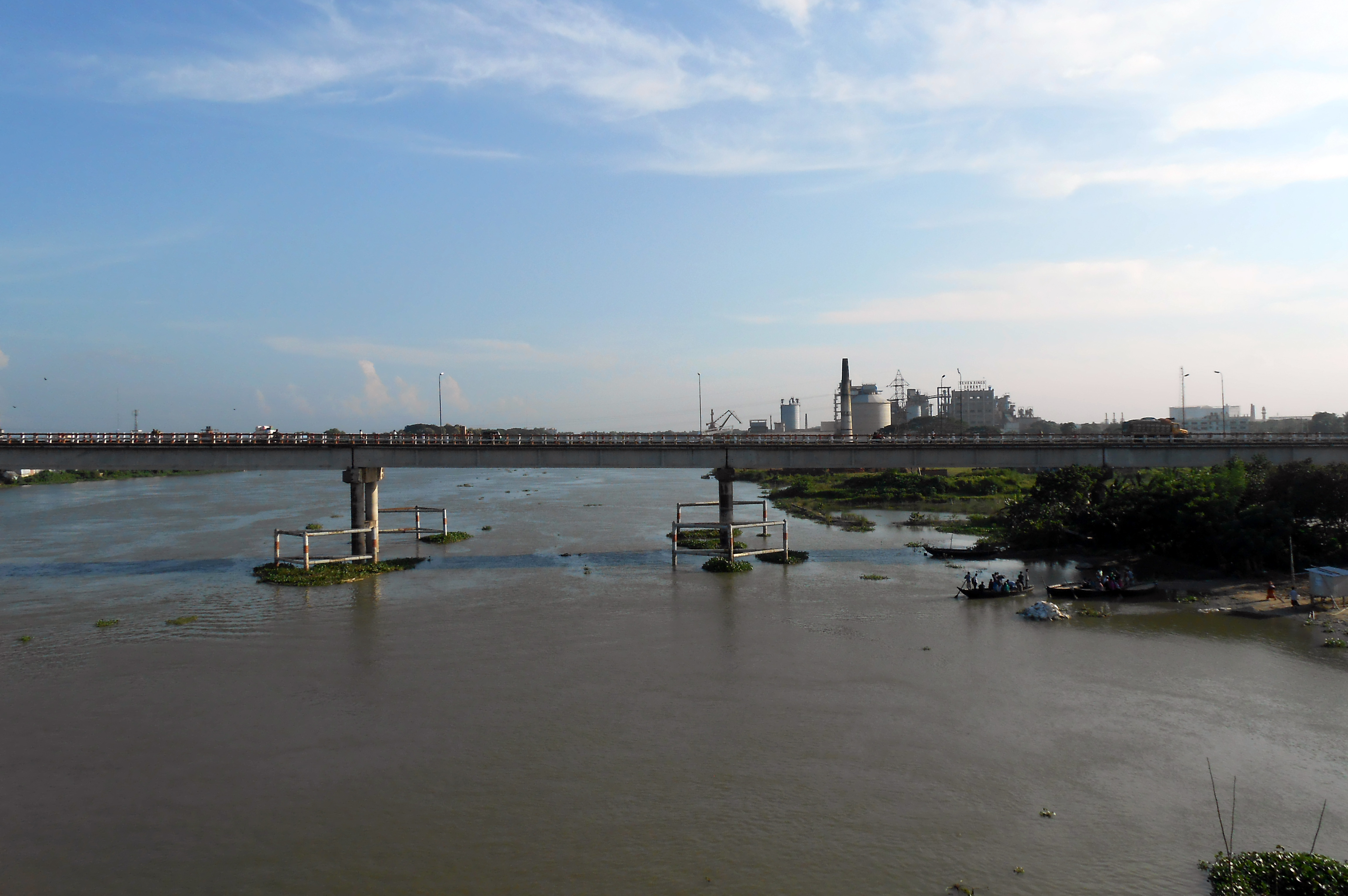
- Shaheed Moyez Uddin Bridge at Ghorashal

- Coordinates: 23°57′N 90°37.5′E
- Country: Bangladesh
- Division: Dhaka
- District: Narsingdi
- Thana: 1977
- Upazila: 1982

Government
  - Upazila Chairman: Vacant
  - MP (Narsingdi-2): Abdul Moyeen Khan

Area
  - Upazila: 94.43 km^{2} (36.46 sq mi)
  - Metro: 19.21 km^{2} (7.42 sq mi)

Population (2022)
  - Upazila: 249,156
  - Density: 2,639/km^{2} (6,834/sq mi)
- Time zone: UTC+6 (BST)
- Postal code: 1610
- Area code: 0628
- Website: palash.narsingdi.gov.bd

Palash Upazila mauza geocode map

Palash (Bengali: পলাশ, romanized: Polash) is an upazila of the Dhaka Division of Bangladesh. It is the smallest upazila (sub-district) of Narsingdi District. Urban Palash is a part of Greater Dhaka; the conurbation surrounding the Bangladeshi capital city of Dhaka.

== Geography ==
Palash is located at 23.9500°N 90.6250°E. It has a total area of 94.43 km^{2}. It borders Narsingdi Sadar to the south and Shibpur on the east and Rupganj, Kaliganj and Kapasia on the west. The Shitalakshya, Haridoa and Old Brahmaputra rivers all flow through it, totalling 60 km of river water within Palash's boundaries.

== History ==
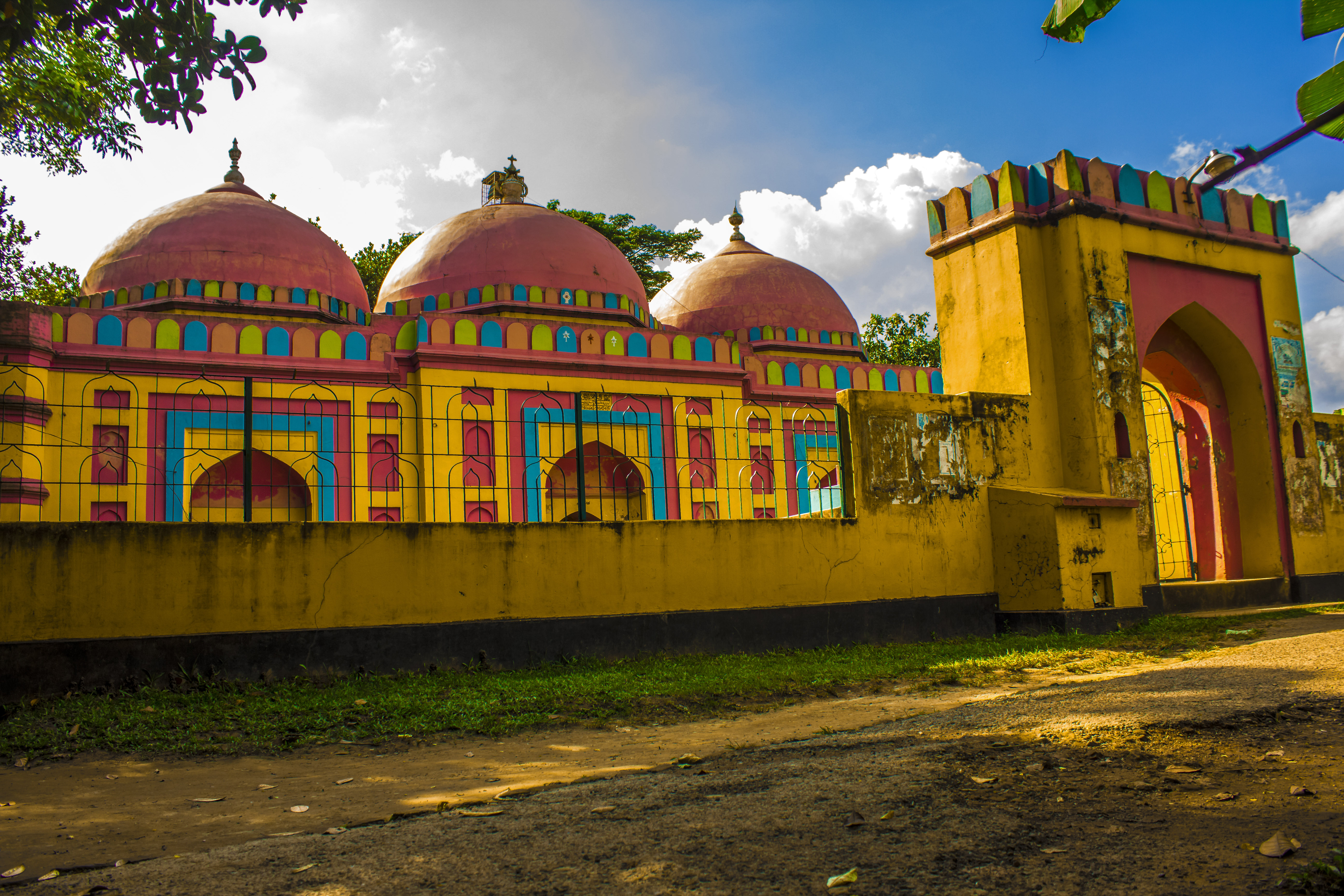
A four hundred year old mosque in Parulia

During the Mughal period, the governor of Bengal granted Diwan Sharif ibn Munawwar Khan with the zamindari of Maheswardi Pargana. Diwan was the fifth descendant of Isa Khan, and married to Bibi Zaynab. The village of Sharifpur was named after him too. In 1714, Zaynab built a three-domed mosque in Sharifpur. The Brahmaputra River used to pass through modern-day Palash, and many sailboats would pass by Sharifpur. Due to this scenery, Sharifpur became known to locals as Parulia, from pal uriya meaning flying sails in the Bengali language.

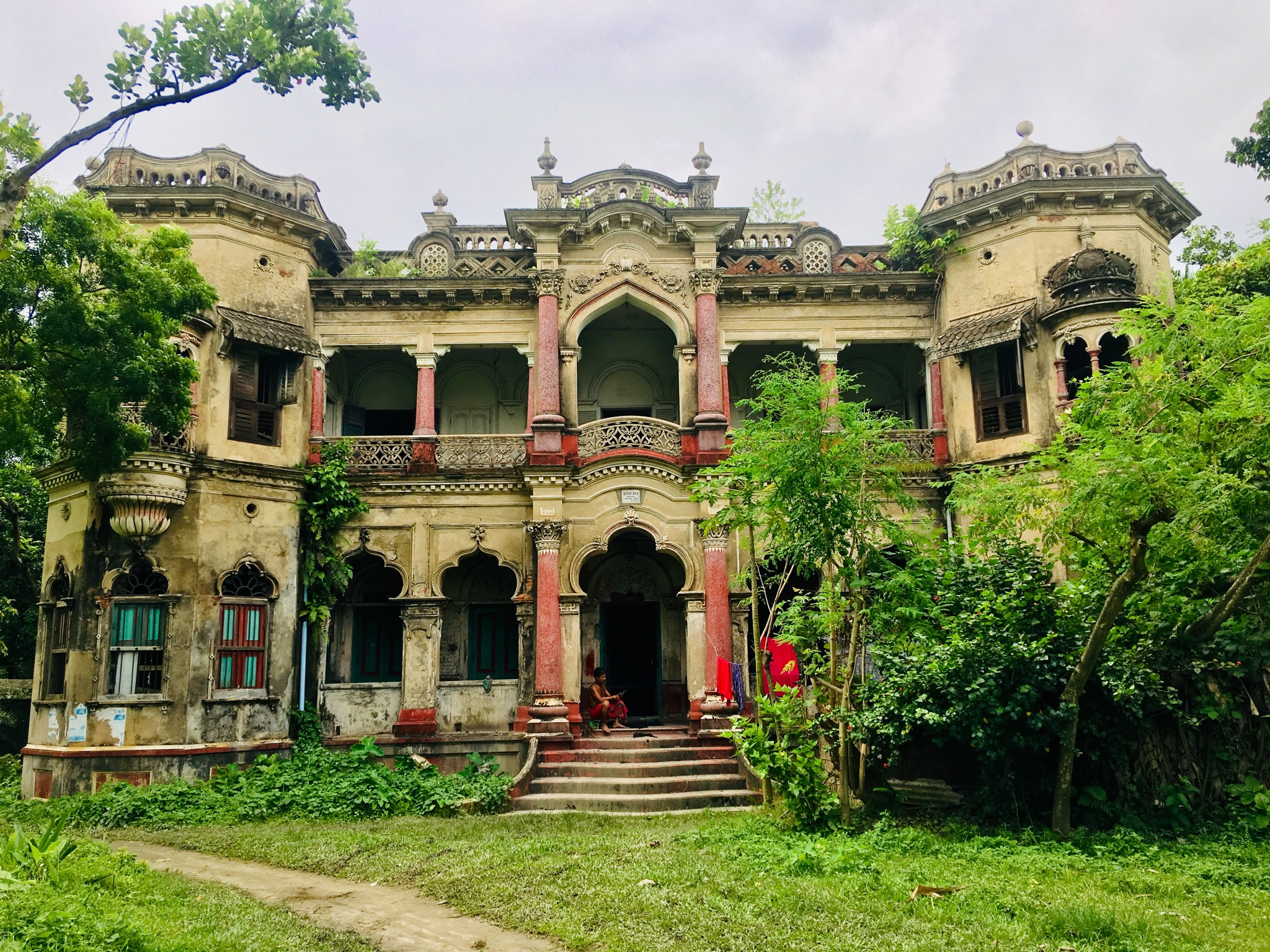
The Saha zamindar bari in Danga

During the British rule, the area suffered greatly from the 1897 earthquakes. The Muslim zamindars of Ghorasal were a notable landowning family, either founded by Ghulam Nabi or Abu Yusuf Lutful Kabir Fenu Miah. Fenu Miah's son was Manu Miah, and other notable members of the family include Najmul Hasan and Maulvi Abdul Qadir. The Hindu Sahas were another notable zamindar family, who were based in Danga. The final zamindar was Lakkhan Saha who had three sons; Nikunja Saha, Perimohan Saha and Bangku Saha. Following the Partition of India in 1947 and the Bangladesh Liberation War in 1971, Bangku and Nikunja respectively migrated to India. Perimohan inherited the land and was succeeded by his only son, Bauddha Narayana Saha who sold the estate to Ahammad Ali, a Bengali Muslim wakil. A thana (police station) was founded at Palash in 1977. In 1980, the Khilpara Darul Ulum Alim Madrasa was established through the initiative of Abdul Aziz and Shafaz Uddin.

== Demographic ==
Religions in Palash Upazila (2022)
Religion	Percent
Islam	89.06%
Hinduism	10.50%
Other or not stated	0.44%

According to the 2022 Bangladeshi census, Palash Upazila had 61,272 households and a population of 249,156. 9.17% of the population were under 5 years of age. Palash had a literacy rate (age 7 and over) of 79.35%: 81.18% for males and 77.50% for females, and a sex ratio of 101.18 males for every 100 females. 106,853 (42.89%) lived in urban areas.

According to the 2011 Census of Bangladesh, Palash Upazila had 46,780 households and a population of 212,612. 44,930 (21.13%) were under 10 years of age. Palash had a literacy rate (age 7 and over) of 58.62%, compared to the national average of 51.8%, and a sex ratio of 977 females per 1000 males. 99,680 (46.88%) lived in urban areas.

According to the official 1991 census, Palash had a population of 174,040. Males constitute 53.4% of the population, and females 46.6%. This Upazila's eighteen up population is 89627. Palash has an average literacy rate of 88.6% By 2011 that population had grown to 212,612, consisting of 46,780 households. Bengali Muslims form the majority, followed by Hindus, Buddhists and others.

== Administration ==
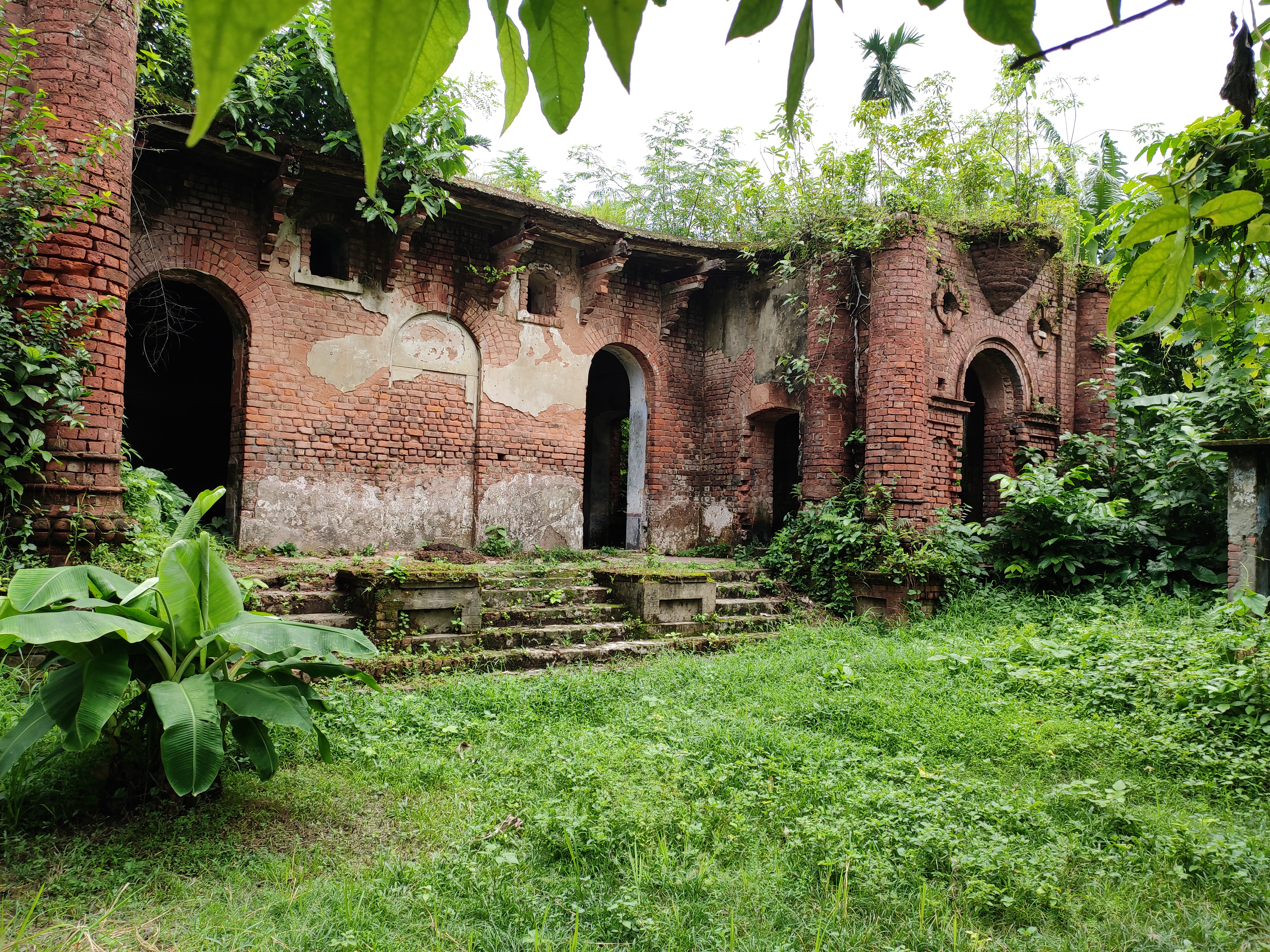
Kundu Saha's residence

Palash Upazila is divided into one municipality called Ghorasal in addition to four union parishads these are: Charsindur, Danga, Gazaria, and Jinardi. The union parishads are subdivided into 51 mauzas and 100 villages.

Ghorasal Municipality is subdivided into 9 wards and 51 mahallas.

=== Chairmen ===
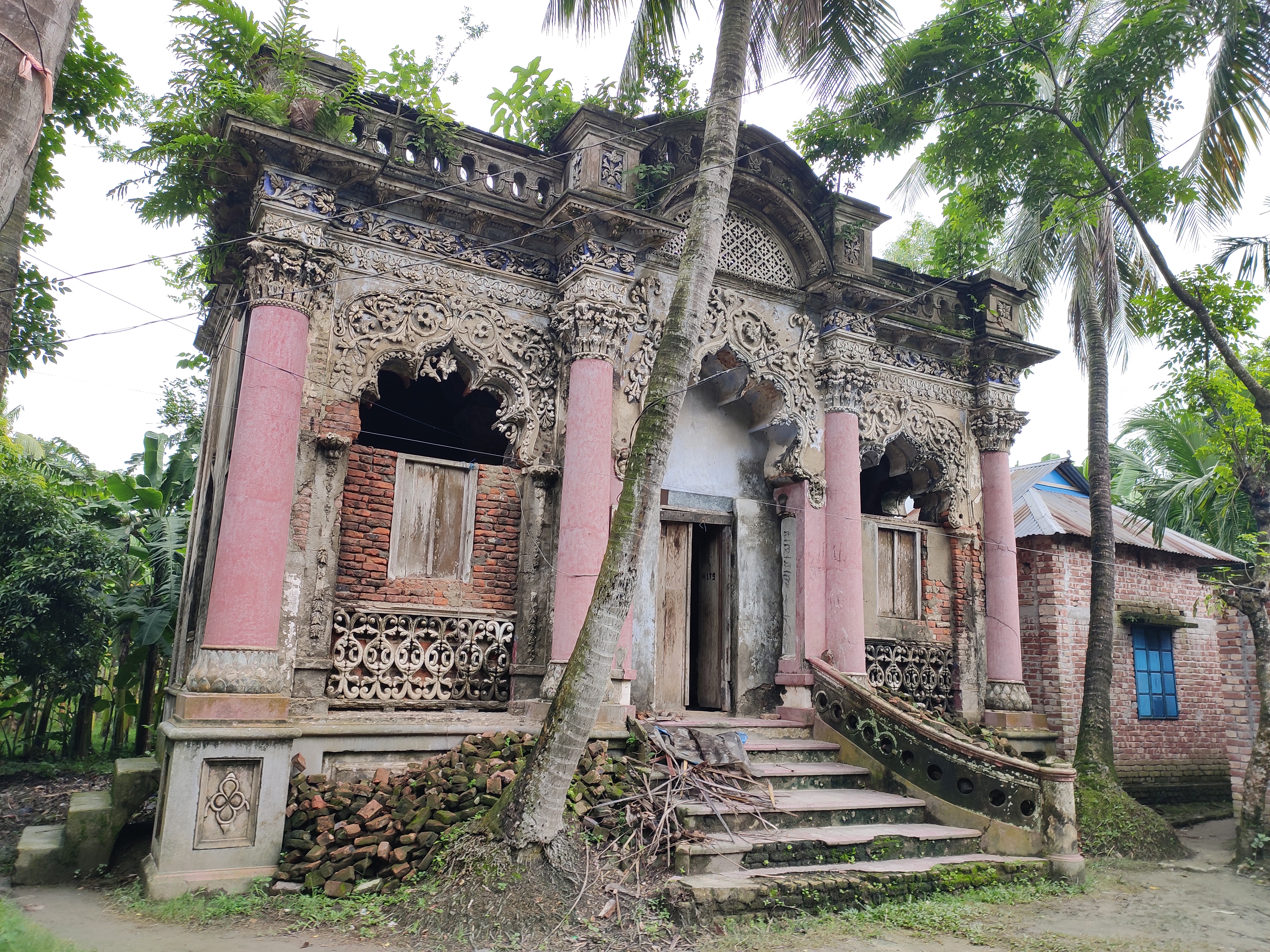
Sudan Saha's residence

List of chairmen
Number	Name
01	Professor Fazlul Haq
02	Muhammad Faruqul Islam
03	Muhammad Faruqul Islam
04	Syed Javed Husayn
05	Syed Javed Husayn

== Economy and tourism ==
With access to the Shitalakshya River, Palash has three thermal power stations; one in Siddhirganj, one north of Ghorasal and one on the river bank. There are four bazaars in Palash which are in Ghorasal, Palash Bazar, Charsindur and Danga. Other than those, there are 25 smaller haat bazaars across the upazila. Danga is famed for loom production, Charsindur for bananas, Jinardi for pineapples and Mausum for fruits in general.

Palash is home to 92 eidgahs and 407 mosques, most notably the Miah Bari Mosque in Ghorasal and the Parulia Shahi Mosque complex which also contains the tombs of the former zamindar Diwan Sharif Khan and his wife Bibi Zaynab. The palaces in Danga of the former Saha family, the residence of RR Rubel Mullah and the Ghorasal zamindar estates are also popular tourist sites.

== Infrastructure ==
The Palash Upazila has also built 6 orphanages which take care of orphan children and educate them. These include:

1. Islampara Hafizia Orphanage & Madrasa
2. Qazirchar Qaumi Orphanage & Madrasa
3. East Qazirchar Rah-e-Jannat Hafizia Orphanage & Madrasa
4. Jaynagar Dar us-Salam Orphanage & Madrasa
5. Hasanhata Nurani Hafizia Orphanage & Madrasa
6. Galimpur Hafizia Orphanage & Madrasa

== Education ==
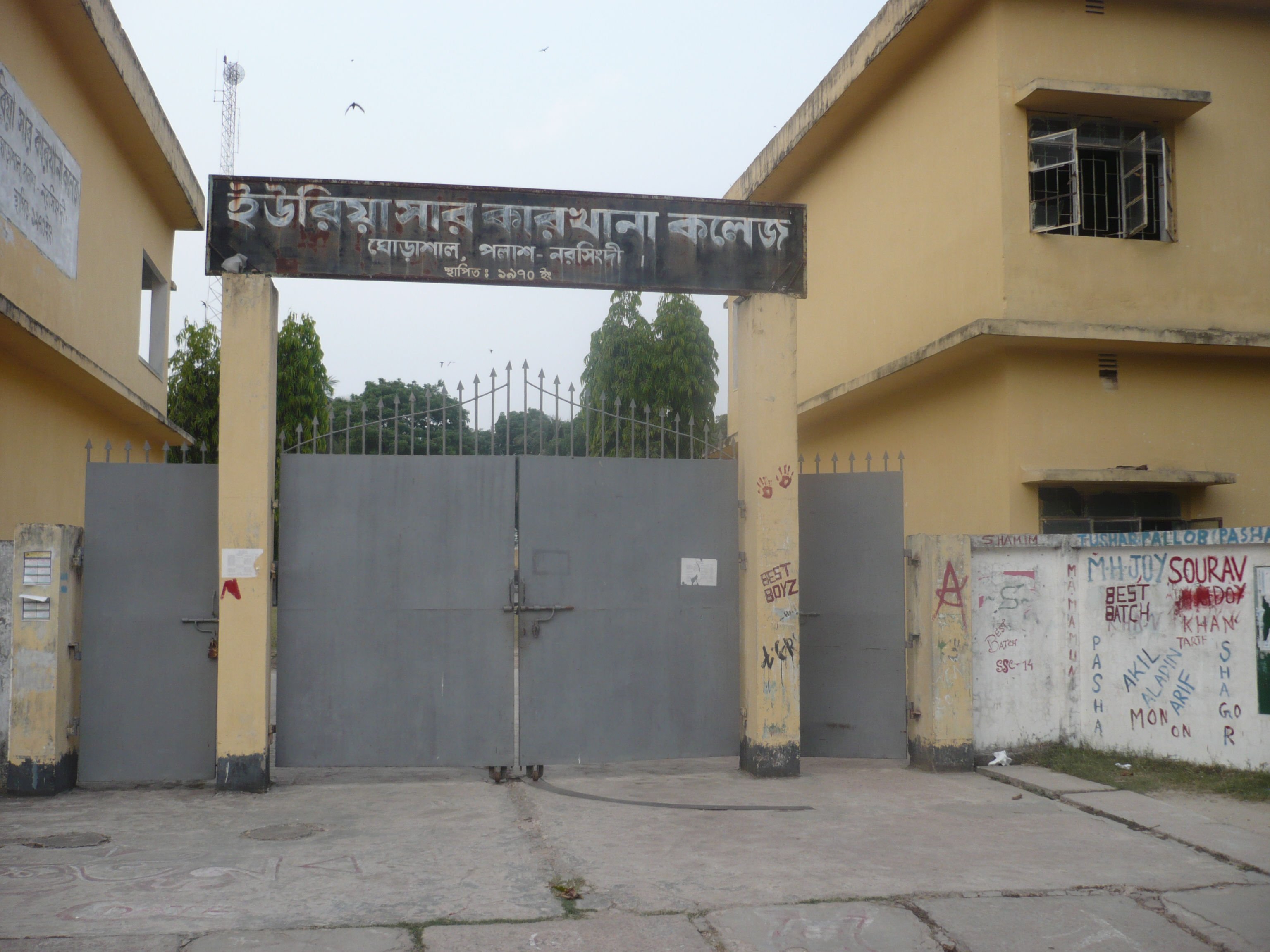
Established in January 1970, that Urea Sar Karkhana School & College is a notable institution in Palash.

There are four colleges in the upazila. They include Palash Shilpanchal College. Urea Sar Karkhana School & College is one of two higher secondary schools.

According to Banglapedia, Charsindur High School, founded in 1919, Danga High School, Gayeshpur Padmalochan High School, Ghorashal High School (1945), Palash Thana High School, and Parulia High School (1933) are notable secondary schools.

The madrasa education system includes two fazil madrasas.

Madrasas in Palash
Name	Headteacher/Principal
Danga Jamiah Ashraful Uloom Dakhil Madrasa	Muhammad Shamsul Haq
South Deora Deshgari Model Girls Dakhil Madrasa	Muhammad Abdul Karim Miah
Gazaria Madinatul Uloom Dakhil Madrasa
Kajair Islamia Dakhil Madrasa
Paikasha Dakhil Madrasa
Khilpara Darul Uloom Alim Madrasa	Muhammad Ruhul Amin Khan
Palash Islamia Alim Madrasa
Chalna Darul Ulum Fazil Degree Madrasa	Muhammad Ruhul Amin Patwari
Isakhali Fazil Degree Madrasa

== Notable people ==
- Ahmadul Kabir, politician and journalist, was born in Ghorashal town in 1923.
- Haripada Datta, novelist
- Saroj Kumar Nath Adhikari, educationist

== See also ==
- Upazilas of Bangladesh
- Districts of Bangladesh
- Divisions of Bangladesh
