= Khan Mohammad Azad =

Bangladeshi brigadier general

- Born: 15 October 1974 (age 52); Barisal, Khulna Division, Bangladesh
- Military career
- Allegiance: Bangladesh
- Branch: Bangladesh Army
- Service years: 1995 – present
- Rank: Colonel
- Unit: Bangladesh Infantry Regiment
- Commands: CO of 25th Bangladesh Infantry Regiment; CO of RAB - 7; Additional Director(Operation) of Rapid Action Battalion
- Known for: Specially Designated Nationals; Killing of Ekramul Haque
- Conflicts: MONUSCO
- Police career
- Unit: Rapid Action Battalion
- Allegiance: Bangladesh
- Branch: Bangladesh Police
- Service years: 2009–2022
- Rank: Additional Director General
- Awards: Bangladesh Police Medal (Bravery)

Khan Mohammad Azad (Note: BPM psc) (also known as KM Azad; born 15 October 1974) is a Bangladesh Army colonel who served as the additional director general (operations) at the Rapid Action Battalion (RAB) — the elite multiservice, anti-crime, and anti-terrorism unit of the Bangladesh Police.

== Career ==
Azad received his commission from the Infantry Division of the Bangladesh Army through the Bangladesh Military Academy (BMA) Long Course. He worked as the battalion commander at the Bangladesh Infantry Regimental Centre (BIR), in the position of colonel. Earlier in his career, he had served as operation wing director at RAB headquarters at Kurmitola and as commanding officer of the RAB-7 field unit in Chittagong.

Azad re-joined RAB on deputation from the Bangladesh Army on 9 March 2021. He was subsequently appointed additional director general (operations) of the RAB on 16 March 2021, replacing Colonel Tofayel Mustafa Sorwar. Colonel Kamrul Hasan replaced Azad as additional director general (operations) of the RAB in June 2022.

After the fall of the Sheikh Hasina-led Awami League government, Azad was detained and charged with crimes against humanity at the International Crimes Tribunal-1.

== U.S. sanctions ==
On 10 December 2021, the U.S. Department of the Treasury added Azad to its Specially Designated Nationals (SDN) list under the Global Magnitsky Act for engaging in serious human rights abuses relating to his tenure at the RAB.
