= National Youth Awards (Bangladesh) =

The National Youth Awards are conferred annually by the Ministry of Youth and Sports of the Government of Bangladesh to high-achieving men and women from all over the country. These awards are conferred every year on the eve of National Youth Day on 1 November.
