= Abdul Moyeen Khan =

Bangladeshi politician

- আব্দুল মঈন খান
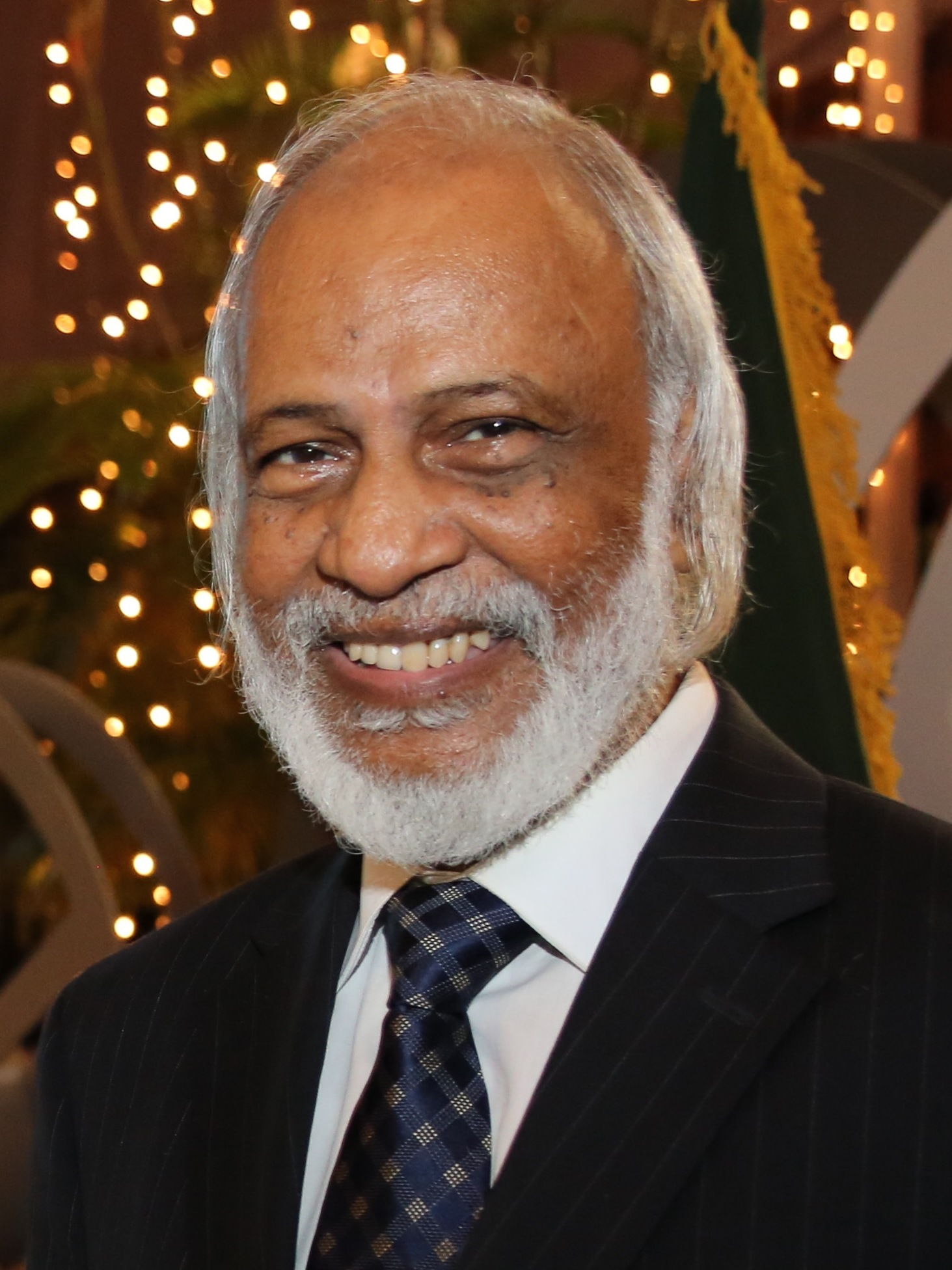
- Khan at US Embassy Dhaka on 4 July 2018

Minister of Local Government, Rural Development and Co-operatives
- Incumbent
- Assumed office 21 August 2026
- Prime Minister: Tarique Rahman
- Preceded by: Mirza Fakhrul Islam Alamgir

Member of Parliament
- Incumbent
- Assumed office 17 February 2026
- Preceded by: Anwarul Ashraf Khan
- Constituency: Narsingdi-2
- In office 5 March 1991 – 27 October 2006
- Preceded by: Delwar Hossain Khan
- Succeeded by: Anwarul Ashraf Khan
- Constituency: Narsingdi-2

Minister for Information
- In office 10 October 2001 – 11 March 2002
- Prime Minister: Khaleda Zia
- Preceded by: Abdul Muyeed Chowdhury
- Succeeded by: Tariqul Islam

Minister for Science and Information & Communication Technology
- In office 12 March 2002 – 29 October 2006
- Prime Minister: Khaleda Zia
- Preceded by: Lutfor Rahman Khan Azad
- Succeeded by: Sultana Kamal

Minister of State for Planning
- In office 13 September 1993 – 27 March 1996
- Prime Minister: Khaleda Zia
- Preceded by: A. M. Zahiruddin Khan
- Succeeded by: Wahiduddin Mahmud

Personal details
- Born: 1 January 1947 (age 79) Narsingdi District, East Bengal
- Party: Bangladesh Nationalist Party
- Parent: Abdul Momen Khan (father)
- Education: Notre Dame College, Dhaka; University of Sussex

Abdul Moyeen Khan (born 1 January 1947) is a Bangladesh Nationalist Party politician. He is the incumbent Minister for Local Government, Rural Development and Co-operatives since August 2026. He is a member of the current standing committee of the party. He served as the minister of state for planning, government of Bangladesh during 1993–1996, minister of information during 2001–2002 and the minister of science and information & communication technology (now renamed) during 2002–2006. He served as a member of the Bangladesh Parliament from 1991 until 2006.

== Early life ==
Khan is the son of Abdul Momen Khan, formerly the top civil servant in Bangladesh (cabinet secretary) and a former Bangladesh Nationalist Party (BNP) politician, a founder member of BNP and the minister of food in the cabinet of President Ziaur Rahman.

Khan completed his Higher Secondary education from Notre Dame College, Dhaka and graduated as a PhD from the University of Sussex in 1973.

== Career ==
Khan was a professor of physics in the University of Dhaka until 1991 when he first successfully ran for the fifth parliament in 1991 and was elected the MP for Narsingdi-2 constituency. He received 42,851 votes while his nearest rival, Delwar Hossain Khan of the Jatiya Party, received 23,896 votes.

Khan was re-elected to parliament in June 1996 as a candidate of Bangladesh Nationalist Party from Narsingdi-2. He received 45,243 votes while his nearest rival, Azmal Kabir of the Jatiya Party, received 23,747 votes. In 1998, Khan was included in the parliamentary standing committee on planning ministry.

Khan was re-elected to parliament in 2001 as a candidate of Bangladesh Nationalist Party from Narsingdi-2. He received 67,379 votes while his nearest rival, Md. Nurul Islam of the Awami League, received 46,342 votes. Khan was the minister of science, information and communications technology in the third Khaleda Zia cabinet.

Khan contested the 2008 election from Narsingdi-2 as a candidate of the Bangladesh Nationalist Party but lost to Anwarul Ashraf Khan of the Awami League. He had received 71,859 votes while the winner received 101,687 votes. In December 2009, Khan became a member of BNP's standing committee, the highest policy planning body of the party. Palash Upazila unit of Bangladesh Nationalist Party organized a reception for him. The Swechhasebak League declared a program at the same location for Victory Day. The local administration declared Section 144 and attacked the Bangladesh Nationalist Party men at the venue to disperse them.

Khan met with diplomats from 15 foreign countries in December 2015 at the political office of former Prime Minister Khaleda Zia in Gulshan. He briefed the diplomats on the recent municipal elections in Bangladesh. The Bangladesh Nationalist Party were participating in the municipal elections after boycotting the general election in 2014.

Khan secured bail from Bangladesh High Court along with other Bangladesh Nationalist Party leaders in October 2018 in a case filed for "provoking people against the state". On 16 December 2018, Khan's motorcade was attacked in Palash Upazila, Narsingdi District injuring 50. He was the candidate of the Bangladesh Nationalist Party for Narsingdi-2. He lost to Anwar Ul Ashraf Khan of the Awami League, who receive 175,711 votes, while Moyeen Khan received 7,180 votes.

After the 2024 Bangladeshi general election, Khan predicted the Sheikh Hasina led government would be forced to resign. The election was boycotted by the Bangladesh Nationalist Party. He had described the Awami League government as more dangerous than a dictatorship due to its pretense of democracy.
