= Mohammad Kamrul Hassan =

Mohammad Kamrul Hasan
- Born: 12 March 1975 (age 51)
- Military career
- Allegiance: Bangladesh
- Branch: Bangladesh Army; Border Guard Bangladesh
- Service years: June 1996 – present
- Rank: Colonel
- Unit: Regiment of Artillery
- Commands: CO of 19th Medium Artillery Regiment; CO of RAB - 10; CO of RAB - 11; CO of 58th Border Guard Battalion; Additional Director(Operation) of Rapid Action Battalion; Colonel Staff of 19th Infantry Division
- Known for: Specially Designated Nationals
- Conflicts: UNAMID
- Police career
- Unit: Rapid Action Battalion
- Allegiance: Bangladesh
- Branch: Bangladesh Police
- Service years: 2012–2023
- Rank: Additional Director General

Md Kamrul Hassan is a Bangladesh Army officer and former additional director general of operations of the Rapid Action Battalion.

== Career ==
In 2012, Hasan was the commanding officer of the Rapid Action Battalion-10. In 2013, he was part of the management committee of the 8th Bangladesh Games.

From 2013 to 2014, Hasan served as the operational officer of the Bangladeshi contingent of the United Nations–African Union Mission in Darfur. He served as defence advisor at the Bangladesh High Commission in India. From 10 June 2015 to 20 December 2016, Hasan was the member secretary of the Army Golf Club. He had replaced Lieutenant Colonel Md Mahbubul Islam and was replaced by Lieutenant Colonel Muhammad Nurul Kabir.

As the commanding officer of the Rapid Action Battalion-11, Hasan detained Islamist terrorists of Neo JMB's Sarwar-Tamim group. He detained suspected terrorists from Narsingdi District. He detained eight suspected members of Jama'atul Mujahideen Bangladesh from Narayanganj District and Comilla District. His unit investigated the murder of Tanwir Muhammad Taqi.

In May 2021, Hasan was the director of the 58th battalion of Border Guard Bangladesh.

Hasan was promoted to colonel and appointed as additional director general of operations of the Rapid Action Battalion in June 2022, replacing Colonel KM Azad. On 10 December 2021, the U.S. Department of the Treasury added Azad to its Specially Designated Nationals (SDN) list under the Global Magnitsky Act for engaging in serious human rights abuses relating to his tenure at RAB.

In May 2023, Hasan was replaced by Colonel Mahbub Alam as additional director general of operations of the Rapid Action Battalion, according to Commander Khandaker Al Moin, as he returned to the Bangladesh Army.

After the fall of the Sheikh Hasina-led Awami League government, Hasan was detained and charged with crimes against humanity at the International Crimes Tribunal-1.
