= Tareque Sayeed =

Bangladeshi Army officer convicted in the Narayanganj Seven murder case

Mohammad Tareque Sayeed
- Military career
- Allegiance: Bangladesh
- Branch: Bangladesh Army
- Service years: 1991–2014
- Rank: Lieutenant Colonel
- Unit: Bangladesh Infantry Regiment
- Commands: CO of RAB - 11; CO of 4th Bangladesh Infantry Regiment
- Known for: Seven Murders of the Narayanganj
- Police career
- Unit: Rapid Action Battalion
- Allegiance: Bangladesh
- Branch: Bangladesh Police
- Service years: 2011–2014
- Rank: Director

Tareque Sayeed Mohammad (Bengali: মোহাম্মদ তারেক সাঈদ) is a former Bangladeshi military officer who was convicted in the Narayanganj Seven murder case. He was the commanding officer of the elite force Rapid Action Battalion (RAB)-11.

He is the son-in-law of former minister Mofazzal Hossain Chowdhury.

== Murder conviction ==
Seven people, including Narayanganj City Corporation Panel Mayor Nazrul Islam, senior lawyer Chandan Sarker, their two drivers, and three associates, were abducted from the Dhaka–Narayanganj link road on 27 April 2014. Three days later, their bodies were found floating in the river Shitalakkhya. Rapid Action Battalion (RAB) involvement in the killings came to light when Nazrul's father-in-law, Shahidul Islam, alleged that RAB personnel had abducted and killed Nazrul in exchange for ৳60 million from Narayanganj Ward Councillor Nur Hossain and his aides.

Tareque Sayeed, Major Arif Hossain, Lt Commander Masud Rana, Awami League leader Nur Hossain, and 22 others were found guilty and received the death penalty. Nine other accused were sentenced to between 7 and 17 years in prison.

== Further accusations ==
Tareque Sayeed became the commanding officer of RAB-11 on 3 November 2013. Arif Hossain joined RAB-11 on 1 February 2013, and Rana joined RAB-11 on 2 July 2013. Sayeed and RAB-11 have been accused of abduction and killings in at least a dozen cases, including:

- Ismail Hossain – RAB-11 and Tareque Sayeed are accused in the abduction of businessman Ismail Hossain, who has been missing since 7 February 2014.
- Hasan Shaon – Comilla Jubo League leader Rakibul Hasan Shaon was abducted from his home on 29 March 2014 and is still missing. Shaon is the son of a freedom fighter; his mother filed a case in court against 15 RAB men.
- Moslem Uddin – Chatkhil Thana (Noakhali) Jubo League leader Moslem Uddin was abducted from a crowded bus in front of his wife by RAB men on 9 April 2014 and is still missing.
- Tajul Islam – RAB-11 was accused of abducting businessman Tajul Islam in a Hi-ace microbus on 17 February 2013. Tajul's dead body was found in the Meghna River 13 days later.
- Kalam Sikder – RAB-11 was accused of abducting Kalam Sikder in relation to the Twaki murder case in Narayanganj; he has not been arrested.
- Saiful Islam Hiru and Kabir Parvez – On 27 November 2013, former Bangladesh Nationalist Party (BNP) lawmaker Saiful Islam Hiru and BNP leader Humayun Kabir Parvez were abducted while going to Comilla from Laksham. They have not been found.
- Iqbal Mahmud Jewel – Under Tareque Sayeed's command, RAB-11 was accused of burning 2 cars and killing Iqbal Mahmud Jewel in front of BNP leader Sahab Uddin Sabu in Lakshmipur on 23 December 2013.
- Dr. Foyez Ahmed – Under Tareque Sayeed's command, RAB-11 was accused of killing Jamaat leader Foyez Ahmed by throwing him off the roof of a 2-story building.
- Shahadat Hossain Jasu, Jabed and Suman – On 3 and 5 April 2014, RAB-11 claimed three robbers, Shahadat Hossain Jasu, Jabed, and Suman, had been killed by them in crossfire in Urirchor, Noakhali. RAB claimed to have seized arms and ammunition, which they were unable to produce.

== See also ==
- Crossfire (Bangladesh)
- Forced disappearance in Bangladesh
- Human rights in Bangladesh
