= Charles Whiteley =

English footballer

Personal information
- Date of birth: 1885
- Place of birth: Burnley, England
- Position: Winger

Senior career*
Years	Team	Apps	(Gls)
1905–1907	Burnley	3	(0)
- * Club domestic league appearances and goals

Charles Whiteley (born 1885) was an English professional footballer who played as a winger.
