= Tofayel Mustafa Sorwar =

Bangladeshi military officer (born 1973)

- Born: 7 December 1973 (age 52); Sunamganj, Chittagong Division, Bangladesh
- Military career
- Allegiance: Bangladesh
- Branch: Bangladesh Army
- Service years: 1994-2024
- Rank: Brigadier General
- Unit: Bangladesh Infantry Regiment
- Commands: Station Commander, Savar; Commander of 88th Infantry Brigade; Additional Director General (Operation) of Rapid Action Battalion
- Conflicts: MONUSCO; UNMIL; MINUSMA
- Police career
- Unit: Rapid Action Battalion
- Allegiance: Bangladesh
- Branch: Bangladesh Police
- Service years: 2019–2021
- Rank: Additional Director General
- Awards: Bangladesh Police Medal (Service)

Tofayel Mustafa Sorwar, BPMS, psc is a Bangladesh Army brigadier general and the former additional director general (operations) at the Rapid Action Battalion (RAB), an elite multi-service unit of the Bangladesh Police. He has been sanctioned by the U.S. Department of the Treasury for human rights violations at RAB during his time at the agency.

== Early life ==
Sorwar was born on 7 December 1973 in Sunamganj District, Bangladesh (now in Sylhet Division).

== Career ==
Sorwar was commissioned on the 31st BMA Long Course of Bangladesh Military Academy on 19 December 1994.

Sorwar previously served in the Directorate General of Forces Intelligence and Army Intelligence. He had also served in the Chittagong Hill Tracts and commanded an infantry battalion.

On 29 June 2019, Sorwar was promoted to colonel and appointed the additional director general (operations) at the Rapid Action Battalion, replacing Colonel Mohammad Jahangir Alam. He previously served as the deputy commander of Bangladeshi Battalion-5 of MONUSCO in the Congo. He had served in the Bangladeshi Battalion-4 in the United Nations Mission in Liberia and the Bangladeshi Battalion-5 in the United Nations Multidimensional Integrated Stabilization Mission in Mali.

On 30 July 2019, Sorwar was part of the Bangladesh delegation that went to the 1769th Meeting of the 67th Session of the Committee Against Torture titled Consideration of Bangladesh. The committee called for an investigation into allegations of human rights violations by the RAB. On 18 September 2019, Sorwar sought permission from the Ministry of Home Affairs to go to Canada to purchase a backpack IMSI-catcher, a mass surveillance device, along with Md. Jahangir Alam, joint secretary of the Public Security Division. On 26 October 2020, he oversaw the detention of Erfan Selim, son of member of parliament Haji Mohammad Salim. He also saw the creation of an app that tracked COVID-19 infections of RAB members during the COVID-19 pandemic in Bangladesh. He oversaw the investigation of the murder of Major Sinha Mohammed Rashed Khan. The accused in the Major Sinha murder case alleged he was tortured by Sorwar in custody. He oversaw the arrest of Salim Prodhan.

On 16 March 2021, Colonel Khan Mohammad Azad replaced Sorwar as the additional director general (operations) at the Rapid Action Battalion. He was promoted to the rank of brigadier general. He currently the station commander of Savar Cantonment and the president of the Cantonment Board. He is the chairperson of the Development Committee of Savar Golf Club.

== U.S. sanctions ==
On 10 December 2021, the U.S. Department of the Treasury added Sorwar to its Specially Designated Nationals list (SDN) under the Global Magnitsky Act for engaging in serious human rights abuses relating to his tenure at RAB. He was one of seven serving and former officers of RAB to be sanction by the United States.
