= Kamrul Hasan Bhuiyan =

Kamrul Hassan Bhuiyan
- কামরুল হাসান
- Born: 24 July 1952; Comilla, East Bengal, Pakistan
- Died: 6 August 2018 (aged 66); Dhaka, Bangladesh
- Alma mater: Beijing Language and Culture University
- Military career
- Allegiance: Bangladesh
- Branch: Bangladesh Army
- Service years: 1975 - 1988
- Rank: Major
- Unit: East Bengal Regiment
- Commands: 2IC of 4th East Bengal Regiment; DQ of 46th Independent Infantry Brigade; Sub-Commander of Sector – II
- Conflicts: Bangladesh Liberation War
- Awards: Bangla Academy Award, 2017

Kamrul Hassan Bhuiyan (24 July 1952 – 6 August 2018) was a Bangladeshi major in the Bangladesh Army. He was a freedom fighter, liberation war researcher and writer. He was the founder chairman of the Center for Liberation War Studies. He received Bangla Academy Award in the year 2018 for his contribution to the liberation war literature.

== Early life and education ==
Bhuiyan was born on 24 July 1952 in Comilla district. He studied at Jessore Zilla School and Jhenaidah Cadet College. He graduated in China in 1983 from Beijing Language and Culture University.

== Career ==
Bhuiyan was a HSC examinee in 1971. When the Bangladesh Liberation War started, he joined the war. He fought under Sector 2 of the War of Liberation.

Bhuiyan joined the Bangladesh Army on 9 January 1974. On 11 January 1975 he was commissioned in the 4th East Bengal Regiment as a second lieutenant.

== Published books ==
Among his published books, the number of books on liberation war is 23, one is written on military history and three children's books. Among them, the books on liberation war are:

- Jonojudder Gonojodda
- Bijoye Hoye Firbo Naile Firbo Na
- Dui No sector Abong K fource Commender Khaleder Kotha (Edited)
- Ekattorer Konna, Jaya, Janonira
- Potakar Proti Pronodona
- Muktijodde Sishu-kishorder Obodan
- Ekattorer Dinponji

== Death ==
Bhuiyan died at the Combined Military Hospital (CMH) of Dhaka on 6 August 2018. He was suffering from diabetes and kidney related complications.
