= Mohammad Jahangir Alam =

Bangladeshi general (born 1973)

- Born: 19 October 1973 (age 52); Dinajpur, Rajshahi, Bangladesh
- Military career
- Allegiance: Bangladesh
- Branch: Bangladesh Army
- Service years: 1993 - 2024
- Rank: Brigadier General
- Unit: East Bengal Regiment
- Commands: Commander of 309th Infantry Brigade; Commander of President Guard Regiment; Commander of 203rd Infantry Brigade; Additional Director General (Operation) of Rapid Action Battalion
- Conflicts: UNIKOM
- Police career
- Unit: Rapid Action Battalion
- Allegiance: Bangladesh
- Branch: Bangladesh Police
- Service years: 2018–2019
- Rank: Additional Director General
- Awards: BPM (bar)

Mohammad Jahangir Alam is a one star officer of Bangladesh Army and former commander of the President Guard Regiment. Alam served in the Rapid Action Battalion and became one of seven officers of the force to be sanctioned by the United States for violation of human rights for his involvement in extrajudicial killings and enforced disappearances in Bangladesh. Alam is also one of the officers detained by the Bangladesh Army because of crimes against humanity by the International Crimes Tribunal of Bangladesh after the July Revolution and is currently in custody pending legal proceedings.

== Early life and education ==
Alam was born on 10 October 1973 in Dinajpur District, Bangladesh. He enlisted in the Bangladesh Military Academy in 1991 and was commissioned in the East Bengal Regiment on 19 December 1993. He completed his master's degree in defense studies from the Bangladesh University of Professionals. Alam is a graduate of Defence Services Command and Staff College and the Armed Forces War College and furthermore trained in counter terrorist tactics in the United States.

== Military career ==
Alam commanded one infantry battalion of 17th Infantry Division and served as a platoon commander in the Bangladesh Military Academy. In October 2018, Alam, then lieutenant colonel, hosted the seventh annual Pacific Resilience Disaster Response Exercise and Exchange between Bangladesh Army and U.S. Army Pacific. He served on deputation with the Kuwaiti Army for three years. Alam was promoted on 11 January 2017 to colonel and appointed to the 19th Infantry Division, based at Shahid Salahuddin Cantonment, as the division colonel staff. Alam was appointed the additional director general (operations) at the Rapid Action Battalion on 17 September 2018 replacing Colonel Mohammad Anwar Latif Khan. He was appointed on deputation from Bangladesh Army. He oversaw special security arrangements for the Pahela Baishakh celebrations in 2019.

Alam left the additional director general (operations) at the Rapid Action Battalion on 27 June 2019 and was replaced by Colonel Tofayel Mustafa Sorwar. Alam was promoted to brigadier general and posted to 203rd Infantry Brigade. He was later appointed the commander of the President Guard Regiment. Alam returned to 19th Infantry Division as commander of 309th Infantry Brigade as of December 2024.

== Controversy ==
On 10 December 2021, the U.S. Department of the Treasury placed sanctions on Alam and added him to its Specially Designated Nationals (SDN) list under the Global Magnistsky Act for engaging in serious human rights abuses relating to his tenure at RAB, including the killing of Ekramul Haque. He was one of seven serving and former officers of RAB to be sanction by the United States. Following the sanctions, the United States ambassador to Bangladesh, Earl R. Miller, was summoned by the minister of foreign affairs of Bangladesh, A K Abdul Momen, who handed him a protest note. He was asked by Prime Bank Limited to close his account at the bank, which had been suspended, due to the U.S. sanctions. He was charged with crimes against humanity in October 2025 after the overthrow of the fifth Hasina ministry and taken into custody by the Bangladesh Army. He was one of 15 officers detained by the army along with Major General Sheikh Mohammad Sarwar Hossain, Brigadier General Tofayel Mustafa Sorwar and Colonel Mohammad Anwar Latif Khan.
