= Orders, decorations, and medals of Bangladesh =

The existing Bangladeshi honours system was created after Independence of Bangladesh. The highest civilian honours are the Independence Award and Ekushey Padak. They are awarded every year. The awards are civilian awards for a broad set of achievements in fields such as Education, Arts, Civil Service, or Social Service and Liberation War. Awards were also bestowed posthumously and they are not given for foreign citizens.

The most recognized and respected gallantry awards are the Bir (Bengali: বীর) awards which are Bir Sreshtho, Bir Uttom, Bir Bikrom and Bir Protik in decreasing order of importance. They are awarded to freedom fighters who showed utmost bravery and fought against the Pakistan Army in the Bangladesh Liberation War. All of these awards were introduced immediately after the Liberation War in 1971.

The 'Nakeeb Padak' (Bangla: নকীব পদক) has been awarded since 2021 for the contribution to Bengali literature.

== Civil decorations ==
=== General awards ===
- Independence Award; the highest civilian award
- Ekushey Padak; the second-highest civilian award

=== Literature awards ===
- Bangla Academy Award, for contribution in the field of Bengali language and literature.
- Shishu Academy Award, for contribution in the field of juvenile literature.

=== Particular awards ===
- National Professor; for outstanding contribution on the field of education.
- Shilpakala Padak; for contributions to the fields of Bangladeshi arts, theater, music, dance, instrumental music, folk music and film.
- Begum Rokeya Padak; for contribution to Gender equality and Women's rights.
- National Agriculture Awards; given to recognise a substantial contribution in the field of research in agricultural development.
- National Film Awards; for notable contributions to the promotion of the art of cinema.
- National Sports Awards (Bangladesh); for specific contributions in the field of games and sports.
- National Family Planning Awards
- National Child Award
- National Youth Awards
- National Cooperative Award
- President's Award for Industrial Development
- National Environment Award
- Public Administration Award

== Military decorations ==
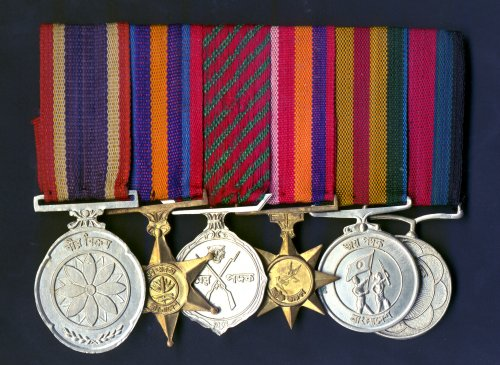
Military Medals of Bangladesh

The following are the various gallantry, service and war medals of the Bangladesh Armed Forces.

=== Wartime gallantry awards ===
- Bir Sreshtho-(Bengali: বীরশ্রেষ্ঠ; literally, "The Most Valiant Hero"), the highest gallantry award
- Bir Uttom- (Bengali: বীর উত্তম; literally, "Better among Braves"), the second highest gallantry award
- Bir Bikrom- (Bengali: বীর বিক্রম; literally, "Valiant hero"), the third highest gallantry award
- Bir Protik- (Bengali: বীর প্রতীক; literally, "Symbol of Bravery or Idol of Courage"), the fourth highest gallantry award

=== Peacetime gallantry awards ===
- Bir Sorbottam-(Bengali: বীর সর্বোত্তম; literally, "The Foremost Braves"), the highest gallantry award
- Bir Mrittunjoee- (Bengali: বীর মৃত্যুঞ্জয়ী; literally, "The Immortal Braves"), the second highest gallantry award
- Bir Chiranjib- (Bengali: বীর চিরঞ্জীব; literally, " The Incorruptible Braves"), the third highest gallantry award
- Bir Durjoy- (Bengali: বীর দুর্জয়; literally, "The Indomitable Braves"), the fourth highest gallantry award

=== Army service medals ===
- Army Medal সেনাবাহিনী পদক (SBP)
- Extraordinary Service Medal
- Distinguished Service Medal
- Army Medal of Glory সেনা গৌরব পদক (SGP)
- Army Medal of Excellence সেনা উৎকর্ষ পদক (SUP)
- Army Efficiency Medal সেনা পারদর্শিতা পদক (SPP)

=== Long service awards ===
- Jestha Padak I (10 years service)
- Jestha Padak II (20 years service)
- Jestha Padak III (27 years service)

== Special decorations (for non-nationals) ==
- Bangladesh Freedom Honour -(Bengali: বাংলাদেশ স্বাধীনতা সম্মাননা); the highest award for foreigners or non nationals,
- Bangladesh Liberation War Honour -(Bengali: বাংলাদেশ মুক্তিযুদ্ধ সম্মাননা); the second highest award for foreigners or non nationals
- Friends of Liberation War Honour -(Bengali: মুক্তিযুদ্ধ মৈত্রী সম্মাননা); the third highest award for foreigners or non nationals

== Police medals ==
Police medals are awarded every year in the annual Police Week Parade. They are awarded both for bravery and service.

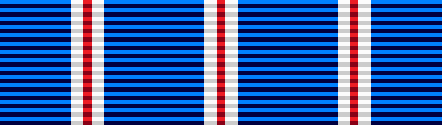
- Bangladesh Police Medal (Bravery)
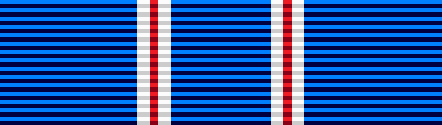
- Bangladesh Police Medal (Service)
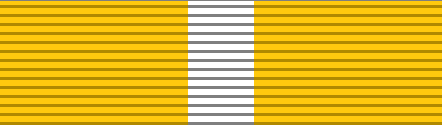
- President Police Medal (Bravery)
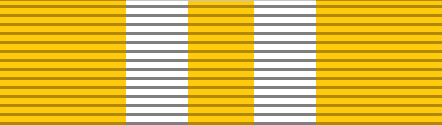
- President Police Medal (Service)

== Border Guard medals ==
- Border Guard Bangladesh Padak (Bravery)
- President Border Guard Padak (Bravery)
- Border Guard Bangladesh Padak (Service)
- President Border Guard Padak (Service)
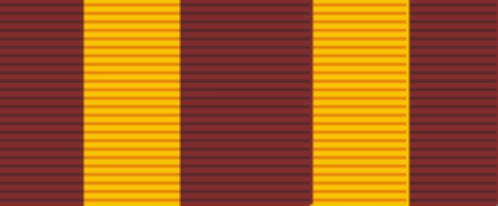
- Bi-Centennial Padak
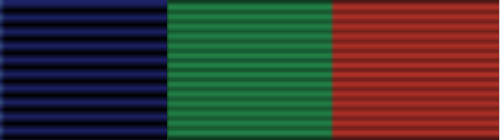
- Naf Padak

== Ansar and VDP medals ==
- Bangladesh Ansar Medal (Bravery)
- Bangladesh Ansar Medal (Service)
- President Ansar Medal (Bravery)
- President Ansar Medal (Service)
- Bangladesh VDP Medal (Bravery)
- Bangladesh VDP Medal (Service)
- President VDP Medal (Service)

== See also ==
- Military awards and decorations of Bangladesh
- Awards and decorations of the Bangladesh Liberation War
