= Kamrul Asraf Khan =

Bangladeshi politician

Kamrul Ashraf Khan Poton (born 1 January 1960) is a Bangladeshi businessman, former independent politician and a former Member of Parliament from Narsingdi-2, Bangladesh, having been elected in 2014.

Khan is the current president and lawmaker of the Bangladesh Fertiliser Association. Kamrul Ashraf Khan is one of the highest income tax payers of People's Republic of Bangladesh in the business category. Khan has been recognised by NBR as one of the highest tax paying individuals of the country for 4 consecutive years and has been awarded by Bangladeshi government for his tax diligence.
