= Sher-e-Bangla Nagar =

Thana in Dhaka North City Corporation, Bangladesh

Sher-e-Bangla Nagar শেরেবাংলা নগর
- Thana
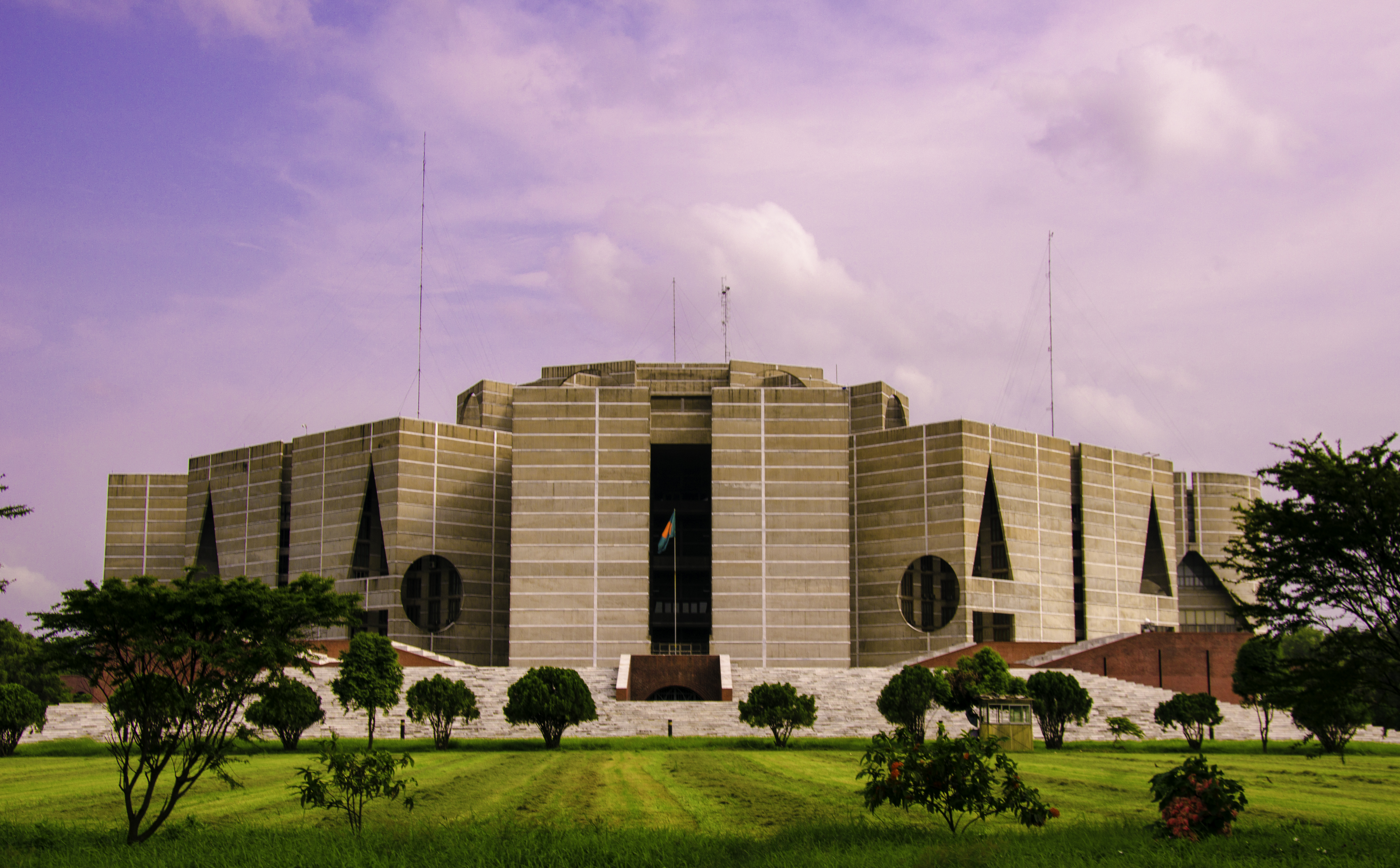
- National Parliament Building is the most prominent landmark at Sher-e-Bangla Nagar
- Expandable map of vicinity of Sher-e-Bangla Nagar Thana
- Location of Sher-e-Bangla Nagar Thana within Dhaka Location of Sher-e-Bangla Nagar Thana within Dhaka Division Location of Sher-e-Bangla Nagar Thana within Bangladesh
- Coordinates: 23.76994°N 90.3763°E
- Country: Bangladesh
- Division: Dhaka Division
- District: Dhaka District
- Established as a thana: 2009

Area
  - Total: 4.45 km^{2} (1.72 sq mi)
- Elevation: 23 m (75 ft)

Population (2022)
  - Total: 159,673
  - Density: 26,204/km^{2} (67,870/sq mi)
- Time zone: UTC+06:00 (BST)
- Postal code: 1207
- Area code: 02

Sher-e-Bangla Nagar (Bengali: শেরেবাংলা নগর; lit. City of the Lion of Bengal) is a neighborhood and a thana of Dhaka, the capital of Bangladesh. It is also known as the 'capitol within the capital' due to it being the home to the National Parliament and Ganabhaban. The thana was formed in 2009 from parts of Tejgaon, Kafrul and Mohammadpur thanas. Sher-e-Bangla Nagar is a commercial and central neighborhood in the city, home to offices of government and public institutions, educational institutions, banks and financial institutions and shops.

== Etymology ==
Sher-e-Bangla Nagar was named after A. K. Fazlul Huq, a Bangladeshi statesman and political figure who was known as "Sher-e-Bangla" (Tiger of Bengal).

== History ==
The history of Sher-e-Bangla Nagar can be traced back to before the independence of Bangladesh. Designed by Louis I. Kahn, the complex in Dhaka was designed to make a significant impact locally and internationally and to represent the strong presence of the central government of what was then Pakistan. 11 kilometres (7 mi) from the city center, the project originally consisted of the National Assembly building and three hostels (that is, temporary accommodations for officials and delegates coming from West Pakistan when parliament was in session). One hostel was for ministers, one for secretaries, and one for the delegates to the National Assembly. The assembly and hostels were grouped together and called the "Citadel of the Assembly."

An early version shows some civic functions, called by the architect the "Citadel of the Institutions," grouped opposite the assembly. None of its constituents was ever built and, in 1971, it was replaced by the National Secretariat of Bangladesh. After 1975, the nation became more stable, and the project was revived. The capítol complex was again seen as a symbol; this time of the new government's stability and accomplishments.

== Demographics ==
According to 2011 Census of Bangladesh, Sher-e-Bangla Nagar Thana has a population of 137,573 with average household size of 4.6 members, and an average literacy rate of 78.2% vs national average of 51.8% literacy.

== Offices and organizations ==
The Ministry of Defense and Election Commission of Bangladesh are in Sher-e-Bangla Nagar. Furthermore, Asian Development Bank Bangladesh Resident Mission is across from the Local Government Engineering Department (LGED). Sher-e-Bangla Nagar houses the Department of Immigration and Passports, an attached department under the Ministry of Home Affairs of the Government of the People's Republic of Bangladesh. The National Parliament is located here which is one of the country's prominent aesthetic architectural structures designed by American architect Louis I. Kahn. Liberation War Museum, Bangladesh Institute of Development Studies, Bangladesh Investment Development Authority, Bangladesh Telecommunication Regulatory Commission and Sher-e-Bangla Nagar Telephone Exchange are here as well. Islamic Development Bank Bangladesh branch is right beside BCS Computer City. The Bangladesh–China Friendship Conference Center, is one of the largest international convention centres in Bangladesh. The Bangladesh-China Friendship Center was built in 2002 at a cost of approximately ৳300 crore (US$56 million) in Sher-e-Bangla Nagar.

== Education ==
The Sher-e-Bangla Agricultural University is located in Sher-e-Bangla. Shaheed Suhrawardy Medical College is near the Ministry of Defense. Some well-known schools including Gonobhaban Government High School, Sher-e-Bangla Nagar Government Boys' High School, Sher-e-Bangla Nagar Government Girls' High School, St. Joseph Higher Secondary School are also housed in Sher-e-Bangla. The one degree college is Sher-e-Bangla Nagar Adarsha Mohila College.

== Gallery ==
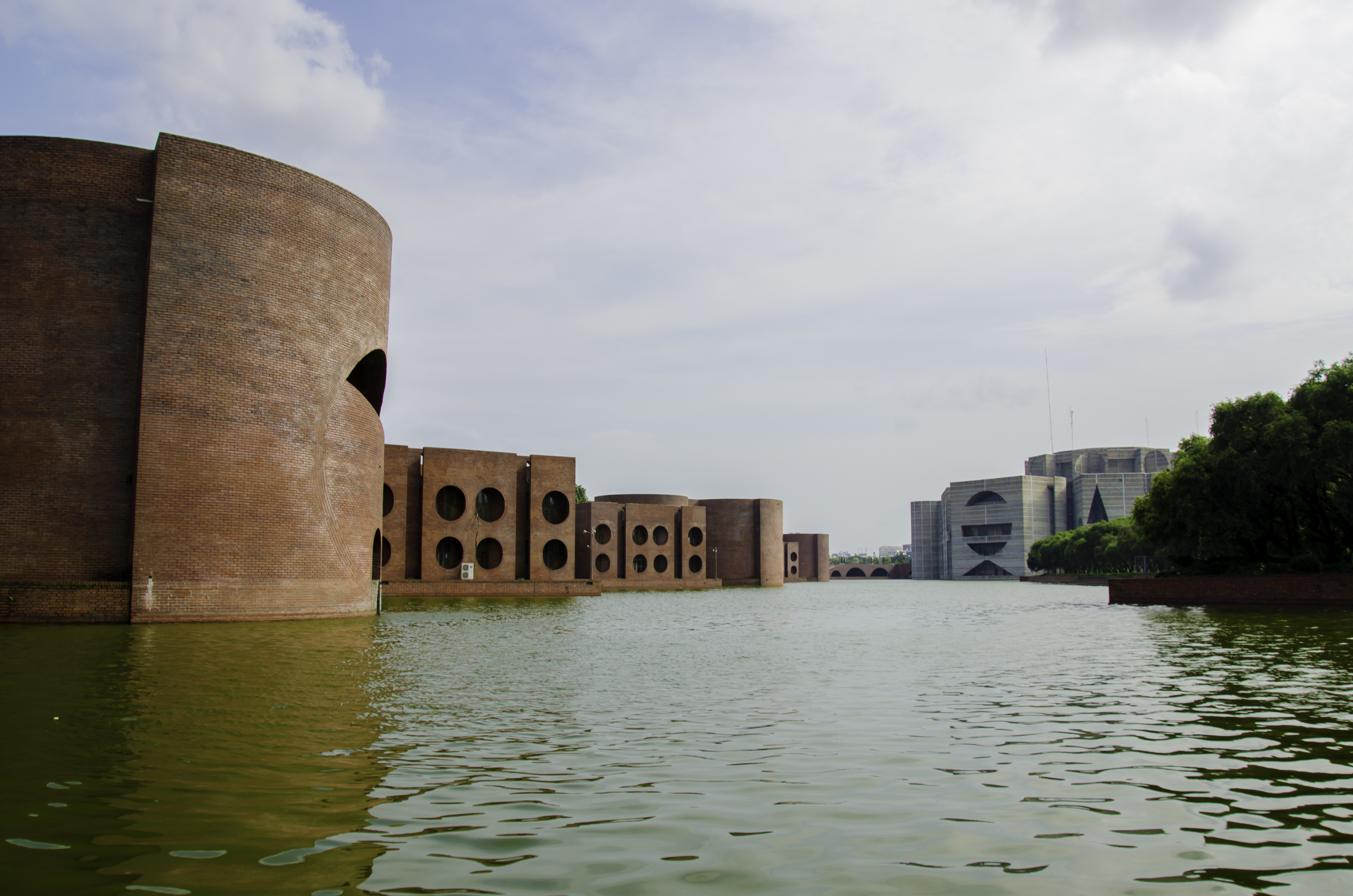
Offices of Members of Parliament

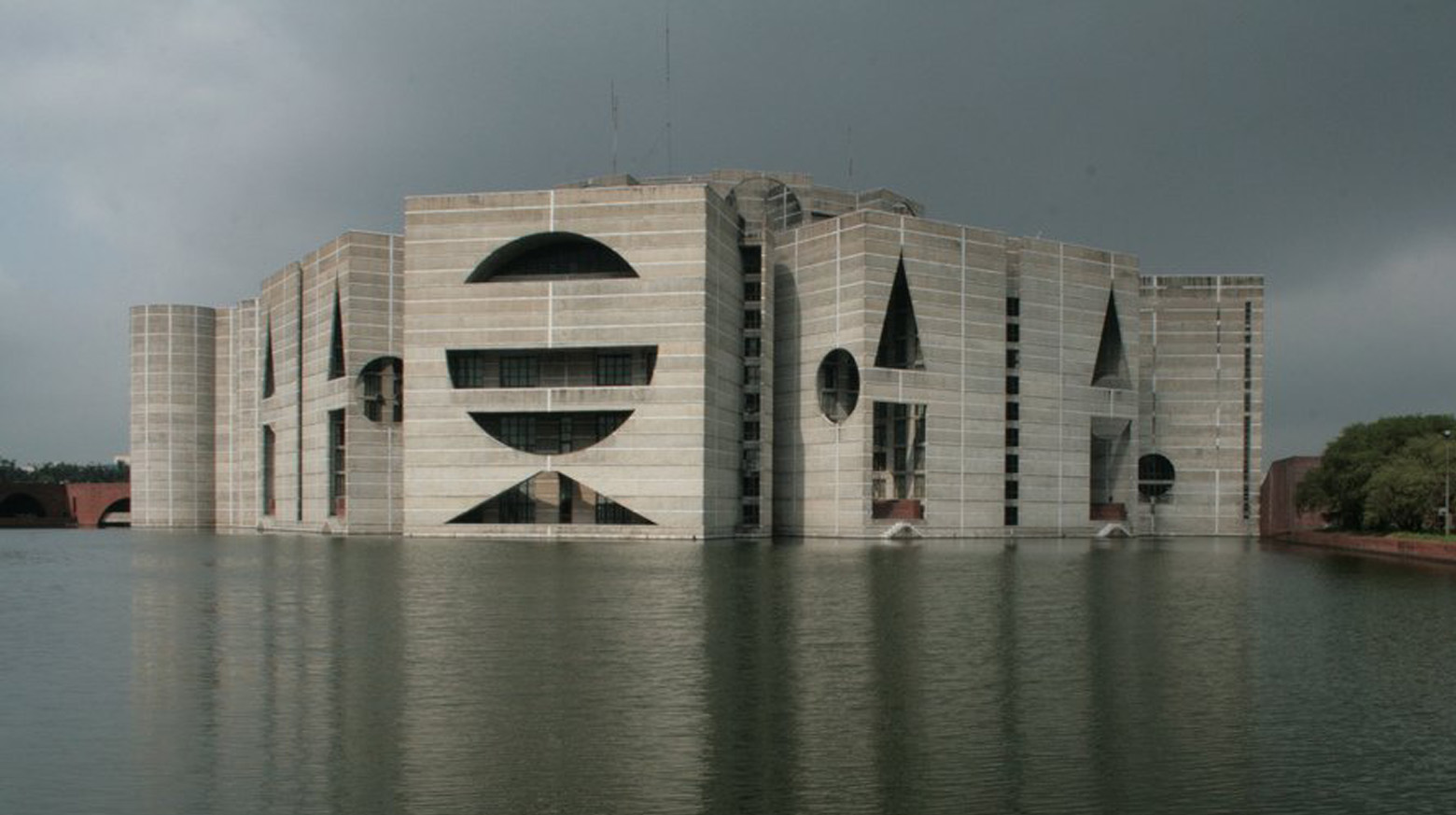
National Parliament of Bangladesh

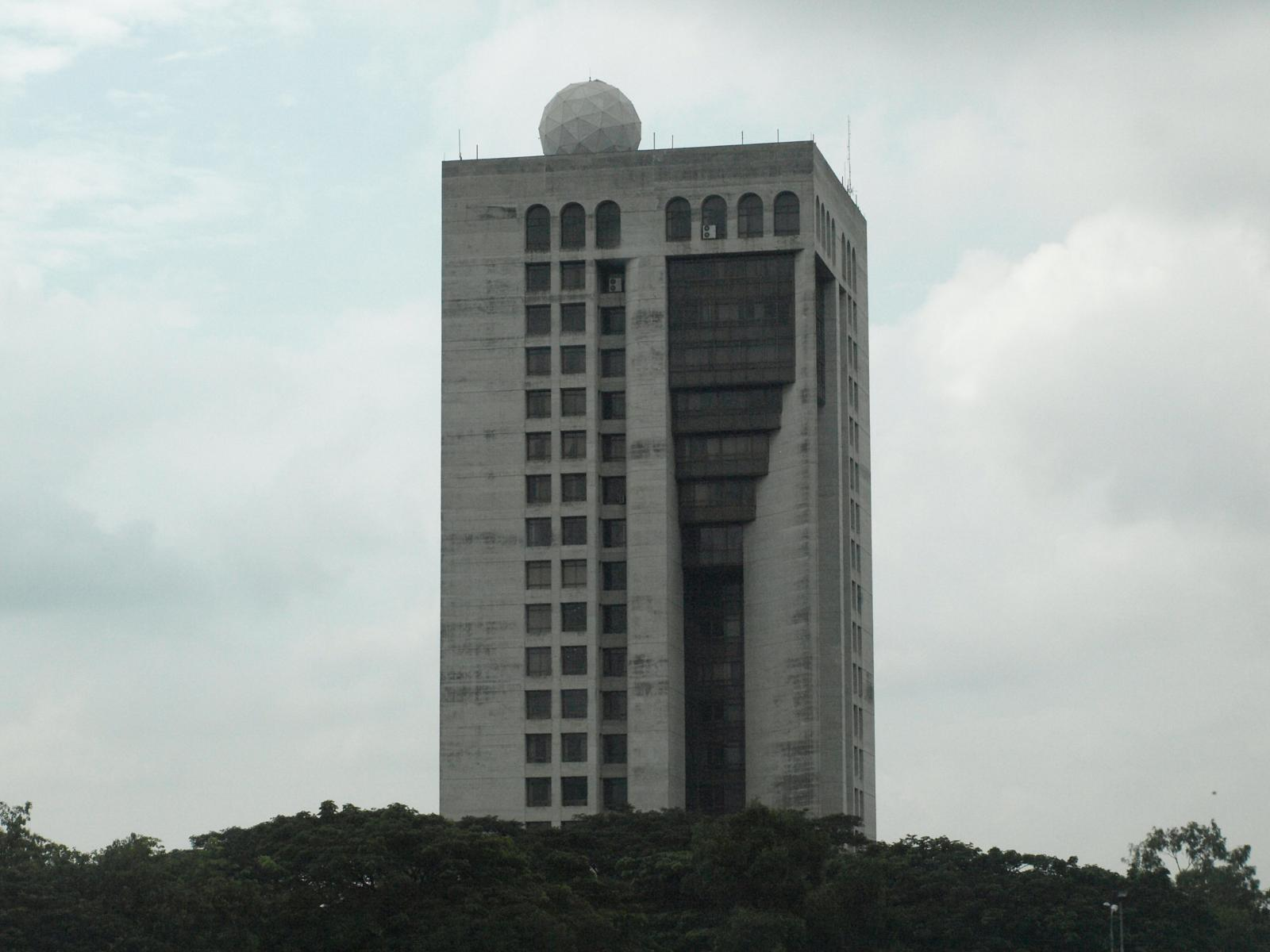
Islamic Development Bank, Dhaka

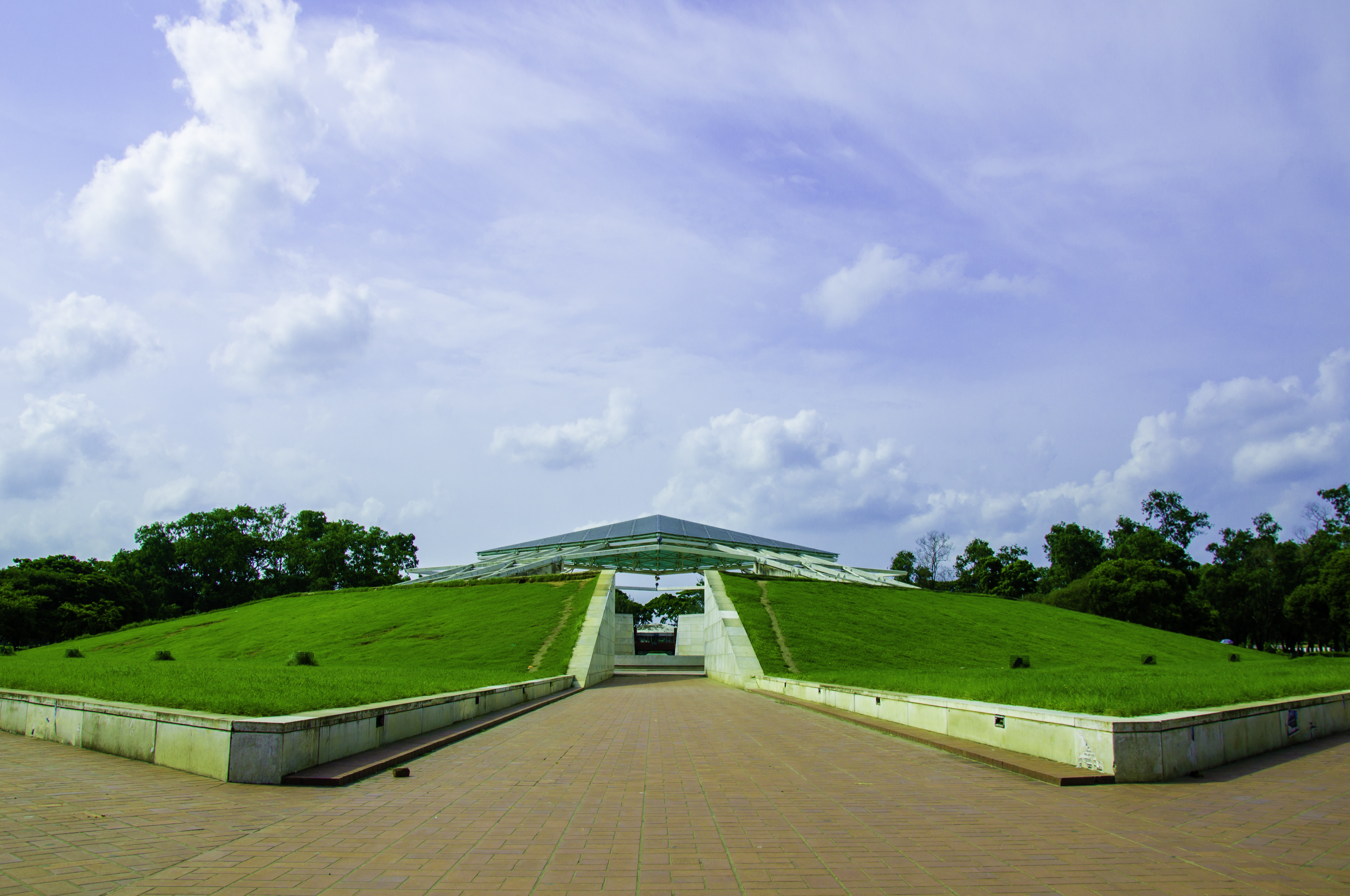
Mausoleum of Ziaur Rahman
