= Agargaon =

Administrative Neighbourhood of Dhaka City, Bangladesh

Agargaon আগারগাঁও
- Mahalla
- Interactive map of Agargaon
- Coordinates: 23.779195°N 90.373658°E
- Country: Bangladesh
- Division: Dhaka Division
- District: Dhaka District
- Time zone: UTC+6 (BST)
- Postal Code: 1207

Agargaon (alternative spelling Agargăo) is an administrative neighbourhood of Dhaka.

== Education ==
Sher-e-Bangla Nagar Government Boys' High School and Sher-e-Bangla Nagar Government Girls' High School are public secondary schools, established in 1969 and 1970, respectively. In addition to high school curriculum (both boys' and girls'), the schools started college level education in 2008.

== Significant facilities ==
- Agargaon metro station
- Local Government Engineering Department
- IDB Bhaban
- Bangladesh Computer Samity
- Bangabandhu International Conference Center
- Bangladesh Election Commission
- Weather office
- Immigration & Passport office
- Asian Development Bank
- Palli Karma-Sahayak Foundation
- World Bank
- Parjatan Bhaban
- Lions Eye Institute & Hospital
- Bangladesh Investment Development Authority
- Department of Social Services (Bangladesh)

== Hospitals ==
- Dhaka Shishu Hospital
- National Institute of Traumatology and Orthopedic Rehabilitation
- National Institute of Neurosciences & Hospital
- National Institute of Cardiovascular Diseases, Bangladesh
- National Institute of Laboratory Medicine & Referral Centre

== Gallery ==
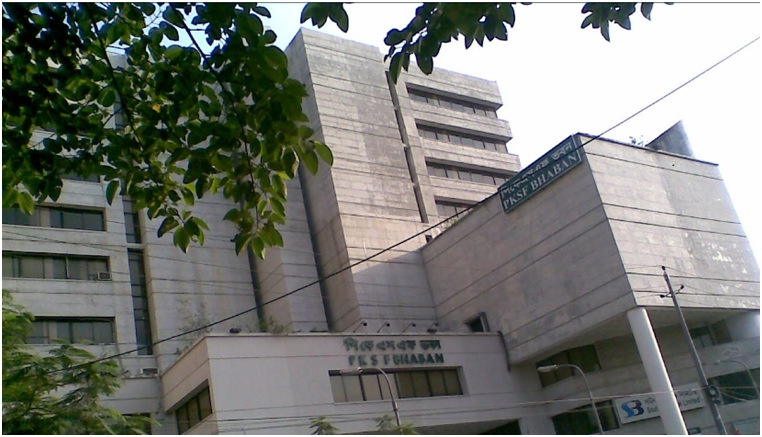
PKSF Bhaban

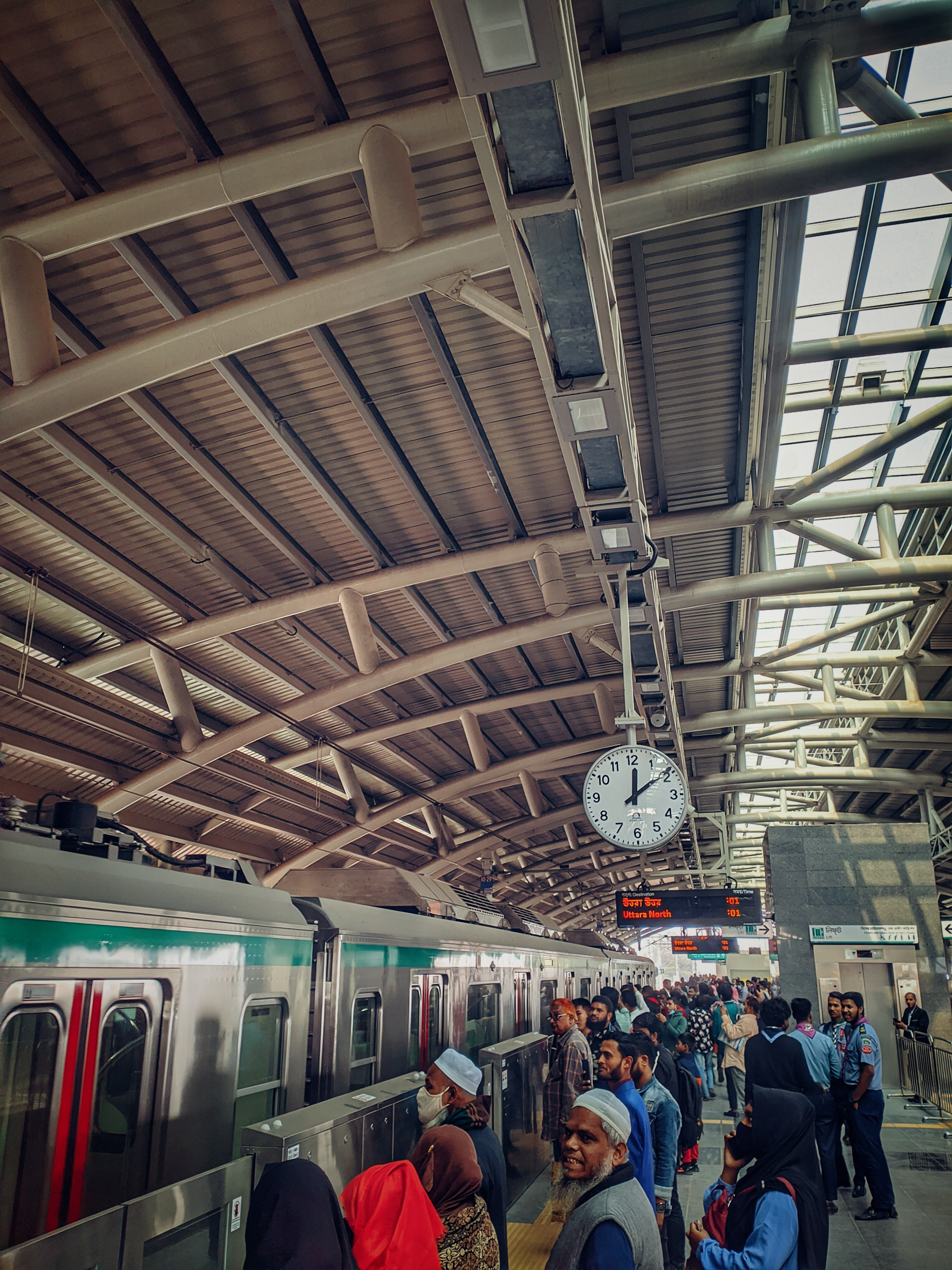
Metro station
