= Kalarab Shilpigosthi =

Bangladeshi Islamic organization and record label

- Official Logo Of Kalarab
- Founded: May 27, 2004; 22 years ago
- Founder: Aynuddin Al Azad
- Status: Active
- Distributor: Holy Tune
- Genre: Islamic music; Nasheed; Ghazal; Naat
- Country of origin: Bangladesh
- Location: 18 Old Paltan, Dhaka, Bangladesh

Kalarab Shilpigosthi is a national Islamic cultural organization for children and teenagers in Bangladesh. It was founded in 2004 by Islamic musician Aynuddin Al Azad. As of June 17, 2021, Kalarab had achieved four million subscribers on YouTube.

Kalarab Shilpigosthi
- Kararab's Logo

YouTube information
- Channel: HolyTunebdofficial
- Years active: 2011-present
- Genre: Music
- Subscribers: 10 million
- Views: 2.5 billion
- Last updated: 18 August 2025

== History ==
On 27 May 2004, Kalarab Shilpigoshthi was launched under the guidance of Aynuddin Al Azad. After the sudden death of its founder in 2010, the organization faced a period of crisis. Later, under the leadership of Mufti Saeed Ahmad, Muhammad Badruzzaman, and Abu Rayhan, along with the combined efforts of young artists, the organization revived, with the establishment of a digital platform called Holy Tune.

== Activities ==
Kalarab regularly produces new music, organizes musical events, and spreads the message of Islam through various media.

Kalarab maintains its own record label and production company, Holy Tune. On YouTube, Holy Tune’s subscriber count is close to 10 million, for which it has received YouTube’s Gold Play Button, and is on the verge of achieving the Diamond Play Button.

=== Music events and programs ===
On 10 May 2017, Kalarab participated in a cultural evening event held in Dhaka. On 18 September 2024, Kalarab participated in a Ghazal evening event organized by the University of Chittagong. On 28 September, Kalarab held an Islamic music evening at the Central Shaheed Minar of Dhaka College. In addition, Kalarab performed Islamic music at Haraganga College.

On 24 July 2025, for the first time, Kalarab’s Ghazal evening was held at the TSC of Dhaka University in memory of the martyrs and injured of the Students Against Discrimination.

Kalarab's music is primarily based on ghazals and naats. Their songs feature a blend of traditional melodies with modern musical arrangements.

Holy Tune mainly produces and distributes Islamic music, and is owned by singer Muhammad Badruzzaman. The label was established in 2016, and since its inception, it has been under contract with Kalarab. As a result, all songs of Kalarab are exclusively produced and distributed by Holy Tune.

== Artists ==
- Aynuddin Al Azad (Founder)
- Muhammad Badruzzaman (Chief Executive Officer)
- Saeed Ahmad (Director)
- Abu Rayhan (Director)
- Hossain Adnan
- Ahmad Abdullah
- Fazle Rabby
- Mahfuzul Alam (former, passed away in 2021)
- Ahnaf Khalid

== Discography ==
Year	Title	Lyricist	Director	Artist / Commentary
2016	Hotat Azrael Pathaiya	Imtiaz Masrur	Muhammad Badruzzaman	Artist: Abu Rayhan
2016	Salliala Muhammda	Ahmad Abdullah	Muhammad Badruzzaman	Artist: Kalarab Shilpigosthi
2016	Rongin E Prithibi Charite Hoibe	Ainuddin Al Azad	Muhammad Badruzzaman	Artist: Sayed Ahmad
2017	Allahu Allahu	Shah Iftekhar Tarik	Muhammad Badruzzaman	Artist: Abu Rayhan and Kalarab
2017	Salat Kayem Koro	Ahmad Abdullah	Muhammad Badruzzaman	Artist: Kalarab Shishu Shilpi (Kalarab Child Artists)
2018	Tribhuboner Priyo Muhammad	Kazi Nazrul Islam	Muhammad Badruzzaman	Written by Kazi Nazrul Islam
2018	Ami Dekhini Tomay	Abu Hena	Muhammad Badruzzaman	Artist: Kalarab Shilpigosthi
2018	Elo Khushir Borat	Ahmad Abdullah	Muhammad Badruzzaman	Artist: Kalarab Shishu Shilpi (Kalarab Child Artists)
2018	Hasbi Rabbi Jalallah	Collected	Muhammad Badruzzaman	Artist: Muhammad Badruzzaman
2018	Allah Bolo	Ahmad Abdullah	Muhammad Badruzzaman	Artist: Kalarab Shilpigosthi
2019	Elo Khushir Eid	Kazi Nazrul Islam	Shaheed Emtu	Artist: Kalarab Shilpigosthi
2019	Hriday Majhe Mala Gathi	Mahfuzul Alam	Muhammad Badruzzaman	Artist: Mahfuz Alam and Tawhid Jamil
2019	Hriday Majhe Mala Gathi	Mahfuzul Alam	Muhammad Badruzzaman	Artist: Abu Rayhan and Mahfuzul Alam
2019	Elo Mahe Ramadan	Iqbal Mahmud	Saif Ullah	Artist: Kalarab Shishu Shilpi (Kalarab Child Artists)
2019	Dajjal Rukho	Muhib Khan	Saif Ullah	Artist: Kalarab Shilpigosthi
2019	Allah’r Bhoy	Ahmad Abdullah	H Al Hadi	Artist: Kalarab Shishu Shilpi (Kalarab Child Artists)
2019	Bondho Duar	Ahmad Abdullah	H Al Hadi	Performed for street children
2019	Iqra (IQRA)	Ahmad Abdullah	H Al Hadi	Artist: Kalarab Shilpigosthi
2019	Ramadan	Saif Masum	Muhammad Badruzzaman	Artist: Kalarab Shilpigosthi
2019	Zikrullah	Ahmad Abdullah	Sayed Ahmad	Artist: Muhammad Badruzzaman
2020	Hariye Jabo Ekdin	Aminul Islam Mamun	Muhammad Badruzzaman	Artist: Abu Rayhan
2020	Koto Janazar Porechi Namaz	Abdul Hadi	H Al Hadi	Artist: Huzaifa Islam
2020	Nobijir Dushmon	Ahmad Abdullah	Rajib Hasan	Artist: Huzaifa Islam
2020	Amar’o Chilo Shob Ekdin	Belal Hosain	H Al Hadi	Artist: Huzaifa Islam
2020	Miche Jibon	Belal Hosain	H Al Hadi	Artist: Huzaifa Islam
2020	Abbu Tomar Chuti Kobe	Ahmad Abdullah	H Al Hadi	Artist: Unaisa Tanzim
2020	Facebook	Shah Iftekhar Tarik	H Al Hadi	Artist: Sayed Ahmad
2020	Quran (QURAN)	Abdullah Al Kafi	H Al Hadi	Artist: Abu Rayhan and Hossain Adnan
2020	Janaza	Abdullah Al Kafi	H Al Hadi	Artist: Abu Rayhan
2020	Porda Narir Rup’er Bhushan	Shah Iftekhar Tarik	H Al Hadi	Artist: Sayed Ahmad and Muhammad Badruzzaman
2020	Priyo Baba	Mahfuzul Alam	H Al Hadi	Artist: Mahfuzul Alam
2020	Bhulte Parina Ma	Abul Ala Masum	H Al Hadi	Artist: Huzaifa Islam
2020	Subhanallah Bolo	Ahmad Abdullah	H Al Hadi	Artist: Muhammad Badruzzaman and Unaisa Tanzim
2021	Ami Atim Bole	Selim Sani	Abu Bakkar Siddique	Over 88 million views on YouTube
2021	Tumi Kemon Muslman	Rajib Hasan	Tawhid Jamim	Artist: Sayed Ahmad
2021	Ishqe Nabi Jindabad	Shah Iftekhar Tarik	H Al Hadi	Artist: Kalarab Shilpigoshthi
2021	O Batas Amay Tumi Niye Jao Na	Ainuddin Al Azad	H Al Hadi	Artist: Abu Rayhan
2021	Bare Bare Bhabi Eka	Abdul Kader Howlader	H Al Hadi	Artist: Huzaifa Islam
2021	Biyer Gojol (Marriage Song)	Tawhid Jamil	H Al Hadi	Artist: Tawhid Jamil and Kalarab
2021	Tumi Kemon Musalman (Shishu Konth’e)	Rajib Hasan	H Al Hadi	Artist: Umair and Sayed Ahmad
2021	Ajob Taka	Kazi Maruf	Muhammad Badruzzaman	Artist: Muhammad Badruzzaman
2021	Nobir Rup’er Alo	Belal Hosain	H Al Hadi	Artist: Rifaat, Sifat, and Shawon
2021	Podma Meghna	Ainuddin Al Azad	H Al Hadi	Artist: Mahfuzul Alam
2021	Ekdin Hobe Lash	Abdullah Al Kafi	H Al Hadi	Artist: Tawhid Jamil
2021	Oi Dur Simanay	Imtiaz Masrur	H Al Hadi	Artist: Huzaifa Islam
2021	Sedin’o Eman Kore	Belal Hosain	H Al Hadi	Artist: Huzaifa Islam and Muhammad Badruzzaman
2022	Eto Bhalobasho Keno Malik	Abdur Rahman Torfadar	H Al Hadi	Artist: Qari Abu Rayhan
2022	Moira Gele Fira Asena	Rafiqul Islam Tawhid	Muhammad Badruzzaman	Acting: Misha Soudagar
2022	Shon Musalman	Rafiqul Islam	H Al Hadi	Artist: Huzaifa Islam
2022	Porer Jaiga Porer Jomi	Abdul Latif	H Al Hadi	Artist: Huzaifa Islam
2023	Alifun Ba	Muhammad Badruzzaman	Muhammad Badruzzaman	Artist: Muhammad Badruzzaman

== Awards and recognition ==
- YouTube Creator Awards: The Holy Tune YouTube channel has received the Silver Play Button, Gold Play Button and the Diamond Play Button from YouTube.
- Special Honor (2022): Holy Tune was awarded a special honor by the Bangladesh Deeni Seba Foundation for its contributions to the promotion and dissemination of Islamic music. The award was presented at an event honoring internationally awarded Hafiz at the Bangabandhu International Conference Center.

== Government registration ==
In April 2025, Kalarab Shilpigoshthi officially registered under the Department of Social Services of the Ministry of Social Welfare, Government of Bangladesh, as the "Shishu Kishor Sangskritik Songothon Kalarab." Its registration number is Dhaka-010090.

There have been media reports at various times regarding members joining or leaving the group. Additionally, in the context of classical scholarly differences of opinion in Islam regarding the use of musical instruments, Kalarab’s modern musical arrangements have occasionally sparked discussions.
