= Gonobhaban Government High School =

Coordinates: 23.7682°N 90.3734°E

- গণভবন সরকারি উচ্চ বিদ্যালয়
- Dhaka, Bangladesh

Information
- Type: Government school
- Established: 1 March 1980
- Head teacher: Sultana Jahan
- Teaching staff: 53
- Gender: Boys and girls
- Age: 6 years+
- Enrollment: More than 1800
- Classes: 1 to 10
- Language: Bengali
- Colors: White and Navy Blue
- Accreditation: Board of Intermediate and Secondary Education, Dhaka
- Yearbook: Ongkur অঙ্কুর

Gonobhaban Government High School (Bengali: গণভবন সরকারী উচ্চ বিদ্যালয়) is a government secondary school in Dhaka, Bangladesh. It was established as "Sher-e-Bangla Nagar Government Junior High School" on March 1, 1980. It is beside the area of former prime minister Sheikh Hasina's residence Gonobhaban in Sher-e-Bangla Nagor. It is for both boys and girls, with girls in the morning and boys with day sessions.

== Structure ==
Gonobhaban Government High School is situated at College Gate (beside Prime Minister's residence) in Dhaka city. The school enrolls students from grades 1–10. The school operates two shift. Girls are in morning shift and boys are in day shift. Morning shift generally starts at 7.30am and ends at 12.00pm. Again day shift starts at 12.30pm and ends at 5.15pm. For both shift, there exist one section from class 1-5 and there exist two shift from class 6–10. There is a single building of this school. It's a three storeyed building and this building shaped like English word H. In average, each section has 60 students. The school is full of plenty of nature. There is a big playing ground for students. In every year, more than 250 students appear in the public Junior School Certificate (JSC) and Secondary School Certificate (SSC) examination.

== Admission ==
Under the control of ‘Directorate General of Secondary and Higher Education, Dhaka’ admission lottery of all the government schools of Dhaka city are taken. There is no intense competition in the admission process of class 1. But in other classes one has to participate in 'admission test' for the chance of admission to this school. Usually students are admitted in all class (except 10). The admission test is taken usually in December after the 'Annual exam' ( also called yearly exam) of the school.
