= Bangladesh China Friendship Conference Center =

Conference Facility in Dhaka, Bangladesh

- বাংলাদেশ চীন মৈত্রী সম্মেলন কেন্দ্র
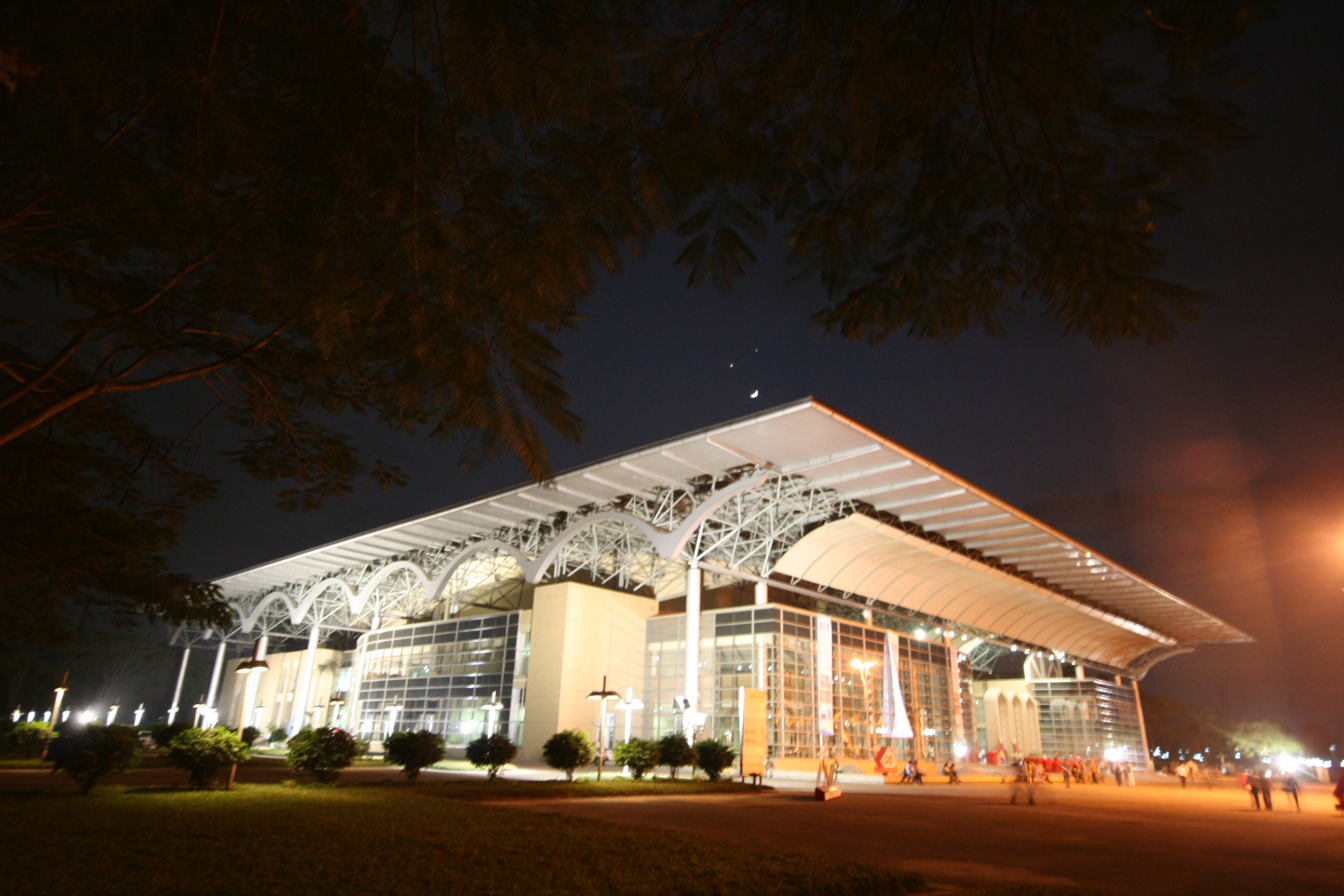
- Bangladesh China Friendship Conference Center
- Interactive map of the Bangladesh China Friendship Conference Center area
- Former names: Bangabandhu International Conference Center

General information
- Status: Completed
- Type: Conference Facility
- Architectural style: Contemporary architecture
- Location: Agargaon, Sher-e-Bangla, Dhaka, Dhaka, Bangladesh
- Coordinates: 23.7693°N 90.3816°E
- Completed: 2001
- Opened: 2002; 24 years ago
- Cost: US$ 5 million

Technical details
- Grounds: 50,000 m^{2} (538,200 sq ft)

Design and construction
- Architects: Beijing Institute of Architectural Designs and Research

Other information
- Parking: 700

Website
- Official website

Bangladesh China Friendship International Conference Center (BCFICC) is an international conference facility located in Sher-e-Bangla Nagar, Dhaka, Bangladesh. It was designed by the Beijing Institute of Architectural Designs and Research.

The BCFICC has seventeen venues for holding small to large scale events, including state functions, social events, seminars, conferences, product launches, annual general meetings, fairs, exhibitions, cultural programs, reality shows, etc. Over the years, BCFICC has hosted numerous international conferences and summits over the years including 13th SAARC summit.

== Gallery ==
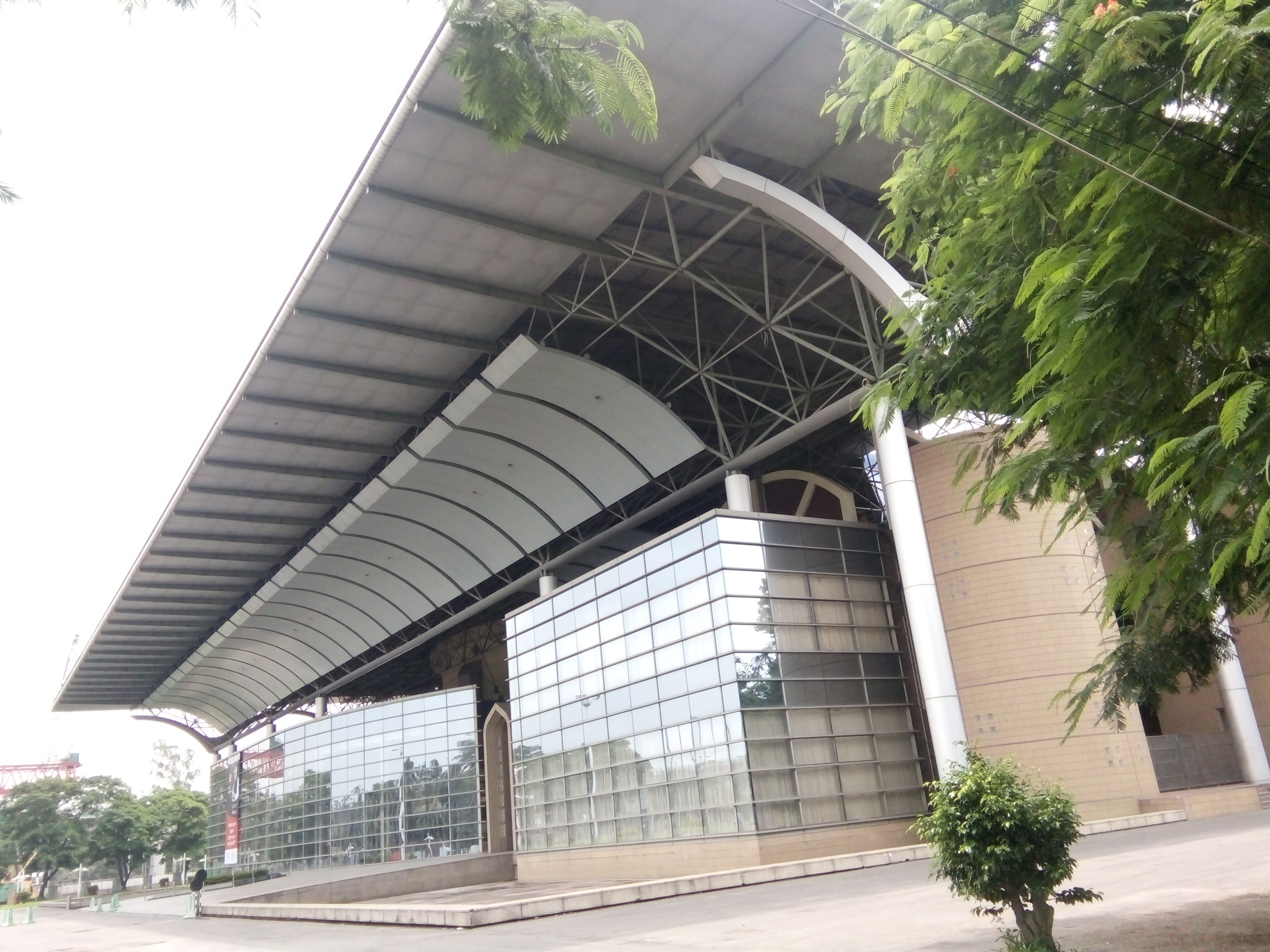
North-west side of Bangladesh China Friendship International Conference Center

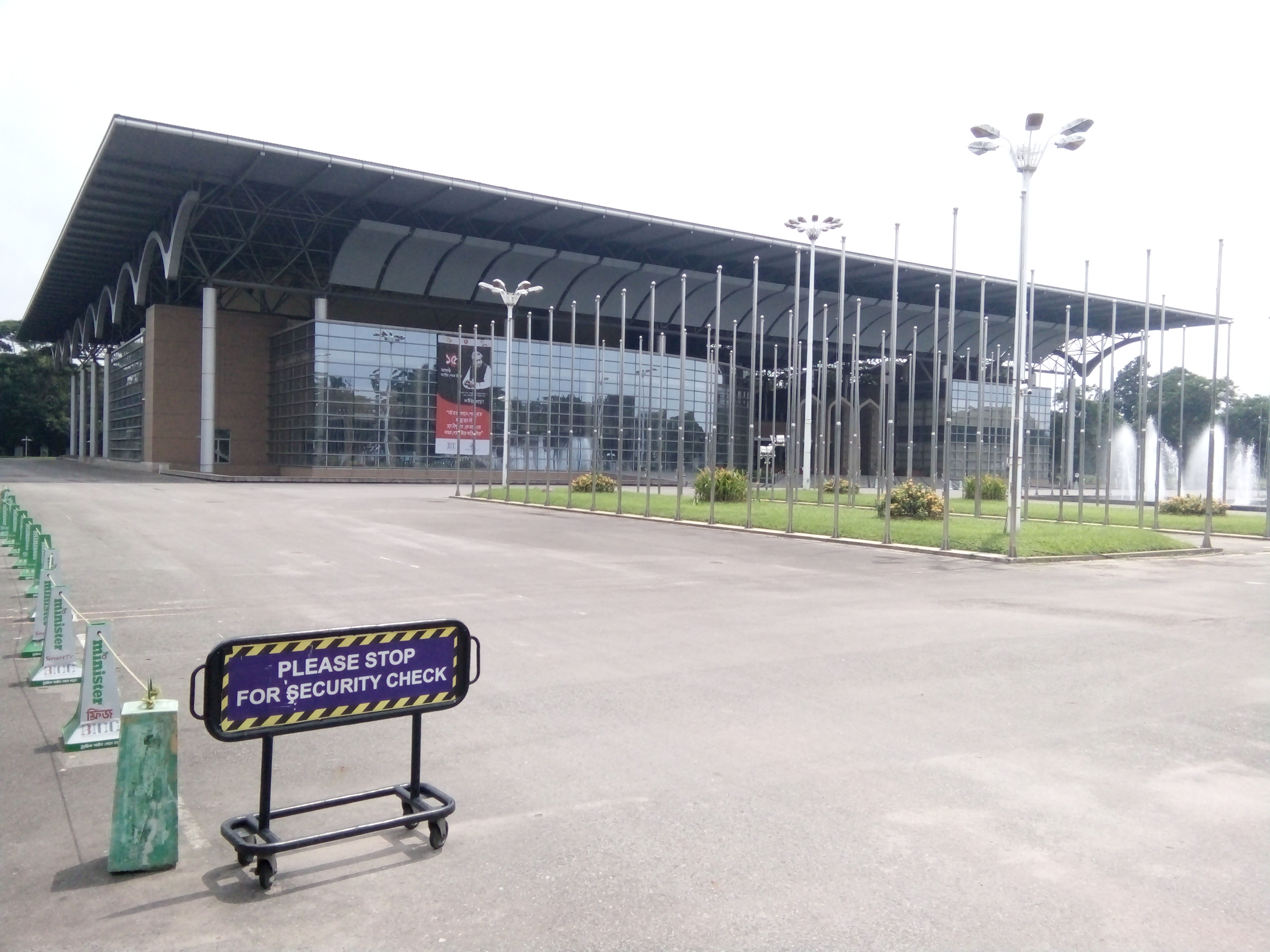
Towards the main entrance (east-north) of the Bangladesh China Friendship International Conference Center

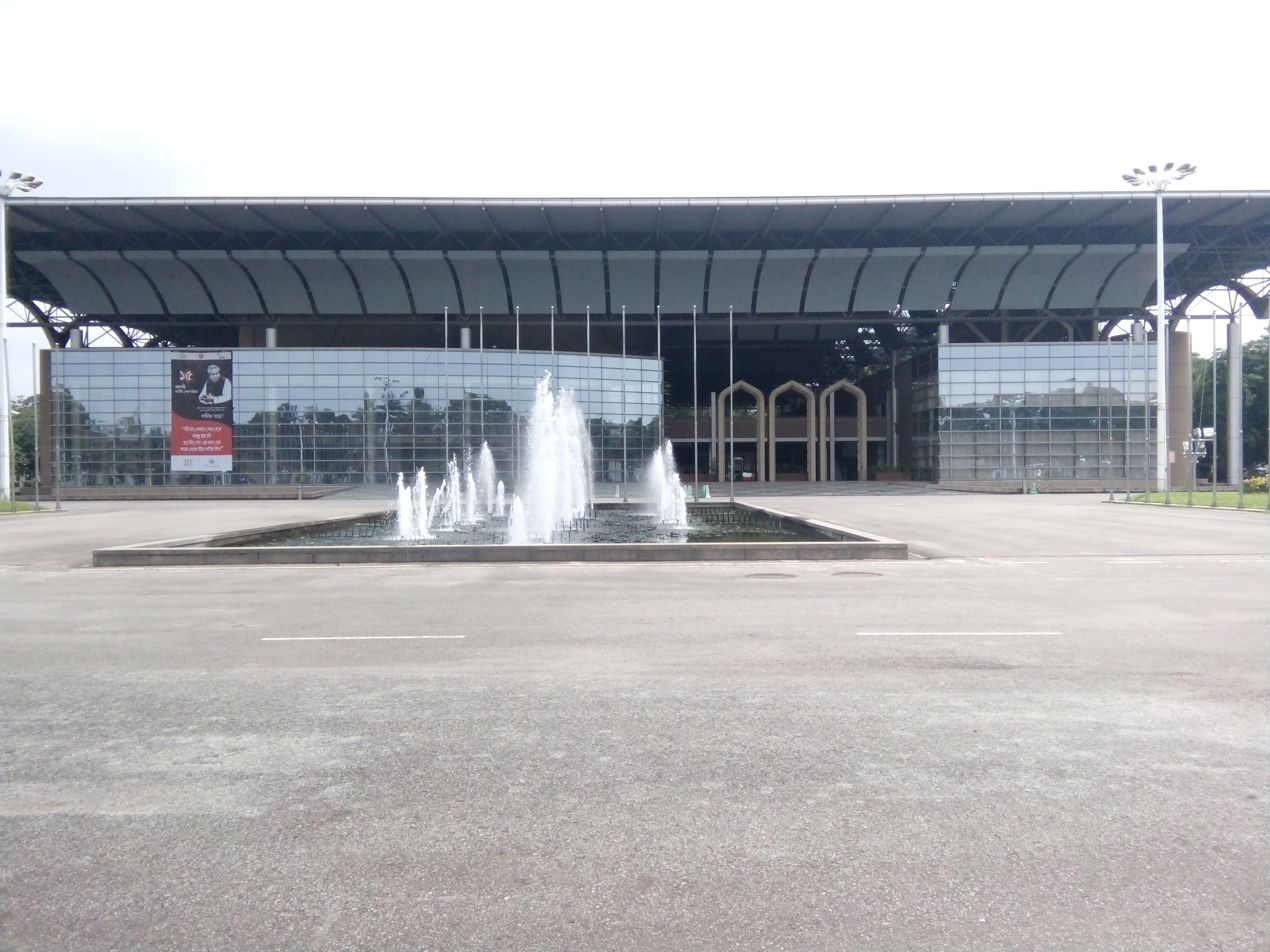
Front of Bangladesh China Friendship International Conference Center

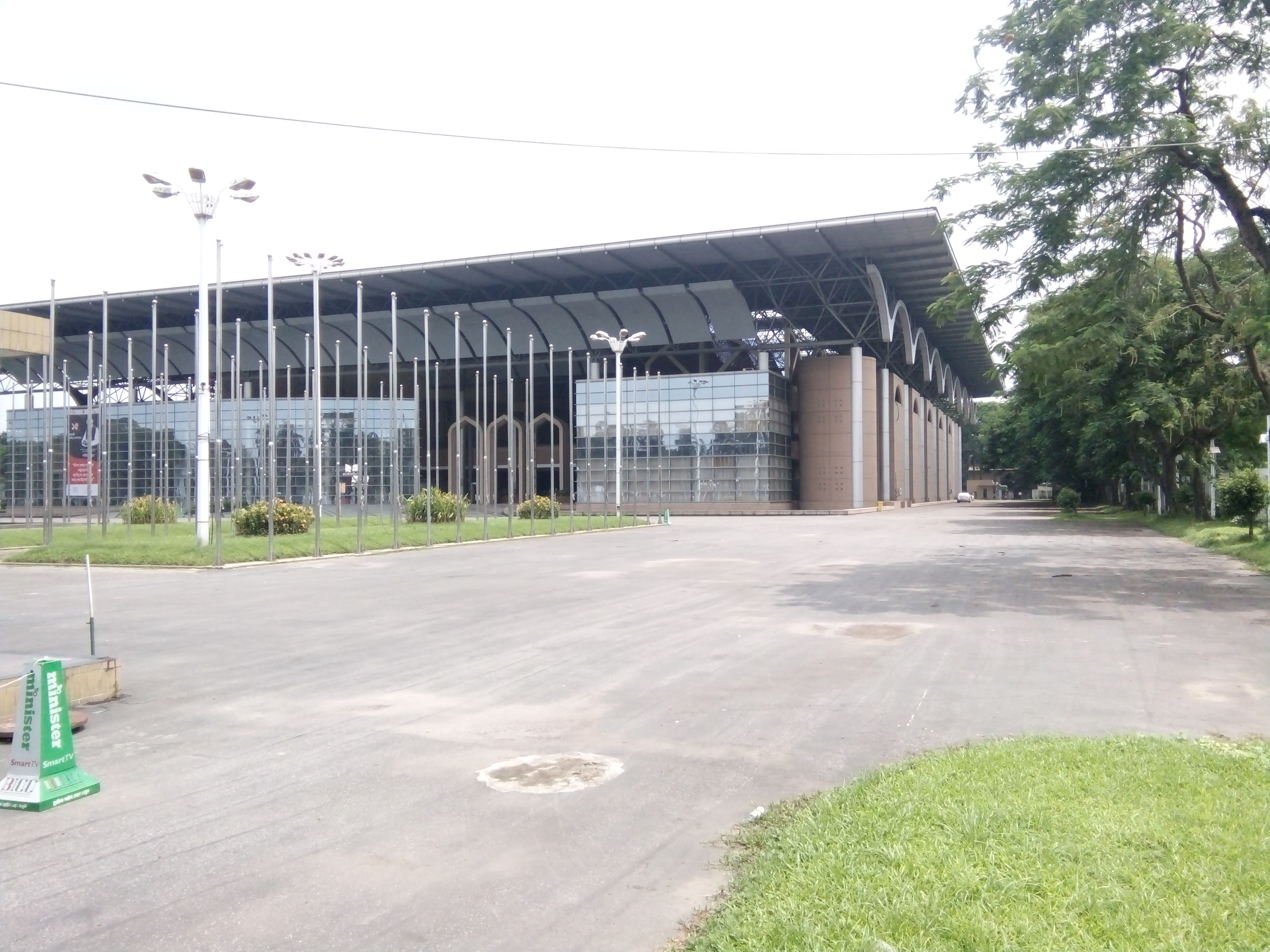
Bangladesh China Friendship International Conference Center is the main building

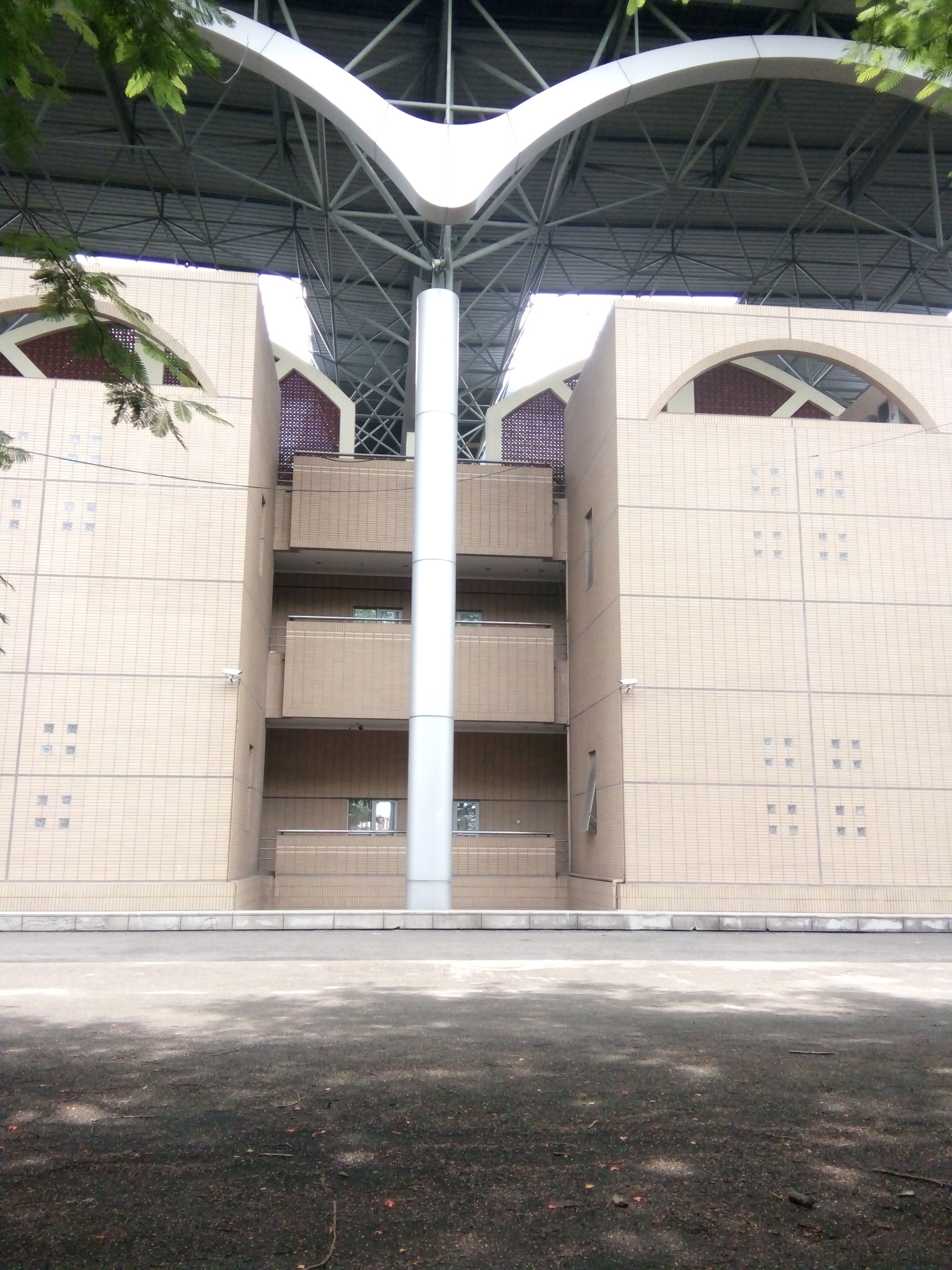
West wall of Bangladesh China Friendship International Conference Center

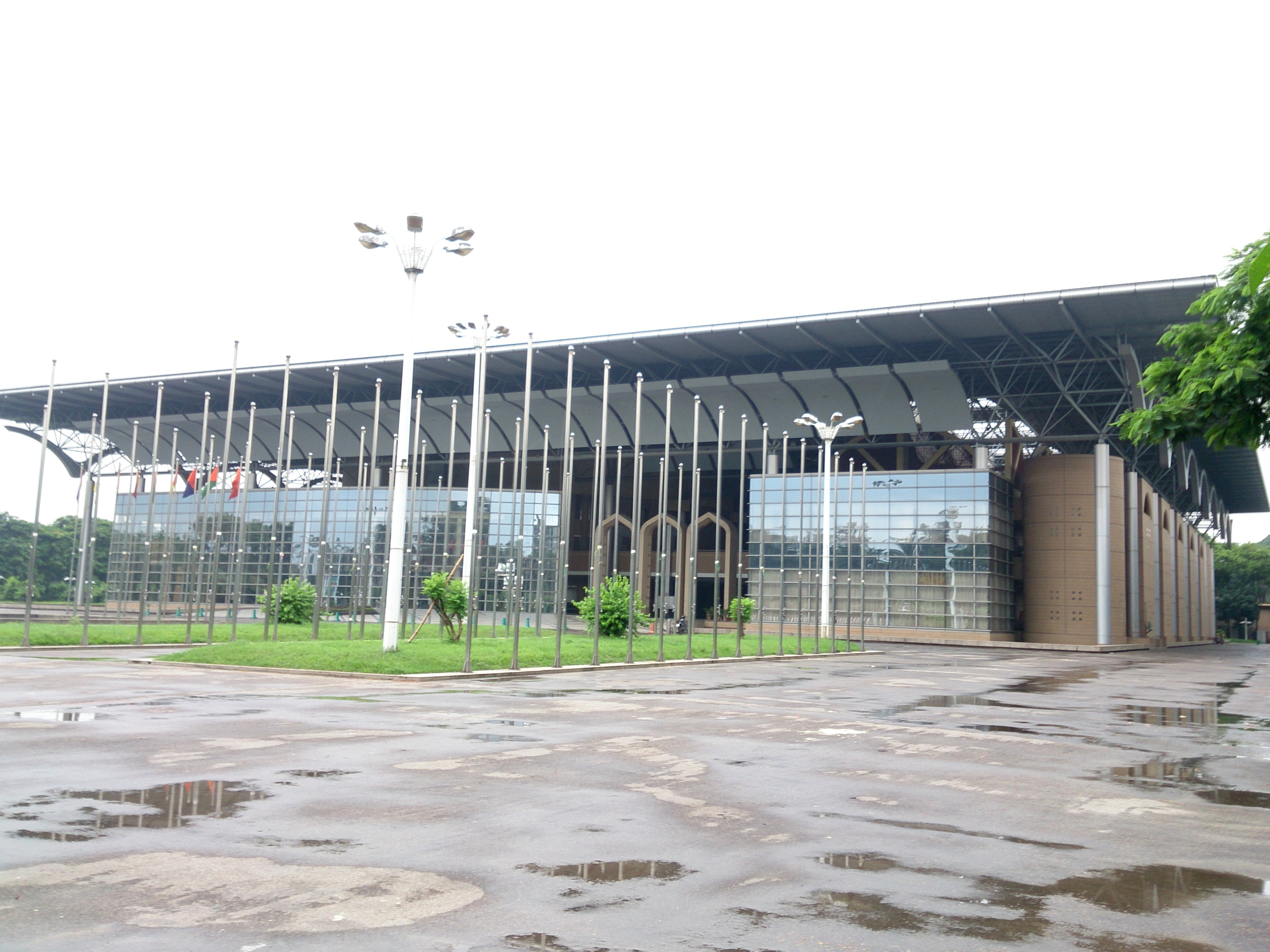
One side of the Conference Center
