= National Institute of Laboratory Medicine & Referral Centre =

Laboratory medicine institute in Dhaka, Bangladesh

- Abbreviation: NILMRC
- Formation: 2010
- Location: F/17-A, Sher-E-Bangla Nagar, Agargaon, Dhaka-1207, Bangladesh.
- Director: Mohammed Shahed Ali Jinnah
- Website: nilmrc.gov.bd

The National Institute of Laboratory Medicine & Referral Centre (NILMRC) is a state run academic institute for laboratory medicine in Agargaon, Dhaka.

== History ==
The project of the institute was approved by the ECNEC in June 2010. The 12-storey structure was completed in 2017. The initial budget of the project was Taka 138.14 crore, which has been increased by 41 percent to Taka 194.32 crore. Prime Minister Sheikh Hasina inaugurated the institute on 31 October 2018. But the institute was permitted to run from 2 December 2019.

Abul Khair Mohammad Shamsuzzaman served as the first director of the institute. On 24 April 2021, the head of the institute, A. K. M. Shamsuzzaman, died from COVID-19 complications. Current director is Mohammed Shahed Ali Jinnah.

== Facilities ==
Amid COVID-19 pandemic in Bangladesh, the institute is primarily active as a test center for COVID-19.
