= National Institute of Neurosciences & Hospital =

Research institute in Bangladesh

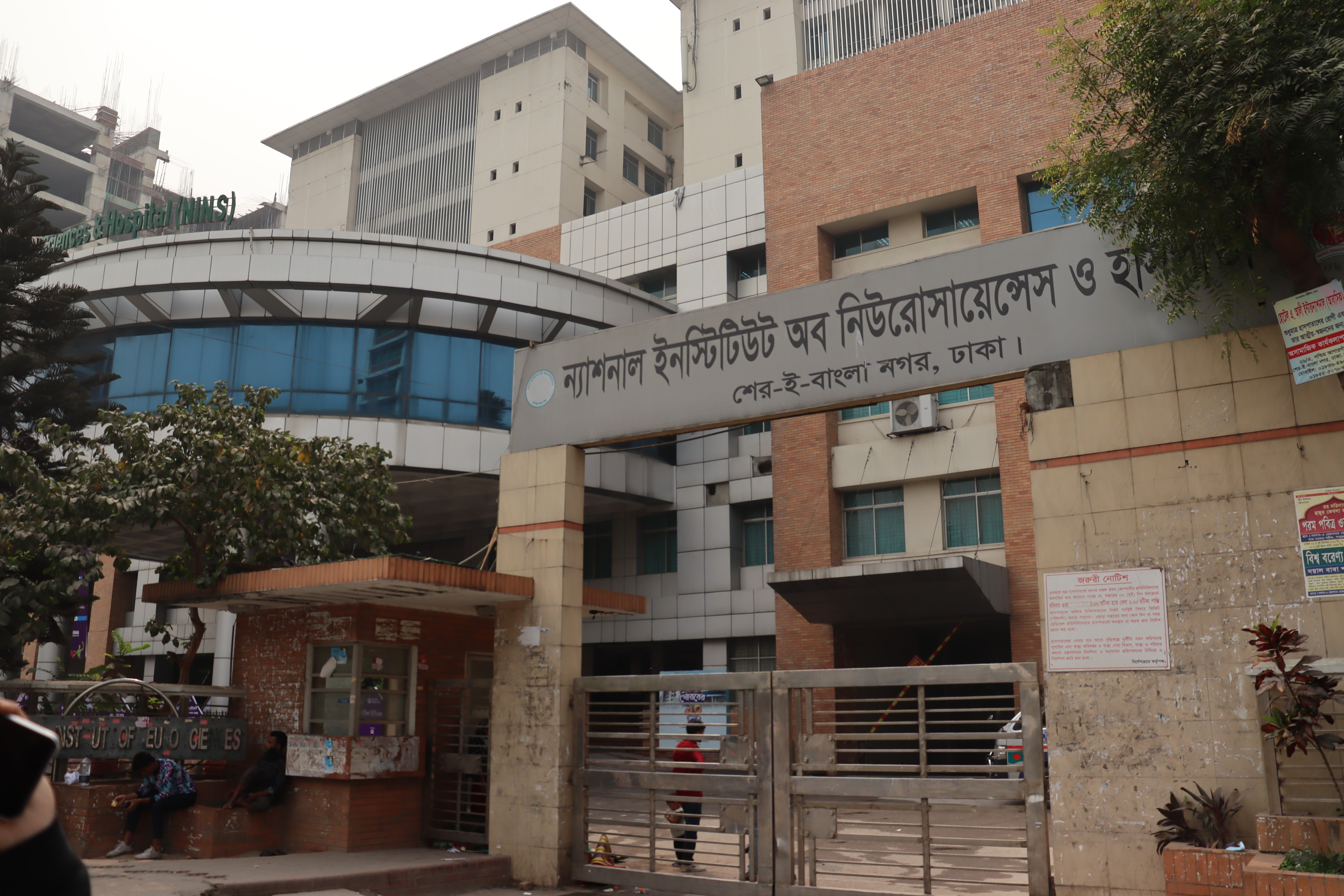
- Established: 2012
- Location: Sher-E-Bangla Nagar, Agargoan, Dhaka, Dhaka Division, Bangladesh
- Website: www.nins.gov.bd

National Institute of Neurosciences & Hospital (NINS) is a state-run tertiary care institute in Bangladesh focused on neurological disorders. It is located at Agargaon in Dhaka. Bangladeshi neurologist Prof Quazi Deen Mohammad was the founding director of this institute.

== History ==
Inaugurated by then Prime Minister Sheikh Hasina, the institute started its journey in September 2012.

== Administration ==
Director of NINS is the administrative chief of the institute. He is assisted by Joint Director, deputy director, assistant directors (Admin, Finance & Store). Administrative officers assist them in this task.

== Hospital facilities ==
It is a 450-bed hospital. Its ten-story building has six modern operation theaters, a 16-bed ICU, a 12-bed HDU, a six-bed Recovery Unit, and a 12-bed post-operative room. The hospital is equipped with the most modern radiology and imaging department. It has a 24/7 emergency unit.

== Hospital Services ==
There are a lot of Medical Technologist, So 24x7 diagnostic services (Blood, urine, ECG, CT Scan Etc.) are available.

== Publications ==
Journal of National Institute of Neurosciences Bangladesh is the official journal of NINS. It's launched in 2015 and publisbed biannually.
