= Sher-e-Bangla Nagar Government Boys' High School =

Sher-E-Bangla Nagar Government Boys' High School
- শেরেবাংলা নগর সরকারি বালক উচ্চ বিদ্যালয়
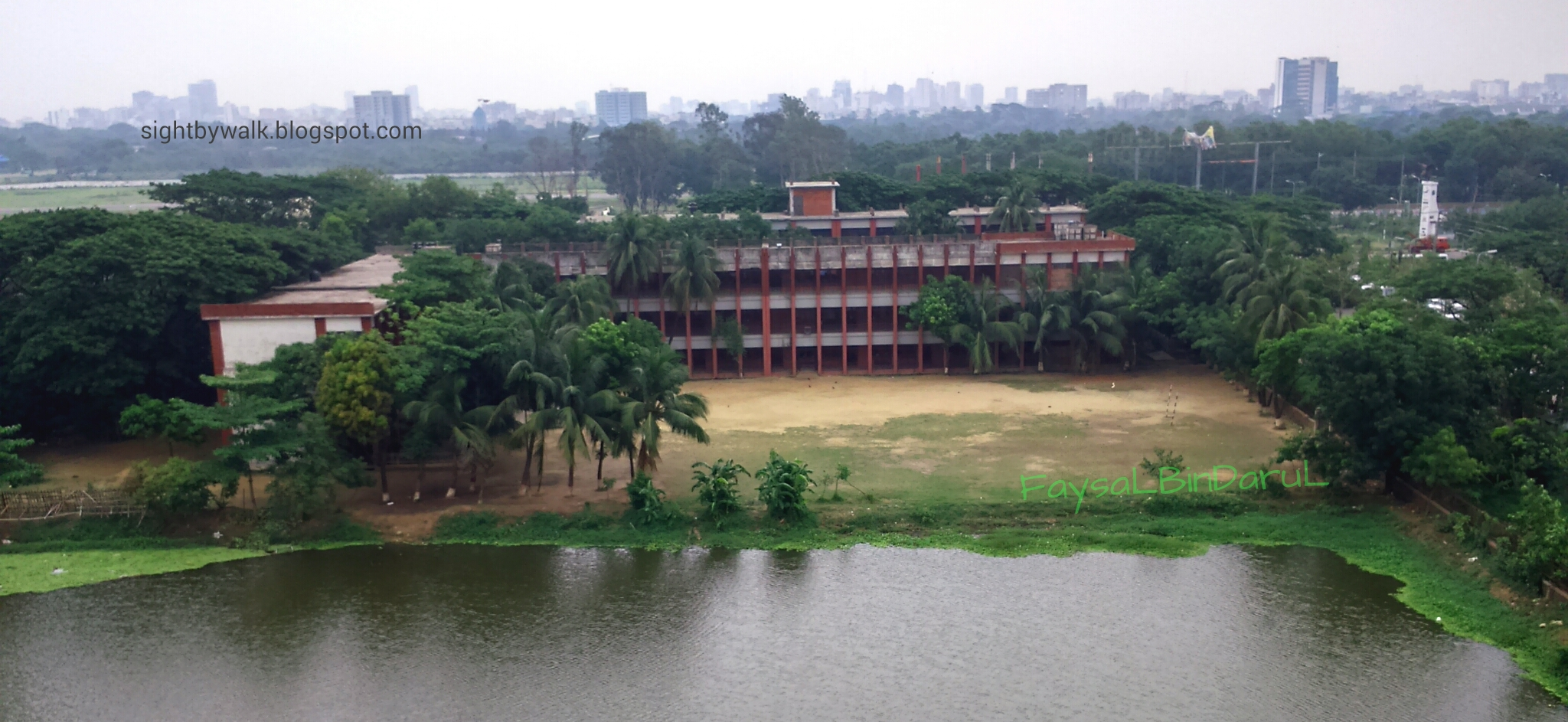

Location
- Agargaon, Dhaka; 1207; Bangladesh; 23.7775°N 90.3788°E

Information
- Type: Boys' School and College
- Established: 1969
- School board: Board of Intermediate and Secondary Education, Dhaka
- School code: 108241
- Grades: 1-12
- Gender: Male
- Website: www.sbngbhs.edu.bd

Sher-E-Bangla Nagar Government Boys' High School (Bengali: শেরেবাংলা নগর সরকারি বালক উচ্চ বিদ্যালয়) is a public secondary and higher secondary school located in Agargaon, Dhaka, Bangladesh. The school was established in 1969 as "Central Government Boys' High School". After the independence of Bangladesh in 1971, the name of the school was changed according to its local area. In addition to its high school curriculum, the school started college level education in 2008.

The school has been ranked in Group B due to its overall quality, facilities and performance in Dhaka city.

The school is used as a polling station. However, in the controversy in 2006 over election arrangements, this was one of the place where draft voter lists were not posted.

== Academic ==
=== Admission (Higher Secondary) ===
The college authority publishes an admission circular every year after the publication of the SSC results. New students are admitted to the 11th grade via online applications. They are admitted to the college according to the merit list based on their obtained marks in the SSC examinations.

=== Curriculum ===
The school follows the National Curriculum of studies. Higher secondary level: HSC – science (Bengali version) and business studies (Bengali version).

== Laboratories ==
Facilities include one computer lab, one advanced chemistry lab, one physics lab and one biology lab. The chemistry, physics and biology labs is used by the secondary and higher secondary students.
