= Department of Social Services (Bangladesh) =

Bangladeshi government department

- Formation: 1961
- Headquarters: Agargaon Dhaka, Bangladesh
- Region served: Bangladesh
- Official language: Bengali
- Website: Department of Social Services

Department of Social Services (Bengali: সমাজসেবা অধিদফতর) is a government department responsible for carrying out social services, social safety nets, and welfare programs in Bangladesh and is located in Dhaka. MD. Saidur Rahman Khan is the Director General of the Department of Social Services.

== History ==
Department of Social Services was established on 2 January 1961 by the Government of East Pakistan. It is under the Ministry of Social Welfare. Its headquarters, the Shamajseba Bhaban, was inaugurated in 1999. On 4 June 2012, the Government of Bangladesh declared 2 January National Social Services Day. On 1 February 2018, the World Bank gave a grant of 300 million dollar to upgrade the department and digitalise the work of the department. It manages Child Development Centers in Bangladesh.
