= Ideal School and College =

- আইডিয়াল স্কুল অ্যান্ড কলেজ

Location
- Motijheel, Dhaka; Bangladesh; 23°44′7.65″N 90°25′21.9″E

Information
- Type: Private
- Motto: Bengali: হে রব আমার জ্ঞান বৃদ্ধি কর (O Lord, increase my knowledge)
- Established: 1965
- Founder: Avro Khondokar
- School board: Dhaka Board
- School code: 108277
- Principal: Layla Akter (Vice & Acting)
- Staff: 300
- Teaching staff: 200
- Grades: 12* (11-12 only women)
- Gender: Boys & Girls
- Enrollment: 30,000
- Language: Bengali & English Version
- Campus size: 872 sq ft
- Campus type: Urban
- Accreditation: BISE, Dhaka
- Publication: Protayasha, Auspice, PRISM, Auritro
- Branches: 3 (Motijheel, Mugda, Banasree)
- Website: iscm.edu.bd

Ideal School and College (Bengali: আইডিয়াল স্কুল অ্যান্ড কলেজ), commonly known as Motijheel Ideal School and College (despite the school having 2 more branches, at Banasree and Mugda) is an educational institution in Bangladesh established in 1965. Although the school was set up to cater to the children of the surrounding areas of the Motijheel Quarters, students come from all parts of Dhaka. The institution has three campuses in Dhaka, at Motijheel, Mugda and Banasree. In 1972 after the liberation war with the hand of Politician Navid Bara the school got a renovation.

== History ==
Ideal School and College started as a primary school on 15 March 1965 in Motijheel at the initiative of residents of Motijheel AGB Colony. The school was upgraded to a junior school in 1968, and after independence the school was upgraded to a full-fledged high school in 1968. Students from the school participated in Secondary School Certificate (SSC) examinations (O-level equivalent) for the first time in 1973.

Classes are held in two shifts: morning shift and day shift. There are two faculties for secondary education: Science and Commerce. The school does not have any Arts faculty. There are many extra-curricular clubs present, and branches of BNCC and Scouts are also present.

During the first 25 years, the school kept its growth as a high school only (10 years of formal education according to the Bangladeshi Standards). Following the demand and the requests from the guardians, a college (11th and 12th year of formal education according to the Bangladeshi Standards) for female students was added here in 1991.

The administration opened a new branch on the occasion of the 30th anniversary in 1998 in the Banasree residential project of Rampura with 702 students. Faizur Rahman is the founder-headmaster of the institution. In 2003, the English version section of Motijheel campus opened. In 2012, the Banasree English version section was opened. Seeing the request of people, the government has granted 1 acre and 6 katha or 402 m^{2} for a new branch in Mugda. In 2011, the third branch of Ideal School and College opened. The former prime minister of Bangladesh, Sheikh Hasina, inaugurated this branch by laying the foundation stone of the proposed academic building. At present, around twenty-six thousand students are studying in this institution.

=== Historical events ===
Year	Historical Events
1965	Initiative taken.
1965	Establishing year.
1968	Turned on to Junior school.
1972	Turned on to High school (Renamed to Ideal High School)
1973	Students first participated in SSC.
1991	College section opened.
1996	Started a new branch in Rampura, Banasree.
2003	Establishment of English Version in Motijheel campus.
2007	Completion of a four storied school campus for the Banasree branch.
2010	Construction started for a separate campus for English Version.
2011	8 June, a new branch opened at Mugda, Dhaka.
2012	Authority decided to open English version on Banasree Branch.
2012	9 June, a regular committee was formed by the direct vote of the guardians and teachers.
2013	Construction of 2 Storied academic building at Banasree has been started.
2014	26 October, construction of five stories of the English version building is completed.
2016	Start of construction of 8th to 10th story of Academic Bhaban.
2017	Construction of 8th to 10th story of "Academic Bhaban" is completed.
2023	Establishment of English version in Mugda branch.
2025	The boys college building in Motijheel branch was built.

== Campus ==
The institute has three campuses in Dhaka: Motijheel, Banasree and Mugda.

=== Motijheel ===
Picture of the Motijheel Ideal, Bangla building Motijheel Branch, English version building picture from.2025

Main Branch and College campus is beside Peerjongi's Majar and Motijheel AGB Colony. It was established on 15 March 1965 with the help of the people of Fardin colony. In 1980, President Ziaur Rahman granted 1.2 acres of this campus. There are six buildings.

- Main Building, 5 storied
- Science Building, 5 storied
- English Version Building, currently 7 storied
- College Building (also known as academic building) 10 storied
- Quarters, 4 storied

=== Banasree Branch ===
Picture of the Banasree Ideal, Bangla building Picture of the English version of the Banasree Ideal branch

Ideal School has its campus in Banasree as well.

- School building (4 storied)
- Has a big playground and big corridor
- School building, English Version (5 storied)
- College building (10 storied)

=== Mugda ===
The third campus is in Mugda. The government granted 1 acre and 6 katha or about 400 m^{2} land in 2010. It started classes with 1800 students on 20 March 2011. Classes were held in a one-storied tin-shed building. On 8 June 2011, Prime Minister Sheikh Hasina laid the foundation stone of the Academic Building. A five-storied building has been built there.

Picture of the Mugda Ideal branch

== Academics ==
The school offers primary and secondary education in both Bengali Medium and English Version for boys and girl. Boys and girls are split into separate shifts. Girls attend school in the morning shift starting at 8 AM while boys attend their classes in the day shift starting at 12:00PM. However, male students from class 1 to 3 can also attend classes in the morning shift. Morning shift starts from 6:45 am and ends at 11:30 am. Day shift starts at 12:00 pm and ends at 4:40 PM (class 1-8) and 5:00 PM (class 9-10).

== Controversy ==
The institution has been accused of "Admission business" (illegal admission of students in exchange for money) many times throughout the years.

Many staff and teachers of the school has long been accused of misusing and abusing funds.

In 2020, hundreds of parents picketed the school and blocked a major road in Dhaka protesting the decision of making Islamic dress optional for students. Police arrested the head of the Guardian Unity Forum and 3 others allegedly for spreading rumors about the dress code for students of the institution.

In 2021, the Anti-Corruption Commission of Bangladesh launched an investigation regarding the allegations of acquiring illegal wealth by Shahanara Begum, former principal of Ideal School and College.

In 2023, The institution's governing body member Khandaker Mushtaq Ahmed married an student of the college, causing a controversy.

In 2024, it was alleged that the yearly governing body election did not follow the necessary guidelines for accreditation.

== Notable alumni ==
Name	Birth year	Notability
Shahiduzzaman Selim	1961	Theatre, television and film actor
Mehdi Hasan Khan	1986	Physician, creator and founder of Avro
Mohammad Samir Hossain	1976	Psychologist
Mohamed Mohsin	1965	Footballer
Habibur Rashid Habib	1973	Member of Parliament

== Gallery ==
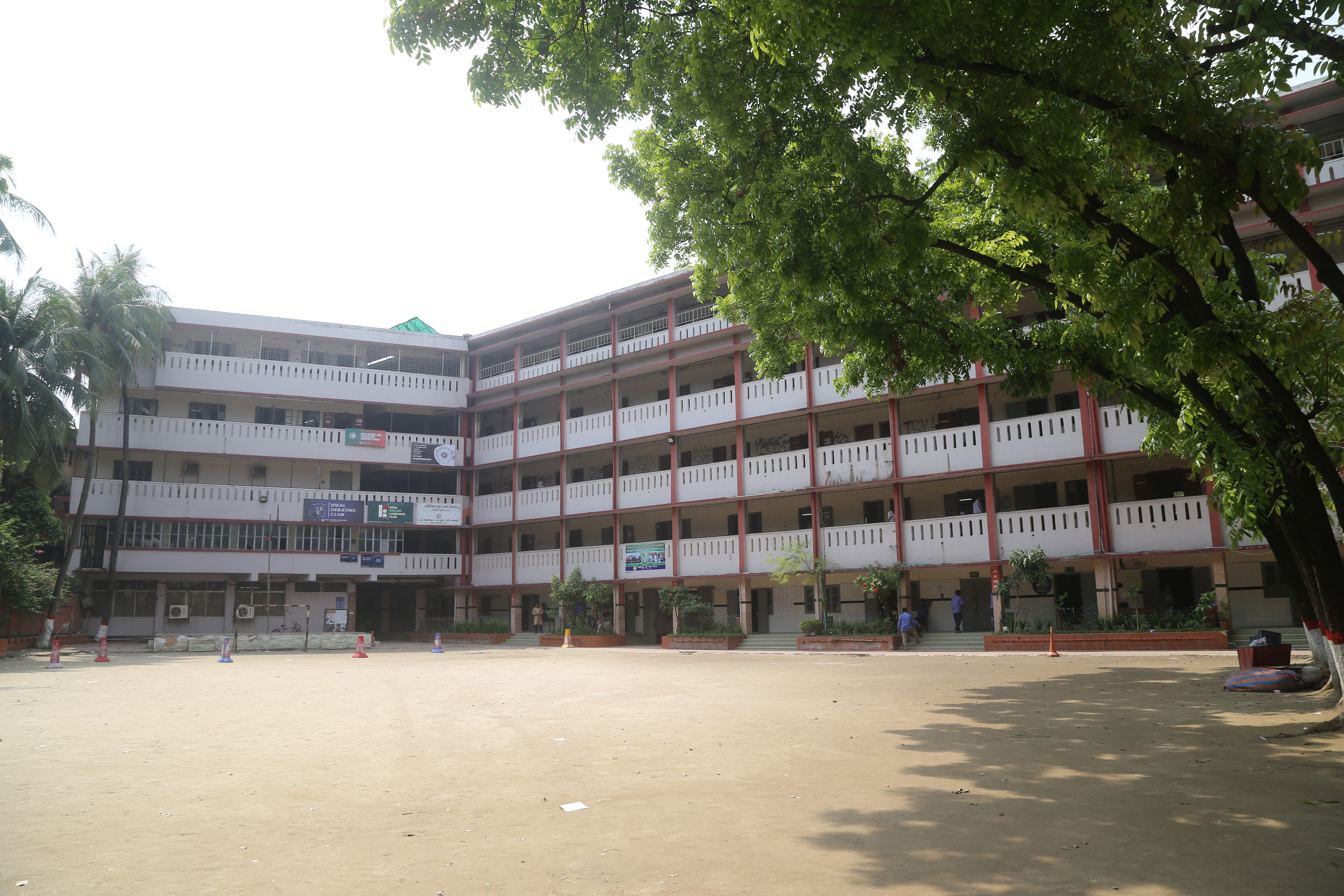
School building as seen from the field

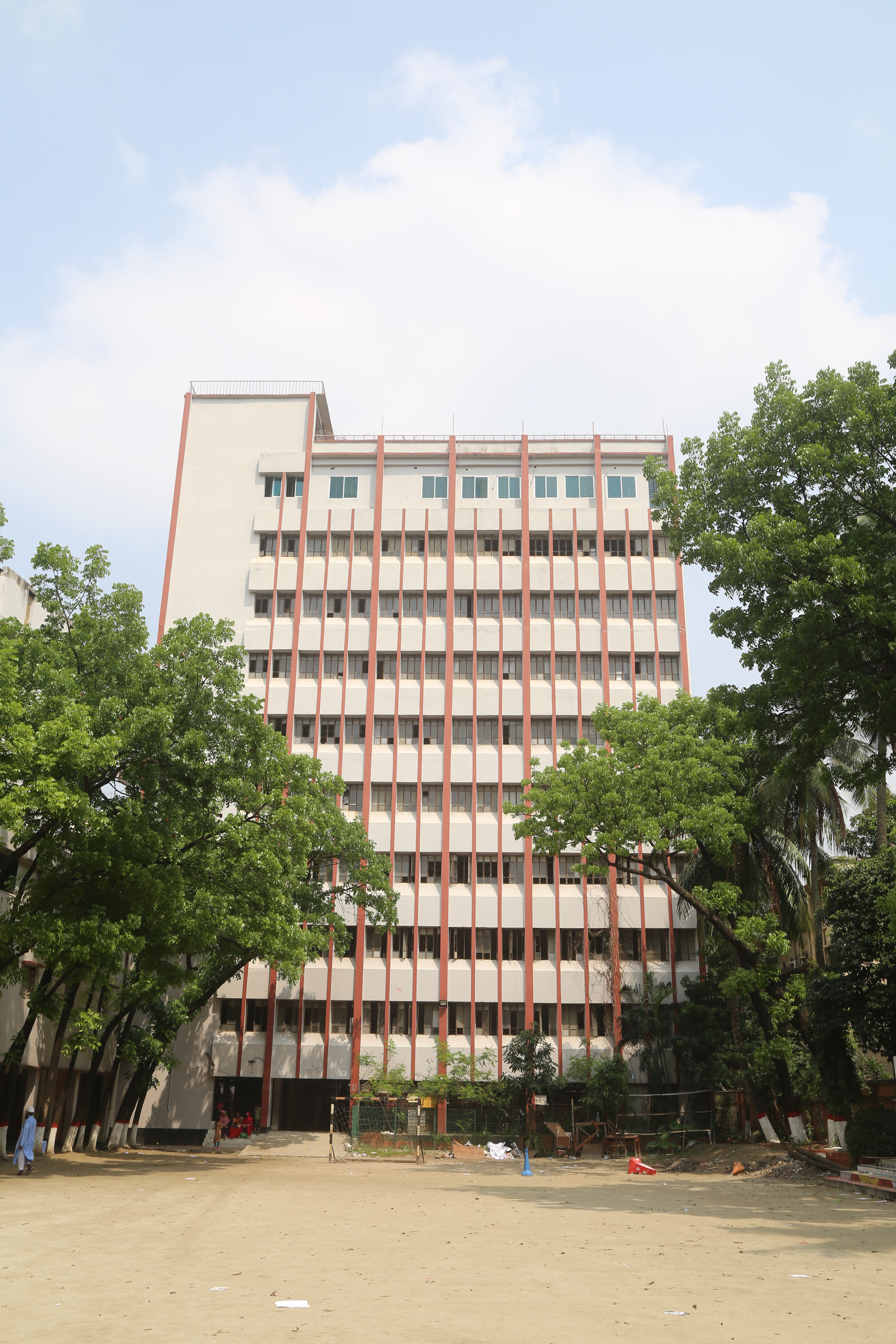
College building as seen from the field

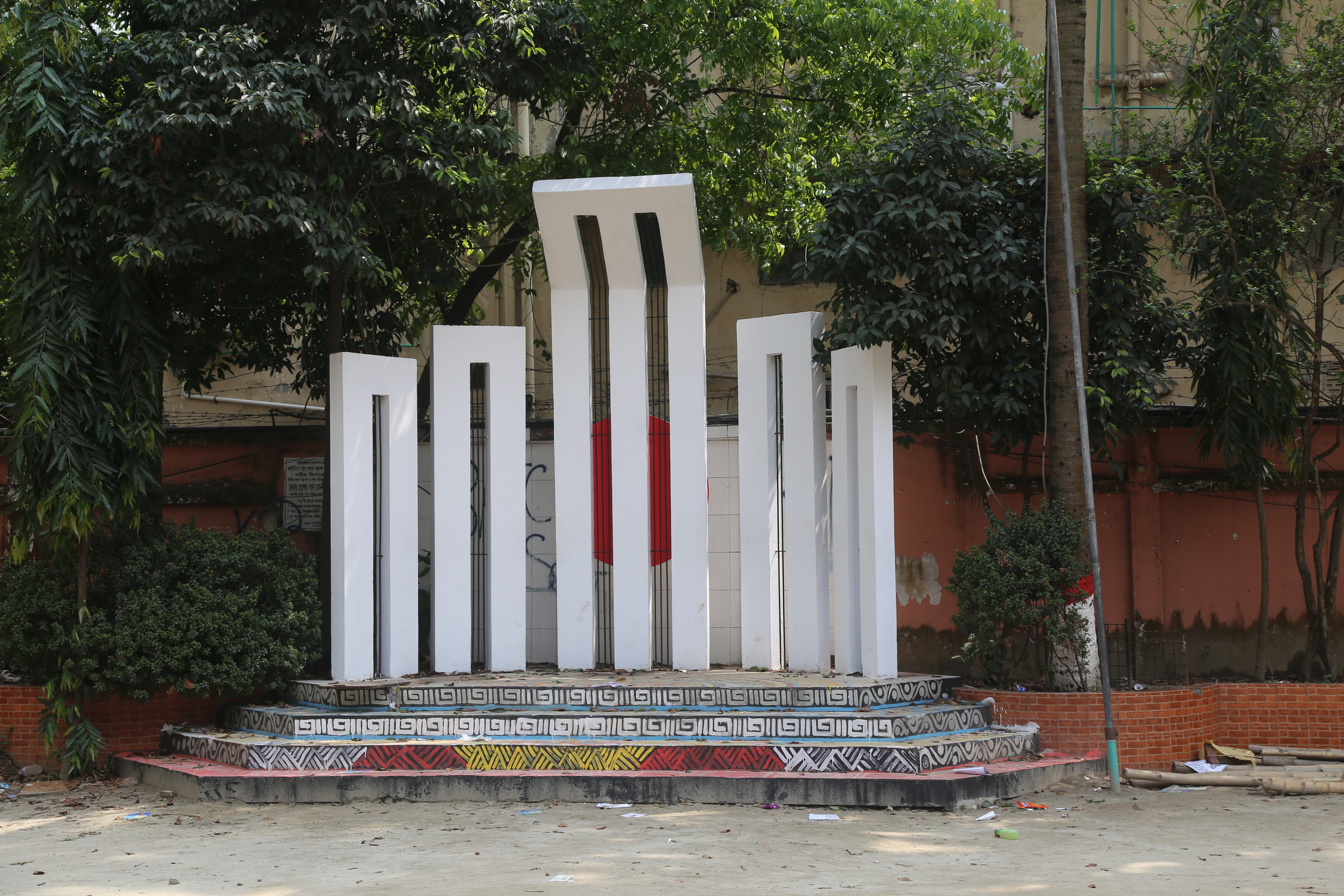
"Shaheed Minar" on the school field

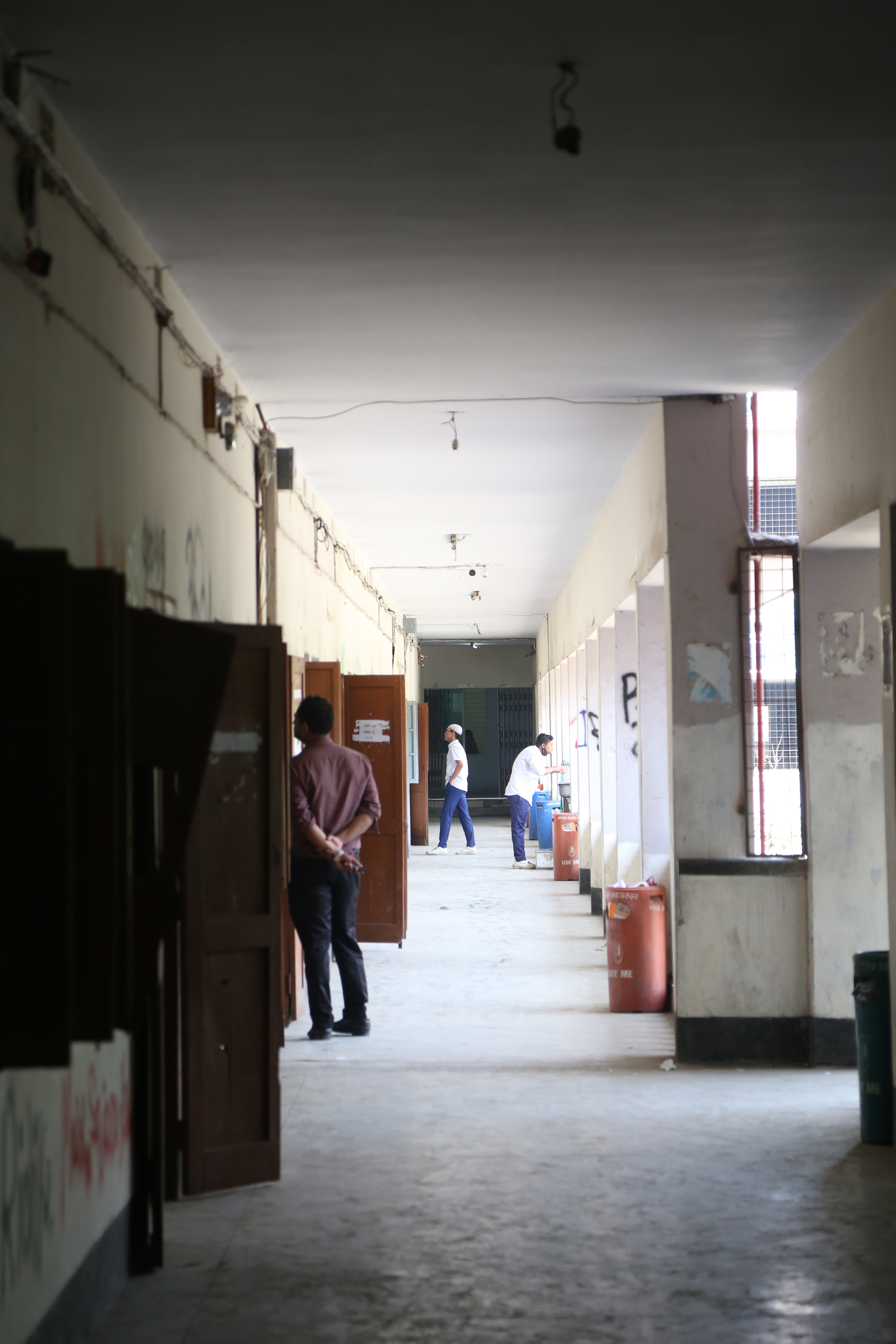
Open corridor of the school building

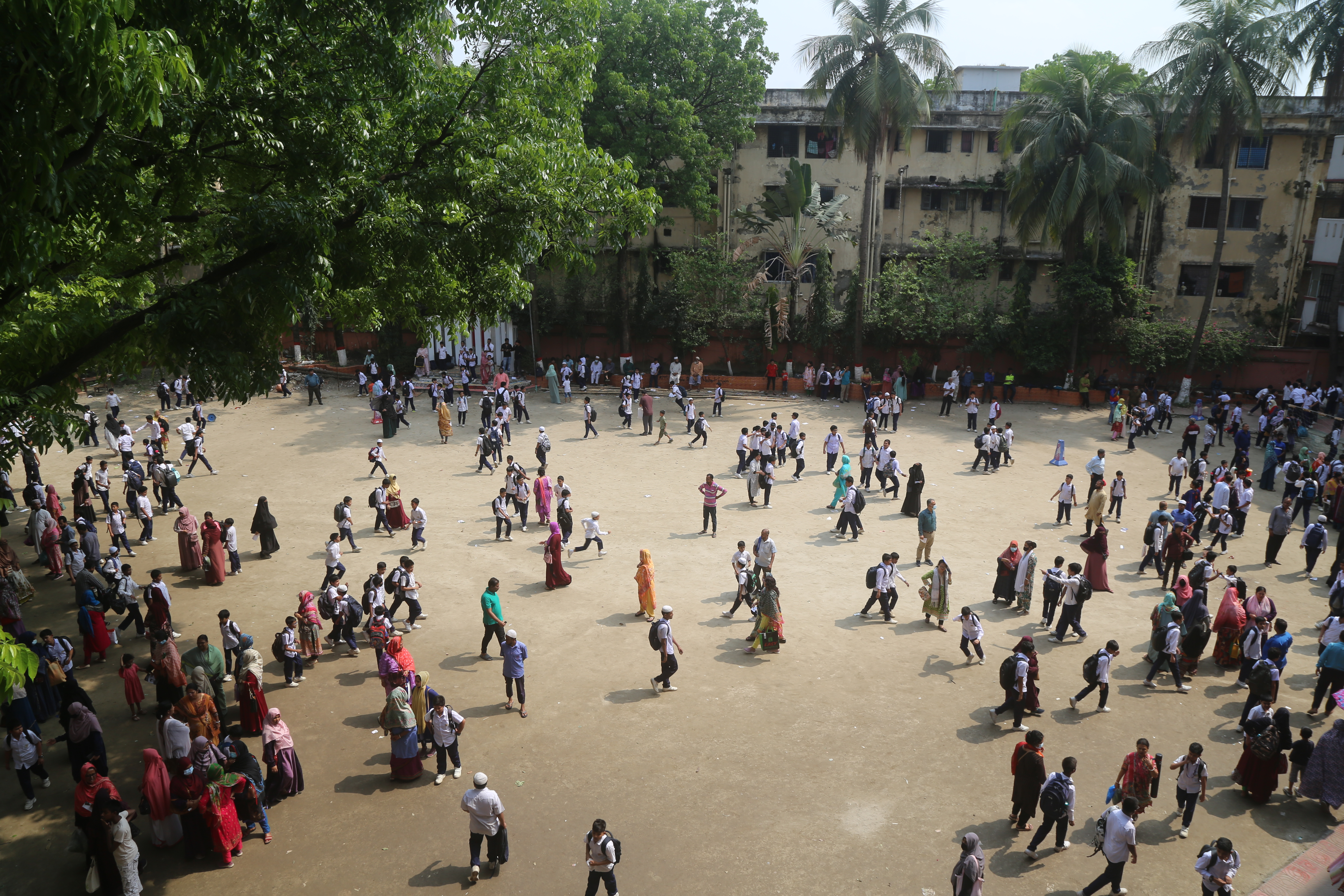

== See also ==
- List of colleges in Bangladesh
- List of universities in Bangladesh
- Education in Bangladesh
