= Death and adjustment hypotheses =

Psychological theory about death

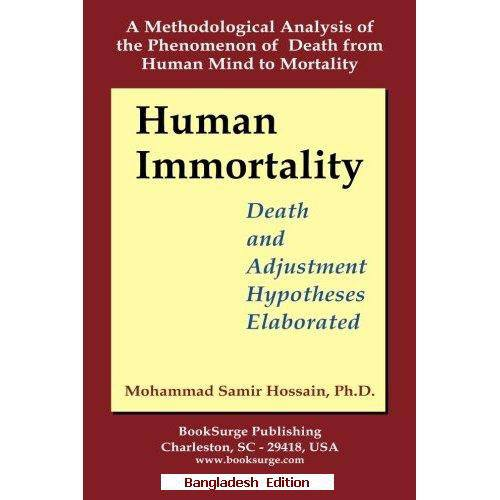
The text book 'Human Immortality' that elaborates DAH and issues related to it

Death and adjustment hypotheses (DAH) is a theory about death and dying that focuses on death anxiety and adjustment to death. It was presented by Mohammad Samir Hossain as an answer to the overwhelming anxiety and grief about death. In an attempt to find the resolution to death anxiety, predominantly the existential one, DAH postulates two key themes. Its first part postulates that death should not be considered the end of existence and the second part emphasizes that the belief in immortal pattern of human existence can only be adopted in a morally rich life with the attitude towards morality and materialism balanced mutually.

== Beginning ==
The theory was first promoted in the book Quest for a New Death: Death and Adjustment Hypotheses in 2007. A second book with its elaboration, Human Immortality: Death and Adjustment Hypotheses Elaborated, was published in 2008. Both books were authored by Hossain. Later the journal Death Studies and Royal College of Psychiatrists reviewed these publications for the readerships in Scientific Thanatology and Spiritual Psychiatry. After the analyses of the reviewers were published, the Royal College of Psychiatrists at London published the theory itself as the short article Facing the Finality: Death and Adjustment Hypotheses and the Taylor & Francis publication Journal of Loss and Trauma did the same in its article "Introducing Death and Adjustment Hypotheses".

== Background ==
Hossain was intolerant to death himself. His childhood was terrified with the anticipatory thoughts of his parents' death. When his elder son Mohammad Seeyam Samir died, parallel to developing support for himself, Hossain decided to put forward his resolutions for death anxiety and grief through the scientific readerships. His research works during and after that period gave birth to the articles and books that he later published promoting the theory and for sufferers of intense death anxiety. Hossain's works on the theory further flourished as his parents' terminal illnesses appeared and compelled him to adjust himself comprehensively to the phenomenon of death for a peaceful personal life. He admitted in one of his autobiographical articles that without the turmoils in his own life he could never realize about the disasters and work to prevent them.

== Key components ==
Factors behind the DAH are described in European Psychiatry, Volume 26, Supplement 1, Page 1727 in the following manner –

"Viewed from a naturalistic and scientific perspective, death appears to represent the permanent cessation of human existence, contributing to the widespread experience of death anxiety. The present argument attempts to deconstruct this argument on epistemological grounds by analyzing 1) the prevailing universal concept of death in naturalistic discourse,
2) the issue of our adjustment to this presumed reality, and
3) the relationship between existence and death in the context of their social evolution.
Integrating this conceptual analysis with empirical observations, the paper then explores the contrasting postulate, namely that death may not be the end of our existence, and the moral implications of this alternative assumption. This position, termed the "death adjustment hypotheses," would seem to offer an alternative grounding for theory and research in Thanatology."

=== Concept of death ===
Finding a common platform regarding the concept of death was the first step towards this work. Dr Hossain's finding was that without a common idea about death people will not be able to share the same remedy for death anxiety. There are many scientific approaches to the concept. For example, brain death, as practiced in medical science, defines death as a point in time at which brain activity ceases. It was Hossain's claim that whenever death is taken as permanent and absolute cessation of human existence, morbid fear of death begins; therefore DAH he presented with different ideas of death in relation to existence to reach a conclusion that will be acceptable to most.

=== Death anxiety as a whole ===
Death anxiety is the central concern of DAH. It is the morbid, abnormal or persistent fear of one's own death or the process of his/her dying. One definition of death anxiety is a "feeling of dread, apprehension or solicitude (anxiety) when one thinks of the process of dying, or ceasing to ‘be’". It is also referred to as thanatophobia (fear of death), and is distinguished from necrophobia, which is a specific fear of dead or dying persons and/or things (i.e. others who are dead or dying, not one's own death or dying). DAH proposes that no one is free from this anxiety unless there is something significantly positive in the phenomenon of death for humans. Hossain claimed, the idea of 'cessation of existence' through death is the prime factor responsible for initiating death anxiety in one.

=== Existential death anxiety ===
It is apparent that Hossain's description of death anxiety in DAH actually overlaps the idea of existential death anxiety, which is the basic knowledge and awareness that life must end. However, DAH indicates 'existence' as the primary humane need and 'pleasure' as the secondary one. Therefore, DAH postulates, though existential death anxiety strongly correlates behavioral changes, pleasure in existence must be ensured to maintain the balance between life and death peacefully. Hossain, in the iteration of DAH, highlighted how this sort of death anxiety evolved in the society through time based on his analysis of the history of the West starting from 5th century up to 20th century. DAH adds that assurance of pleasure or pain-free status in any existence after death is another key factor in adjusting with the phenomenon of death even if one is not overwhelmed by existential death anxiety due to his/her belief in any sort of existence after death.

=== Materialism, immorality and judgment issues ===
Hossain explained, as existence after death creates the scope for being judged and punished for the immoral deeds in life, most self-claimed believers pass through the denial of afterlife for their immorality in search of limitless materialistic pleasure. Therefore, one of the key propositions of DAH was that mostly humans abandon their moral ethics due to heightened materialism that gives birth to existential death anxiety even among the self-claimed believers in the existence after death.

== Declarations of the Death and adjustment hypotheses ==
As outlined very briefly in journal articles, DAH hypothesizes the following for optimum attitude towards death as well as to harmonize the adjustment problems in relation to the phenomenon:

- Death and Adjustment Hypotheses – One: In the absence of empirical evidence from science, to regard death to be not our absolute end seems natural and is an epistemologically sound point of view. Therefore, it is also more useful practically and for our adjustment to the phenomenon.
- Death and Adjustment Hypotheses – Two: Changing our materialistic view to a moral one on life can help eradicate the social denial of death through the establishment of a sound concept of the phenomenon at personal and societal level, which should also potentate our adjustment to the phenomenon.

== See also ==
- Death
