= Mugda Medical College & Hospital =

Government medical college in Mugda, Dhaka

Mugda Medical College
- মুগদা মেডিকেল কলেজ
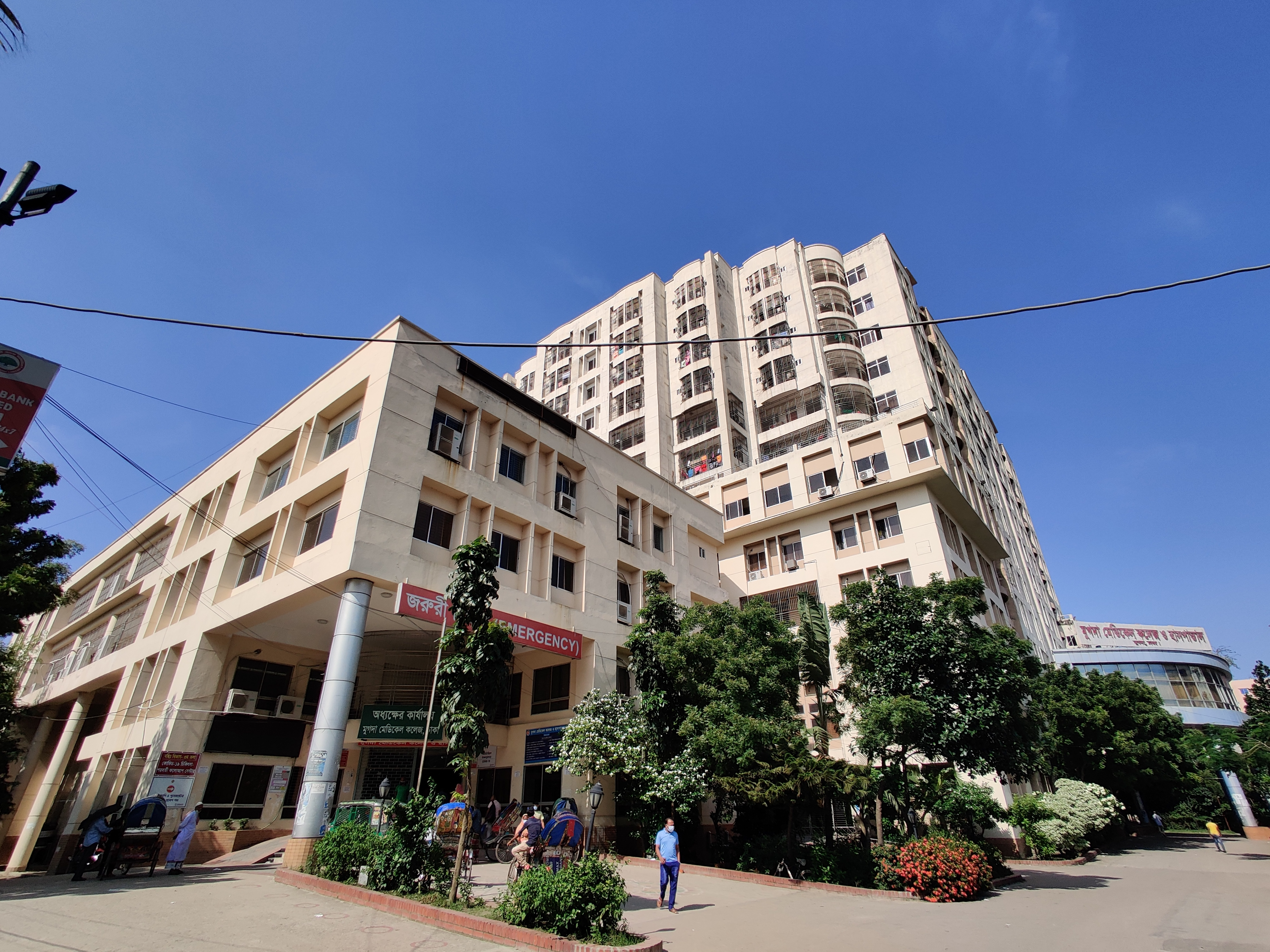
- Other names: MuMC
- Former names: Mugda General Hospital
- Type: Public medical school and hospital
- Established: 2015; 11 years ago
- Academic affiliations: University of Dhaka
- Principal: Dr. Md. Mosharraf Hossain (Acting)
- Students: 355
- Location: Hazi Kadam Ali Road, Mugda, Dhaka, Bangladesh
- Campus: Urban, 10.2 acres (4.1 ha)
- Language: English
- Website: mumc.gov.bd

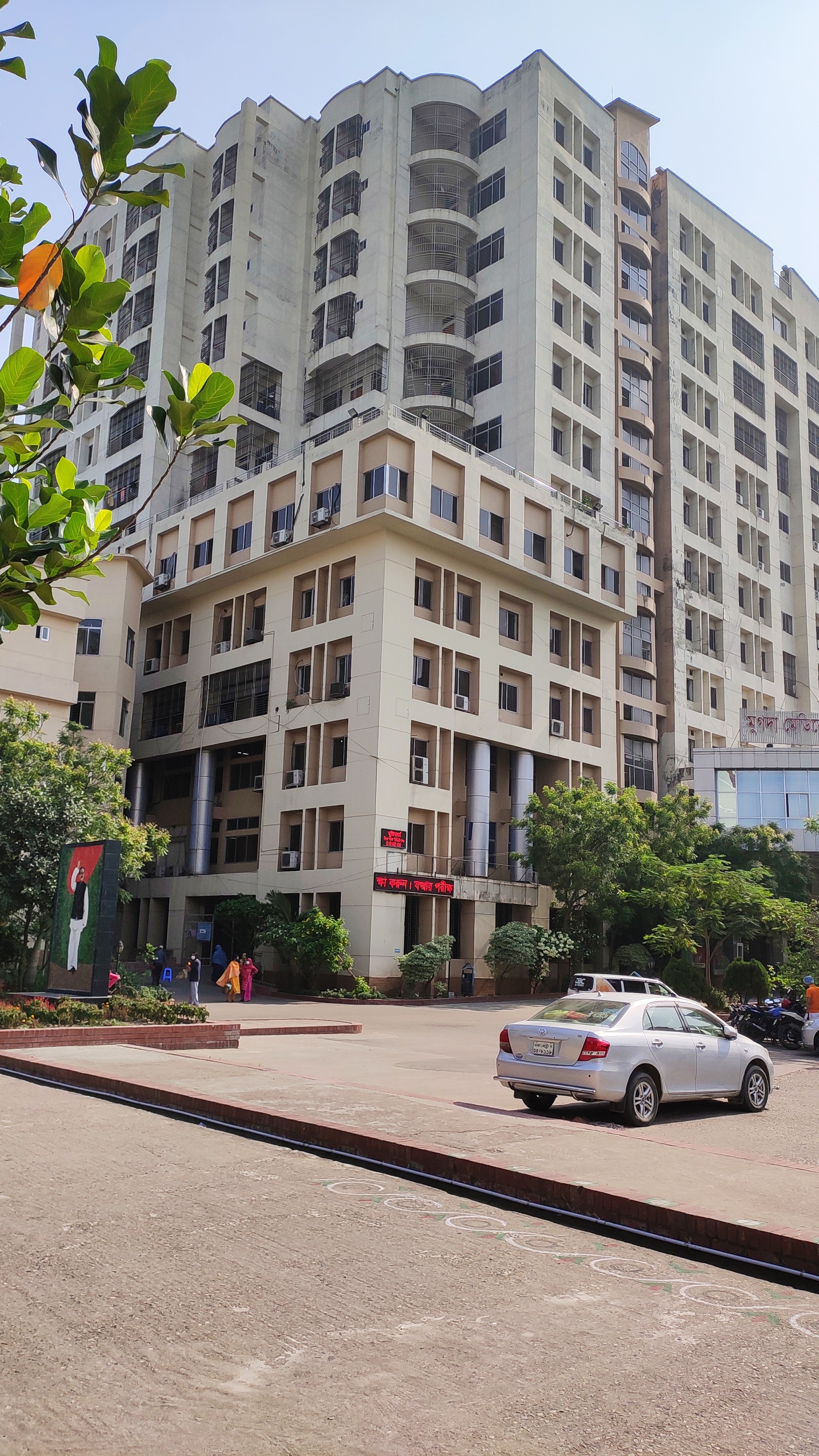
Mugda Medical College

Mugda Medical College & Hospital is a public medical college and 500-bed healthcare facility in Dhaka.

The facility began as a general hospital and was later turned into a full-fledged medical school. Construction began in 2006. The hospital opened in July 2013, and started admitting patients in early 2014. It includes a 13-story building on 9.5 acres (3.8 ha).

It is the fourth government medical college inside Dhaka metropolitan city. From the first month of 2016, it started classes of regular MBBS course with the admission of 50 students in the first year, which has increased to 100 students every year.

== Principals ==
SI	Name	From	To
1.	Dr. Shah Golam Nabi	2015	2020
2.	Dr. Titu Miah	2020	2021
3.	Dr. Ahmedul Kabir	2021	2021
4.	Dr. Abul Bashar Md. Jamal	2021	2023
5.	Dr. Md Mustafizur Rahman	2023	2026
6.	Dr. Md Mostafizur Rahman	2026	2026
7.	Dr. Md Mosharraf Hossain	2026	Present

== Campus ==
Under the college building, there are three lecture galleries with AC, multimedia and other modern facilities, a library, conference room and various laboratories, dissection rooms, practical rooms, and tutorial rooms. Two lecture galleries are situated on the fourth floor of the emergency building, and one gallery is on the fourth floor of the hospital building. The current college building is situated on the second, third and fourth floors of the emergency building.

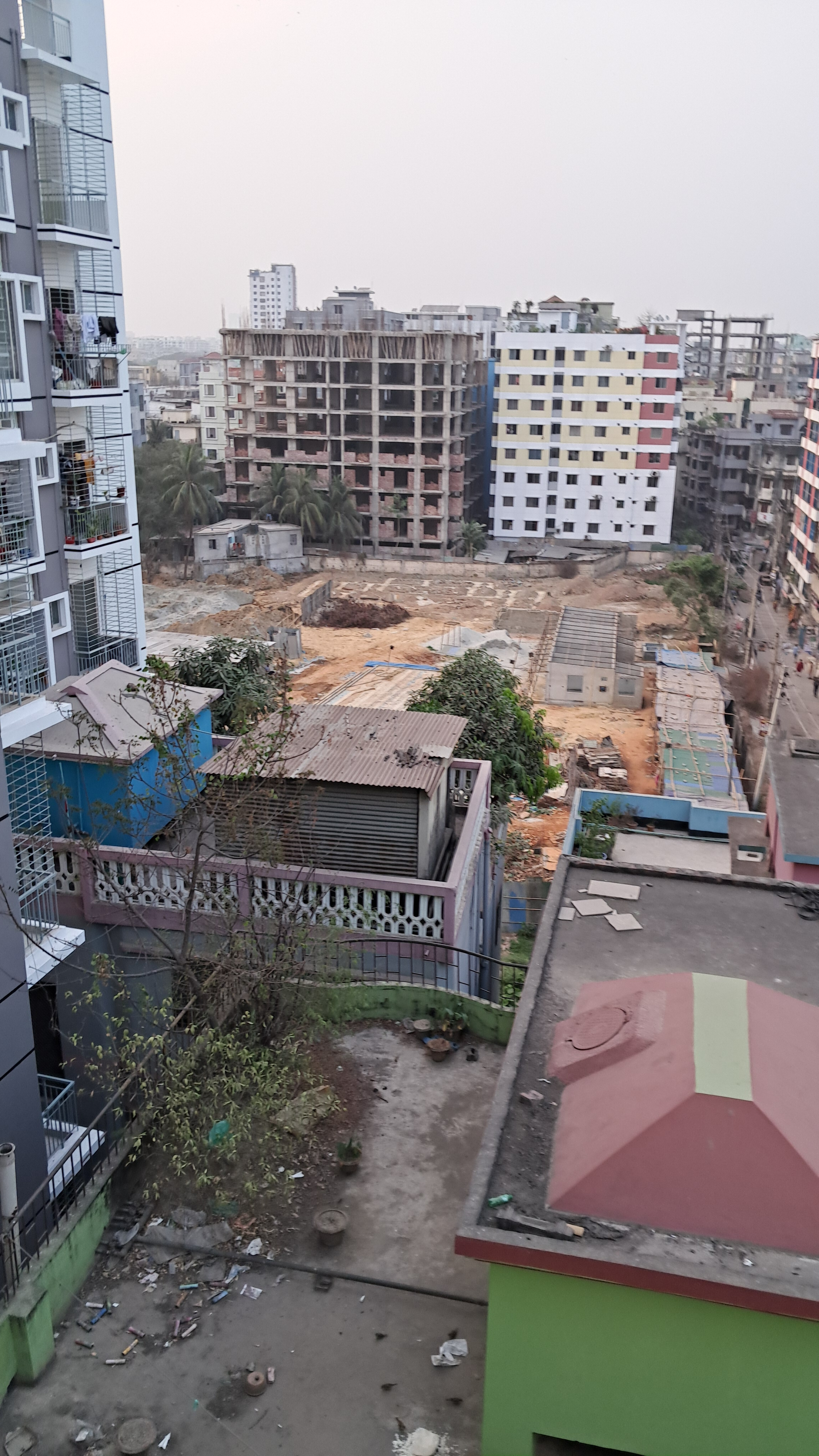
A picture taken from a roof of an apartment shows the recent buildation of new buildings. Picture taken in April, 2025

=== Library ===
Mugda Medical College has a library on the third floor of the hospital building beside the anatomy department. It has all types of books for MBBS and BDS curriculum. Students can borrow any book. There is also a well furnished reading room.

=== Canteen ===
There is one canteen for students on the fourth floor of the college building.

=== Hostel facilities ===
As Mugda Medical College is newly established, it does not have a separate hostel building yet. It does have an accommodation system for both male and female students. The boys' hostel is on the fourth floor of the hospital building. It has all the facilities for the accommodation of seniors and juniors. The girls' hostel is on the twelfth floor of the hospital building. There are two hostel units on the 12th floor. First year students are accommodated in four hall rooms, each having seats for eight to ten students. Senior students are allotted to the cabins, each having seats for two to three students, with an attached bathroom and a balcony. The hostel is free for the students.

== Gallery ==
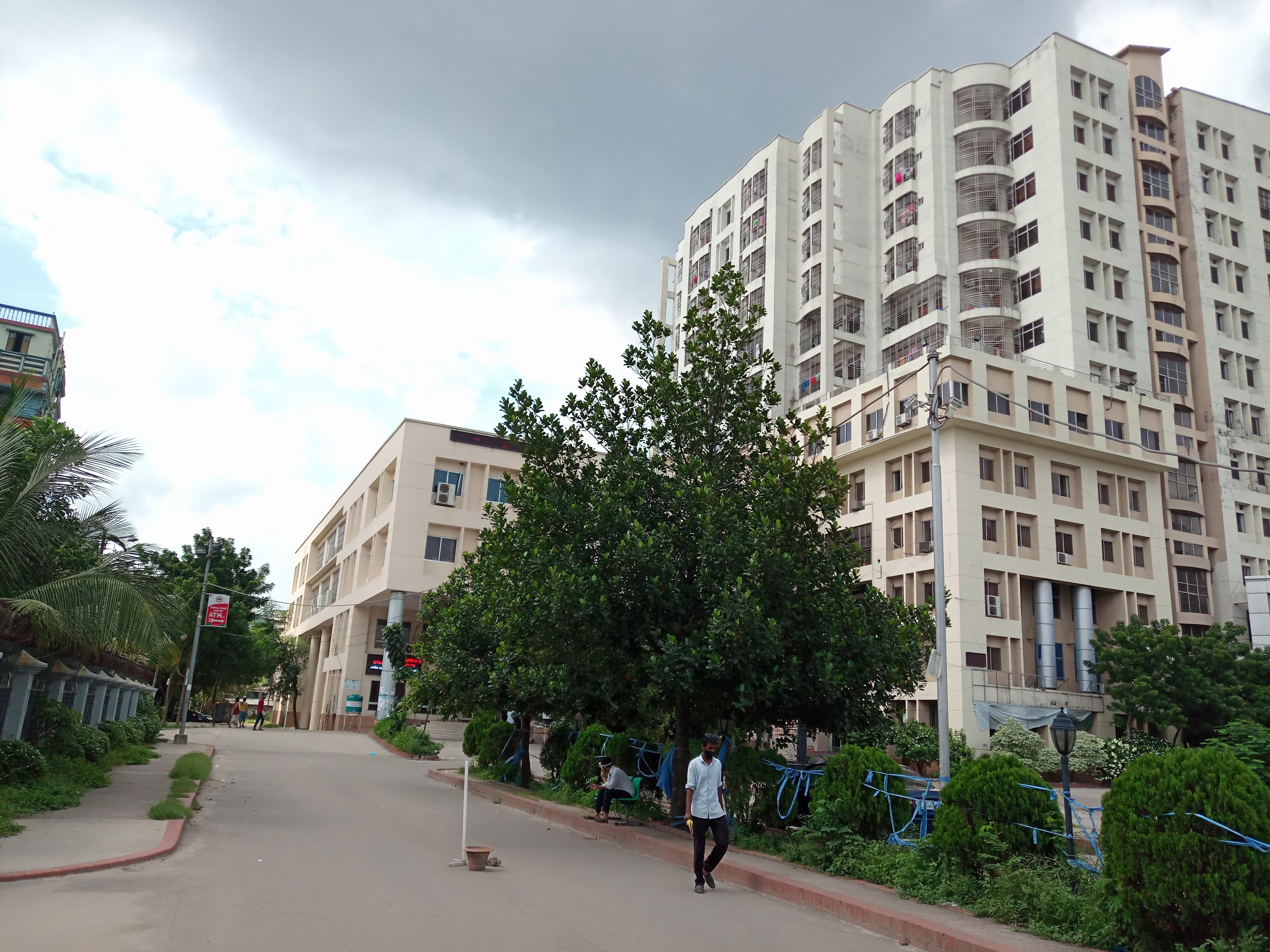
Mugda Medical College and Hospital

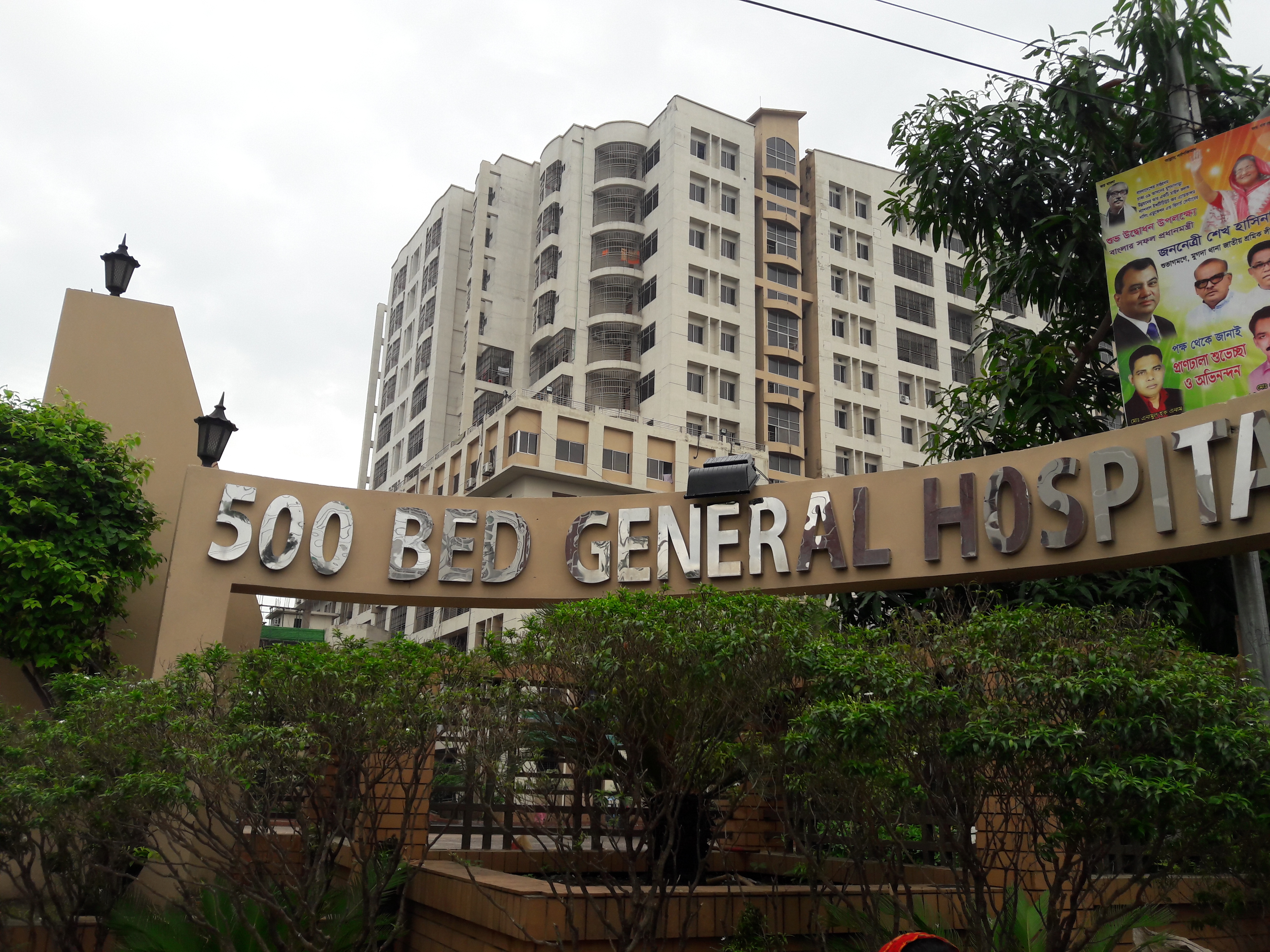
Mugda Medical College

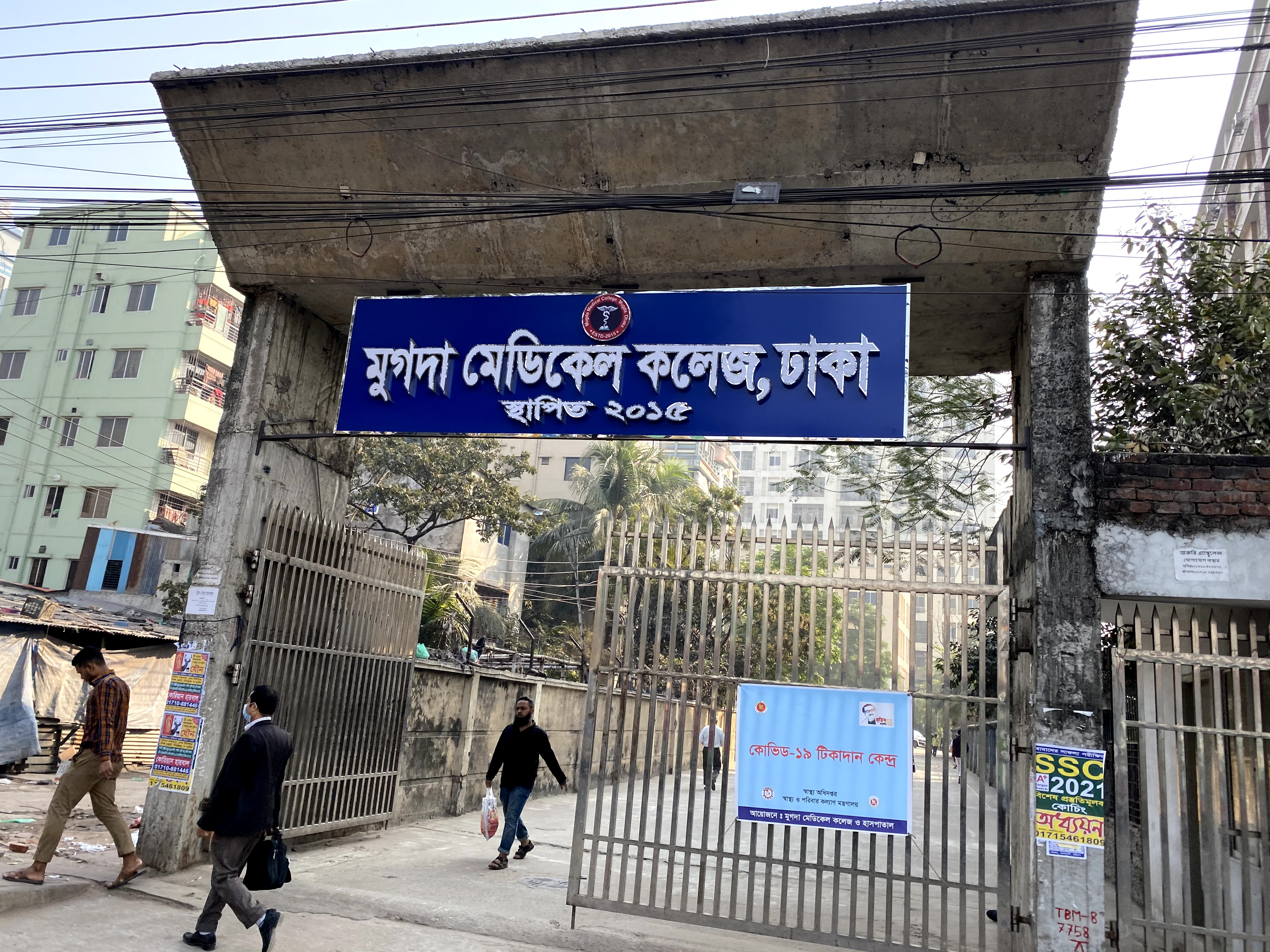
Mugda Medical College entrance

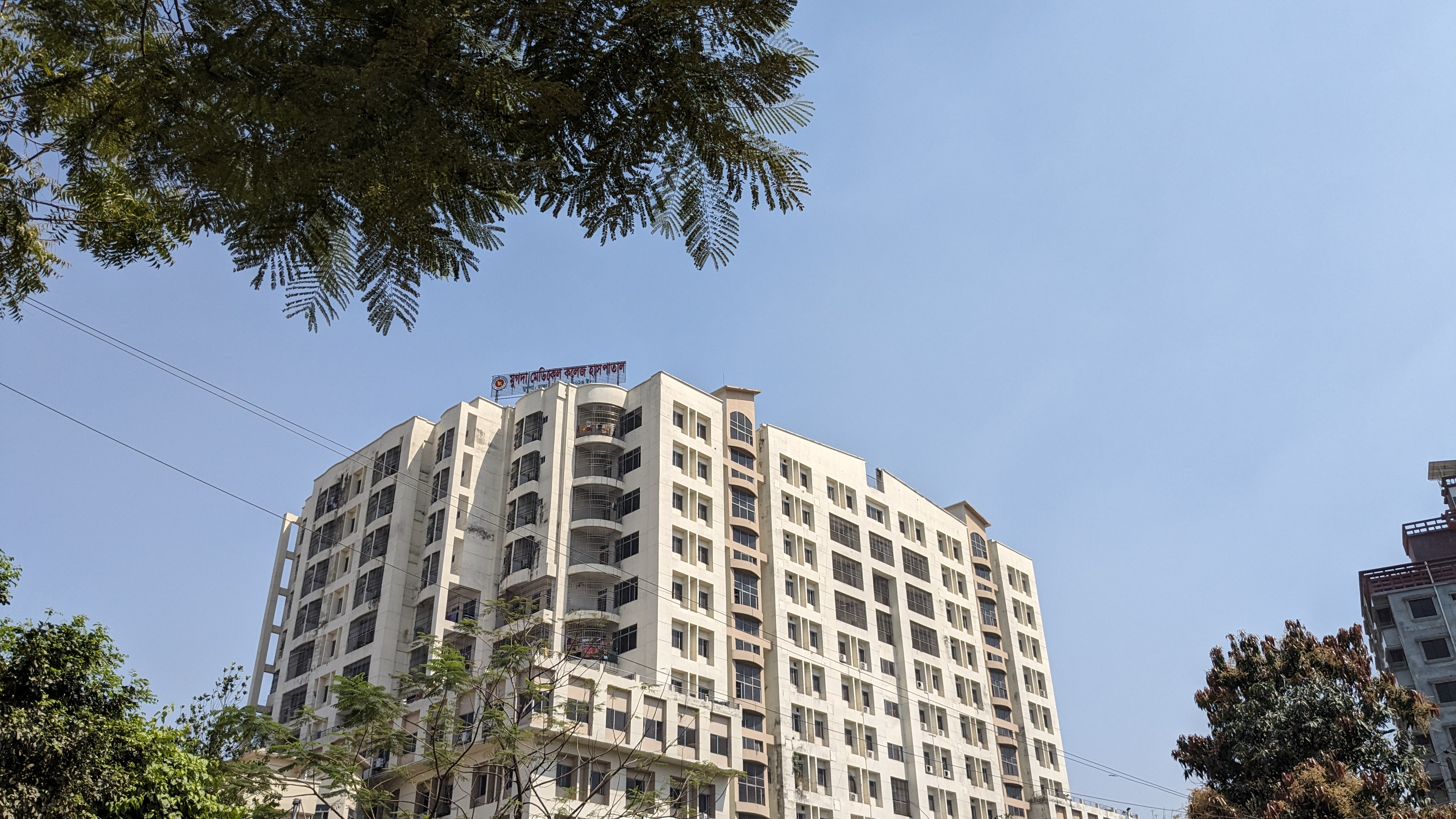
Mugda Medical College & Hospital building

== See also ==
- List of medical colleges in Bangladesh
- National Institute of Advanced Nursing Education and Research
