= Mohammad Samir Hossain =

Bangladeshi psychologist (born 1976)

- মোহাম্মদ সামির হোসেন
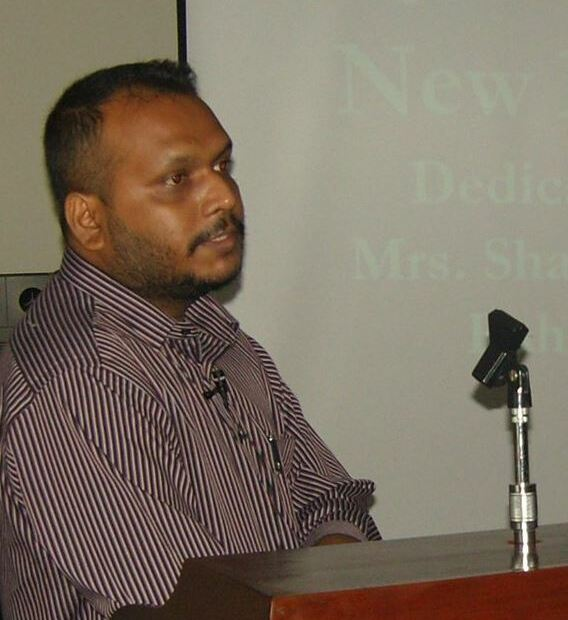
- Born: 28 November 1976 (age 49)
- Education: Dhaka College; Sir Salimullah Medical College; Auckland University of Technology
- Spouse: Tahmina Rahman Chowdhury
- Website: www.masterdeathanddying.com

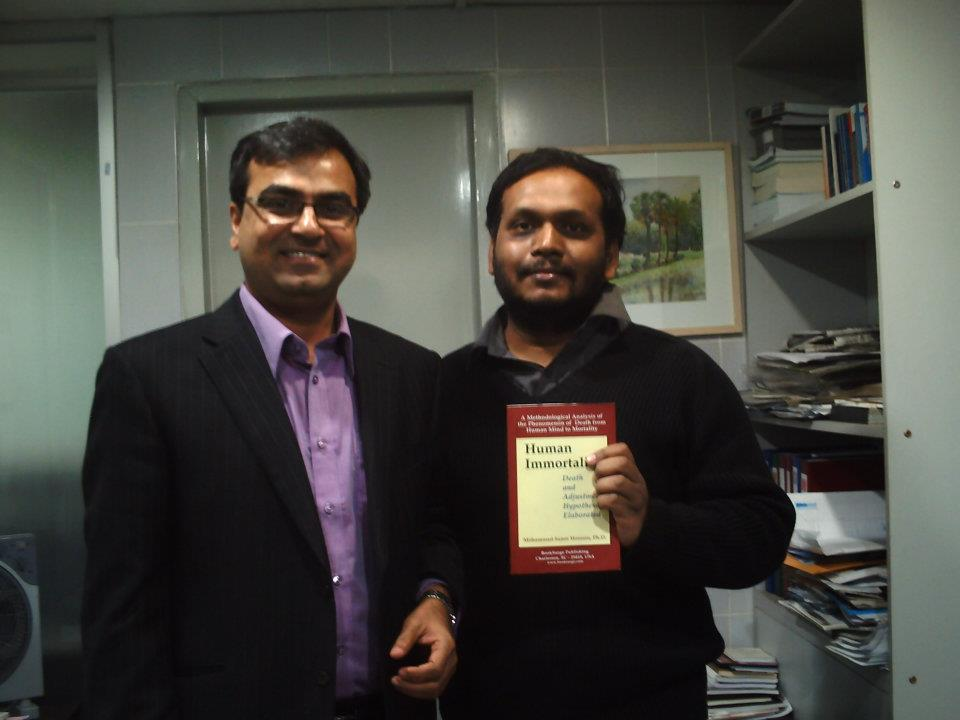
Hossain on Death education campaigning with Za E Mamun(left), News Head, ATN Bangla

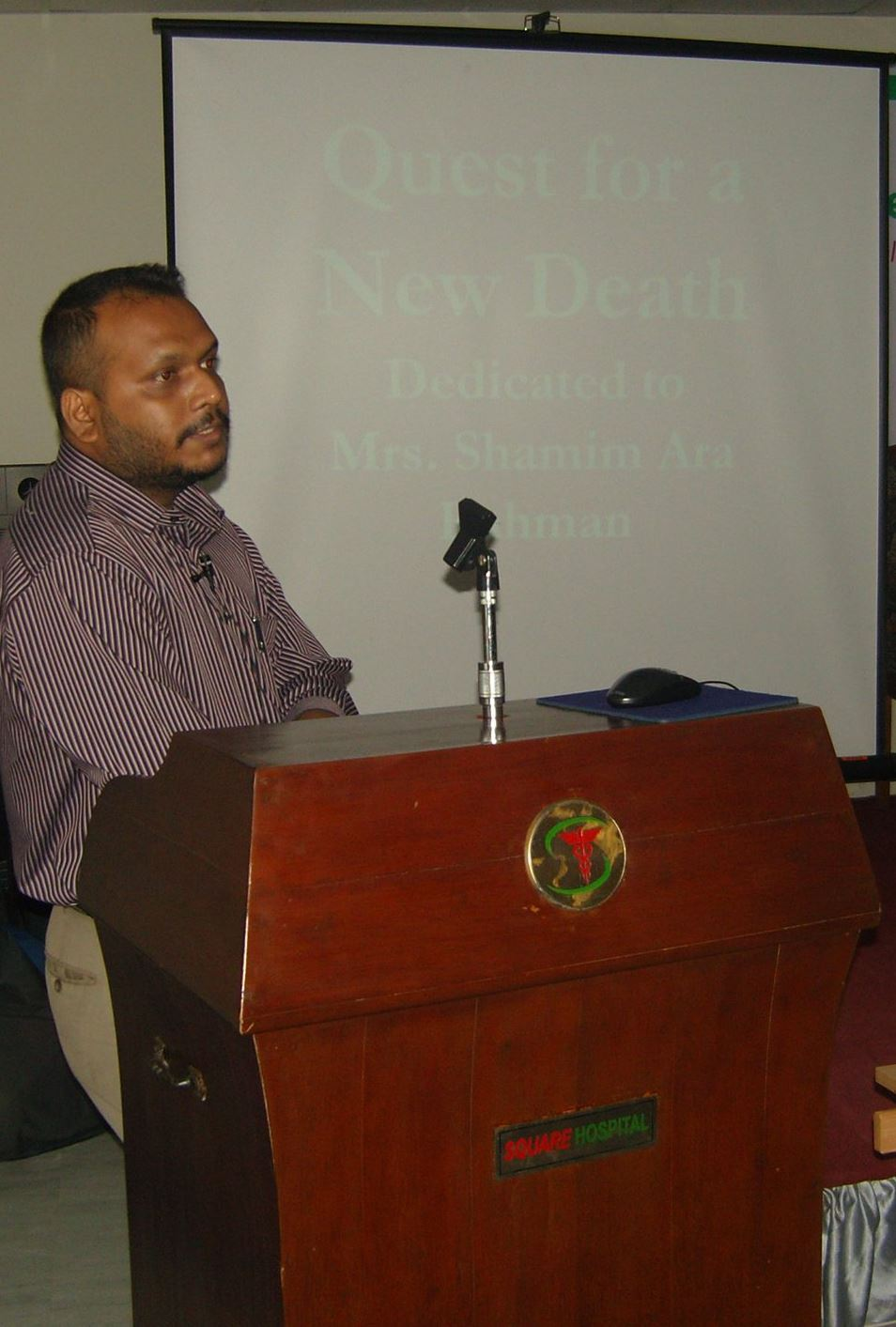
Hossain Lecturing on his theory for the Consultants of Square Hospital in Dhaka

Mohammad Samir Hossain (born 28 November 1976) is a Bangladeshi theorist living in New Zealand who is one of the few Muslim scientists in the field of death anxiety research. He is the pioneering physician to introduce scientific thanatology and spiritual psychiatry in Bangladesh. He is also an author of multiple theory books on death adjustment.

== Education and career ==
Hossain passed SSC and HSC exam from Ideal School and College and Dhaka College respectively. He completed his medical graduation from Sir Salimullah Medical College in Dhaka. After that, he studied Basic modern psychology, Abnormal psychology, Psychiatry, Psychotherapy and Philosophy (Death) for which he participated in different external educational activities offered from different institutions including some prestigious ones like Johns Hopkins University School of Medicine, Harvard Medical School, and Yale University. After his education in Psychotherapy, he was engaged in death anxiety researches. Hossain also studied Public Health in Auckland University of Technology in 2016 and 2017.

Hossain is a physician. He taught psychiatry at the Medical College for Women and Hospital at Uttara in Dhaka. He is an honorary external faculty of the Palliative Care Service at Bangabandhu Sheikh Mujib Medical University where he teaches death related psychiatry.

Hossain's educations in different modes of distance learning, after his medical graduation, created some sort of traumatic turmoil during his early career inside his own country. However, as per Hossain's autobiography, his researches and their conclusions helped him in healing that wound that ultimately gave birth to further development in his works.

== Theory ==
Of all the works of Hossain, Death and adjustment hypotheses is the most noteworthy one in the field of death anxiety research. Apart from his books written on it, in UK, the Royal College of Psychiatrists at London published the theory as the article Facing the finality: Death and Adjustment Hypotheses. Later, once again it reached the international community of scientists through the Taylor & Francis publication Journal of Loss and Trauma as the article Introducing Death and Adjustment Hypotheses. With the declaration of the hypotheses, two things were postulated. The first part of the hypotheses theorises that death should not be considered the end of existence. The next segment states the belief that the immortal pattern of human existence can only be adopted in a morally rich life with the attitude towards morality and materialism balanced mutually.

== Books ==
Two most practised theory books in English language authored by Hossain are Quest for a New Death and Human Immortality

== Personal life ==
Hossain's personal life is contributory to his scientific activities in such a way that the Journal of Loss and Trauma published his partial autobiography Abstinence: A Memoir in 2011 and Further Life Experiences Informing the Death and Adjustment Hypotheses in 2017 to reflect how psychological traumas taught and helped him learning to cope. In those articles, Hossain, mentioned of his elder son Mohammad Seeyam Samir's death as the strongest motivation for his researches on death anxiety. He also mentioned of his anticipatory fear about his parents – Md Manjur Hossain and Rezia Begum's death in unknown future as another motivational factor from his early childhood; both of them eventually died before 2015. It ultimately compelled him to learn and theorise how to adjust to the phenomenon of death of the loved ones. Hossain is married to Tahmina Rahman Chowdhury. They have another son, Mohammad Raiyan Samir. He lives in New Zealand since 2016 with his son and wife.

== See also ==
- death anxiety
- Death and adjustment hypotheses
