= Mugda =

Thana in Dhaka South City Corporation, Bangladesh

- Thana
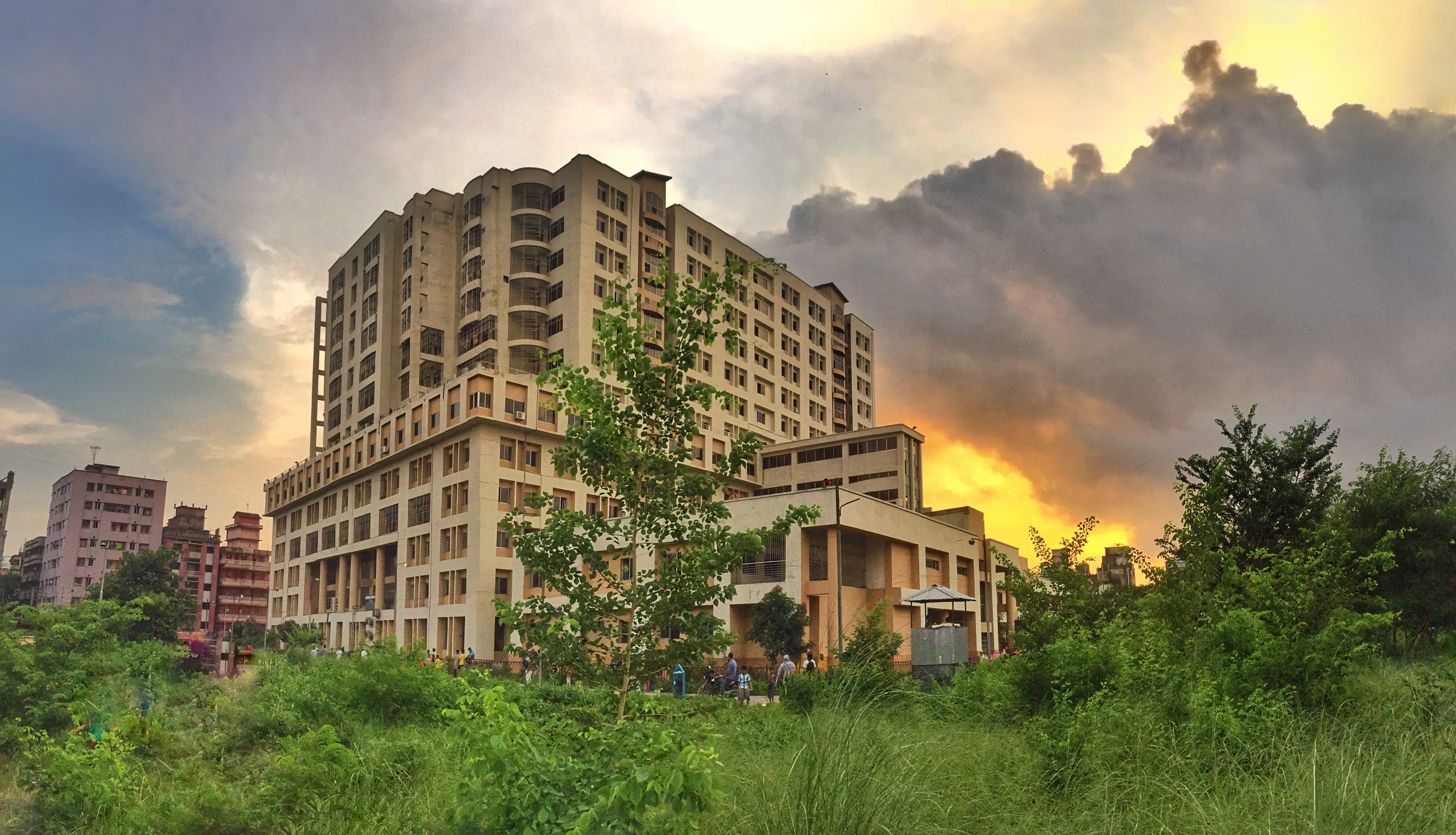
- Mugda Medical College
- Interactive map of Mugda
- Country: Bangladesh
- Division: Dhaka Division
- District: Dhaka District
- Elevation: 23 m (75 ft)

Population (2022)
  - Total: 208,974
- Time zone: UTC+6 (BST)

Mugda (Bengali: মুগদা, romanized: Mugdā) or Mugdapara (মুগদাপাড়া, Mugdāpāṛā) is a thana (city district) in Dhaka South City Corporation, Bangladesh. The thana is encompassed by wards 5, 6, and 7, and is home to Kamalapur Stadium, and is situated close to Kamalapur railway station and Motijheel.

== Educational Insitustions ==
- Ideal School and College (Mugda Branch)

== Background and demographics ==
Mugda Thana was established in 2012 after splitting from Sabujbagh Thana. Previously, the northern area was known as Thakurpara, named after the Hindu Thakurs who settled there, mainly public employees. These residents were known for digging several large ponds in the area.

== Demographics ==
Religions in Mugda Thana (2022)
| Religion | Percent |
| Islam | 95.16% |
| Hinduism | 4.76% |
| Other or not stated | 0.08% |

According to the 2022 Bangladeshi census, Mugda Thana had 55,755 households and a population of 208,974. 7.88% of

the population were under 5 years of age. Mugda had a literacy rate (age 7 and over) of 81.98%: 83.24% for males and 80.52% for females, and a sex ratio of 114.96 males for every 100 females.

== Geography ==
Mugda Thana covers approx. 9 square kilometres (3.5 sq mi). The areas falling under its jurisdiction comprise Bishwaroad, Kamalapur, Maniknagar, Mugdapara, Madinabagh, Mugda Jhilpara, South Mugdapara, Bank Colony, Chedpara, Anandhadhara, Bengal Garments Lane, Residential Area, Wapda Lane, No. 7 Lane, Mugda Stadium, Maniknagar, East Maniknagar Wasa Road, 19 Katha Area, Khalpara, Jhilpara, and East Maniknagar Jhilpara, Manda (including Dhaka South City Corporation ward no 71,72), Green Model Town.

Mugda is located east of Atish Deepankar Road, bordered by Bashabo to the north, Maniknagar to the south and east, and Gopibag and Kamalapur to the west.

== See also ==
- Mugda Medical College & Hospital, public medical college
- Kamalapur Stadium, football stadium
- Thanas of Bangladesh
