= M. A. Hadi =

Bangladeshi Surgeon and Vice-chancellor (1941-2007)

Md. Abdul Hadi
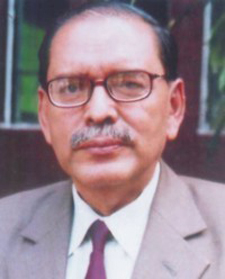

4th Vice Chancellor of Bangabandhu Sheikh Mujib Medical University
- In office 24 November 2001 – 21 December 2006
- Preceded by: Mahmud Hasan
- Succeeded by: Md. Tahir

Personal details
- Born: 31 December 1941
- Died: 16 October 2007 (aged 66)
- Education: Dhaka Medical College
- Occupation: Surgeon, academic

Mohammad Abdul Hadi (31 December 1941 – 16 October 2007) was a Bangladeshi academic who served as the 4th Vice Chancellor of Bangabandhu Sheikh Mujib Medical University.

== Early life and education ==
Hadi was born on 31 December 1941. He passed MBBS from Dhaka Medical College in 1964. He gained FCPS from Bangladesh College of Physicians and Surgeons in Surgery in 1973.

== Career ==
Hadi served as the director general of Directorate General of Health Services, and the President of Bangladesh Medical Association, Bangladesh College of Physicians and Surgeons (BCPS), Bangladesh Medical Research Council (BMRC) and Doctors' Association of Bangladesh. He was also the Principal of Dhaka Medical College and Dean of Faculty of Medicine, University of Dhaka.

== Award and honors ==
He was also awarded FICS (Urology) from the International College of Surgeons in 1993, FRCP from the Royal College of Physicians, Edinburgh in 1995, FCPS from the College of Physicians and Surgeons, Pakistan, 1999, FRCP&S from the Royal College of Physicians and Surgeons, Glasgow in 2005.
