= Atgharia Upazila =

Atgharia আটঘরিয়া
- Upazila
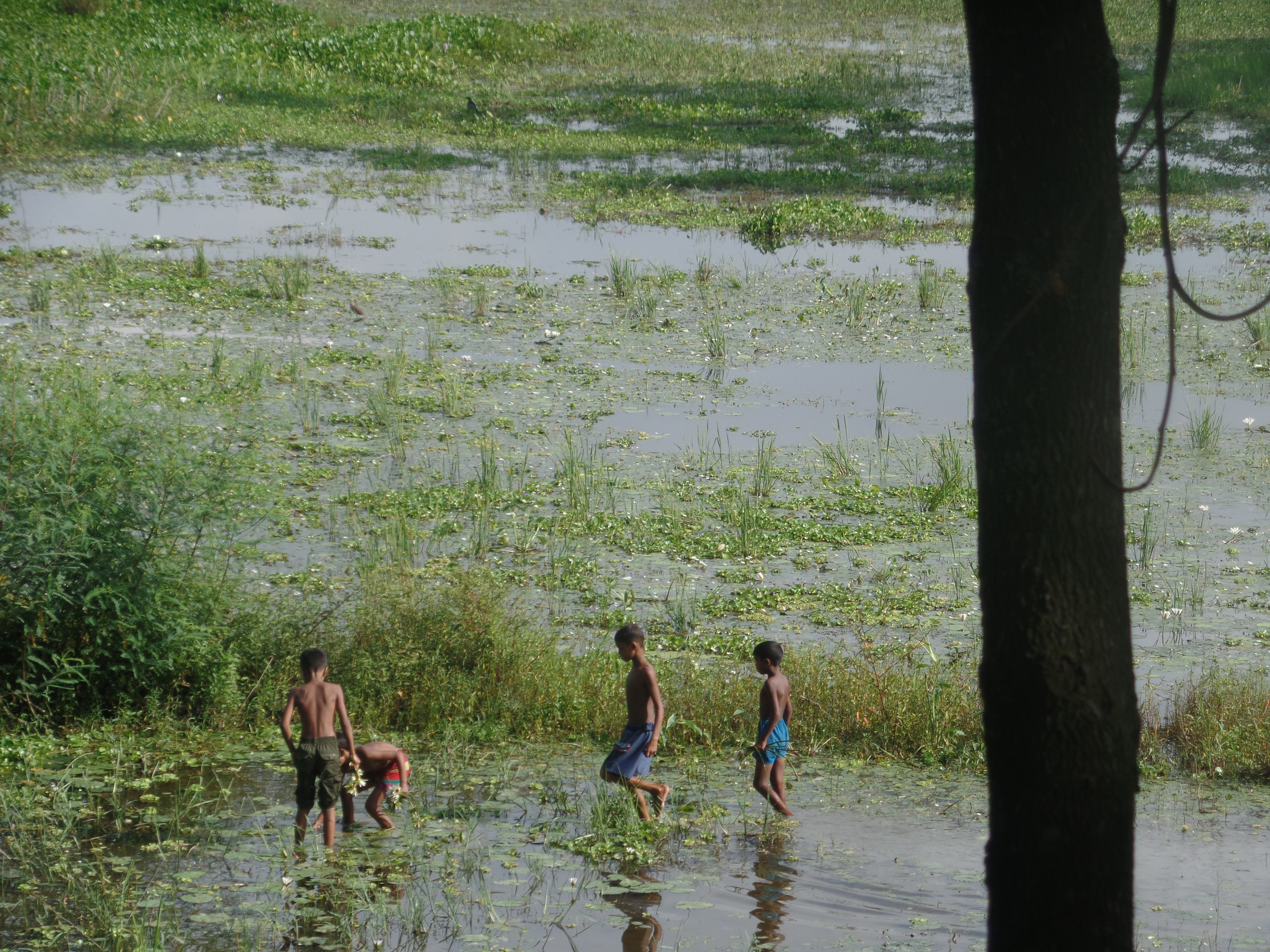
- A shallow wetland in Atgharia Upazila

- Coordinates: 24°8′N 89°15′E
- Country: Bangladesh
- Division: Rajshahi
- District: Pabna

Area
  - Total: 186.15 km^{2} (71.87 sq mi)

Population (2022)
  - Total: 178,582
  - Density: 959.34/km^{2} (2,484.7/sq mi)
- Time zone: UTC+6 (BST)
- Postal code: 6610
- Website: Official Map of Atgharia

Atgharia Upazila mauza geocode map

Atgharia (Bengali: আটঘরিয়া or আটঘোরিয়া) is an upazila of Pabna District in Rajshahi Division, Bangladesh.

== History ==
A fierce battle was fought in 1971 between the Pak army and the freedom fighters at the Kalamnagor Ghat on river Chandrabati of Majpara Union. Md Anwar Hossain led the battle on the Mukti Bahini side. Sixteen local villagers joined this battle. In this battle 12 freedom fighters and 10 villagers were killed. The Pakistan army lost their commander, Captain Tahir. A foundation has been built to pay respect to all these great heroes including 10 village fighters. The Kalamnagor Muktijoddha Ghat is now a historical place. Daily, 50 to 100 people come to visit the place.

== Geography ==
Atgharia Upazila with an area of 186.15 km^{2} is bounded by Baraigram, Chatmohar and Faridpur upazilas on the north, Pabna Sadar upazila on the south, Santhia upazila on the east and Ishwardi upazilas on the west. Main rivers are Chiknai, Ratnai and Chandrabati; Purulia and Sutir Beels are notable. Atgharia is located at 24.1333°N 89.2500°E. It has 38,435 households and total area 186.15 km^{2}.

== Demographics ==
Religions in Atgharia Upazila (2022)
Religion	Percent
Islam	98.27%
Hinduism	1.65%
Other or not stated	0.08%

According to the 2022 Bangladeshi census, Atgharia Upazila had 46,328 households and a population of 178,582. 9.07% of the population were under 5 years of age. Atgharia had a literacy rate (age 7 and over) of 68.79%: 68.82% for males and 68.76% for females, and a sex ratio of 98.01 males for every 100 females. 22,085 (12.37%) lived in urban areas.

According to the 2011 Census of Bangladesh, Atgharia Upazila had 38,435 households and a population of 157,254. 35,349 (22.48%) were under 10 years of age. Atgharia had a literacy rate (age 7 and over) of 43.67%, compared to the national average of 51.8%, and a sex ratio of 1010 females per 1000 males. 13,686 (8.70%) lived in urban areas.

As of the 1991 Bangladesh census, Atgharia has a population of 124454. Males constitute 51.41% of the population, and females 48.59%. This Upazila's eighteen up population is 59721. Atgharia has an average literacy rate of 21.7% (7+ years), and the national average of 32.4% literate.

Atgharia (Town) located at Debattar, consists of four mouzas. The area of the town is 5.93 km^{2}. The town has a population of 5164; male 50.37%, female 49.63%. The density of population is 871 per km^{2}.

== Administration ==
Administration Atgharia thana was turned into an upazila in 1983.

Atgharia Upazila is divided into Atgharia Municipality and five union parishads: Chandba, Debottar, Ekdanta, Lakshmipur, and Majhpara. The union parishads are subdivided into 111 mauzas and 122 villages.

Atgharia Municipality is subdivided into 9 wards and 18 mahallas.

- Chairman:Tanvirul Islam
- Vice Chairman: Abdus Sattar Mohammad Sohel
- Woman Vice Chairman: Meherun Nessa
- Upazila Nirbahi Officer (UNO): Syed Robiul Islam

== Education ==
Average literacy rate 21.07%; male 26.4% and female 16.8%. Educational institution: College 5, secondary school 15, madrasa 18, government primary school 44, non-government primary school 29. Noted educational institutions: Ramchandrapur High School, Atgharia Pilot Model High School, Debattar Pilot Girls' High School, Sahid Abdul Khaleque High School, B.L.K High school, Khidirpur high school, Parkhidirpur high school, Ekdanta High School, Lakshmipur High School, Debattar Model Government Primary School (1880), Shibpur Madrassa.

== Notable persons ==
- Lutfor Rahman, cardiac surgeon, spent most of his childhood in Atgharia village.

== See also ==
- Upazilas of Bangladesh
- Districts of Bangladesh
- Divisions of Bangladesh
