= Arup Ratan Choudhury =

Bangladeshi dental specialist and media personality

- অরুপ রতন চৌধুরী
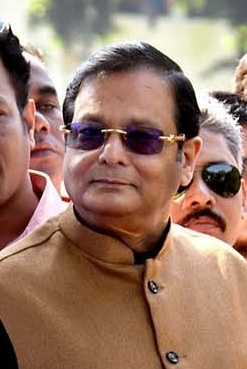
- Ratan in 2022
- Born: 23 January 1952 (age 74); Sylhet, East Bengal, Pakistan
- Education: Dhaka Medical College; London University; State University of New York
- Occupation: Dental surgeon
- Years active: 1975–present
- Relatives: Subhagata Choudhury (brother)

Arup Ratan Choudhury (born 23 January 1952) is a Bangladeshi dental specialist and media personality. He is currently the head and senior consultant at the Department of Dentistry, Bangladesh Institute of Research and Rehabilitation for Diabetes, Endocrine and Metabolic Disorders (BIRDEM).

== Early life ==
Choudhury was born on 23 January 1952, in Sylhet. He passed S.S.C. exam from Sylhet Government Pilot High School in 1968 and H.S.C. exam from Jagannath College in 1970. He completed his Bachelor of Dental Surgery in 1975 from Dhaka Dental College and Hospital under University of Dhaka. He received Doctor of Philosophy (PhD) from University of Dhaka in 2000. He received fellowship in Dental Public Health under World Health Organization Fellowship Program 1983–1984, London University, UK and postdoctoral research fellow, 1992–1993 at Department of Oral Biology & Pathology, School of Dental Medicine, State University of New York (SUNY) at Stony Brook, New York City. He became the Fellow of International College of Continuous Dental Education (FICCDE) in 2003 and Fellow of International congress on Oral Cancer (FICOOC) in 2005.He received Fellowship in Dental Surgery from Royal College of Surgeons of England (FDSRCS) in 2013.

== Career ==
- 1986– 2001: Consultant, Department of Dentistry, Bangladesh Institute of Research & Rehabilitation in Diabetes, Endocrine & Metabolic Disorders (BIRDEM) Dhaka, Diabetic Association of Bangladesh November 15, 1988, to September 30, 1992, and October 20, 1993, to February 28, 2001.
- 2001–present: Professor, head & senior consultant, BIRDEM Hospital and Ibrahim Medical College and National Medical College.
- 1987–present: Founder president, Association For the Prevention of Drug Abuse (MANAS) Government approved & supported N.G.O. Recipient of WHO Medal and Certificate.
- 1987– Visiting scholar-International Visitors Program (IVP) on Drug Abuse sponsored by United States Information Agency (USIS), USA.
- 2008–present: Member, National Board of Drug Control, Ministry of Home Affairs, Government of the People's Republic of Bangladesh.
- 1984–1987: Assistant professor, Department of Dentistry, Institute of Post Graduate Medicine & Research (IPGM&R), Dhaka Bangladesh.
- 1976–present: Programmer and presenter on Health Education Programs National in mass media (newspaper, radio, television). Speaker in public seminars and short film maker (main focus on substance use, anti-smoking) or TV serial.

=== Film Director ===
- Swargo Theke Norok (2015)

== Awards ==
- "Tobacco or Health" from World Health Organization (WHO) (1998)
- Atish Dipankar Gold Medal by Atish Dipankar Golshana Parishad (2000)
- Ekushey Padak (2015)
