= Dhaka Medical College Bones Bank =

Bone bank at Dhaka Medical College in Bangladesh

DMC Bones Bank
- ডিএমসি বোনস ব্যাংক
- Formation: 2025
- Type: Medical bone bank
- Headquarters: Dhaka Medical College Hospital, Dhaka, Bangladesh
- Website: dmcbonesbank.org

The DMC Bones Bank (DBB) is a non-political voluntary organization initiated by students of Dhaka Medical College to provide an organized system governing the use of human bones in medical education by lending skeletal materials to first-year medical students for free.

This project was launched to reduce—and ultimately eliminate—the informal trade of human skeletal remains, a practice that has historically involved not only commercial transactions among students but also, in many cases, the robbery of burial sites, which are regarded as sacred in nearly all religions and cultures.

== History ==
The idea of DMC Bones Bank was first proposed by some students of the K-78 batch of DMC. The motivation behind this idea was the wish to put an end to the unethical practice of the human bones trade, which is prohibited in Islam. This concept was shared much later in the 'DMCan' Facebook group, where it was highly appreciated by the students and alumni.

Initially, political and institutional barriers prevented this idea from moving forward, but following political changes in Bangladesh in August 2024, the concept gained momentum. Alumni and senior batches began donating bone sets, especially the K-80 batch, which had recently completed the first professional examination. Sets missing certain bones were filled with artificial bones. Donated funds were used to purchase storage trunks for safe and well-arranged preservation. The Bones Bank was formally inaugurated on 13 August 2025 in the presence of DMC Principal Professor Dr. Md. Kamrul Alam, Vice-Principal Professor Dr. Faruk Ahammad, and other faculty members. At the launch, 41 bone sets were distributed among 124 students of the K-82 batch.

The project also introduced a digital management system. A well-organized website, developed by MD Shifat Bin Siddique of the K-79 batch, maintains records of each bone set, along with details of every applicant and donor.

== Organization Structure ==
The DMC Bones Bank is operated by volunteer students from the current batches of Dhaka Medical College, under the supervision of the Permanent Governing Council (PGC). The PGC is a responsible authority formed by the initiators and custodians of the organisation. Its members are committed to abstain from any involvement in political parties, organisations, or partisan activities throughout their lives. The respected Islamic scholar and Khatib of the mosque of Shaheed Dr. Fazle Rabbi Hall of DMC serves as the advisor to the PGC.

== Function ==
Initially, bones are collected from donors including alumni, current students, also a few students from other medical colleges and the details of each bone set are updated in the website inventory. The information of donors is also carefully recorded. Bone sets are issued to applicants forming groups of 2-3 individuals and a unique set ID is assigned to each group. Both the applicants’ and bone sets’ information are then systematically organized. Each bone set is securely packed in a trunk, labeled with its respective set ID and fitted with a lock for safety.

At the start of their classes, medico freshers receive their assigned bone sets. After their first professional examination, the sets are retrieved, and the same process is repeated for the next batch of students. Any loss or damage to bone sets will incur a fine as determined by the Permanent Governing Council of DMC Bones Bank.

== See also ==
- Dhaka Medical College
