= Lutfor Rahman (disambiguation) =

Lutfor Rahman (born 1962) is a Bangladeshi cardiac surgeon.

Lutfor Rahman may also refer to:

- Lutfor Rahman (Bangladeshi politician) (died 2008)
- Md Lutfor Rahman (born 1970), Bangladeshi diplomat

== See also ==
- Lutfur Rahman (disambiguation)
