= Sayed Haider =

Bangladeshi physician and language movement veteran (1925–2020)

- Born: December 1925; Pabna, Bangladesh
- Died: 15 July 2020 (aged 94)
- Education: Dhaka Medical College
- Known for: Bengali language movement veteran Designer of first Shaheed Minar, Dhaka
- Awards: Ekushey Padak

Sayed Haider (December 1925 – 15 July 2020) was a Bangladeshi physician and Language Movement activist. He along with Badrul Alam designed the first Shaheed Minar. It was then demolished by the Pakistani Army on 26 February 1952. For his contribution to the Language Movement he was awarded Ekushey Padak in 2016.

== Early life ==
Haider was born in 1925 at Pabna in the then British India.

== Education ==
He passed MBBS from Dhaka Medical College in 1952. He received postgraduate diploma on public health from Punjab University.

== Bengali Language movement ==
After the unrest and killing of students on 21 February 1952, students of Dhaka Medical College decided to build a monument 'Shaheed Minar' (Monument for Martyrs) in honor of the killed activists. Haider along with Badrul Alam planned and designed the Shaheed Minar.

== Books ==
Haider wrote books on public health and medicine. Rog Niramoy Sustho Jibon was published in 1969. Loksomaj Chikitshabiggyan was published from Bangla Academy.

== Award and honors ==
Haider was awarded Ekushey Padak in 2016 for his contribution in language movement.

== Death ==
He died on 15 July 2020 in Dhaka from reportedly late complications of the coronavirus infection.
