= Shamsul Alam Khan Milon =

Bangladeshi physician and political activist

- শামসুল আলম খান মিলন
- Born: August 21, 1957
- Died: November 27, 1990 (aged 33)
- Cause of death: Assassinated
- Resting place: Dhaka Medical College premises
- Education: Dhaka Medical College
- Occupations: Physician, academic

Shamsul Alam Khan Milon (Bengali: শামসুল আলম খান মিলন), commonly known as Shaheed Dr. Milon, was a Bangladeshi physician and political activist. He was killed on November 27, 1990, allegedly by cadres supportive of the then military ruler Hussain Muhammad Ershad.

== Early life and education ==
Milon was born on August 21, 1957, at Dhaka. He passed SSC in 1973 and HSC in 1975 from Notre Dame College, Dhaka. Then he was enrolled in Dhaka Medical College to study Medicine. He passed MBBS in 1983. He completed M.Phil in Biochemistry in 1988.

== Career ==
Milon joined at Department of Physiology & Biochemistry in Dhaka Medical College as lecturer. He had been serving at that post till his death. He was the then Joint secretary of Bangladesh Medical Association.

== Death ==
At the height of 1990 Mass Uprising in Bangladesh, Milon was killed by gunmen of the then military dictator Hussain Muhammad Ershad near Teacher-Student Centre (TSC), University of Dhaka on November 27, 1990.

On that day, Milon, accompanied by Mostofa Jalal Mohiuddin were heading for the then IPGMR to attend a meeting arranged by Bangladesh Medical Association by a rickshaw. Milon was shot while crossing TSC of University of Dhaka. He was rushed to Dhaka Medical College Hospital but doctors declared him dead.

== Impact of death ==
The death of Milon ignited a wide spread uprising amid the anti-autocracy movement. It prompted the dethroning of military ruler Hussain Muhammad Ershad on December 6, 1990, only a few days after Milon's assassination.

== Shaheed Dr. Milon day ==
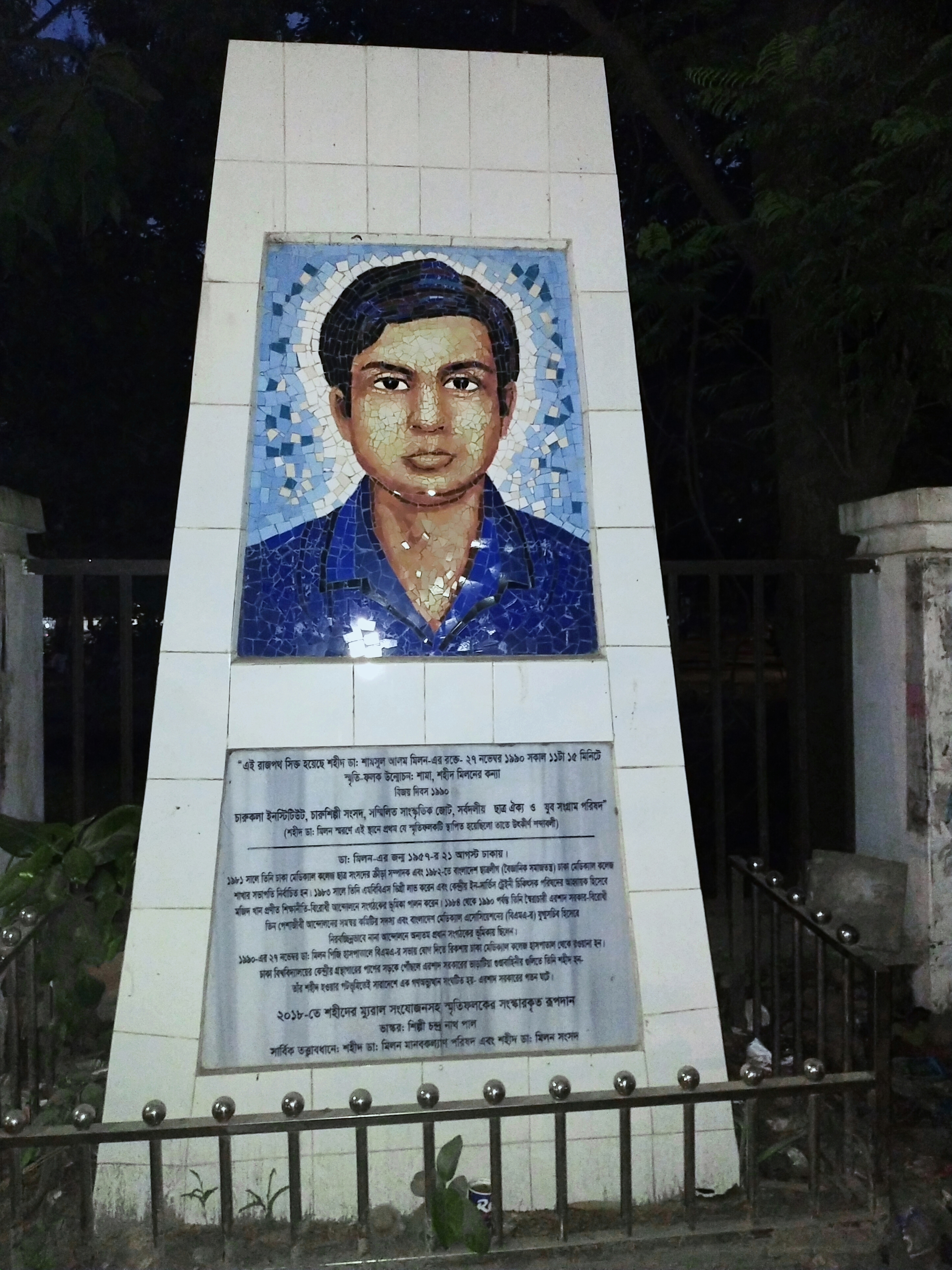
Mural and Memorial of Shaheed Dr. Shamsul Alam Khan Milon at road side of Dhaka University central library

The day of his death is observed each year as Shaheed Dr. Milon Day by all political parties in Bangladesh since 1991.
