= William Virgin =

William Virgin may refer to:

- William John Virgin, Indian Medical Service officer and principal of Dhaka Medical College
- William Wirt Virgin, American politician and jurist from Maine
