= Khan Abul Kalam Azad =

Bangladeshi physician & academic (born 1960)

- খান আবুল কালাম আজাদ

40th Principal of Dhaka Medical College
- In office 13 June 2017 – 31 December 2020
- Preceded by: Shafiqul Alam Chowdhury (acting)
- Succeeded by: Titu Miah

Personal details
- Born: 1960 (age 65–66) Dhaka, East Pakistan
- Education: Dhaka College; Dhaka Medical College
- Occupation: Academic, physician

Khan Abul Kalam Azad is a Bangladeshi physician and academic. He is an internist. He is the 40th principal of Dhaka Medical College and past president of the Bangladesh Society of Medicine.

== Early life ==
Azad was born in Dhaka in 1960. He is the fourth son of Abul Hossain Khan and Selina Hossain Khan.

Azad passed Secondary school certificate from West End High School, Dhaka. He passed HSC from Dhaka College in 1976. Then he got admitted in Dhaka Medical College. He is a student of batch K-35 of the institution. He passed MBBS in 1983. Azad obtained fellowship in internal medicine in 1991 from Bangladesh College of Physicians and Surgeons. He achieved M.D. in internal medicine from University of Dhaka in 1999.

== Career ==
In 2017, Azad was appointed as 40th principal of Dhaka Medical College.

He also served as dean of the Faculty of Medicine, University of Dhaka until 2019. He was the dean of the Faculty of Postgraduate Medical Sciences & Research, University of Dhaka. He was also the principal of Popular Medical College.

== Personal life ==
Azad is married to Jesmine Hossain Khan. They have two sons.

== International affiliation ==
He is a fellow of American College of Physicians. He was awarded with the mastership by the same college for FY 2020–21.

== Professional and organizational affiliations ==
- Councilor, Bangladesh College of Physicians and Surgeons
- Member of Executive Committee, BCPS
- Member of executive committee, Bangladesh Medical Research Council
- Member, National Research Ethics Committee
- Councilor and member of the executive committee, Bangladesh Medical & Dental Council
- Chief administrator (Administration & finance), Bangladesh State Medical Faculty
- Past President, Bangladesh Society of Medicine
- Member of executive committee and former vice president, Bangladesh Rheumatology Society

== Publications ==
=== Research works ===
Azad published hundreds of research articles and reviews in national and international journals of Medicine.

=== Books ===
- Khan Abul Kalam Azad; Ahmedul Kabir; Mohammad Robed Amin (2020). 101 interesting cases in clinical medicine. Jaypee Brothers. ISBN 9789389129632.

=== Editorial activities ===
- Executive editor, Journal of Dhaka Medical College
- Executive editor, Journal of Bangladesh College of Physicians and Surgeons
- Executive editor, Journal of Bangladesh Medical Association
- Member of Advisory board, Journal of Society of Medicine.
- Member, Clinical Management of COVID-19, Bangladesh
