= Meerjady Sabrina Flora =

Bangladeshi epidemiologist

- মীরজাদী সেব্রিনা ফ্লোরা
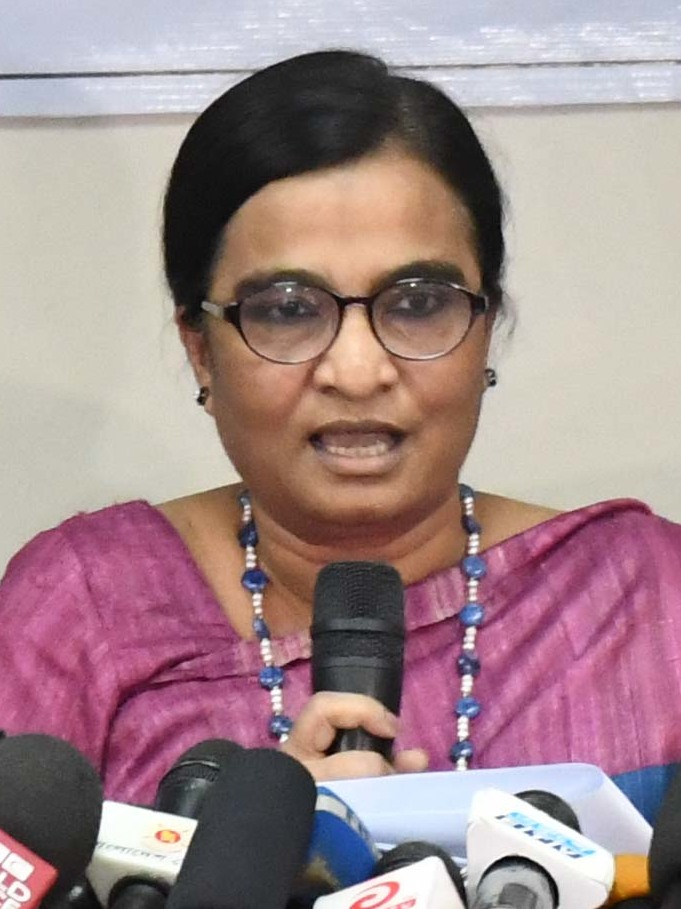

Additional DG(P&D) of Directorate General of Health Services
- Incumbent
- Assumed office 2020
- Preceded by: Sanya Tahmina Jhora

Director of the Institute of Epidemiology, Disease Control and Research
- In office 2016–2020
- Preceded by: Mahmudur Rahman
- Succeeded by: Tahmina Shirin

Personal details
- Education: Dhaka Medical College; University of Cambridge

Meerjady Sabrina Flora is a Bangladeshi physician, professor of epidemiology and public health specialist. She is the additional director general of Directorate General of Health Services (planning and development). Previously, she headed the Institute of Epidemiology, Disease Control and Research (IEDCR), the apex center for conducting disease surveillance, outbreak investigation, disease control, epidemic prevention and research in Bangladesh.

She is a fellow of the Foundation for Advancement of International Medical Education and Research. She is also the vice president of the International Association of National Public Health Institutes.

== Biography ==
Flora enrolled in Dhaka Medical College in 1983. After obtaining her Bachelor of Medicine and Bachelor of Surgery degree, she worked in several multinational institutions. She received her master's degree in epidemiology from the National Institute of Preventive and Social Medicine (NIPSOM) and she received her PhD degree from the University of Cambridge.

Later, she worked at the Bangladesh Medical Research Council for three years as the assistant director. She joined NIPSOM afterwards as an assistant professor in the Department of Epidemiology and was promoted to full professor gradually. She was appointed as the director of the IEDCR in 2016 and add'l director general of DGHS in 2020.

She was admitted to a Singapore hospital for medical treatment after falling ill and she recovered subsequently.

== Activities ==
As the director of IEDCR she has implemented lots of surveillance activities, research, oversaw emergencies while ensuring screening measures for ZIKA, MERS-CoV etc. at Dhaka Airport. Her team also dealt with the Chikungunya outbreak in 2017 and is currently overseeing the death review committee for the recent dengue outbreak. During the COVID-19 pandemic, Meerjady was the focal person of the COVID-19 situation in Bangladesh as the head of IEDCR until her promotion.
