= Statistics of the COVID-19 pandemic in Bangladesh =

Statistics relating to COVID-19 in Bangladesh

This article presents official statistics gathered during the COVID-19 pandemic in Bangladesh.

The numbers are sourced from the official daily press releases, originally released by the Institute of Epidemiology, Disease Control and Research (IEDCR) and later from the Directorate General of Health Services (DGHS).

== Charts ==
=== Daily tests, cases, and deaths ===
View source data.

=== Daily recoveries ===
View source data.

Note: On 15 June, the total number of people who were recorded to have recovered from the coronavirus disease rose by over 15,000. The Directorate General of Health Services (DGHS) started to announce how many people recovered at hospital and home on this date.

=== Case fatality rate ===
The trend of case fatality rate for COVID-19 from 8 March, the day first case in the country was recorded.

Case fatality rate

=== Total cases, deaths and recoveries ===
View source data.

== Tables ==
=== Table: Daily updates ===
Cases in Bangladesh as reported by Institute of Epidemiology, Disease Control and Research (IEDCR) and Directorate General of Health Services (DGHS)
					In the last 24 hours				Notes	Days since first confirmed cases
Date	Total tested	Total cases	Total deaths	Total recovered	Newly tested	New cases	New deaths	Newly recovered	Notes	Days since first confirmed cases
2020-03-08	111	3	0	0			0			0
2020-03-11	142	3	0	2			0			3
2020-03-12	163	3	0	2			0			4
2020-03-13	187	3	0	2			0			5
2020-03-14	211	5	0	3			0			6
2020-03-15	231	5	0	3			0			7
2020-03-16	241	8	0	3			0	0		8
2020-03-17	277	10	0	3			0	0		9
2020-03-18	351	14	1	3	10	4	1	1	Three males were returnees from Italy and Kuwait while the female was a family member of a foreign returnee	10
2020-03-19	397	17	1	3	46	3	0	0	Two male cases are returnees from Italy and the female is a family member	11
2020-03-20	433	20	1	3	36	3	0	0		12
2020-03-21	433* (Check Note)	24	2	3	36* (Check note)	4	1	2	First death from community transmission *Government press releases from both 2020-3-20 and 2020-3-21 state that 'total number of individuals tested for COVID-19 till date' is 433 and 'number tested in last 24 hours' is 36. These are likely errors.	13
2020-03-22	564	27	2	5	27	3	0	0	New cases include a doctor who treated the patient who died on 20 March.	14
2020-03-23	620	33	3	5	56	6	1	0	New cases characteristics: 3 males, 3 females; 23 healthcare workers, and two returnees from India and Bahrain. New death caused by community transmission.	15
2020-03-24	712	39	4	5	92	6	1	0	New positives include returnee from Saudi Arabia and 4 locals with epidemiological link. The death of the female was related to community transmission	16
2020-03-25	794	39	5	5	82	0	1	6		17
2020-03-26	920	44	5	11	126	5	0	0		18
2020-03-27	1026	48	5	11	106	4	0	0		19
2020-03-28	1076	48	5	15	47	0	0	4		20
2020-03-29	1,185	48	5	15	109	0	0	4		21
2020-03-30	1,338	49	5	19	153	1	0	4		22
2020-03-31	1,602	51	5	25	140	2	0	6		23
2020-04-01	1,759	54	6	26	157	1	1	1		24
2020-04-02	1,906	56	6	26	141	2	0	0		25
2020-04-03	2,113	61	6	26	203	5	0	0		26
2020-04-04	2,547	70	8	30	434	9	2	4		27
2020-04-05	2,914	88	9	33	367	18	1	3		28
2020-04-06	3,610	164	17	33	468	41	5	0		29
2020-04-07	4,289	164	17	33	792	41	5	0		30
2020-04-08	5,194	218	20	33	981	54	3	0		31
2020-04-09	6,175	330	21	33	905	112	1	0		32
2020-04-10	7,359	424	27	33	1184	94	6	0		33
2020-04-11	8,313	482	30	36	954	58	3	3		34
2020-04-12	9,653	621	34	39	1340	139	4	3		35
2020-04-13	11,223	803	39	42	1570	182	5	3		36
2020-04-14	13,128	1,012	46	42	1905	209	7	0		37
2020-04-15	14,868	1,231	50	49	1740	219	4	7		38
2020-04-16	17,003	1,572	60	49	2135	341	10	0		39
2020-04-17	19,193	1,838	75	58	2190	266	15	9		40
2020-04-18	21,307	2,144	84	66	2114	306	9	8		41
2020-04-19	23,941	2,456	91	75	2,634	312	7	9		42
2020-04-20	26,604	2,948	101	85	2,779	492	10	10		43
2020-04-21	29,578	3,382	110	87	2,974	434	9	2		44
2020-04-22	32,630	3,772	120	92	3,043	390	10	5		45
2020-04-23	36,090	4,186	127	108	3,460	414	7	16		46
2020-04-24	39,476	4,689	131	112	3,386	503	4	4		47
2020-04-25	43,113	4,998	140	113	3,637	309	9	1		48
2020-04-26	46,589	5,416	145	122	3,476	418	5	9		49
2020-04-27	50,401	5,913	152	131	3,812	497	7	9		50
2020-04-28	54,733	6,462	155	139	4,332	549	3	8		51
2020-04-29	59,701	7,103	163	150	4,968	641	8	11		52
2020-04-30	64,666	7,667	168	160	4,965	564	5	10		53
2020-05-01	70,239	8,238	170	174	5,573	571	2	14		54
2020-05-02	76,066	8,790	175	177	5,827	552	5	3		55
2020-05-03	81,434	9,455	177	1,063	5,368	665	2	886	The total number of recoveries surged and crossed 1,000 marks, according to new guidelines.	56
2020-05-04	87,694	10,143	182	1,209	6,260	688	5	146		57
2020-05-05	93,405	10,929	183	1,403	5,711	786	1	194		58
2020-05-06	99,646	11,719	186	1,403	6,241	790	3	0		59
2020-05-07	105,513	12,425	199	1,910	5,867	706	13	507		60
2020-05-08	111,454	13,134	206	2,101	5,941	709	7	191		61
2020-05-09	116,919	13,770	214	2,414	5,518	636	8	313		62
2020-05-10	122,657	14,657	228	2,650	5,738	887	14	236		63
2020-05-11	129,865	15,691	239	2,902	7,208	1,034	11	252		64
2020-05-12	136,638	16,660	250	3,147	6,773	969	11	245		65
2020-05-13	144,538	17,822	269	3,361	7,900	1,162	19	214		66
2020-05-14	151,930	18,863	283	3,603	7,392	1,041	14	242		67
2020-05-15	160,512	20,065	298	3,882	8,582	1,202	15	279		68
2020-05-16	167,114	20,995	314	4,117	6,602	930	16	235		69
2020-05-17	175,228	22,268	328	4,373	8,114	1,273	14	256		70
2020-05-18	185,086	23,870	349	4,585	9,858	1,602	21	212		71
2020-05-19	193,645	25,121	370	4,993	8,559	1,251	21	408		72
2020-05-20	203,852	26,738	386	5,207	10,207	1,617	16	214		73
2020-05-21	214,114	28,511	408	5,602	10,262	1,773	22	395		74
2020-05-22	223,841	30,205	432	6,190	9,727	1,694	24	588		75
2020-05-23	234,675	32,078	452	6,486	10,834	1,873	20	296		76
2020-05-24	243,583	33,610	480	6,901	8,908	1,532	28	415		77
2020-05-25	253,034	35,585	501	7,334	9,451	1,975	21	433		78
2020-05-26	258,550	36,751	522	7,579	5,516	1,166	21	245		79
2020-05-27	266,456	38,292	544	7,925	7,906	1,541	22	346		80
2020-05-28	275,776	40,321	559	8,425	9,320	2,029	15	500		81
2020-05-29	287,067	42,844	582	9,015	11,291	2,523	23	590		82
2020-05-30	297,054	44,608	610	9,375	9,987	1,764	28	360		83
2020-05-31	308,930	47,153	650	9,781	11,876	2,545	40	406		84
2020-06-01	320,969	49,534	672	10,597	12,039	2,381	22	816		85
2020-06-02	333,073	52,445	709	11,120	12,104	2,911	37	523		86
2020-06-03	345,583	55,140	746	11,590	12,510	2,695	37	470		87
2020-06-04	358,277	57,563	781	12,161	12,694	2,423	35	571		88
2020-06-05	372,365	60,391	811	12,804	14,088	2,828	30	643		89
2020-06-06	384,851	63,026	846	13,325	12,486	2,635	35	521		90
2020-06-07	397,987	65,769	888	13,903	13,136	2,743	42	578		91
2020-06-08	410,841	68,504	930	14,560	12,854	2,735	42	657		92
2020-06-09	425,595	71,675	975	15,337	14,754	3,171	45	777		93
2020-06-10	441,560	74,865	1,012	15,900	15,965	3,190	37	563		94
2020-06-11	457,332	78,052	1,049	16,747	15,772	3,187	37	847		95
2020-06-12	473,322	81,523	1,095	17,249	15,990	3,471	46	502		96
2020-06-13	489,960	84,379	1,139	17,827	16,638	2,856	44	578	The total number of coronavirus cases in Bangladesh exceeded the total number of coronavirus cases in China.	97
2020-06-14	501,465	87,520	1,171	18,730	14,505	3,141	32	903		98
2020-06-15	516,503	90,619	1,209	34,027	15,038	3,099	38	15,297	Bangladesh saw a sharp surge in the total number of recoveries two days after overtaking China in terms of coronavirus infections. Dr. Nasima Sultana said that over 15,000 patients recovered from COVID-19. The patients who recovered from COVID-19 included both symptomatic and asymptomatic patients. The recoveries occurred not only in hospital, but also at home.	99
2020-06-16	533,717	94,481	1,262	36,264	17,214	3,862	53	2,237		100
2020-06-17	551,244	98,489	1,305	38,189	17,527	4,008	43	1,925		101
2020-06-18	567,503	102,292	1,343	40,164	16,259	3,803	38	1,975		102
2020-06-19	582,548	105,535	1,388	42,945	15,045	3,243	45	2,781		103
2020-06-20	596,579	108,775	1,425	43,993	14,031	3,240	37	1,048		104
2020-06-21	612,164	112,306	1,464	45,077	15,585	3,531	39	1,084		105
2020-06-22	627,719	115,786	1,502	46,755	15,555	3,480	38	1,678		106
2020-06-23	644,011	119,198	1,545	47,635	16,292	3,412	43	880		107
2020-06-24	660,444	122,660	1,582	49,666	16,433	3,462	37	2,031		108
2020-06-25	678,443	126,606	1,621	51,495	17,999	3,946	39	1,829		109
2020-06-26	696,941	130,474	1,661	53,133	18,498	3,868	40	1,638		110
2020-06-27	712,098	133,978	1,695	54,318	15,157	3,504	34	1,185		111
2020-06-28	730,197	137,787	1,738	55,727	18,099	3,809	43	1,409		112
2020-06-29	748,034	141,801	1,783	57,780	17,837	4,014	45	2,053		113
2020-06-30	766,460	145,483	1,847	59,624	18,426	3,682	64	1,844		114
2020-07-01	784,335	149,258	1,888	62,108	17,875	3,775	41	2,484		115
2020-07-02	802,697	153,277	1,926	66,442	18,362	4,019	38	4,334		116
2020-07-03	817,347	156,391	1,968	68,048	14,650	3,114	42	1,606		117
2020-07-04	832,074	159,679	1,997	70,721	14,727	3,288	29	2,673		118
2020-07-05	846,062	162,417	2,052	72,625	13,988	2,738	55	1,904		119
2020-07-06	860,307	165,618	2,096	76,149	14,245	3,201	44	3,524		120
2020-07-07	873,480	168,645	2,151	78,102	13,173	3,027	55	1,953		121
2020-07-08	889,152	172,134	2,197	80,838	15,672	3,489	46	2,736	Bangladesh overtook China in terms of the number of recoveries.	122
2020-07-09	904,784	175,494	2,238	84,544	15,632	3,360	41	3,706		123
2020-07-10	918,272	178,443	2,275	86,406	13,488	2,949	37	1,862		124
2020-07-11	929,465	181,129	2,305	88,034	11,193	2,686	30	1,628		125
2020-07-12	940,524	183,795	2,352	93,614	11,059	2,666	47	5,580		126
2020-07-13	952,947	186,894	2,391	98,317	12,423	3,099	39	4,703		127
2020-07-14	966,400	190,057	2,424	103,227	13,453	3,163	33	4,910		128
2020-07-15	980,402	193,590	2,457	105,523	14,002	3,533	33	2,296		129
2020-07-16	993,291	196,323	2,496	106,963	12,889	2,733	39	1,440		130
2020-07-17	1,009,751	199,357	2,547	108,725	13,460	3,034	51	1,762		131
2020-07-18	1,020,674	202,066	2,581	110,098	10,923	2,709	34	1,373		132
2020-07-19	1031299	204,525	2,618	111,642	10,625	2,549	37	1544		133
2020-07-20	1044661	207,453	2,668	113,556	13,362	2,928	50	1914		134
2020-07-21	10,54,559	210,510	2,709	115,399	12,898	3,057	39	1843		135
2020-07-22	1,066,609	213,254	2,751	117,202	12,050	2,744	42	1803		136
2020-07-23	1,079,007	216,110	2,801	119,208	12,398	2,856	50	2006		137
2020-07-24	1,091,034	218,658	2,836	120,976	12,027	2,548	35	1768		138
2020-07-25	1,101,480	221,178	2,874	122,090	10,446	2,520	38	1,114		139
2020-07-26	1,111,558	223,453	2,928	123,882	10,078	2,275	54	1,792		140
2020-07-27	1,124,417	226,225	2,965	125,683	12,859	2,772	37	1,801		141
2020-07-28	1,137,131	229,185	3,000	127,414	12,714	2,960	35	1,731		142
2020-07-29	1,151,258	232,194	3,035	130,292	14,127	3,009	35	2,878		143
2020-07-30	1,164,195	234,889	3,083	132,960	12,937	2,695	48	2,668		144
2020-07-31	1,176,809	237,661	3,111	135,136	12,614	2,772	28	2,176		145
2020-08-01	1,185,611	239,807	3,132	136,253	8,802	2,199	21	1,117		146
2020-08-02	1,189,295	240,746	3,154	136,839	3,684	886	22	568		147
2020-08-03	1,193,544	242,102	3,184	137,905	4,249	1,356	30	1,066		148
2020-08-04	1,201,256	244,020	3,234	139,860	7,712	1,918	50	1,955		149
2020-08-05	1,212,416	246,674	3,267	141,750	11,160	2,654	33	1,890		150
2020-08-06	1,225,124	249,651	3,306	143,824	12,708	2,977	39	2,074		151
2020-08-07	1,237,823	252,502	3,333	145,584	12,699	2,851	27	1,760		152
2020-08-08	1,249,560	255,113	3,365	146,604	11,737	2,611	32	1,020		153
2020-08-09	1,260,319	257,600	3,399	148,370	10,759	2,487	34	1,766		154
2020-08-10	1,273,168	260,507	3,438	150,437	12,849	2,907	39	2,076		155
2020-08-11	1,287,988	263,503	3,471	151,972	14,820	2,996	33	1,535		156
2020-08-12	1,302,739	266,498	3,513	153,089	14,751	2,995	42	1,117		157
2020-08-13	1,315,901	269,115	3,557	154,871	13,162	2,617	44	1,782		158
2020-08-14	1,328,754	271,881	3,591	156,623	12,856	2,766	34	1,752		159
2020-08-15	1,341,645	274,525	3,625	157,635	12,891	2,644	34	1,012		160
2020-08-16	1,351,663	276,549	3,657	158,950	10,018	2,024	32	1,315		161
2020-08-17	1,364,186	279,144	3,694	158,950	12,523	2,595	37	1,641		162
2020-08-18	1,378,820	282,344	3,740	162,825	14,634	3,200	46	3,234		163
2020-08-19	1,393,498	285,091	3,781	165,738	14,678	2,747	41	2,913		164
2020-08-20	1,407,557	287,959	3,822	168,991	14,059	2,868	41	3,253		165
2020-08-21	1,420,500	290,360	3,861	172,615	12,943	2,401	39	3,624		166
2020-08-22	1,431,865	292,625	3,907	175,567	11,365	2,265	46	2,952		167
2020-08-23	1,442,666	294,598	3,941	179,091	10,801	1,973	34	3,524		168
2020-08-24	1,456,048	297,083	3,941	182,875	13,382	2,485	42	3,784		169
2020-08-25	1,470,201	299,628	4,028	186,756	14,153	2,545	45	3,881		170
2020-08-26	1,485,271	302,147	4,082	190,183	15,070	2,519	54	3,427		171
2020-08-27	1,500,395	304,583	4,127	193,458	15,124	2,436	45	3,275		172
2020-08-28	1,514,036	306,794	4,174	196,836	13,741	2,211	47	3,378		173
2020-08-29	1,525,825	308,925	4,206	198,863	11,689	2,131	32	2,027		174
2020-08-30	1,537,759	310,822	4,248	201,907	11,934	1,897	42	3,044		175
2020-08-31	1,550,213	312,996	4,281	204,887	12,454	2,174	33	2,980		176
2020-09-01	1,562,422	314,946	4,316	208,117	12,209	1,950	35	3,290		177
2020-09-02	1,577,624	317,528	4,351	211,016	15,204	2,582	35	2,839		178
2020-09-03	1,592,046	319,686	4,383	213,980	14,422	2,298	32	2,964		179
2020-09-04	1,605,119	321,615	4,412	216,191	13,073	1,929	29	2,211		180
2020-09-05	1,617,966	323,565	4,447	217,852	12,847	1,950	35	1,661		181
2020-09-06	1,629,320	325,157	4,479	221,275	11,354	1,592	32	3,423		182
2020-09-07	1,644,732	327,359	4,516	224,573	15,412	2,202	37	3,298		183
2020-09-08	1,659,705	329,251	4,552	227,809	14,973	1,892	36	3,236		184
2020-09-09	1,674,460	331,078	4,593	230,804	14,755	1,827	41	2,999		185
2020-09-10	1,690,011	332,970	4,634	233,550	15,559	1,892	41	2,746		186
2020-09-11	1,704,758	334,762	4,668	236,024	14,747	1,792	34	2,474		187
2020-09-12	1,715,481	336,044	4,702	238,271	10,723	1,282	34	2,247		188
2020-09-13	1,728,480	337,520	4,733	240,643	12,999	1,476	31	2,372		189
2020-09-14	1,742,696	339,332	4,759	243,155	14,216	1,812	26	2,512		190
2020-09-15	1,756,746	341,056	4,802	245,594	14,050	1,724	43	2,439		191
2020-09-16	1,770,106	342,671	4,823	247,969	13,360	1,615	21	2,375		192
2020-09-17	1,783,779	344,264	4,859	250,412	13,673	1,593	36	2,243		193
2020-09-18	1,796,509	345,805	4,881	252,335	12,730	1,541	22	1,923		194
2020-09-19	1,809,679	347,372	4,913	254,386	13,170	1,567	32	2,051		195
2020-09-20	1,821,270	348,916	4,939	256,565	11,591	1,544	26	2,079		196
2020-09-21	1,834,237	350,621	4,979	258,717	12,967	1,705	40	2,152		197
2020-09-22	1,848,401	352,178	5,007	260,790	14,164	1,557	28	2,073		198
2020-09-23	1,862,551	353,844	5,044	262,953	14,150	1,666	37	2,163		199
2020-09-24	1,875,451	355,384	5,072	265,092	12,900	1,540	28	2,139		200
2020-09-25	1,887,924	356,767	5,093	267,024	12,473	1,383	21	1,932		201
2020-09-26	1,898,689	357,873	5,129	268,777	10,765	1,106	36	1,753		202
2020-09-27	1,909,374	359,148	5,161	270,491	10,685	1,275	32	1,714		203
2020-09-28	1,921,296	360,555	5,193	272,073	11,922	1,407	32	1,582		204
2020-09-29	1,934,165	362,043	5,219	273,698	12,869	1,488	26	1,625		205
2020-09-30	1,947,569	363,479	5,251	275,487	13,404	1,436	32	1,789		206
2020-10-01	1,958,989	364,987	5,272	277,078	11,420	1,508	21	1,591		207
2020-10-02	1,970,165	366,383	5,305	278,627	11,176	1,396	33	1,549		208
2020-10-03	1,979,719	367,565	5,325	280,069	9,554	1,182	20	1,472		209
2020-10-04	1,989,066	368,690	5,348	281,656	9,859	1,125	23	1,587		210
2020-10-05	2,001,431	370,132	5,375	283,182	11,767	1,442	27	1,526		211
2020-10-06	2,013,776	371,631	5,405	284,833	12,345	1,499	30	1,651		212
2020-10-07	2,026,808	373,151	5,440	286,631	13,088	1,520	35	1,798		213
2020-10-08	2,039,413	374,592	5,460	288,316	12,605	1,441	20	1,685		214
2020-10-09	2,050,669	375,870	5,477	289,912	11,256	1,278	17	1,596		215
2020-10-10	2,061,528	377,073	5,500	291,365	10,859	1,203	23	1,453		216
2020-10-11	2,070,995	378,266	5,524	292,860	9,467	1,193	24	1,495		217
2020-10-12	2,084,222	379,738	5,555	294,391	13,227	1,472	31	1,531		218
2020-10-13	2,094,037	381,275	5,577	295,873	13,815	1,537	22	1,482		219
2020-10-14	2,112,448	382,959	5,593	297,449	14,411	1,684	16	1,576		220
2020-10-15	2,126,552	384,559	5,608	299,229	14,104	1,600	15	1,780		221
2020-10-16	2,140,109	386,086	5,623	300,738	13,577	1,527	15	1,509		222
2020-10-17	2,151,702	387,295	5,646	302,298	11,573	1,209	23	1,560		223
2020-10-18	2,163,568	388,569	5,660	303,972	11,866	1,274	14	1,674		224
2020-10-19	2,178,714	390,206	5,681	305,599	15,146	1,637	21	1,627		225
2020-10-20	2,192,325	391,586	5,699	307,141	13,611	1,380	18	1,542		226
2020-10-21	2,206,411	393,131	5,723	308,845	14,086	1,545	24	1,704		227
2020-10-22	2,221,369	394,827	5,747	310,532	14,958	1,696	24	1,687		228
2020-10-23	2,235,488	396,413	5,761	312,065	14,119	1,586	14	1,533		229
2020-10-24	2,246,486	397,507	5,780	313,563	10,998	1,094	19	1,498		230
2020-10-25	2,258,243	398,815	5,803	315,107	11,757	1,308	23	1,544		231
2020-10-26	2,271,347	400,251	5,818	316,600	13,758	1,436	15	1,493		232
2020-10-27	2,283,964	401,586	5,838	318,123	12,617	1,335	20	1,523		233
2020-10-28	2,296,321	403,079	5,861	319,733	12,357	1,493	23	1,610		234
2020-10-29	2,310,589	404,760	5,886	321,281	14,268	1,681	25	1,548		235
2020-10-30	2,324,730	406,364	5,905	322,703	14,141	1,604	19	1,422		236
2020-10-31	2,336,262	407,684	5,923	324,145	11,532	1,320	18	1,442		237
2020-11-01	2,348,811	409,252	5,941	325,940	12,549	1,568	18	1,795		238
2020-11-02	2,361,702	410,988	5,966	327,901	12,891	1,736	25	1,961		239
2020-11-03	2,375,760	412,647	5,983	329,787	14,061	1,886	17	1,886		240
2020-11-04	2,389,677	414,164	6,004	331,697	13,914	1,517	21	1,910		241
2020-11-05	2,404,902	416,006	6,021	333,588	15,225	1,842	17	1,891		242
2020-11-06	2,417,475	417,475	6,036	335,027	13,521	1,469	15	1,439		243
2020-11-07	2,429,842	418,764	6,049	336,568	11,419	1,289	13	1,541		244
2020-11-08	2,442,602	420,238	6,067	338,145	12,760	1,474	18	1,577		245
2020-11-09	2,456,644	421,921	6,092	339,768	14,042	1,683	25	1,623		246
2020-11-10	2,470,164	423,620	6,108	341,416	13,520	1,699	16	1,648		247
2020-11-11	2,484,688	425,353	6,127	343,131	14,524	1,733	19	1,715		248
2020-11-12	2,501,800	427,198	6,140	344,868	17,112	1,845	13	1,737		249
2020-11-13	2,515,339	428,965	6,159	346,387	13,539	1,767	19	1,519		250
2020-11-14	2,527,134	430,496	6,173	347,489	11,795	1,531	14	1,462		251
2020-11-15	2,541,194	432,333	6,194	349,542	14,060	1,837	21	1,693		252
2020-11-16	2,556,962	434,472	6,215	351,146	15,768	2,139	21	1,604		253
2020-11-17	2,572,952	436,684	6,254	352,895	15,990	2,212	39	1,749		254
2020-11-18	2,589,421	438,795	6,275	354,788	16,469	2,111	21	1,893		255
2020-11-19	2,606,952	441,159	6,305	356,722	17,531	2,364	30	1,934		256
2020-11-20	2,622,559	443,434	6,322	358,431	15,607	2,275	17	1,709		257
2020-11-21	2,635,202	445,281	6,350	360,352	12,643	1,848	28	1,921		258
2020-11-22	2,649,072	447,341	6,388	362,428	13,870	2,060	38	2,076		259
2020-11-23	2,665,131	449,760	6,416	364,611	16,059	2,419	28	2,183		260
2020-11-24	2,680,149	451,990	6,448	366,877	15,018	2,230	32	2,266		261
2020-11-25	2,696,150	454,146	6,487	369,179	16,001	2,156	39	2,302		262
2020-11-26	2,713,202	456,438	6,524	371,453	17,052	2,292	37	2,274		263
2020-11-27	2,729,580	458,711	6,544	373,676	16,378	2,273	20	2,223		264
2020-11-28	2,743,592	460,619	6,580	375,885	14,012	1,908	36	2,209		265
2020-11-29	2,757,329	462,407	6,609	378,172	13,737	1,788	29	2,287		266
2020-11-30	2,772,701	464,932	6,644	380,711	13,737	2,525	35	2,539		267
2020-12-01	2,788,202	467,225	6,675	383,224	15,501	2,293	31	2,513		268
2020-12-02	2,804,174	469,420	6,713	385,786	15,972	2,198	38	2,562		269
2020-12-03	2,820,981	471,739	6,748	388,379	16,807	2,316	35	2,593		270
2020-12-04	2,836,411	473,991	6,772	390,951	15,430	2,252	24	2,572		271
2020-12-05	2,849,951	475,879	6,807	393,408	13,540	1,888	35	2,457		272
2020-12-06	2,863,169	477,545	6,838	395,960	13,218	1,666	31	2,552		273
2020-12-07	2,877,538	479,743	6,874	398,623	14,369	2,198	36	2,663		274
2020-12-08	2,894,622	481,945	6,906	401,194	17,084	2,202	32	2,571		275
2020-12-09	2,911,664	484,104	6,930	405,966	17,042	2,159	24	4,772		276
2020-12-10	2,927,929	485,965	6,967	410,452	16,265	1,861	37	4,486		277
2020-12-11	2,944,252	487,849	6,986	414,318	16,323	1,884	19	3,866		278
2020-12-12	2,956,882	489,178	7,020	417,503	12,630	1,329	34	3,185		279
2020-12-13	2,969,630	490,533	7,052	420,896	12,748	1,355	32	3,393		280
2020-12-14	2,986,458	492,332	7,089	423,845	16,828	1,799	37	2,949		281
2020-12-15	3,005,512	494,209	7,129	426,729	19,054	1,877	40	2,884		282
2020-12-16	3,022,537	495,841	7,156	429,351	17,025	1,632	27	2,622		283
2020-12-17	3,035,728	496,975	7,192	431,590	13,191	1,134	36	2,239		284
2020-12-18	3,050,064	498,293	7,217	433,614	14,336	1,318	25	2,024		285
2020-12-19	3,062,364	499,560	7,242	435,601	12,300	1,267	25	1,987		286
2020-12-20	3,075,680	500,713	7,280	437,527	13,316	1,153	38	1,926		287
2020-12-21	3,091,349	502,183	7,312	439,694	15,669	1,470	32	2,167		288
2020-12-22	3,106,494	503,501	7,329	441,929	15,145	1,318	17	2,235		289
2020-12-23	3,122,426	504,868	7,359	444,345	15,932	1,367	30	2,416		290
2020-12-24	3,135,653	506,102	7,378	446,690	13,227	1,234	19	2,345		291
2020-12-25	3,149,348	507,265	7,398	448,803	13,695	1,163	20	2,113		292
2020-12-26	3,159,260	508,099	7,428	450,488	9,912	834	30	1,685		293
2020-12-27	3,171,910	509,148	7,452	451,961	12,650	1,049	24	1,473		294
2020-12-28	3,184,527	510,080	7,479	453,318	12,617	932	27	1,357		295
2020-12-29	3,199,115	511,261	7,509	454,563	14,588	1,181	30	1,245		296
2020-12-30	3,214,344	512,496	7,531	456,070	15,229	1,235	22	1,507		297
2020-12-31	3,227,598	513,510	7,559	457,459	13,254	1,014	28	1,389		298
2021-01-01	3,239,701	514,500	7,576	458,656	12,103	990	17	1,197		299
2021-01-02	3,249,402	515,184	7,599	459,620	9,701	684	23	964		300
2021-01-03	3,260,327	516,019	7,626	460,598	10,925	835	27	978		301
2021-01-04	3,272,423	516,929	7,650	461,515	12,096	910	24	917		302
2021-01-05	3,286,885	517,920	7,670	462,459	14,462	991	20	944		303
2021-01-06	3,302,429	518,898	7,687	463,480	15,544	978	17	1,021		304
2021-01-07	3,317,810	519,905	7,718	464,446	15,381	1,007	31	966		305
2021-01-08	3,331,491	520,690	7,734	465,279	13,681	785	16	833		306
2021-01-09	3,344,399	521,382	7,756	466,064	12,908	692	22	785		307
2021-01-10	3,357,319	522,453	7,781	466,801	12,920	1,071	25	737		308
2021-01-11	3,371,416	523,302	7,803	467,718	14,097	849	22	917		309
2021-01-12	3,385,779	524,020	7,819	468,692	14,363	718	16	974		310
2021-01-13	3,401,506	524,910	7,833	469,522	15,727	890	14	841		311
2021-01-14	3,418,114	525,723	7,849	470,405	16,608	813	16	883		312
2021-01-15	3,431,792	526,485	7,862	471,123	13,678	762	13	718		313
2021-01-16	3,444,007	527,063	7,883	471,756	12,215	578	21	633		314
2021-01-17	3,457,453	527,632	7,906	472,437	13,446	569	23	681		315
2021-01-18	3,470,160	528,329	7,922	473,173	12,707	697	29	736		316
2021-01-19	3,485,257	529,031	7,942	473,855	15,097	702	20	682		317
2021-01-20	3,500,667	529,687	7,950	474,472	15,410	656	8	617		318
2021-01-21	3,515,428	530,271	7,966	475,074	14,761	584	16	602		319
2021-01-22	3,530,274	530,890	7,981	475,561	14,846	619	15	487		320
2021-01-23	3,541,389	531,326	8,003	475,899	11,115	436	22	338		321
2021-01-24	3,555,558	531,799	8,023	476,413	14,169	473	20	514		322
2021-01-25	3,570,387	532,401	8,041	476,979	14,829	602	18	566		323
2021-01-26	3,584,788	532,916	8,055	477,426	14,401	515	14	447		324
2021-01-27	3,600,508	533,444	8,072	477,935	15,932	528	17	509		325
2021-01-28	3,615,338	533,953	8,087	478,546	14,830	509	15	611		326
2021-01-29	3,627,413	534,407	8,094	478,960	12,075	454	7	414		327
2021-01-30	3,639,497	534,770	8,111	479,297	12,084	363	17	336		328
2021-01-31	3,651,722	535,139	8,127	479,744	12,225	369	16	447		329
2021-02-01	3,664,197	535,582	8,137	480,216	12,475	443	10	472		330
2021-02-02	3,678,649	536,107	8,149	480,728	14,452	525	12	512		331
2021-02-03	3,693,634	536,545	8,162	481,306	14,985	438	13	578		332
2021-02-04	3,708,907	537,030	8,175	481,917	15,273	485	13	611		333
2021-02-05	3,724,473	537,465	8,182	482,424	15,566	435	7	507		334
2021-02-06	3,736,608	537,770	8,190	482,841	12,135	305	8	417		335
2021-02-07	3,749,012	538,062	8,205	483,372	12,404	292	15	417		336
2021-02-08	3,762,774	538,378	8,221	483,931	13,762	316	16	559		337
2021-02-09	3,777,242	538,765	8,229	484,573	14,468	387	8	642		338
2021-02-10	3,792,241	539,153	8,239	485,290	14,999	388	10	717		339
2021-02-11	3,808,017	539,571	8,248	485,971	15,776	418	9	681		340
2021-02-12	3,822,435	539,975	8,253	486,393	14,328	404	5	422		341
2021-02-13	3,835,216	540,266	8,266	486,767	12,871	291	13	374		342
2021-02-14	3,848,116	540,592	8,274	487,229	12,900	326	8	462		343
2021-02-15	3,862,254	541,038	8,285	487,870	14,138	446	11	641		344
2021-02-16	3,877,042	541,434	8,298	488,621	14,788	396	13	751		345
2021-02-17	3,893,654	541,877	8,314	489,254	16,612	443	16	633		346
2021-02-18	3,908,257	542,268	8,329	489,932	14,603	391	15	678		347
2021-02-19	3,922,489	542,674	8,337	490,468	14,232	536	8	536		348
2021-02-20	3,933,637	543,024	8,342	490,892	11,148	350	5	424		349
2021-02-21	3,947,673	543,351	8,349	491,367	14,036	475	7	475		350
2021-02-22	3,958,776	543,717	8,356	492,059	11,103	366	7	692		351
2021-02-23	3,971,524	544,116	8,374	492,887	12,748	399	18	828		352
2021-02-24	3,987,676	544,544	8,379	493,798	16,152	428	5	911		353
2021-02-25	4,003,236	544,954	8,384	494,755	15,560	410	5	957		354
2021-02-26	4,018,268	545,424	8,395	495,498	15,032	470	11	743		355
2021-02-27	4,030,616	545,831	8,400	496,107	12,348	407	5	609		356
2021-02-28	4,044,027	546,216	8,408	496,924	13,411	385	8	817		357
2021-03-01	4,057,597	546,801	8,416	497,797	13,570	585	8	873		358
2021-03-02	4,072,922	547,316	8,423	498,691	15,523	515	7	894		359
2021-03-03	4,089,336	547,930	8,428	499,624	16,458	614	5	936		360
2021-03-04	4,105,321	548,549	8,435	500,468	15,985	619	7	841		361
2021-03-05	4,119,031	549,184	8,441	501,144	13,710	635	6	676		362
2021-03-06	4,132,113	549,724	8,451	501,966	13,082	540	10	822		363
2021-03-07	4,146,205	550,330	8,462	503,003	14,092	606	11	1,037		364
2021-03-08	4,163,163	551,175	8,476	504,120	16,958	845	14	1,117		365
2021-03-09	4,180,938	552,087	8,489	505,349	17,775	912	13	1,229		366
2021-03-10	4,197,970	553,105	8,496	506,613	17,032	1,018	7	1,264		367
2021-03-11	4,216,028	554,156	8,502	507,920	18,058	1,051	6	1,307		368
2021-03-12	4,232,139	555,222	8,515	509,172	16,111	1,066	13	1,252		369
2021-03-13	4,248,345	556,236	8,527	510,310	16,206	1,014	12	1,138		370
2021-03-14	4,264,551	557,395	8,545	511,695	16,206	1,159	18	1,385		371
2021-03-15	4,283,246	559,168	8,571	513,127	18,695	1,773	26	1,432		372
2021-03-16	4,303,994	560,887	8,597	514,479	20,748	1,719	26	1,352		373
2021-03-17	4,328,269	562,752	8,608	515,989	24,275	1,865	11	1,510		374
2021-03-18	4,349,194	564,939	8,624	517,523	20,925	2,187	16	1,534		375
2021-03-19	4,368,111	566,838	8,642	519,141	18,917	1,899	18	1,618		376
2021-03-20	4,388,011	568,706	8,668	520,718	19,900	1,868	26	1,577		377
2021-03-21	4,409,119	570,878	8,690	522,405	21,108	2,172	22	1,687		378
2021-03-22	4,434,230	573,687	8,720	524,159	25,111	2,809	30	1,754		379
2021-03-23	4,460,184	577,241	8,738	525,994	25,954	3554	18	1835		380
2021-03-24	4,487,686	580,808	8,763	527,909	27,502	3,567	25	1915		381
2021-03-25	4,514,731	584,395	8,797	529,894	27,045	3587	34	1985		382
2021-03-26	4,542,030	588,132	8,830	531,951	27,299	3737	33	2057		383
2021-03-27	4,566,694	591,806	8,869	533,922	24,664	3,674	39	1971		384
2021-03-28	4,588,830	595,714	8,904	535,941	22,136	3908	35	2019		385
2021-03-29	4,617,025	600,895	8,949	538,018	28,195	5,181	45	2077		386
2021-03-30	4,643,645	605,937	8,994	540,180	26,620	5,042	45	2162		387
2021-03-31	4,670,576	611,295	9,046	542,399	26,931	5,358	52	2,219		388
2021-04-01	4,698,774	617,764	9,105	544,938	28,198	6,469	59	2,539		389
2021-04-02	4,728,113	624,594	9,155	547,411	29,339	6,830	50	2,473		390
2021-04-03	4,752,661	630,277	9,213	549,775	24,548	5,683	58	2,364		391
2021-04-04	4,783,385	637,364	9,266	552,482	30,724	7,087	53	2,707		392
2021-04-05	4,813,624	644,439	9,318	555,414	30,239	7,075	52	2,932		393
2021-04-06	4,847,935	651,652	9,384	558,383	34,311	7,213	66	2,969		394
2021-04-07	4,882,565	659,278	9,447	561,639	34,630	7,626	63	3,256		395
2021-04-08	4,915,758	666,132	9,521	565,030	33,193	6,854	74	3,391		396
2021-04-09	4,947,412	673,594	9,584	568,541	31,654	7,462	63	3,511		397
2021-04-10	4,973,489	678,937	9,661	572,378	26,077	5,343	77	3,837		398
2021-04-11	5,002,865	684,756	9,739	576,590	29,376	5,819	78	4,212		399
2021-04-12	5,037,833	691,957	9,822	581,113	34,968	7,201	83	4,523		400
2021-04-13	5,070,788	697,985	9,891	585,966	32,955	6,028	69	4,853		401
2021-04-14	5,095,613	703,170	9,987	591,299	24,825	5,185	96	5,333		402
2021-04-15	5,115,572	707,362	10,081	597,214	19,959	4,192	94	5,915		403
2021-04-16	5,134,478	711,779	10,182	602,908	18,906	4,417	101	5,694		404
2021-04-17	5,150,663	715,252	10,283	608,815	16,185	3,473	101	5,907		405
2021-04-18	5,170,067	718,950	10,385	614,936	19,404	3,698	102	6,121		406
2021-04-19	5,194,219	723,221	10,497	621,300	24,152	4,271	112	6,364		407
2021-04-20	5,221,275	727,780	10,588	628,111	27,056	4,559	91	6,811		408
2021-04-21	5,249,683	732,060	10,683	635,183	28,408	4,280	95	7,072		409
2021-04-22	5,277,112	736,074	10,781	642,449	27,429	4,014	98	7,266		410
2021-04-23	5,303,008	739,703	10,869	647,674	25,896	3,629	88	5,225		411
2021-04-24	5,323,579	742,400	10,952	653,151	20,571	2,697	83	5,477		412
2021-04-25	5,345,501	745,322	11,053	657,452	21,922	2,922	101	4,301		413
2021-04-26	5,371,287	748,628	11,150	661,693	25,786	3,306	97	4,241		414
2021-04-27	5,395,524	751,659	11,288	666,927	24,237	3,031	78	5,234		415
2021-04-28	5,423,730	754,614	11,305	672,319	28,206	2,955	77	5,392		416
2021-04-29	5,448,658	756,955	11,393	677,101	24,928	2,341	88	4,782		417
2021-04-30	5,469,704	759,132	11,450	681,426	21,046	2,177	57	4,325		418
2021-05-01	5,484,821	760,584	11,510	684,671	15,117	1,452	60	3,245		419
2021-05-02	5,498,979	761,943	11,579	687,328	14,158	1,359	69	2,657		420
2021-05-03	5,518,410	763,682	11,644	691,162	19,431	1,739	65	3,834		421
2021-05-04	5,540,394	765,596	11,705	695,032	21,984	1,914	61	3,870		422
2021-05-05	5,560,678	767,338	11,755	698,465	20,284	1,742	50	3,433		423
2021-05-06	5,582,263	769,160	11,796	702,163	21,585	1,822	41	3,698		424
2021-05-07	5,599,276	770,842	11,833	704,341	17,013	1,682	37	2,178		425
2021-05-08	5,613,979	772,127	11,878	706,833	14,703	1,285	45	2,492		426
2021-05-09	5,630,894	773,513	11,934	710,162	16,915	1,386	56	3,329		427
2021-05-10	5,647,742	775,027	11,972	712,227	16,848	1,514	38	2,115		428
2021-05-11	5,661,926	776,257	12,005	715,321	14,184	1,230	32	3,004		429
2021-05-12	5,677,222	777,397	12,045	718,249	15,296	1,140	40	2,928		430
2021-05-13	5,690,693	778,687	12,076	719,619	13,471	1,290	31	1,370		431
2021-05-14	5,698,528	779,535	12,102	720,471	7,835	848	26	852		432
2021-05-15	5,702,286	779,796	12,124	721,435	3,758	261	22	964		433
2021-05-16	5,707,716	780,159	12,149	722,036	5,430	363	25	601		434
2021-05-17	5,718,063	780,857	12,181	723,094	10,347	698	32	1,058		435
2021-05-18	5,724,209	782,129	12,211	724,209	16,855	1,272	30	1,115		436
2021-05-19	5,755,446	783,737	12,248	726,132	20,528	1,608	37	1,923		437
2021-05-20	5,774,883	785,184	12,284	727,510	19,437	1,457	36	1,378		438
2021-05-21	5,793,177	786,698	12,310	729,039	18,294	1,504	26	1,529		439
2021-05-22	5,805,407	787,726	12,348	729,798	12,230	1,028	38	759		440
2021-05-23	5,817,612	789,080	12,376	730,697	15,205	1,354	28	899		441
2021-05-24	5,835,295	790,521	12,401	731,531	17,683	1,441	25	834		442
2021-05-25	5,854,919	792,196	12,441	732,810	16,624	1,675	40	1,279		443
2021-05-26	5,871,353	793,693	12,458	733,866	16,434	1,497	17	1,056		444
2021-05-27	5,887,268	794,985	12,480	735,157	15,915	1,292	22	1,291		445
2021-05-28	5,901,874	796,343	12,511	736,221	14,606	1,358	31	1,064		446
2021-05-29	5,915,058	797,386	12,549	737,408	13,184	1,043	38	1,187		447
2021-05-30	5,929,335	798,830	12,583	738,805	14,277	1,444	34	1,397		448
2021-05-31	5,947,513	800,540	12,619	740,372	18,178	1,710	36	1,567		449
2021-06-01	5,965,763	802,305	12,660	742,151	18,250	1,765	41	1,779		450
2021-06-02	5,986,022	804,293	12,694	744,065	20,259	1,988	34	1,914		451
2021-06-03	6,002,994	805,980	12,724	746,035	16,972	1,687	30	1,970		452
2021-06-04	6,021,145	807,867	12,758	747,758	18,151	1,887	34	1,723		453
2021-06-05	6,034,260	809,314	12,801	749,425	13,115	1,447	43	1,667		454
2021-06-06	6,049,873	810,990	12,839	751,322	15,613	1,676	38	1,897		455
2021-06-07	6,067,042	812,960	12,869	753,240	17,169	1,970	30	1,918		456
2021-06-08	6,086,207	815,282	12,913	755,302	19,165	2,322	44	2,062		457
2021-06-09	6,106,791	817,819	12,949	757,569	20,584	2,537	36	2,267		458
2021-06-10	6,126,238	820,395	12,989	759,630	19,447	2,576	40	2,061		459
2021-06-11	6,144,773	822,849	13,032	761,916	18,535	2,454	43	2,286		460
2021-06-12	6,156,363	824,486	13,071	764,024	11,590	1,637	39	2,108		461
2021-06-13	6,175,112	826,922	13,118	766,266	18,749	2,436	47	2,242		462
2021-06-14	6,195,714	829,972	13,172	768,830	20,602	3,050	54	2,564		463
2021-06-15	6,218,979	833,291	13,222	771,073	23,265	3,319	50	2,243		464
2021-06-16	6,242,786	837,247	13,282	773,752	23,807	3,956	60	2,679		465
2021-06-17	6,267,657	841,087	13,345	776,466	24,871	3,840	63	2,714		466
2021-06-18	6,288,539	844,970	13,399	778,421	20,882	3,883	54	1,955		467
2021-06-19	6,305,503	848,027	13,466	780,146	16,694	3,057	67	1,725		468
2021-06-20	6,327,704	851,668	13,548	782,655	22,231	3,641	82	2,509		469
2021-06-21	6,351,791	856,304	13,626	785,482	24,057	4,636	78	2,827		470
2021-06-22	6,376,819	861,150	13,702	788,385	25,028	4,846	76	2,903		471
2021-06-23	6,405,075	866,877	13,787	791,553	28,256	5,727	85	3,168		472
2021-06-24	6,435,466	872,935	13,868	794,783	30,391	6,058	81	3,230		473
2021-06-25	6,463,119	878,804	13,976	797,559	27,653	5,869	108	2,776		474
2021-06-26	6,482,381	883,138	14,053	800,854	19,262	4,334	77	3,295		475
2021-06-27	6,506,781	888,406	14,172	804,103	24,400	5,268	119	3,295		476
2021-06-28	6,541,840	896,770	14,276	807,673	35,059	8,364	104	3,570		477
2021-06-29	6,573,822	904,436	14,388	811,700	31,982	7,666	112	4,027		478
2021-06-30	6,608,927	913,258	14,503	815,250	35,105	8,822	115	4,550		479
2021-07-01	6,640,982	921,559	14,646	820,913	32,055	8,301	143	4,663		480
2021-07-02	6,670,994	930,042	14,778	825,422	30,012	8,483	132	4,509		481
2021-07-03	6,693,681	936,256	14,912	829,199	22,687	6,214	134	3,777		482
2021-07-04	6,723,560	944,917	15,065	833,897	29,879	8,661	153	4,698		483
2021-07-05	6,757,562	954,881	15,229	839,082	34,002	9,964	164	5,185		484
2021-07-06	6,794,193	966,406	15,392	844,515	36,631	11,525	163	5,433		485
2021-07-07	6,829,832	977,568	15,593	850,502	35,639	11,162	201	5,987		486
2021-07-08	6,866,682	989,219	15,792	856,346	36,850	11,651	199	5,844		487
2021-07-09	6,903,268	1,000,543	16,004	862,384	36,586	11,324	212	6,038		488
2021-07-10	6,931,148	1,009,315	16,189	868,139	27,884	8,772	185	5,755		489
2021-07-11	6,971,167	1,021,189	16,419	874,501	40,015	11,874	230	6,362		490
2021-07-12	7,015,234	1,034,957	16,639	881,551	44,067	13,768	220	7,020		491
2021-07-13	7,056,989	1,047,155	16,842	889,167	41,755	12,198	203	7,646		492
2021-07-14	7,099,479	1,059,538	17,052	897,412	42,490	12,383	210	8,245		493
2021-07-15	7,144,420	1,071,774	17,278	905,807	44,941	12,236	226	8,395		494
2021-07-16	7,186,365	1,083,922	17,465	914,343	41,945	12,148	187	8,536		495
2021-07-17	7,215,581	1,092,411	17,669	923,163	29,214	8,489	204	8,820		496
2021-07-18	7,255,387	1,103,989	17,894	932,008	39,806	11,578	225	8,845		497
2021-07-19	7,300,399	1,117,310	18,125	941,343	45,012	13,321	231	9,335		498
2021-07-20	7,339,909	1,128,889	18,325	951,340	39,510	11,579	200	9,997		499
2021-07-21	7,364,888	1,136,503	18,498	961,044	24,979	7,614	173	9,704		500
2021-07-22	7,376,374	1,140,200	18,685	969,610	11,486	3,697	187	8,566		501
2021-07-23	7,396,867	1,146,564	18,851	978,616	20,493	6,364	166	9,006		502
2021-07-24	7,417,694	1,153,344	19,046	988,339	20,827	6,780	195	9,723		503
2021-07-25	7,455,281	1,164,635	19,274	988,923	37,587	11,291	228	10,584		504
2021-07-26	7,506,233	1,179,827	19,521	1,009,975	50,952	15,192	247	11,052		505
2021-07-27	7,558,711	1,194,752	19,779	1,022,414	52,478	14,925	258	12,439		506
2021-07-28	7,612,588	1,210,982	20,016	1,035,884	53,877	16,230	237	13,470		507
2021-07-29	7,684,870	1,226,253	20,255	1,050,220	52,282	15,271	239	14,336		508
2021-07-30	7,709,914	1,240,115	20,467	1,064,195	45,044	13,972	212	13,975		509
2021-07-31	7,740,894	1,249,484	20,685	1,087,212	30,980	9,369	218	14,017		510
2021-08-01	7,790,423	1,264,328	20,916	1,093,266	49,529	14,844	231	15,054		511
2021-08-02	7,843,885	1,280,317	21,162	1,108,748	53,462	15,989	246	15,482		512
2021-08-03	7,899,169	1,296,093	21,397	1,125,045	55,284	15,776	235	16,297		513
2021-08-04	7,948,863	1,309,910	21,638	1,141,157	49,514	13,817	241	16,112		514
2021-08-05	7,995,678	1,322,654	21,902	1,156,943	46,995	12,744	264	15,786		515
2021-08-06	8,043,693	1,335,260	22,150	1,172,437	48,015	12,606	248	15,494		516
2021-08-07	8,075,407	1,343,396	22,411	1,188,820	31,714	8,136	261	16,383		517
2021-08-08	8,117,410	1,353,695	22,652	1,205,447	42,003	10,299	241	16,627		518
2021-08-09	8,164,617	1,365,158	22,897	1,219,859	47,207	11,463	245	14,412		519
2021-08-10	8,212,041	1,376,322	23,161	1,234,762	47,424	11,164	264	14,903		520
2021-08-11	8,256,471	1,386,742	23,313	1,248,075	44,430	10,420	237	13,313		521
2021-08-12	8,301,549	1,396,868	23,613	1,262,065	45,087	10,126	215	13,990		522
2021-08-13	8,342,190	1,405,333	23,810	1,273,522	40,641	8,465	197	11,547		523
2021-08-14	8,375,520	1,412,218	23,988	1,281,327	33,330	6,885	178	7,805		524
2021-08-15	8,408,521	1,418,902	24,175	1,292,698	33,001	6,684	187	11,371		525
2021-08-16	8,441,536	1,425,861	24,349	1,301,966	33,015	6,959	174	9,268		526
2021-08-17	8,480,814	1,433,396	24,547	1,314,916	39,278	7,535	198	12,950		527
2021-08-18	8,521,828	1,440,644	24,719	1,327,028	41,014	7,248	172	12,112		528
2021-08-19	8,559,054	1,447,210	24,878	1,337,181	37,226	6,566	159	10,153		529
2021-08-20	8,593,946	1,453,203	25,023	1,347,755	34,892	5,993	145	10,574		530
2021-08-21	8,617,828	1,457,194	25,143	1,355,421	23,882	3,991	120	7,666		531
2021-08-22	8,650,517	1,461,998	25,282	1,363,874	31,689	4,804	139	8,453		532
2021-08-23	8,687,306	1,467,715	25,399	1,372,856	36,789	5,717	117	8,982		533
2021-08-24	8,721,014	1,472,964	25,513	1,381,783	34,708	5,249	114	8,907		534
2021-08-25	8,754,654	1,477,930	25,627	1,389,571	33,640	4,966	114	7,808		535
2021-08-26	8,787,765	1,482,628	25,729	1,397,885	33,111	4,698	102	8,314		536
2021-08-27	8,815,043	1,486,156	25,846	1,404,370	27,578	3,525	117	6,485		537
2021-08-28	8,840,172	1,489,589	25,926	1,409,231	25,129	3,436	80	4,861		538
2021-08-29	8,868,093	1,493,537	26,015	1,415,697	27,921	3,948	89	6,466		539
2021-08-30	8,898,948	1,497,261	26,109	1,421,883	30,855	3,724	94	6,186		540
2021-08-31	8,928,345	1,500,618	26,195	1,425,985	28,097	3,357	86	3,397		541
2021-09-01	8,958,639	1,503,680	26,274	1,431,984	30,294	3,062	79	5,999		542
2021-09-02	8,991,664	1,507,116	26,362	1,437,885	33,025	3,463	88	5,901		543
2021-09-03	9,021,102	1,510,283	26,432	1,442,582	29,438	3,167	70	4,697		544
2021-09-04	9,038,852	1,512,026	26,493	1,446,003	17,750	1,743	61	3,421		545
2021-09-05	9,064,015	1,514,456	26,563	1,451,063	25,163	2,430	70	5,060		546
2021-09-06	9,091,610	1,517,166	26,628	1,455,187	27,595	2,710	65	4,124		547
2021-09-07	9,118,843	1,519,805	26,684	1,460,754	27,233	2,639	56	5,567		548
2021-09-08	9,146,371	1,522,302	26,736	1,464,594	27,528	2,497	52	3,840		549
2021-09-09	9,175,912	1,524,890	26,794	1,468,211	29,541	2,588	58	3,617		550
2021-09-10	9,202,790	1,527,215	26,832	1,472,067	26,878	2,325	38	3,856		551
2021-09-11	9,221,659	1,528,542	26,880	1,475,235	18,869	1,327	48	3,168		552
2021-09-12	9,246,733	1,530,413	26,931	1,478,821	25,074	1,871	51	3,568		553
2021-09-13	9,272,121	1,532,366	26,972	1,482,933	25,388	1,953	41	4,112		554
2021-09-14	9,303,845	1,534,440	27,007	1,486,668	31,724	2,074	35	3,735		555
2021-09-15	9,332,460	1,536,341	27,058	1,490,541	28,615	1,901	51	3,973		556
2021-09-16	9,363,609	1,538,203	27,109	1,494,090	31,149	1,862	51	3,589		557
2021-09-17	9,393,365	1,540,110	27,147	1,497,009	29,756	1,907	38	2,919		558
2021-09-18	9,413,033	1,541,300	27,182	1,498,654	19,668	1,190	35	1,645		559
2021-09-19	9,437,656	1,542,683	27,225	1,501,541	24,623	1,383	43	2,887		560
2021-09-20	9,465,087	1,544,238	27,251	1,503,106	27,431	1,555	26	1,565		561
2021-09-21	9,498,414	1,545,800	27,277	1,504,709	33,327	1,562	26	1,603		562
2021-09-22	9,527,150	1,547,176	27,313	1,506,136	28,736	1,376	36	1,427		563
2021-09-23	9,551,970	1,548,320	27,337	1,507,789	24,820	1,144	24	1,653		564
2021-09-24	9,579,111	1,549,553	27,368	1,509,202	27,141	1,233	31	1,413		565
2021-09-25	9,596,929	1,550,371	27,393	1,510,167	17,818	818	25	965		566
2021-09-26	9,619,150	1,551,351	27,414	1,511,479	22,221	980	21	1,312		567
2021-09-27	9,646,937	1,552,563	27,439	1,512,681	27,787	1,212	25	1,202		568
2021-09-28	9,676,123	1,553,873	27,470	1,513,876	29,186	1,310	31	1,195		569
2021-09-29	9,704,722	1,555,051	27,487	1,514,962	28,599	1,178	17	1,086		570
2021-09-30	9,731,291	1,555,911	27,510	1,515,941	26,569	860	23	979		571
2021-10-01	9,755,961	1,556,758	27,531	1,516,901	24,670	847	21	960		572
2021-10-02	9,773,244	1,557,347	27,555	1,517,642	17,283	589	24	741		573
2021-10-03	9,774,490	1,557,964	27,573	1,518,754	21,246	617	18	1,012		574
2021-10-04	9,799,418	1,558,758	27,591	1,519,588	24,928	794	18	814		575
2021-10-05	9,824,917	1,559,452	27,614	1,520,296	25,499	694	23	708		576
2021-10-06	9,869,293	1,560,155	27,635	1,521,113	24,376	703	21	817		577
2021-10-07	9,891,614	1,560,818	27,647	1,521,777	22,231	663	12	664		578
2021-10-08	9,914,916	1,561,463	27,654	1,522,591	23,302	645	07	814		579
2021-10-09	9,931,841	1,561,878	27,674	1,523,134	16,925	415	20	543		580
2021-10-10	9,931,841	1,562,840	27,688	1,523,833	20,355	481	19	699		581
2021-10-11	9,975,389	1,562,958	27,699	1,524,467	23,193	599	11	634		582
2021-10-12	9,998,544	1,563,501	27,713	1,525,168	23,155	543	14	701		583
2021-10-13	10,020,697	1,564,019	27,730	1,525,673	22,153	518	17	505		584
2021-10-14	10,042,265	1,564,485	27,737	1,526,368	21,568	466	07	650		585
