= Syed Modasser Ali =

Bangladeshi surgeon and politician

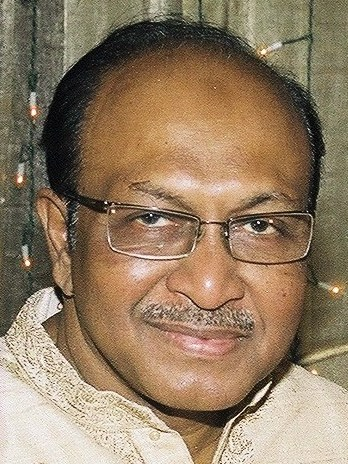
- Syed Modasser Ali
- Born: 1 February 1946 (age 80); Gopalganj, Faridpur district, Bengal Presidency
- Education: Dhaka College; Dhaka Medical College
- Known for: Community ophthalmology
- Medical career
- Profession: Eye Surgeon
- Institutions: Bangladesh Government, WHO, National Institute of Ophthalmology (Bangladesh), Dhaka University
- Sub-specialties: Anterior segment surgery, cataract, public health
- Research: Community ophthalmology
- Awards: World No Tobacco Day Award 2010, BCOS Lifetime Achievement Award 2008

Syed Modasser Ali FRCS, FRCOpth (Bengali: সৈয়দ মোদাচ্ছের আলী) is an ophthalmic surgeon from Bangladesh and was the Health, Family Welfare and Social Welfare adviser to the former Prime Minister of Bangladesh, Sheikh Hasina, from 2009 to 2013. He is the founder of Mojibunnessa Eye Hospital, the first registered eye hospital in Bangladesh and founding editor-in-chief of the Bangladesh Ophthalmic Journal, the first peer-review ophthalmic journal in Bangladesh. He is regarded as one of the pioneers of Community Ophthalmology (public eye health) and his book titled Community Ophthalmology, published in 1985, is considered to be the first textbook on the subject by the British Journal of Ophthalmology. He served three separate terms as a member of the executive board of the World Health Organization (WHO).

In 2013, Ali was named as one of the 20 most innovative surgeons alive by healthcare education website Healthcare-Administration-Degree.net. He is also a recipient of Bangladesh National Personality Research Centre's Freedom Fighter Award for his services during the Bangladesh Liberation War.

== Early life ==
Ali was born in February 1946 to a Bengali family in Gopalganj, then part of the Faridpur district of the Bengal Province.

== Career ==
Ali was the Health and Family Welfare and Social Welfare adviser to the Bangladeshi prime minister, from 2009 to 2013, with the full rank and status of a senior cabinet minister. He was one of seven advisers (one of only five with a portfolio) to the government, providing the prime minister and the cabinet advise on various national and international issues. He was also a member of the executive committee of the National Economic Council, the highest political authority for consideration of development projects in Bangladesh, during this time. He oversaw the development and running of the Bangladesh Community Clinic programme as chair of the board of trustees from 2010 to 2024.

He was the Director-General of Health Services for the Bangladesh government in 2001, Dean of the Faculty of Postgraduate Medicine and Research at Dhaka University from 1998 to 2001, chairman of the Bangladesh Medical Research Council (BMRC) from 1998 to 2003 and 2017 to 2024, director (and professor emeritus) of the National Institute of Ophthalmology in Dhaka, Bangladesh from 1997 to 2001, and chairman of the governing body of Dhaka City College, one of the oldest colleges in Bangladesh, from 2015 to 2024.. Under his chairmanship BMRC was awarded the prestigious WHO 50th Anniversary Primary Healthcare Development Award in 1998. He was also the president of the Ophthalmic Society of Bangladesh and in January 2015 the first peer-reviewed ophthalmic journal in Bangladesh, the Bangladesh Ophthalmic Journal, was launched with Ali as the founding editor-in-chief.

Ali has been a lifelong anti-smoking campaigner and played a central role in the banning of smoking in public places in his home country of Bangladesh where nearly 50% of adults use tobacco for recreational purposes. In his capacity as the health and family welfare adviser to the prime minister of Bangladesh, he oversaw changes in legislation to fully comply with the provisions of the WHO Framework Convention on Tobacco Control and was awarded the WHO World No Tobacco Day Award 2010 for his work on tobacco control. He was also the vice-president of the WHO Framework Convention on Tobacco Control (FCTC) representing the WHO South-East Asia Region from 2010 to 2012.

== Political life ==
While studying for his medical degree at Dhaka Medical College, Ali was elected as the vice-president of Bangladesh Chhatra League, the student wing of Bangladesh Awami League. However, since then he has terminated any official affiliation with the Awami League, but has been the personal physician of the current Awami League president, Sheikh Hasina. He was active in negotiations with the military-backed Bangladesh caretaker government regarding sending Hasina, who was detained on corruption charges, abroad for treatment, and threatened to sue the government over negligence regarding Hasina's treatment during her detention in 2008. He also served as a government adviser to Sheikh Hasina during her time as the Prime Minister of Bangladesh and was involved in the formulation of the prime minister's peace model presented at the 66th session of the United Nations General Assembly.

== Books ==
Ali has authored several books on community ophthalmology and politics.

- Community Ophthalmology, Anamoy Publishers 1985, OCLC 794112476
- Shontrasher Majhe Boshobash (Living within terrorism), Anannya 1993, ISBN 984-412-007-1
- Shat Dashoker Chhatra Rajniti (60s' student politics), National Publication 2003

== Personal life ==
He is married and has three children.

== Hallmark Group controversy ==
On 29 August 2012, the Anti Corruption Commission of Bangladesh said they had information that Ali allegedly influenced Sonali Bank authorities into granting a fraudulent loan to the controversial Hallmark Group, an allegation that he denied. No charges were brought against Ali following an investigation by a specially convened parliamentary committee.
