= Golam Moula =

Pakistani-Bengali medical doctor and politician

- গোলাম মওলা

Member of the National Assembly of Pakistan
- In office 1965–1969
- President: Ayub Khan
- Constituency: NE-36 (Faridpur-VI)

Personal details
- Born: 20 October 1920 Poragachha, Naria, Faridpur district, Bengal
- Died: 29 May 1967 (aged 46) East Pakistan
- Education: Dhaka Medical College; Calcutta Medical College; University of Dacca; University of Calcutta; Jagannath College

Golam Moula (Bengali: গোলাম মওলা; 20 October 1920 – 29 May 1967) was a Pakistani-Bengali medical doctor, politician, and political organizer. He was elected a member of the East Pakistan Legislative Assembly in the by-elections of 1956 and a member of the National Assembly of Pakistan in 1962. At that time he was the whip of the opposition in the Pakistan National Assembly.

== Early life and education ==
Golam Moula was born on 20 October 1920 to a Bengali Muslim family in the village of Poragachha in Naria, then a part of the Faridpur district of colonial Bengal (now Shariatpur District, Bangladesh). His parents were Alhaj Abdul Ghafur Dhali and Chhutu Bibi. His education began at the Pachukhar Kandi Primary School in Jazira. He matriculated from the Naria Bihari Lal High School in 1939, passed ISC from Jagannath College, Dacca, in 1941, and BSc in 1943.

He passed the first phase of an MSc in geology from the University of Calcutta and an MSc from the University of Dacca. Later in 1948, he was admitted to Calcutta Medical College for the MBBS course. After the Partition of Bengal in 1947, he enrolled in the second year MBBS course at Dhaka Medical College and obtained the MBBS degree there in 1954.

== Career ==
Mowla was the commander of the Mukul Fauj in Calcutta while studying. In 1952 he was the vice-president of the Student Parliament of Dhaka Medical College and the vice-president of the East Pakistan Chhatra League.

Mowla played a strong role in the Bengali language movement of 1952. He was a member of the All-Party Rastrabhasa Sangram Parishad, formed on 31 January of that year at the Dhaka Bar Library under the chairmanship of Maulana Abdul Hamid Khan Bhashani. At that time, he was the convener of the Rashtrabhasha Sangram Parishad of Dhaka Medical College. Golam Mawla played a special role in the decision to observe Rashtrabhasha Day through hartal on 21 February and Flag Day on 21 and 23 February at the meeting of the All-Party Rashtrabhasha Sangram Parishad held at the office of Mughaltulistha, East Bengal, on 15 February 1952.

From 20 February 1952, the government issued section 144 for one month and banned rallies and processions. Immediately after this announcement, the medical students, led by Golam Mawla, came together and immediately decided to break section 144 and continue the movement. After the shooting of the student procession on 21 February, most of the leaders of the movement met at the Engineering College, Dhaka at night to decide the strategy of the movement. When the Student Struggle Committee was newly formed at this meeting, Mowla was elected the convener of the committee.

The first Shaheed Minar was built on the night of 23 February under the overall supervision of Mowla at the site of the first shooting at the Medical College Hostel premises.

At the end of his student life, Mowla engaged in the medical profession in Madaripur. At this time he joined the Awami Muslim League. He was the president of the Madaripur subdivision unit of the Awami League. He was elected a member of the East Pakistan Legislative Assembly in the by-elections of 1956 and a member and opposition whip of the National Assembly of Pakistan in 1962.

== Death and legacy ==
Mowla died on 29 May 1967. The bridge over the Naria Kirtinasha river has been renamed Dr. Golam Mowla Bridge in memory of Mowla and Dhanmondi Road No. 1 in Dhaka was renamed Dr. Golam Mowla Road.

In 2010, he was awarded the Ekushey Padak for his contribution to the Bengali language movement.
