= Ahsan Ali (physician) =

Bangladeshi physician (1937–2019)

A. K. Md. Ahsan Ali
- এ. কে. মোঃ আহসান আলী
- Born: 1 May 1937; Brahmanbaria district, Bengal Presidency, British India
- Died: 10 September 2019 (aged 82); Dhaka, Bangladesh
- Education: Dhaka College, Dhaka Medical College, Royal College of Physicians of Ireland
- Awards: Independence Day Award (2018)

A. K. Md. Ahsan Ali (known as Ahsan Ali; 1 May 1937 – 10 September 2019) was a Bangladeshi physician. He was notable for the integration of tuberculosis and leprosy with general health services and the introduction of Directly observed treatment, short-course (DOTS) for treatment of tuberculosis and MDT for leprosy. He received the Independence Day Award from the Government of Bangladesh in 2018.

== Early life and education ==
Ali was born at Rupasdi village in Brahmanbaria District. He passed matriculation in 1952 from Rupasdi Brindabon High School and I.Sc. from Dhaka College in 1954. He obtained MBBS from Dhaka Medical College in 1961. He had DTCD from UK in 1965 and higher training in general medicine in 1966. He completed special training on TB management in 1976 and higher training on TB in 1980 from Japan. He received FCCP degree in 1984 and FWAIM Fellowship in 2002 from the United States. He achieved FRCPI from the Royal College of Physicians of Ireland in 2007 and PhD in integrated medicine in 2010 from the United States.

== Career ==
Ali worked at the Dhaka Medical College as an associate professor of TB and Chest Diseases during 1966–1980. In 1980, he joined the National Institute of Diseases of the Chest and Hospital (NIDCH). He acted as the director of the institute several times. He was the first Bangladeshi to be appointed a member of the governing body of SAARC TB Centre in Nepal and later became the Chairman of the institute.

== Death ==
Ali died on 10 September 2019 at the age of 82.
