= Nawab Ali =

Bangladeshi physician and academic (1902-1977)

- নওয়াব আলী
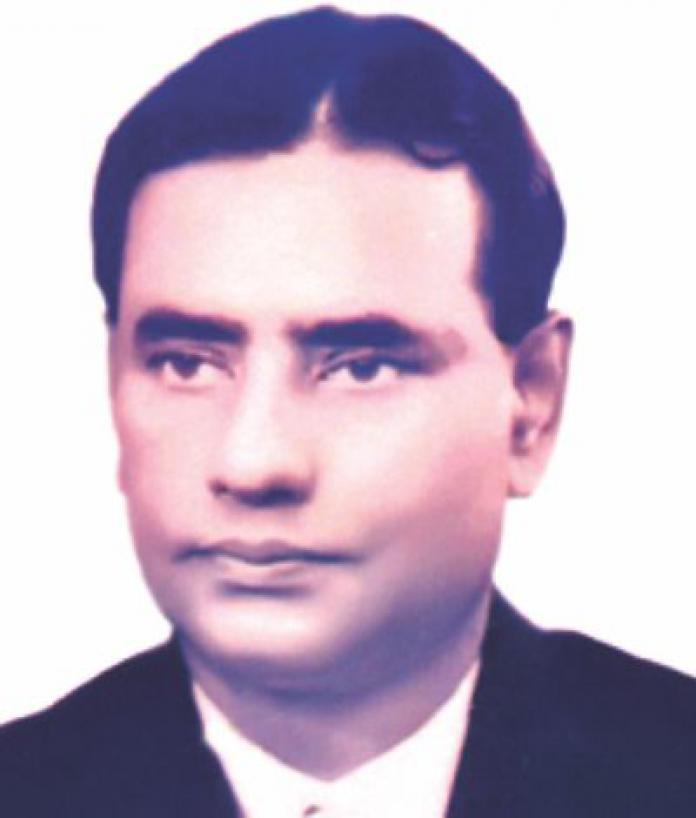

Principal

Dhaka Medical College
- In office 1953 - 1954
- Preceded by: Colonel M. K. Afridi
- Succeeded by: A. K. M. A. Wahed
- In office 1955 - 1957
- Preceded by: A. K. M. A. Wahed
- Succeeded by: Md. Refat Ullah

Personal details
- Born: 1902 Matlab North, Chandpur, British India
- Died: 4 August 1977 (aged 74–75)
- Education: Calcutta Medical College

Nawab Ali (1902–1977) was a Bangladeshi physician and academic. He was an elected member of East Pakistan provincial assembly. He was also principal of Dhaka Medical College.

== Early life and education ==
He was born at Matlab Uttar of Chandpur in the then undivided India (now in Bangladesh) in 1902.

Ali passed entrance exam from Munshiganj High School and HSC from Dhaka College. He passed MBBS from Calcutta Medical College in 1927. In 1935, he earned a diploma in tropical medicine from the School of Tropical Medicine, Calcutta. The government sent him to the U.K. in 1945 for higher studies. There he obtained his MRCP (Edinburgh) before returning to India in 1946.

Ali was a renowned professor of medicine who served as the head of the department of medicine and principal of Dhaka Medical College. He was also the dean of the faculty of medicine of University of Dhaka. He was the president of the organization that was then known as the All Pakistan Medical Association. He received FRCP in 1958. He founded a diarrhoeal disease hospital under ICDDR,B at Matlab.

He was elected as a member of East Pakistan legislative assembly in 1962.

== Death ==
Ali died on August 4, 1977, in Dhaka.

== Honors ==
The Jatiya Sangsad passed an obituary reference on him in 2003. The postal department issued a first-day cover and stamp in his honour in 2005.
