= Topkhana Road =

Road in Dhaka, Bangladesh

- Namesake: Cannon
- Type: Street
- Maintained by: Dhaka South City Corporation
- Length: 1 km (0.62 mi)
- Location: Dhaka
- West end: Maulana Bhasani Road, National Eidgah Street
- East end: DIT Avenue, Motijheel Avenue

Topkhana Road is a road spanning across Segunbagicha and Paltan areas of Dhaka, Bangladesh. It is a major road that houses many important government buildings. The road starts at the Foreign Ministry intersection at Segunbagicha and ends in the Doinik Bangla Intersection.

== Landmarks ==
- Ministry of Foreign Affairs, Segunbagicha
- National Press Club, Segunbagicha
- Bangladesh Secretariat metro station, Segunbagicha
- Bangladesh Press Council, Segunbagicha
- Ministry of Land, Bangladesh Secretariat, Segunbagicha
- Ministry of Social Welfare, Bangladesh Secretariat, Segunbagicha
- Bangladesh Medical Association, Segunbagicha
- Ministry of Agriculture, Bangladesh Secretariat, Segunbagicha
- Baitul Mukarram, Paltan
- National Sports Council, Paltan
- Bangladesh House Building Finance Corporation, Paltan
- CIRDAP, Segunbagicha
