= Subhagata Choudhury =

Bangladeshi science writer (1947–2025)

- শুভাগত চৌধুরী
- Born: 1947; Sylhet, Assam Province, British India
- Died: 15 January 2025 (aged 78); Dhaka, Bangladesh
- Relatives: Arup Ratan Choudhury (brother)

Subhagata Choudhury (1947 – 15 January 2025) was a Bangladeshi health science writer and Professor of Medical Biochemistry. He was awarded Bangla Academy Literary Award in 2021 in science, science fiction or environmental science category and Sher-e-Bangla National Award. He wrote 62 books in Bengali and more than 50 articles in medical journals focusing on biochemistry, nutrition, and medical education.

== Life and career ==
Dr Choudhury completed his research on health care at St Thomas' Hospital in London. He served as the principal of Chittagong Medical College and the dean of the Faculty of Medicine at University of Chittagong. He was the director of laboratory services at BIRDEM in Dhaka. He was an advisor to the Association of Nutritionists and Dieticians for Social Services (ANDSS). He was an elected fellow of the New York Academy of Sciences.

Choudhury had two daughters and one son, and a brother, Arup Ratan Choudhury. Subhagata Choudhury died from cancer at the Ibrahim Cardiac Hospital and Research Institute in Dhaka, on 15 January 2025, at the age of 78.
