= Badrul Alam =

Bangladeshi physician and language activist

- Born: 1929
- Died: 10 December 1980 (aged 50–51)
- Education: Dhaka Medical College
- Awards: Ekushey Padak (2014)

Badrul Alam (1929 – 10 December 1980) was a Bangladeshi language activist, physician and medical academic. He designed the first Shaheed Minar. He was conferred with Ekushey Padak posthumously in 2014 for his contribution to the Language Movement.

== Biography ==
Alam was born in 1929 in Sherpur to Nasir Uddin Ahmad and Tohurunnesa. His ancestors' house is situated in Sonargaon, Narayanganj. He completed matriculation from Mymensingh Zilla School. Later, he completed higher secondary studies from Haraganga College, Munsiganj. Then, he was admitted into Dhaka Medical College and received MBBS degree from there in 1956. Alam took part in the Language Movement. He designed the first Shaheed Minar.

Alam applied for a job at Dhaka Medical College after passing MBBS but was unsuccessful, as there was no vacancy. Then, he went to West Pakistan and started work at a hospital in Adowal. Later, he quit the job and joined a medical college of Peshawar as a lecturer of anatomy department in 1957. After that he went to the United Kingdom for higher studies in 1961. He returned to his own country in 1967.

Alam joined Sir Salimullah Medical College as an assistant professor after passing Pakistan Civil Service examination in 1970. 10 years later he was transferred to Dhaka Medical College.

Alam died on 10 December 1980. After his death he was conferred with Ekushey Padak posthumously in 2014 for his contribution to the Language Movement.
