= Dhaka Medical College Hospital =

Medical College and Hospital in Dhaka, Bangladesh

Dhaka Medical College
- ঢাকা মেডিকেল কলেজ
- Emblem of Dhaka Medical College
- Other name: DMCH
- Type: Public Medical College & Hospital
- Established: 1946; 80 years ago
- Academic affiliations: University of Dhaka; Bangladesh Medical University
- Principal: Md Kamrul Alam
- Director of Hospital: Brig. Gen. AKM Farhad Hossain
- Location: Secretariat Road, Shahbagh, Dhaka, Bangladesh; 23.7257°N 90.3971°E
- Campus: Urban, 85 acres (34 ha)
- Language: English
- Website: dmc.gov.bd; dmch.gov.bd

Dhaka Medical College Hospital (DMCH) is a public medical college and hospital located in Dhaka, Bangladesh. Established in 1946, the college houses a medical school as well as a tertiary care hospital on its campus.

== History ==
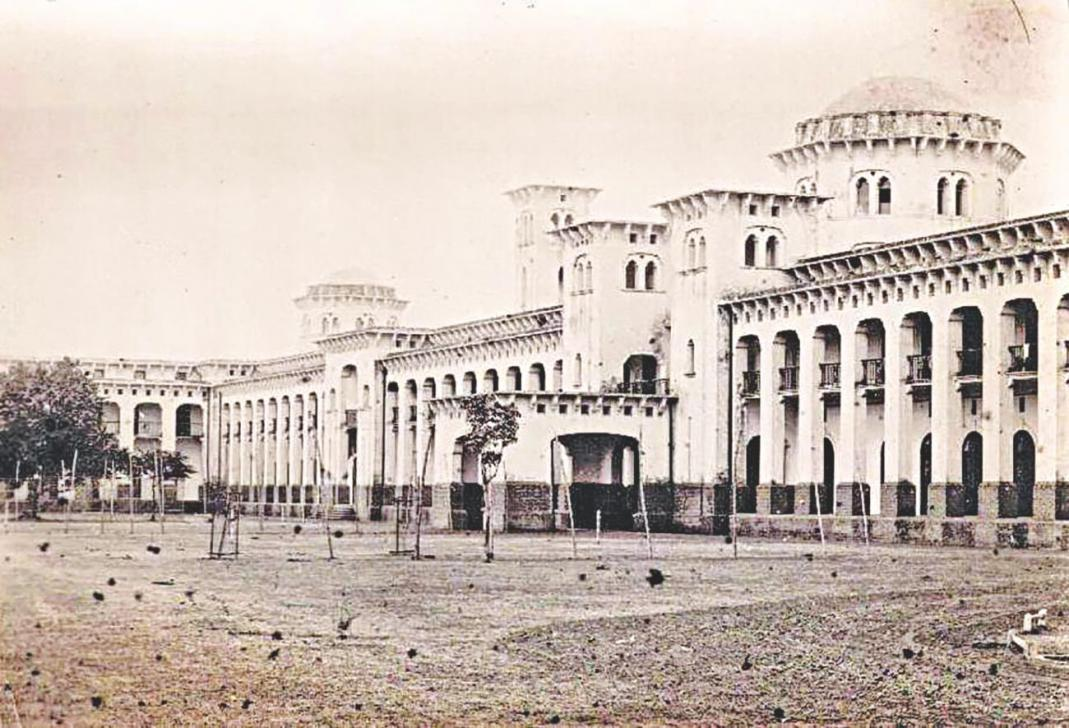
Dhaka Medical College and Hospital in 1940s

=== Site during pre-college years ===
The college's original building was built prior to the Partition of Bengal of 1905. In 1904, the building was being used as the secretariat (headquarters) of the newly formed provinces of East Bengal and Assam.

In 1921, it was turned over to the University of Dhaka, which was founded that year. Part of the building was used as the university's medical center, another as the students' dormitory, and the rest as the office of the administrative wing of the Arts faculty.

In 1939, the Dhaka University Council requested the British government to establish a separate medical college in Dhaka. The proposal was postponed because of the onset of the Second World War.

During World War II, the medical center building became an American armed forces hospital. The Americans vacated the building at the end of the war.

=== Establishment of the college ===
In 1946, due to the partition of India, all the advanced students (from K-4 to K-1) as well as many lecturers and professors were transferred from Calcutta Medical College to start academic studies and maintain hospital facilities in the newly established Dhaka Medical College. Classes started in the college on 10 July, which is celebrated as DMC Day.

Major William John Virgin, the head of the committee formed to establish the Dhaka Medical College, was the first principal. In the beginning, there were only four departments: medicine, surgery, gynecology and otolaryngology (ENT).

Since the college did not initially have anatomy or physiology departments, the students at first attended those classes at Mitford Medical School (now the Sir Salimullah Medical College), also in Dhaka; but after a month, Professor of Anatomy Pashupati Basu and Professor of Physiology Hiralal Saha joined the staff, and their specialties were taught in ward no. 22 of the hospital.

=== Expansion ===
After the construction of new academic buildings in 1955, a lecture hall and a dissection gallery were built in the college. The college and hospital premises were expanded with temporary sheds, some of which were built for outdoor services of the hospital and some for student housing. New buildings for housing, college, and hospital were constructed in phases: a dormitory for girls in 1952, a dormitory for male students in 1954–55, a new complex of academic buildings in 1955, and a dormitory for internee doctors in 1974–75. The new academic and hospital building, Dhaka Medical College Hospital-2, was inaugurated by Prime Minister Sheikh Hasina on 3 October 2013. The country's first ever autologous bone marrow transplant took place in its bone marrow transplant unit.

=== Origin of 'K' ===
Every student batch, or class, of Dhaka Medical College is tagged with the prefix K along with a number. The first year, the beginning batch of the college, was named K-1, likewise the second year as K-2, the third year as K-3, the fourth year as K-4, and the fifth year as K-5. In 2020, DMC hosted its 77th batch, hence branded as K-77. Many theories exist about the origin of the letter K, the most popular being that K stands for Kolkata, as many students of DMC's earlier batches migrated from Calcutta Medical College. Although Kolkata was officially known as Calcutta until 2001, the city was widely pronounced as Kolkata/Kolikata in Bengali. Though the first ten medical schools did not follow this tradition, yet another theory proposes that, as the institute was the 11th medical school in the Indian subcontinent, K, the 11th letter of the English alphabet, is used to represent that.

== Undergraduate course ==
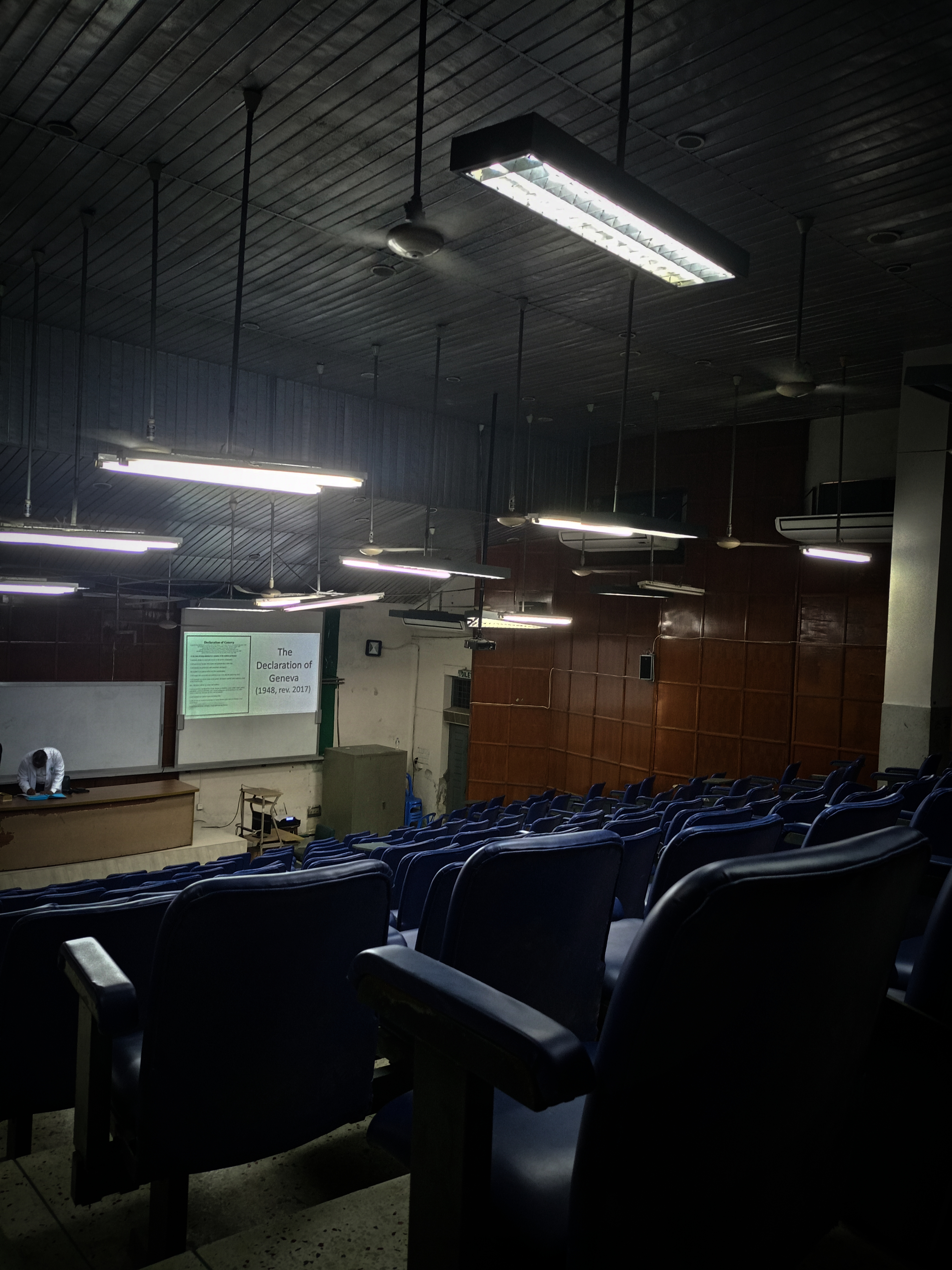
Lecture Gallery 2, commonly said LG2; after the end of a lecture of undergraduate 3rd year (K-80 batch)

A countrywide combined medical admission test for the MBBS course is held every year under the supervision of DGHS. 139,217 eligible students sat for the entrance exams in 2023. Students after passing Higher Secondary School Certificate or equivalent examinations with the required grades can apply for the admission test. In 2023, a total of 230 seats, 226 general seats and 4 seats for the freedom fighter quota, were allocated for the MBBS course in Dhaka Medical College.

The qualified candidates, according to their preferences, get the opportunity to study at Dhaka Medical College. Foreign candidates from both SAARC and non-SAARC countries are selected by DGHS and MOHFW as per required qualifications.

The college runs a 5-year MBBS course according to the curriculum developed by BMDC. A student studies anatomy, physiology, biochemistry, pathology, pharmacology, microbiology, forensic medicine, community medicine, medicine & allied subjects, surgery & allied subjects and gynecology and obstetrics during the course period.

The course is divided into 4 phases. Four professional examinations, one at the end of each phase, are held under the University of Dhaka. After passing the fourth or final professional examination, a student is awarded an MBBS degree. Course curriculum follows percentage system grading. Pass mark for the college's internal as well as professional examinations is 60 percent. Students shall have to pass written (MCQ + SAQ + formative), oral, practical and clinical examinations separately.

== Postgraduate courses ==
The college offers MD, MS, Diploma, MPhil in 50 different subjects in affiliation with University of Dhaka and Bangabandhu Sheikh Mujib Medical University.

The college also runs fellowship courses of the Bangladesh College of Physicians and Surgeons in different disciplines.

== Principals ==
List of the Principals of DMCH
Name	Duration in office		Ref.
Name	From	To	Ref.
Major William John Virgin	1 July 1946	14 August 1947	
Lt. Col. Edward George Montgomery	15 August 1947	19 April 1948	
T. Ahmed	19 April 1948	12.31.1952	
Colonel Monowar Khan Afridi	12.31.1952	20 March 1953	
Nawab Ali	21 March 1953	10 April 1954	
A. K. M. Abdul Wahed	11 April 1954	20 January 1955	
Nawab Ali	21 January 1955	1 February 1957	
Md. Refat Ullah	1 February 1957	1 September 1958	
Habib Uddin Ahmed	2 September 1958	4 June 1959	
Lt. Col. M. M. Haque	4 June 1959	11 September 1963	
A. K. S. Ahmed	11 September 1963	28 December 1963	
G. Kibria	28 December 1963	8 February 1964	
Lt. Col. Borhanuddin	9 February 1964	27 January 1969	
K. A. Khaleque	27 January 1969	30 December 1970	
Saifullah	1 January 1971	20 May 1971	
M. R. Chowdhury	25 May 1971	2 July 1974	
M. A. Jalil	3 July 1974	6 May 1976	
M. A. Kashem	7 May 1976	1 October 1978	
Md. Shahidullah	2 October 1978	25 November 1980	
Mazharul Imam	25 November 1980	1 October 1981	
M. A. Mazed	1 October 1981	2 July 1982	
M. I. Chowdhury	2 July 1982	31 January 1985	
Mirza Mazharul Islam	31 January 1985	13 December 1986	
Waliullah	13 December 1986	30 January 1990	
M. Kabiruddin Ahmed	31 January 1990	30 March 1991	
Zwahurul Moula Chaudhury	30 March 1991	14 January 1995	
Md. Shofiullah	14 January 1995	22 January 1995	
M. A. Hadi	22 January 1995	18 July 1996	
A. B. M. Ahsan Ullah	18 July 1996	19 September 1999	
A. K. Md. Shahidul Islam	19 September 1999	29 August 2001	
Md. Abdul Kadir Khan	29 August 2001	15 November 2001	
Tofayel Ahmed	15 November 2001	7 August 2003	
Md. Fazlul Haque	7 August 2003	29 September 2003	
Hosne Ara Tahmin (Charu)	29 September 2003	26 June 2006	
Syed Mahbubul Alam	26 June 2006	1 March 2007	
M. Abul Faiz	1 March 2007	7 January 2008	
Quazi Deen Mohammad	17 January 2008	9 January 2014	
Md. Ismail Khan	9 January 2014	13 May 2017	
Md. Shafiqul Alam Chowdhury (Acting)	13 May 2017	13 June 2017	
Khan Abul Kalam Azad	13 June 2017	31 December 2020	
Md. Titu Miah	1 January 2021	4 January 2023	
Md. Shafiqul Alam Chowdhury	5 January 2023	August 2024	
Md. Kamrul Alam		Present	

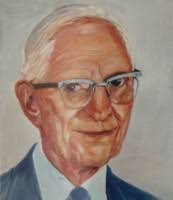
Major William John Virgin, first principal of DMC

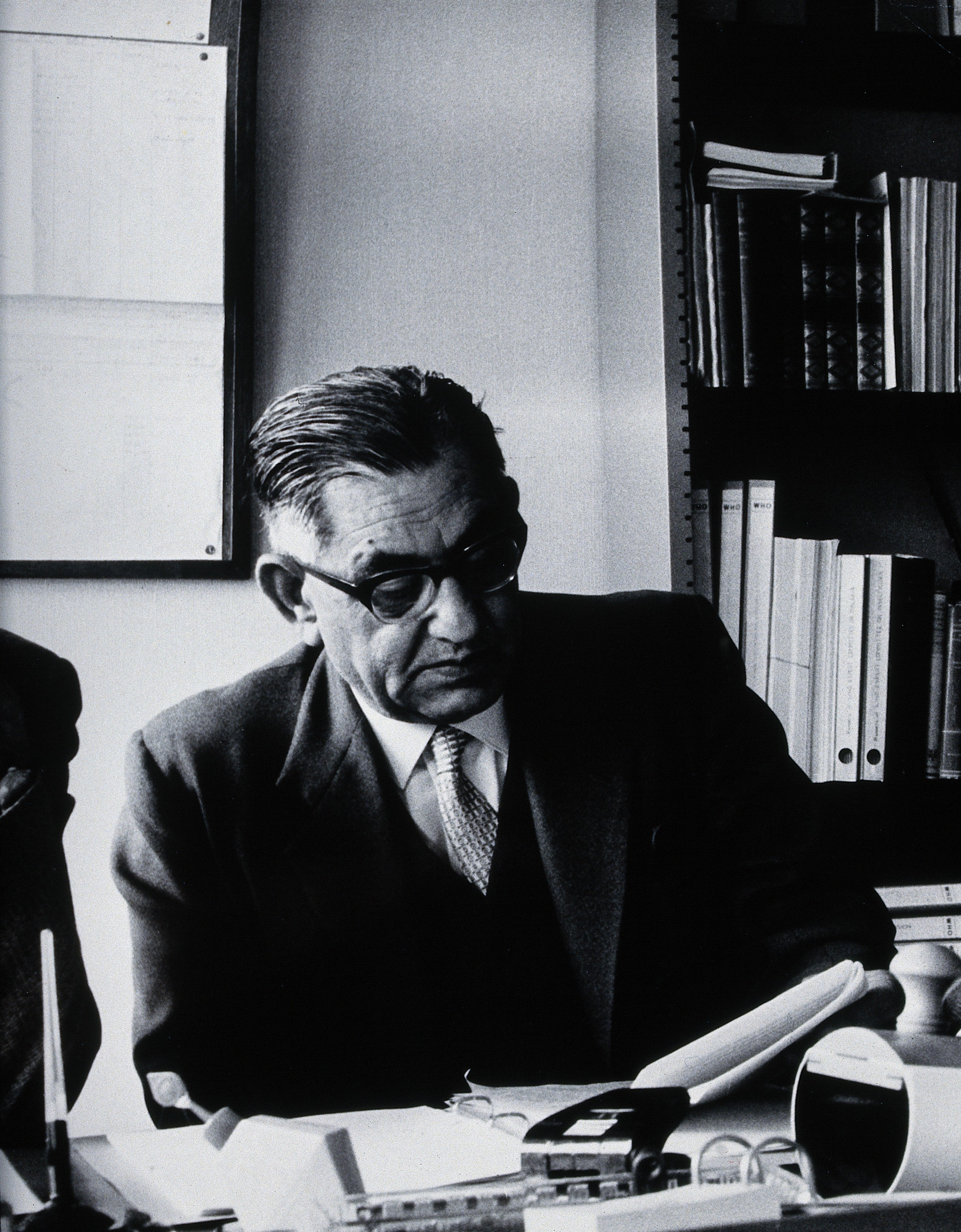
Colonel Monowar Khan Afridi, malariologist

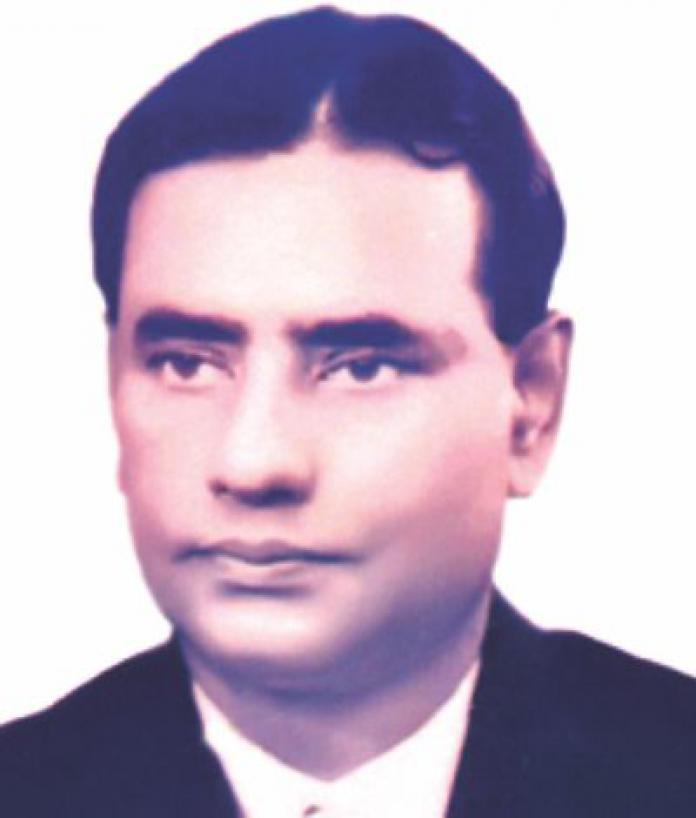
Nawab Ali, served as the college principal twice

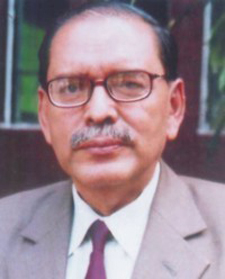
M. A. Hadi, 28th principal of DMCH

== Hospital wing ==
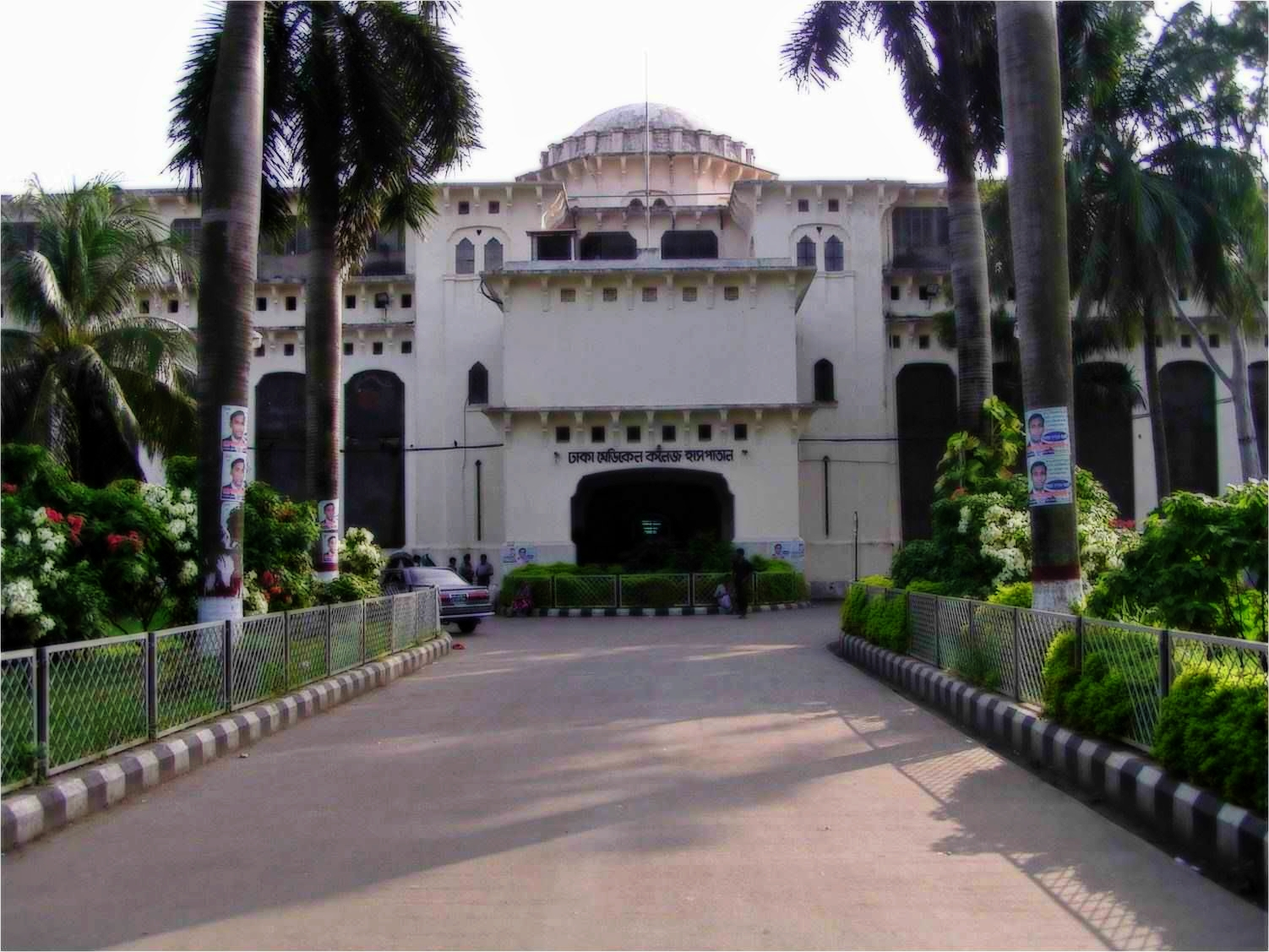
Dhaka Medical College Hospital Main Entrance

=== Facilities and services ===
Dhaka Medical College has a 2600-bed teaching hospital as Dhaka Medical College Hospital (DMCH) within the same compound, with 92 wards. It is a tertiary referral hospital. It has a 300-bed facility dedicated for burn and plastic surgery. It was the largest burn unit of the country until Sheikh Hasina National Institute of Burn and Plastic Surgery was set.

With over 500 admissions per day, 1300 emergency visits per day and 5000 patients at OPD per day at the hospital, it has an occupancy rate of 133%. It also includes about 50 Operation Theatres that perform about 50,000 major operations and about 35,000 minor operations per year.

In 2015, the Hospital's Out-Patient Department provided services to 799,896 patients. More 346,580 patients attended at the emergency and 149,122 patients got admitted in different facilities of the hospital in 2015. The surgical staffs performed 58,355 surgeries in 2015. Expansion plan to turn the hospital into a 5000-bed facility has been contemplated.

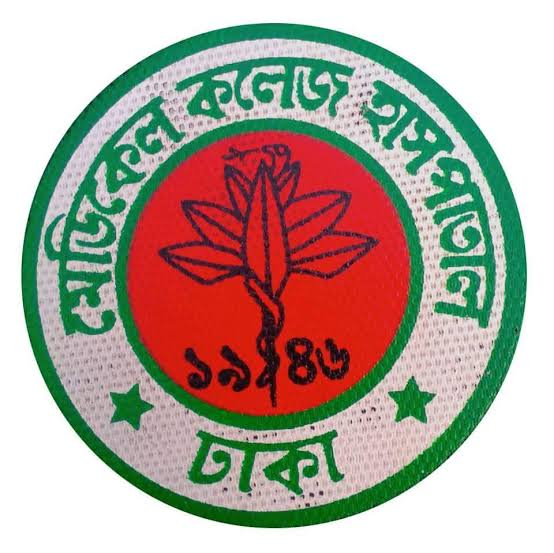
Emblem used by Dhaka Medical College Hospital

The country's first bone marrow transplant center was set in this hospital in October 2013 in collaboration with Massachusetts General Hospital. This unit conducted first ever successful autologous bone marrow transplant in the country in March 2014. The unit also introduced allogeneic bone marrow transplant on 3 July 2019, the first in the country.

=== Clinical teaching ===
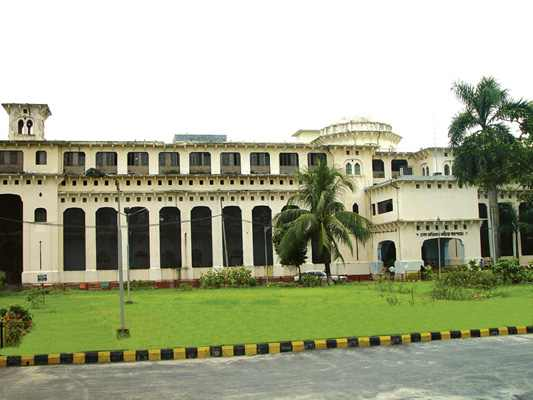
Hospital building

It is one of the major teaching hospitals in the country. Bedside teaching and clinical examinations of the undergraduate as well as postgraduate students take place at the hospital wing.

Dhaka Medical College Hospital is a recognized clinical examination centre for fellowship examination of Bangladesh College of Physicians and Surgeons.

=== Hospital administration ===
Director of the hospital is the administrative chief of the hospital service. Deputy director, assistant directors and other officials give him assistance in this regard. Faculties from different departments of the college act as clinical and administrative superiors of the respective department. They actively supervise the clinical services as well as clinical training of the trainee doctors.

== Student life ==
=== Students' accommodation ===
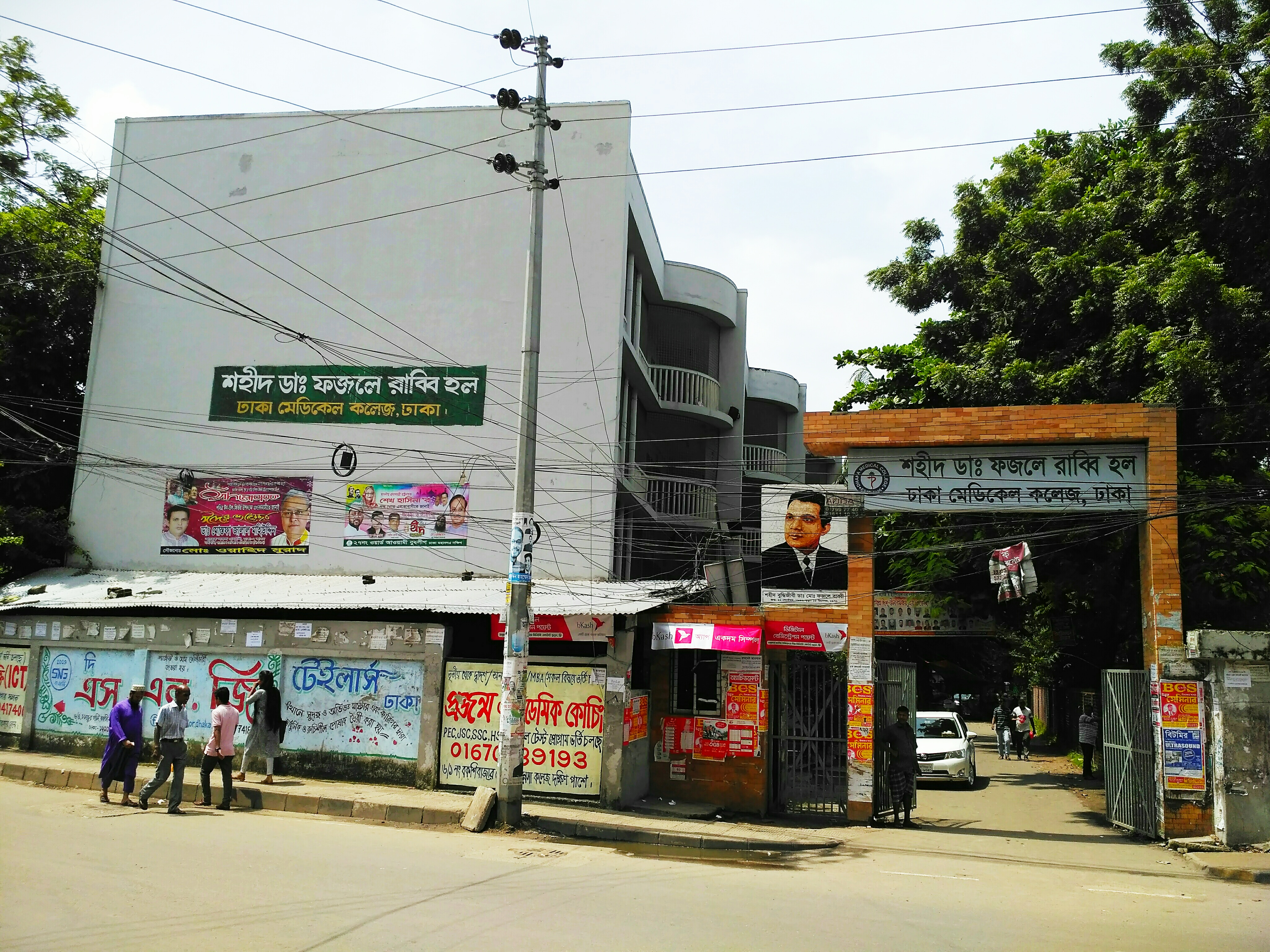
Entrance of Shaheed Dr. Fazle Rabbee Hall at Bakshibazar, Lalbagh, Dhaka

In the past, Ramesh Chandra Majumdar, the then vice chancellor of University of Dhaka, arranged accommodation for the medical college students. Muslim students were accommodated in Salimullah Muslim Hall, Hindus were accommodated in the then Dhaka Hall (now Dr. Muhammad Shahidullah Hall). Baptist mission hostel at Sadarghat accommodated the Christian students. Nursing Hostel was allocated for the female students. Later, 20 medical barracks were built and students were accommodated there. As of 2019, there are four hostels for accommodation of the students as well as interns.

- Shaheed Dr. Fazle Rabbee Hall (established in 1955) - For male students (named after martyred intellectual Mohammed Fazle Rabbee)
- Dr. Alim Chowdhury Hall - For female students (named after martyred intellectual AFM Alim Chowdhury)
- Shaheed Dr. Shamsul Alam Khan Milon Intern Doctors' hostel (Male) (named after the martyred activist of anti-autocracy movement in 1990, Shamsul Alam Khan Milon)
- Shaheed Dr. Shamsul Alam Khan Milon Intern Doctors' Hostel (Female)

Dr. Fazle Rabbee Hall and Dr. Milon Intern Doctors' hostel (for male) share the same compound at Bakshibazar, Lalbagh, Dhaka. Dr. Alim Chowdhury hall and Dr. Milon Intern doctors' hostel (for female) share the same compound inside the territory of the college.

=== Sports facility ===
DMC has a sports ground inside Fazle Rabbee Hall. It is used for football, cricket, and other athletics. Fazle Rabbee Hall also houses a basketball ground and a tennis ground. Besides, college building and hostels have students' common rooms with indoor game facility

=== Cultural activities ===
College has an auditorium with 1200 sitting capacity. DMC day is celebrated each year on 10 July, the foundation day of the college.

== Role in national politics ==
=== Bengali Language Movement (1948-1952) ===
The college dormitories that were known as barracks were at the heart of the Bengali language movement from 1948 to 1952. The barracks were formerly situated at the current location of the Shaheed Minar.

There were about 20 tin shed barracks where the medical students resided. Because they were close to the Parliament of East Pakistan (presently Jagannath Hall of Dhaka University), the medical dormitories were chosen as the center of the student movement.

In the early hours of 21 February 1952, all the students of Dhaka Medical College gathered in front of the medical college dormitories. In the afternoon the group headed for the parliament which was in session. No procession was allowed due to the imposition of Section 144 (a section of the penal code that prohibited unlawful assembly). The students decided to defy Section 144 at 4:00 PM at the historic Aam-tola (which was situated beside the present day Emergency gate).

The police fired at the procession, resulting in the deaths of Salam, Barkat, Rafique, Jabbar and Shafiur. After sunset on 21 February, at the site of the deaths, the students of Dhaka Medical College decided to build a monument. Badrul Alam and Sayed Haider the then students of Dhaka Medical College planned and designed the structure. They worked continuously on 22 and 23 February and finished the construction, using bricks, gravel and cement reserved for the hospital. A paper with Shaheed Smritistambha written on it was attached on the monument. It was inaugurated by the father of Shofiur Rahman, a martyr of language movement. However, the monument was demolished by government forces on 26 February 1952.

=== Independence War (1971) ===
Many staff and students took part in the 1971 Bangladesh War of Independence, as fighters or in treating the injured. DMC's doctors, teachers and students laid their lives in the war. Many eminent physicians and academics were abducted from home and killed during the war.

== Notable alumni ==
- Rashiduddin Ahmad, neurosurgeon
- Badrul Alam, activist in the Bengali language movement, designer of first Shaheed Minar, Ekushey Padak awardee (2014)
- A K M Ahsan Ali, pulmonologist, pioneer of the DOTS method of treating tuberculosis, awardee of Independence Day Award in 2018
- Syed Modasser Ali, former health advisor to Prime Minister Sheikh Hasina
- M Iqbal Arslan, President of Swadhinata Chikitshak Parishad
- Kanak Kanti Barua, neurosurgeon, vice-chancellor of BSMMU
- Sitara Begum, doctor and army officer awarded the Bir Protik
- AFM Alim Chowdhury, ophthalmologist, intellectual killed during the Bangladesh Liberation War
- AHM Touhidul Anowar Chowdhury, obstetrician/gynecologist, awardee of Independence Day Award in 2017
- A. Q. M. Badruddoza Chowdhury, former President of Bangladesh, Independence Day Award awardee in 1993
- Meerjady Sabrina Flora, epidemiologist, former Director of IEDCR
- Sayed Haider, activist in the Bengali language movement, designer of Shaheed Minar, Ekushey Padak awardee (2016)
- A F M Ruhul Haque, former Health and Family Welfare Minister, orthopedic surgeon, former President of Swadhinata Chikitshak Parishad
- AKM Fazlul Haque, pioneer colorectal surgeon
- Mirza Mazharul Islam, surgeon, language movement veteran, Ekushey Padak awardee (2018)
- Shahla Khatun, National Professor award winner, obstetrician/gynecologist
- Abdul Malik, cardiologist, National Professor award winner, founder of National Heart Foundation, and National Institute of Cardiovascular Diseases, awarded Independence Day Award (2004)
- Shamsul Alam Khan Milon, activist killed during the 1990 Mass Uprising in Bangladesh
- Quazi Deen Mohammad, neurologist, Founding director of NINS, President of Bangladesh College of Physicians and Surgeons
- Mostofa Jalal Mohiuddin, President of Bangladesh Medical Association, former President of Bangladesh Chhatra League
- Dipu Moni, Education Minister, former Minister of Foreign Affairs
- Golam Moula, activist in the Bengali language movement, Eksushey Padak awardee (2010) (posthumous)
- Mohammed Fazle Rabbee, cardiologist, intellectual killed during the Bangladesh War of Independence
- Ahmed Rafiq, activist in the Bengali language movement, writer, researcher, Ekushey Padak awardee (1995)
- Lutfor Rahman, cardiac surgeon

== See also ==
- List of medical colleges in Bangladesh
- Sir Salimullah Medical College
