= Addowal =

Adowal
- Town and union council
- Interactive map of Adowal
- Country: Pakistan
- Region: Punjab
- District: Gujrat
- Time zone: UTC+5 (PST)

Adowal Gujrat is a town and union council of Gujrat District in the Punjab province of Pakistan. It is located at 32°34'56"N 74°02'50"E and lies outside the district capital, Gujrat. It is bordered by the Grand Trunk Road on one side and touches Gujranwala Bypass on the other. Addowal is one of the larger towns in Gujrat in terms of both population and area.
