= William John Virgin =

Indian Medical Service Officer & Founding Principal, Dhaka Medical College

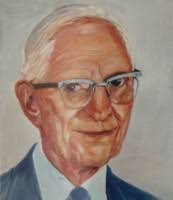

1st Principal of Dhaka Medical College
- In office 1 July 1946 – 14 August 1947
- Succeeded by: Colonel E. G. Montgomery

Personal details
- Born: 16 December 1905
- Died: 18 October 1997 (aged 91)
- Education: University of Toronto

Military service
- Branch/service: Indian Medical Service
- Rank: Major

William John Virgin (16 December 1905 – 18 October 1997) was a serving Major in the former Indian Medical Service in British India. He was the first Principal of Dhaka Medical College. Virgin was born in Toronto, Canada on 16 December 1905. He served primarily in India and, after its formation, Bangladesh.

== Career ==
Virgin graduated with Doctor of Medicine (MD) degree from the University of Toronto in June 1933. Then he became a Fellow of the Royal College of Surgeons of Edinburgh in 1937 and Master of Orthopedic Surgery from the University of Liverpool in 1949.

He was an orthopedic surgeon by profession. He joined the Indian Medical Service, where he was promoted to Lieutenant on 1 August 1933, and Captain on 1 August 1934 [on prob]. He received a promotion to the post of Major on 1 August 1943. He was posted in Dhaka from 1943 to 1947, where he was appointed as the Civil Surgeon of Dhaka.

Virgin was made the head of the committee to establish a medical college in Dhaka. Dhaka Medical College was started on 10 July 1946, and Virgin was made its founding principal, as well as the first superintendent of the Dhaka Medical College Hospital. He also served as the first ever Dean of Faculty of Medicine at the University of Dhaka. On 21 December 1946, Virgin succeeded Major F. H. A. L. Davidson, IMS, as the medical officer of Dhaka Central Jail.

Virgin served as the principal of Dhaka Medical College and Hospital until 14 August 1947. Later, he joined the department of orthopedic surgery of the University of Liverpool as a senior research fellow.

Later in life, he wrote a book on his experience in India titled The India I Knew: Experiences of a Canadian Orthopaedic Surgeon over 50 Years, which was published in 1988.

== Personal life ==
In 1934, Virgin married Zelma Crone, with whom he had five children. He died in Toronto on 18 October 1997 at the age of 91.
