= Lutfor Rahman =

Bangladeshi cardiac surgeon

Doctor Lutfor Rahman
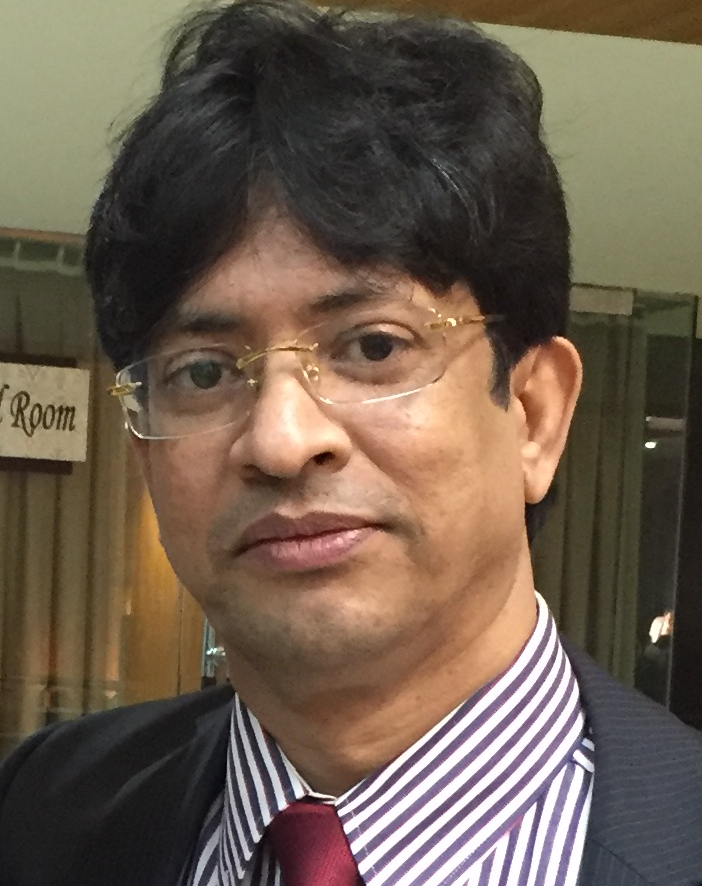
- Born: 1 January 1962 (age 64); Pabna, Bangladesh
- Education: MBBS, MS
- Occupation: Cardiac surgeon
- Years active: 1997–present
- Known for: Cardiac Surgery
- Height: 5 ft 8 in (173 cm)
- Spouse: Rana Ferdous Ratna
- Children: Farisha Khan, Faryal Khan
- Parent(s): Mokbul Hossain Khan, Lutfun Nessa
- Website: http://www.lutforcts.com

Lutfor Rahman (born 1 January 1962) is a pioneer of beating heart bypass surgery in Bangladesh. He currently works at Labaid Cardiac Hospital, Dhaka, Bangladesh as Chief Cardiac Surgeon.

== Early life and education ==
Lutfor Rahman was born on 1 January 1962 in Pabna, Bangladesh. He completed his MBBS from Dhaka Medical College and Hospital in 1988. Later on, in 1997, he completed a Master of Surgery (MS) from National Institute of Cardiovascular Diseases (NICVD).

== Personal life ==
In 1991, Doctor Lutfor Rahman married Rana Ferdous Ratna (BSS and MSS at University of Dhaka), who is a sociologist. Their daughter Farisha Khan is a law graduate from SOAS, University of London, working at Latham & Watkins LPC, the top American law firm in London. Their son Faryal Khan was student of Sunbeams and completed IB at Sevenoaks School, England, now studying undergraduate in Natural science at University of Cambridge, UK.

== Career ==
Rahman worked in government hospitals for 10 years. Later on, he joined Sikder Medical, Dhaka, Bangladesh in 1999 as a cardiac surgeon. In 2002, he became Head of Cardiac Surgery in Sikder Medical. After three years, he moved to Labaid Cardiac Hospital, Dhaka as Chief Cardiac Surgeon. With the qualification of MBBS, MS (CTS), Dr. Lutfor Rahman continues to work as the Chief Cardiac Surgeon in the same hospital at Dhanmondi, Dhaka as of January 2024.

Honorary Awards (2006)

== Election ==
In 1990, after the fall of Ershad, he contested in the national parliament election for an MP position from his own constituency at Pabna.
