= Bangladesh Medical Association =

National association of doctors

- বাংলাদেশ মেডিক্যাল এসোসিয়েশন
- Abbreviation: BMA
- Formation: 14 January 1973; 53 years ago
- Purpose: Professional association for doctors in Bangladesh
- Headquarters: BMA Bhaban, 15 Topkhana Road, Segunbagicha, Dhaka
- Region served: Bangladesh
- President: Mostofa Jalal Mohiuddin
- General Secretary: Md. Ehteshamul Huq Choudhury
- Website: www.bma.org.bd

Bangladesh Medical Association (Bengali: বাংলাদেশ মেডিক্যাল অ্যাসোসিয়েশন) is the national professional association of medical doctors in Bangladesh. Mostofa Jalal Mohiuddin is the president of the Bangladesh Medical Association while Md. Ehteshamul Huq Choudhury is the general secretary. Md. Tarique Mehedi Parvez is the organizing secretary

== History ==
The association traces its origins to the Pakistan Medical Association which was established in 1948. Following the independence of Bangladesh, doctors in Bangladesh reorganized remnants of the Pakistan Medical Association and adopted a constitution of Bangladesh Medical Association on 14 January 1973.

== Structure ==
BMA is run by Central Council and Central executive committee. Officers are elected by the members of BMA for two years. Last election was done in 2017.

== International affiliation ==
The association is a member of the Commonwealth Medical Association and the World Medical Association. It is affiliated with the British Medical Association.

== Branches ==
BMA has 67 regional branches all over the country. Each branch has elected president and general secretary of their own.

== Publications ==
- Bangladesh Medical Journal. ISSN 2219-1607 (ISSN-L 0301-035X)
