= Bangladesh Medical Research Council =

Medical research institute in Bangladesh

- Formation: 1972
- Headquarters: Mohakhali, Dhaka, Bangladesh
- Region served: Bangladesh
- Official language: Bengali
- Key people: Syed Modasser Ali (Chairman)
- Website: www.bmrcbd.org

Bangladesh Medical Research Council is an autonomous national research body that carries out research on medical and health sciences. It prioritizes research in Bangladesh being located in Mohakhali, Dhaka, Bangladesh. Prof. Syed Modasser Ali is the current chairman of the executive committee

== History ==
Bangladesh Medical Research Council was established in 1972. It functions under the Ministry of Health and Family Welfare. It publishes a quarterly journal called the Research Information and Communication on Health.
