= Quazi Deen Mohammad =

Bangladeshi neurologist and academic

- কাজী দীন মোহাম্মদ

Founding Director National Institute of Neurosciences & Hospital
- In office September 2012 – 13 February 2025

President

Bangladesh College of Physicians and Surgeons
- In office March 2019 – 4 March 2023
- Preceded by: Kanak Kanti Barua

Principal

Dhaka Medical College
- In office 2008–2014
- Preceded by: M. A. Faiz
- Succeeded by: Md. Ismail Khan

Personal details
- Born: Luxmipur, Faridpur, Bangladesh
- Education: Dhaka Medical College
- Occupation: Physician, academic, researcher, administrator

Quazi Deen Mohammad is a Bangladeshi physician, academic and neurologist. He was the founding director of National Institute of Neuroscience, Dhaka. He was the 37th principal of Dhaka Medical College and 19th President of Bangladesh College of Physicians and Surgeons (BCPS).

== Early life and education ==
Quazi Deen Mohammad was born in Luxmipur, Faridpur of Bangladesh, the then East Pakistan. He passed SSC from Faridpur Zilla School and HSC from Government Rajendra College. He passed MBBS from Dhaka Medical College in 1978. He completed fellowship in Medicine from Bangladesh College of Physicians and Surgeons in 1983. He did fellowship in clinical neurophysiology from University Hospital Madison, U.S. in 1989. He achieved M.D. in Neurology from University of Dhaka in 1994.

== Career ==
Quazi Deen Mohammad joined as Assistant professor of Neurology at the then IPGMR, now known as Bangladesh Medical University in 1984. He joined Dhaka Medical College as Professor of Neurology in 1996. Later, he worked as the Principal of Dhaka Medical College from 2004 to 2012. Afterwards, he became founding director of National Institute of Neuroscience, where he is currently working as the Professor of Neurology. He regularly provides treatment to his patients at S.P.R.C & Neurology Hospital.

== Research activities ==
- Chairman, Neurology research center, NINS
- Advisor, Neurology Asia, Malaysia
- PI, Annexon 005 clinical trial (C1q suppressor in GBS) in Bangladesh
- PI, community survey Stroke, Epilepsy, Dementia
- Senior contributor in the collaborative study between NINS and Citran (University of Sheffield, UK) on Neurodegenerative disease particularly motor Neuron disease and Parkinson's disease.
- Senior contributor in different collaborative study between NINS and Erasmus MC (Netherlands), CDC Atlanta (U.S.) Annexon (U.S.) and ICDDR,B

== International reviewer ==
- Journal of Neuroscience and Neurological Disorders- Netherlands
- Hindawi Publication, UK
- Horizon Research Publishing, US
- Neurology Asia

== Publications ==
He co-authored Epilepsy- Beliefs & misbelieves – WHO Bulletin. He published 186 research articles in national and internationally reputed journals.

== Awards and honors ==
- Honorary fellowship, College of Physicians and Surgeons Pakistan
- Professor Ibrahim Memorial Gold Medal
