= National Institute of Cardiovascular Diseases =

National Institute of Cardiovascular Diseases may refer to:

- National Institute of Cardiovascular Diseases, Pakistan, Pakistani health organisation
- National Institute of Cardiovascular Diseases, Bangladesh, Bangladeshi government medical college and cardiac hospital
