= Deen Mohammad Noorul Huq =

Bangladeshi physician

- দীন মোহাম্মদ নূরুল হক

Vice-Chancellor of Bangladesh Medical University
- In office 28 March 2024 – 18 August 2024
- Preceded by: Md. Sharfuddin Ahmed
- Succeeded by: Md Sayedur Rahman

Personal details
- Education: Mymensingh Medical College; Bangladesh College of Physicians and Surgeons
- Occupation: Physician, university administrator

Deen Mohammad Noorul Huq is a Bangladeshi ophthalmologist and former vice-chancellor of Bangabandhu Sheikh Mujib Medical University. He is a former director of the National Institute of Ophthalmology & Hospital and former Director General of the Directorate General of Health Services of Bangladesh.

== Early life ==
Huq was born in 1955. He graduated from Mymensingh Medical College with an MBBS in 1979. He got his fellowship in ophthalmology from Bangladesh College of Physicians and Surgeons in 1991. He was a fellow at the Royal Alexandra Hospital, Paisley and Southern General Hospital.

== Career ==
In 2009, Huq was the Line Director of National Eye Care Plan of the Government of the People's Republic of Bangladesh.

Huq served as Director General of the Directorate General of Health Services of Bangladesh. Before that, he served as director of the National Institute of Ophthalmology and Hospital. He was the president of the Ophthalmological Society of Bangladesh and served consecutive two terms as the president of the Academy of Ophthalmology.

Huq was the lead doctor for a team that used to examine the eye of former Prime Minister Sheikh Hasina.

Huq is the chairman of Deen Mohammad Group, which owns Deen Mohammad Eye Hospital and Research Centre, Salauddin Specialized Hospital Limited, and Deen Mohammad Trade International Limited. He is the President of Deen Mohammad Foundation. He is an advisor of Bangladesh Vitreo Retina Society.

In March 2024, Huq was appointed vice-chancellor of Bangabandhu Sheikh Mujib Medical University. He established Deen Mohammad Eye Hospital and Research Centre.
