= A. H. M. Touhidul Anowar Chowdhury =

Bangladeshi gynaecologist and obstetrician (1937–2025)

- Born: 10 October 1937
- Died: 8 March 2025 (aged 87); Dhaka, Bangladesh
- Education: Dhaka Medical College
- Medical career
- Profession: Gynecologist and obstetrician
- Institutions: IPGMER
- Research: Endoscopic surgery, microsurgery, infertility
- Awards: Independence Day Award (2017, Medicine)

A. H. M. Touhidul Anowar Chowdhury (Bengali: এ এইচ এম তৌহিদুল আনোয়ার চৌধুরী; 10 October 1937 – 8 March 2025), commonly known as T. A. Chowdhury, was a Bangladeshi gynaecologist and obstetrician who was awarded Independence Day Award in medical science in 2017.

== Early life and education ==
Chowdhury was born on 10 October 1937. He passed MBBS from Dhaka Medical College in 1960. He achieved FRCS from the Royal College of Surgeons of Edinburgh. He obtained MRCOG from the Royal College of Obstetricians and Gynecologists in London, UK, in 1965.

== Career ==
Chowdhury was director of the then IPGMR. He also served as president of Bangladesh College of Physicians and Surgeons.

== Death ==
Chowdhury died at his home on 8 March 2025, at the age of 87.

== Awards and honours ==
Chowdhury was awarded Independence Day Award in medicine in 2017.
