= A. R. M. Luthful Kabir =

Bangladeshi physician

- এ আর এম লুৎফুল কবীর
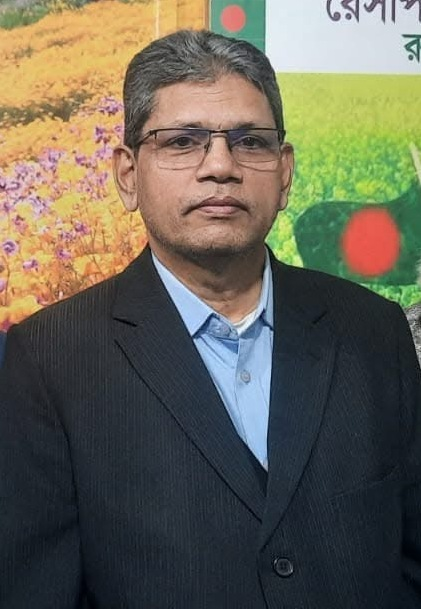
- Kabir in 2023

Executive Director of Institute of Child and Mother Health
- In office 26 January 2004 – 17 June 2004
- In office 24 December 2008 – 1 September 2009

Personal details
- Born: 22 February 1957 (age 69) Daudkandi Upazila, Comilla
- Education: Mymensingh Medical College; Bangladesh College of Physicians and Surgeons
- Occupation: Physician, academic, researcher, administrator
- Website: drluthfulkabir.com

A. R. M. Luthful Kabir (Bengali: এ আর এম লুৎফুল কবীর; born 22 February 1957) is a Bangladeshi physician and academic. (Note: Multiple references:) He was the executive director of Institute of Child and Mother Health, Dhaka. He was also the head of pediatrics department and professor at different government and private medical colleges.

== Early life and education ==
He passed SSC from Mymensingh Zilla School. He passed MBBS from Mymensingh Medical College in 1980. He completed fellowship from Bangladesh College of Physicians and Surgeons in 1988. He had clinical fellowship in Pediatric Respiratory Medicine from Royal Alexandra Hospital for Children in 1995. He is married to professor Dr. Nazneen Kabir.

== Career ==
He was Professor of Pediatrics and Executive Director of Institute of Child and Mother Health, Matuail (2008-2009). He was the head of Pediatrics at Sylhet MAG Osmani Medical College, Faridpur Medical College and Sir Salimullah Medical College. He was the founder General Secretary and also the president of Bangladesh Pediatric Pulmonology Forum. He is also the life member of Bangladesh Paediatric Association. He was also the head of Pediatrics Department at Ad-din Women's Medical College. He is currently the Chief Adviser of the Bangladesh Pediatric Pulmonology Forum.

== Contributions ==
Prof. Luthful Kabir is the pioneer personality in pediatric respiratory research in Bangladesh; the founder General Secretary of Bangladesh Pediatric Pulmonology Forum, BPPF (2002); discovered Bronchiolitis in Bangladesh (2001); proved that the commonest cause of respiratory distress in young children is bronchiolitis, not pneumonia in a nationwide study (Journal of Respiratory Medicine Research and Treatment-2016) and no antibiotic is needed for its treatment in a multicenter randomized controlled trial having the largest sample size ever conducted (Acta Pediatrica-2009); his 2 studies on antibiotics in bronchiolitis (among 7 out of 728 during the period of 48 years 1966-2014) have been placed in world famous Cochrane database. He also showed that bronchiolitis is misdiagnosed and antibiotics are misused (JGoH 2026)

== Publications ==
Prof Luthful Kabir has more than 162 scientific publications. in national and international journals including 23 books. Some of the published books are: Pediatric Practice on Parents’ Presentations (2011), Pediatric Practice on Parents’ Presentations-189 live cases, two volumes (published in Germany, 2014), Clinical and Visual Pediatrics (2019), Shishu-O-Hashi (2015), Co-author of Atlas on Clinical Pediatrics, Paediatric Clinical Radiology & Imaging and Pediatric Clinical Clerking and Beyond. He donated Taka 50,00,000 (fifty lac) only to Bangladesh Pediatric Association as Research Grant for postgraduate students.

== Awards and honors ==
He received Thanks Letter for research from the Director General of Health Services of Bangladesh Prof Abul Kalam Azad in 2017. In 2018 Tofayel Ahmed Memorial Award by Bangladesh Palli Shishu Foundation for his academic and research contribution.

On 15 February 2023, he was also given a lifetime achievement award by Bangladesh Lung Foundation (BLF) in the 7th International Pulmocon held in Bangabandhu International Conference Centre.
