= Sher-e-Bangla Medical College =

Medical school in Barisal, Bangladesh

- শের-ই-বাংলা মেডিকেল কলেজ
- Logo of Sher-e-Bangla Medical College
- Former name: Barisal Medical College
- Type: Public medical school
- Established: 1968; 58 years ago
- Academic affiliations: University of Dhaka
- Principal: Md. Faizul Bashar
- Director: H.M.Saiful Islam
- Students: 1500
- Location: Barisal, Bangladesh; 22.688°N 90.361°E
- Campus: Urban
- Language: English
- Website: www.sbmc.edu.bd

Sher-e-Bangla Medical College (SBMC) is a public medical school in Bangladesh, established in 1968. The college is located in Barisal. It is affiliated with University of Dhaka as a constituent college.

SBMC awards MBBS degree and offers professional training and medical research facility at its 1,000-bed hospital. As per the declaration of overseas registration of the General Medical Council, the recipient of the awarded MBBS degree during or after October 1984 is eligible to apply for registration in United Kingdom. The college has an area of about 81.545 acres. Student dormitories, nursing institute, nurses' training institute, dormitory for staff nurses, and residences of teachers are situated on the campus.

== History ==
Construction began on the college on 6 November 1964, at which time it was known as Barisal Medical College. It opened to students in 1968 and was soon renamed to its current title, bestowed in honor of former prime minister A. K. Fazlul Huq in 1977, a resident of Barisal, was often called by the phrase "Sher-e-Bangla", which translates "The Tiger of Bengal".

== Campus ==
The campus is spacious with college building containing 4 multimedia lecture galleries, a library, students reading room, doctor's reading room, cyber cafe. The campus house 1000 bed hospital with a 30-bed burn and plastic surgery unit, a 10-bed ICU unit, a new COVID unit with 150 beds and 18 ICU, DOTS corner, 15 bed CCU, One stop Crisis Center, RH Step, Institute of Nuclear Medicine And Allied Sciences. It also has a Shaheed Minar, Mukta Mancha and Golden Jubilee Memoir.

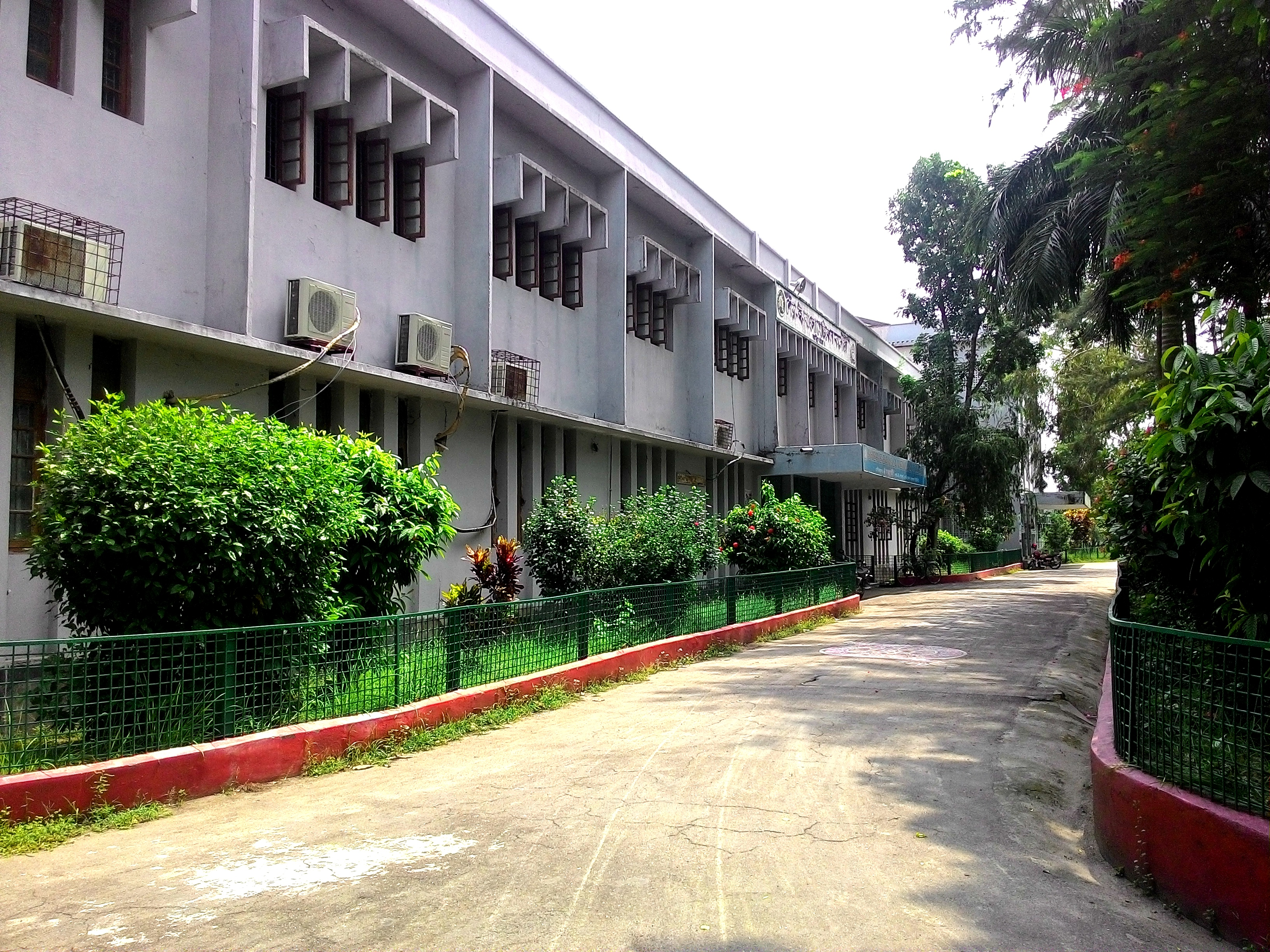
SBMC academic building

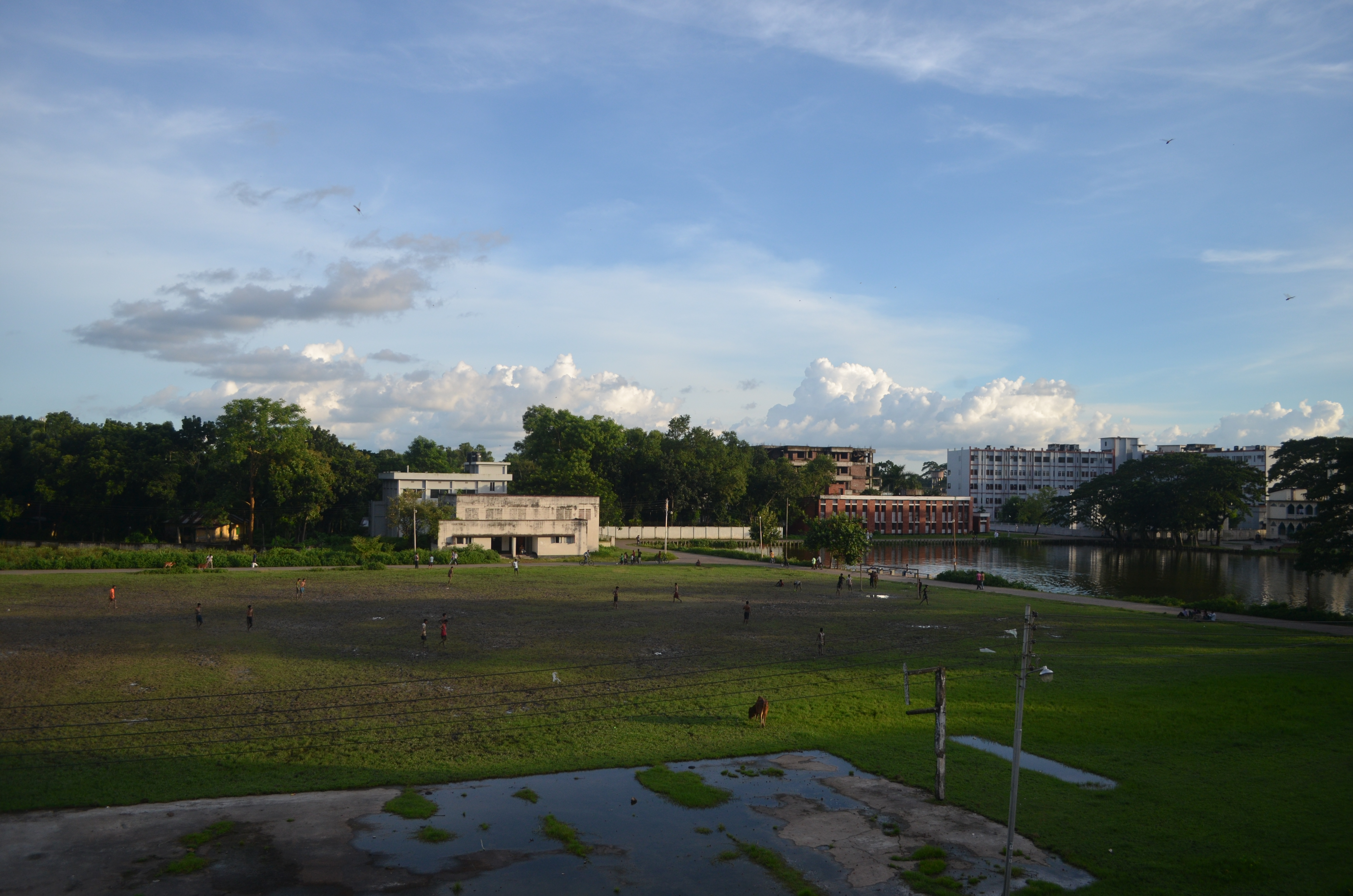
Sher-e-Bangla Medical College Campus

== Students' accommodation ==
There are three hostels for male students and three for the female students. Both male and female intern doctors have each one hostel for them.

== Organization and administration ==
The Principal is the head of the institution. The other staff members include one vice principal, 21 professors, 28 associate professors, 29 assistant professors, 2 curators, 44 lecturers, 6 medical officers, 1 secretary, and 188 paramedics and auxiliary staff.

== Yearly programs ==
Every year the students and different organizations of the SBMC arrange different cultural and religious programs. Every batch of this college celebrates their 5th year ending program. Every year, the students of this institution celebrate 16 December - the victory day of Bangladesh, 21 February - International Mother Language Day, 26 March - the Independence day of Bangladesh, 15 August - the national mourning day and other historical and significant days of the country. Beside this, they also celebrate Eid ul Fitr, Eid-ul-Azha, Eid E Miladunnabi and other Islamic festivals.

The Hindu students of the college also celebrate Saraswati puja every year. For celebration and arrangement of the Saraswati puja, the Hindu students of the institution form a governing body titled 'Puja Udjapon Porishod' under the supervision of the teachers and senior students of the previous committee. On the day of the Saraswati puja, the college is decorated in traditional way. After the puja, the Puja Udjapan Porishod arranges a grand cultural night, which is one of the greatest traditions of this college. The students of the SBMC perform at that program, as well as famous singers, bands are invited to cheer the spectators. They also celebrate 'Dipaboli or Diwali'-the festival of lights. On that night the campus is decorated with candles and oil lamps. Many people visit to enjoy the beauty of that night from different parts of Barisal.

Sher-E-Bangla Medical College Debating Forum (SBMCDF) organizes the National Inter-Medical Debate Tournament annually, as well as Intra-Medical Debate Tournaments. The institution is well known for its debating achievements, culture, and legacy on the inter-medical debating platform.

== Student organizations ==
- Sher-E-Bangla Medical College Debating Forum
- Sandhani
- Medicine Club
- Red Crescent Youth

== Notable alumni ==
- F. M. Siddiqui, vice-chancellor of Bangladesh Medical University
- Md. Sharfuddin Ahmed, former vice-chancellor of Bangladesh Medical University
- Quazi Rashid-Un-Nabi, director general of the Directorate General of Medical Services
- Nasim Biswas, former member of parliament

== Photo gallery ==
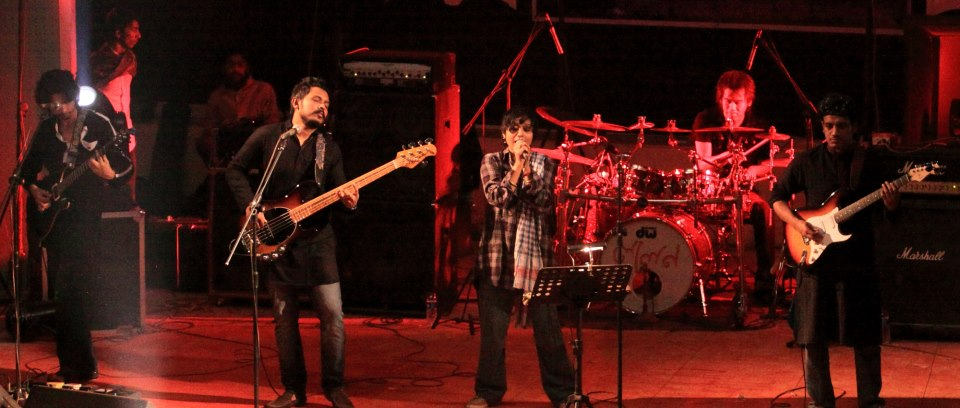
Famous band 'Lalon' performing on a cultural program arranged by Puja Udjapon Porshod-2013

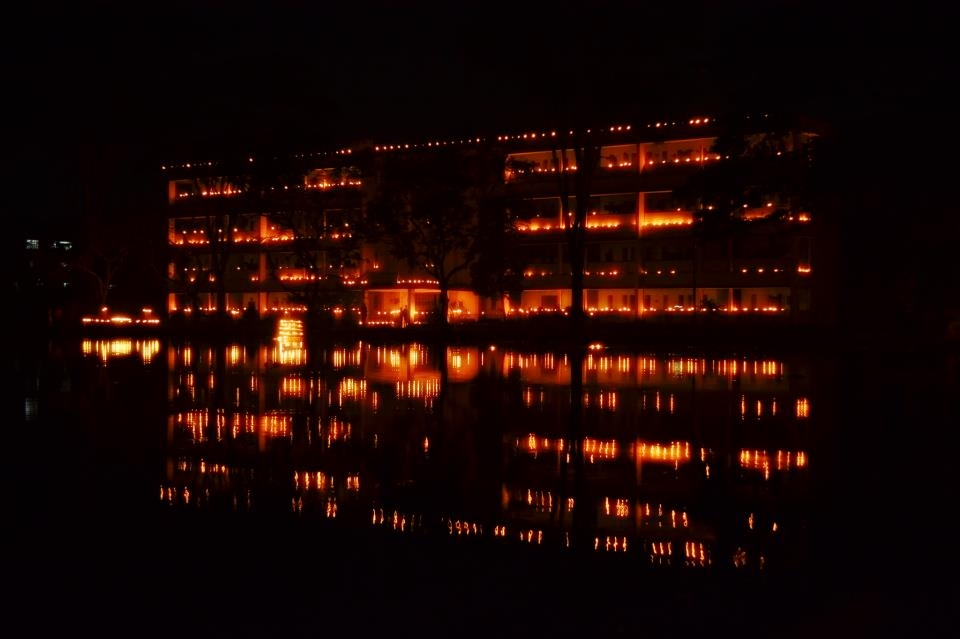
On Dipaboli night students of SBMC decorate Jamilur Rahman male students House(2013)

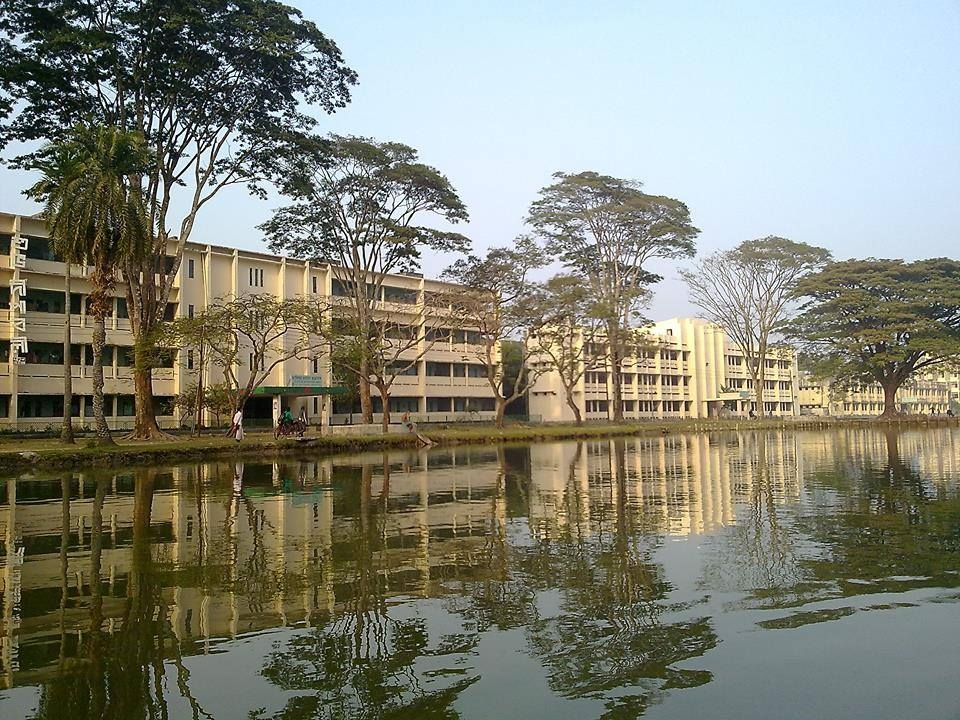
Three male students houses of SBMC

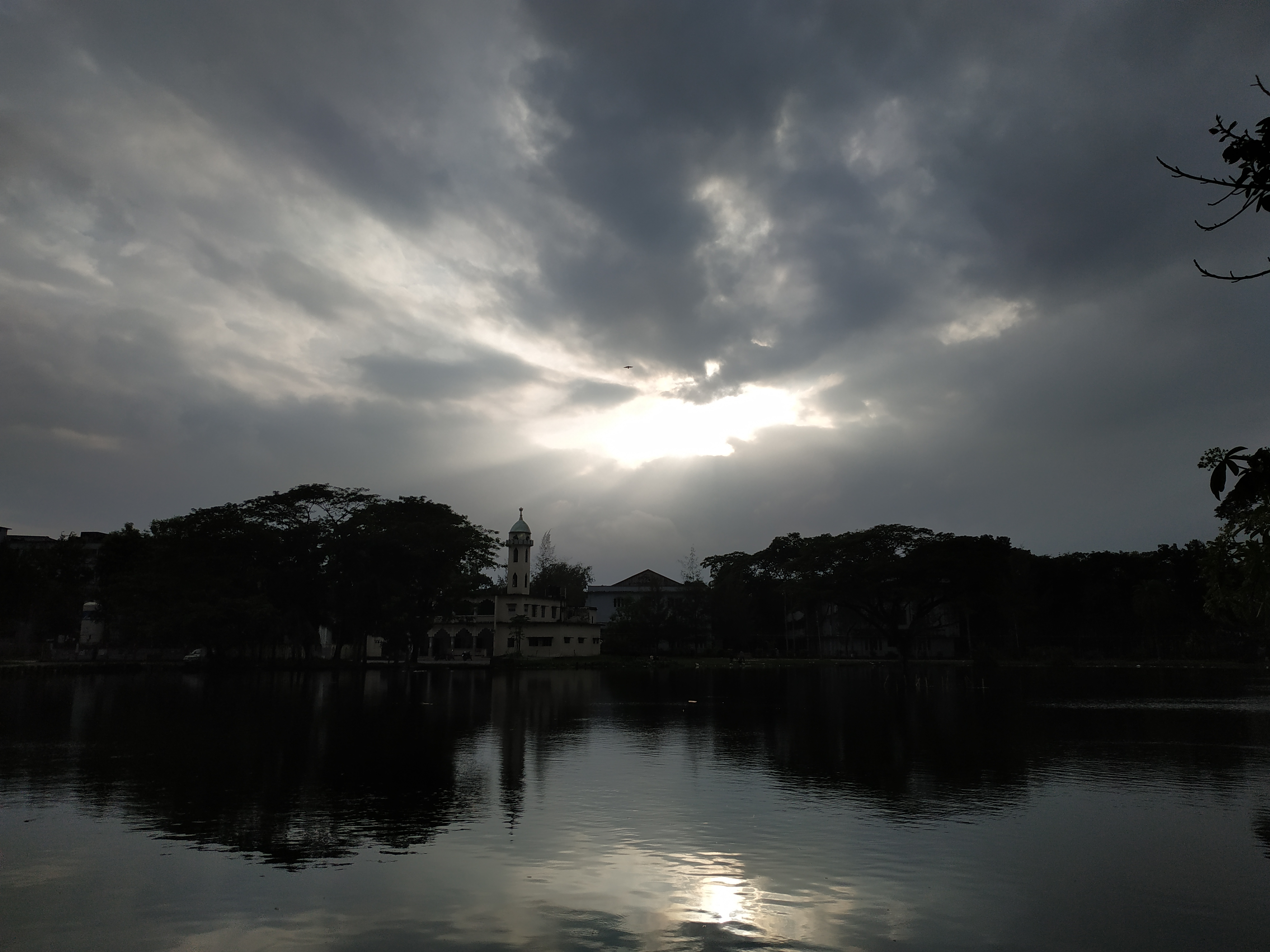
Pond

== See also ==
- List of medical colleges in Bangladesh
