= Kamrul Hasan Khan =

Bangladeshi academic (born 1955)

7th Vice Chancellor of Bangabandhu Sheikh Mujib Medical University
- In office March 24, 2015 – March 23, 2018
- Preceded by: Pran Gopal Datta
- Succeeded by: Kanak Kanti Barua

Personal details
- Born: March 12, 1955 (age 71)

Kamrul Hasan Khan is a Bangladeshi renowned pathologist, academic and freedom fighter who served as the Vice Chancellor of Bangabandhu Sheikh Mujib Medical University (BSMMU).

== Education and career ==
Khan passed his MBBS from Mymensingh Medical College in 1982. He then joined government service as a medical officer in 1984. He later joined IPGMR (later renamed BSMMU) in 1991.

== Personal life ==
Freedom fighter Kamrul Hassan Khan was born on March 12, 1955, in Bhavandatta village of Ghatail Upazila of Tangail District. Khan's ancestors originated from Tangail. He is married to Masuda Begum, a professor of hematology. Khan's elder brother, Mamunur Rashid, is a playwright, actor and theater activist.

== Research and social work ==
Kamrul served as the general secretary of the association at Bangabandhu Sheikh Mujib Medical University from 1999 to 2015. Do a study titled 'Effects of Topical Application of Ethylene Glycol on Rats'. Khan is a two-time elected organizational secretary of the Bangladesh Medical Association (BMA), former joint secretary of the BCS Central Coordination Council (26 cadre), a member of the Working Council of the Progressive Association of Bangladesh Environmental Movement (BAPA) and engineers, agronomists and physicians, Central In-Service Joint Trainee Physician Council. He served as a life adviser to the caller and the finder.
