= Md. Shahinul Alam =

Bangladeshi physician and academic

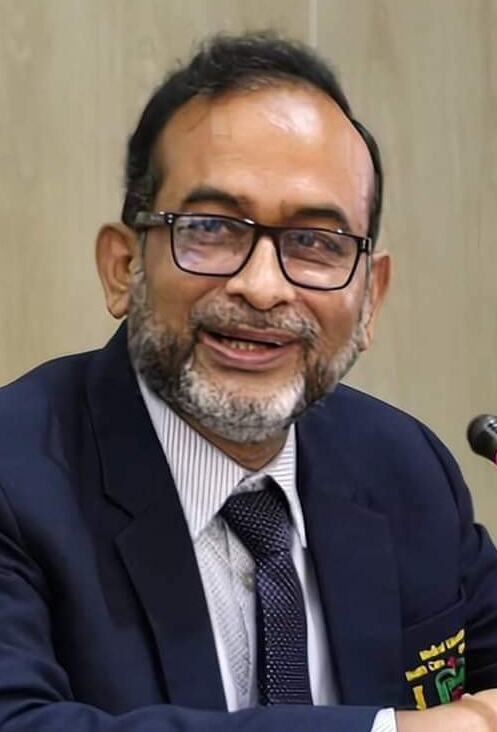
- Alam in 2025

Vice-chancellor of Bangladesh Medical University
- In office 4 December 2024 – 9 March 2026
- Preceded by: Md Sayedur Rahman
- Succeeded by: F. M. Siddiqui

Personal details
- Education: Dhaka College Chittagong Medical College

Md. Shahinul Alam is a Bangladeshi physician and academic. He was the vice-chancellor of Bangladesh Medical University (BMU). Prior to this appointment, he served as the pro-vice chancellor (academic) of the same institution.

Alam was born in Ramganj Upazila, Lakshmipur District. He passed HSC from Dhaka College and MBBS from Chittagong Medical College.
