= M Iqbal Arslan =

Bangladeshi physician

M Iqbal Arslan is a Bangladeshi physician and academic. He is the incumbent president of Swadhinata Chikitshak Parishad (SWACHIP), an organisation of pro-Awami League doctors of Bangladesh. He is the former dean of the Faculty of Basic Science and Paraclinical Science at Bangabandhu Sheikh Mujib Medical University (BSMMU).

== Education ==
Arslan passed MBBS from Dhaka Medical College. He completed a M.Phil in biochemistry later.

== Academic career ==
Arslan joined BSMMU and served as chairman of the Department of Biochemistry. In 2010, Arslan was elected dean of the Faculty of Basic Science and Paraclinical Science.

== Organisational affiliation ==
Arslan was elected as general secretary of SWACHIP in 2003. He was elected as president of the same organisation in 2015. Arslan was elected general secretary of Bangladesh Medical Association in 2012. Arslan was also elected as member of Dhaka University senate in 2018. Arslan is also a member of the executive committee of the Bangladesh Medical & Dental Council, the regulatory authority for doctors of Bangladesh.

Arslan is appointed as member of the National Technical Advisory Committee of COVID-19 management in Bangladesh.
