= Md. Sharfuddin Ahmed =

Bangladeshi ophthalmologist

- মো. শারফুদ্দিন আহমেদ

Vice-Chancellor of Bangabandhu Sheikh Mujib Medical University
- In office 29 March 2021 – 28 March 2024
- Preceded by: Kanak Kanti Barua
- Succeeded by: Deen Mohammad Noorul Huq

Personal details
- Born: 7 October 1956 (age 69)
- Education: Sher-e-Bangla Medical College; Bangabandhu Sheikh Mujib Medical University
- Occupation: Physician, academic, university administrator

Md. Sharfuddin Ahmed is a Bangladeshi physician and academic. He is the former vice-chancellor of Bangabandhu Sheikh Mujib Medical University (BSMMU). He served as pro vice chancellor (administration) of BSMMU and secretary general of Bangladesh Medical Association (BMA).

== Early life and education ==
Ahmed was born in Gopalgonj in 1956. He passed S.S.C from Kasiani GC High School in 1972 and H.S.C from Government Rajendra College in 1974. He completed MBBS from Sher-e-Bangla Medical College (SBMC) in 1982. He obtained Diploma in Ophthalmology (DO) from IPGMR (now, BSMMU) in 1985. He achieved MS in ophthalmology from Bangabandhu Sheikh Mujib Medical University (BSMMU) in 2004.

== Career ==
Ahmed served as professor and chairman of Community Ophthalmology at Bangabandhu Sheikh Mujib Medical University (BSMMU). He was appointed as vice-chancellor of BSMMU in March 2021.

== Professional positions held ==
- President, Bangladesh Community Ophthalmology Society
- President, Bangladesh Oculoplasty Surgeon's Society
- President, Shadhinota Chikitshok Parishad, Bangabandhu Sheikh Mujib Medical University
- Secretary General, Bangladesh Medical Association
- Secretary General, Ophthalmological Society of Bangladesh
- Vice-president, Bangladesh Academy of Ophthalmology
- Treasurer, Bangladesh Medical Association
- Academic Council Member, Bangabandhu Sheikh Mujib Medical University
- Syndicate Member, Bangabandhu Sheikh Mujib Medical University
- Senate Member, University of Dhaka
- President, Bangladesh Chattra League (student league), Sher-E-Bangla Medical College, Barisal
- Executive Member, Bangladesh National Council for Blind
- Executive Member, Bangladesh Medical Dental Council, etc.

== Publications ==
He has published five books and more than a hundred research articles in national and internationally reputed journals.

== Awards and honors ==
- Mobarak Ali Gold Medal 2020 from OSB
- AIOC Award in Gurugram, 2020
- ISMICS Gold Award 2019 Kolkata, India
- Alim Memorial Gold Medal in 2019 from OSB
- Distinguished Service Award from Dristry Unnyan Sangstha, 2018
- SAARC Academy of Ophthalmology, PVP Award in Nepal, 2018
- Prevention of Blindness Award form APAO Singapore, 2017
- ACOIN-Felicitation Award 2017, Kolkata, India
- Distinguished Service Award form APAO, Bhutan, Korea 2012
- Independence Award by National Teachers Association, 2010, etc.
