= Bangladesh Medical University =

Public medical university in Dhaka, Bangladesh

- বাংলাদেশ মেডিক্যাল বিশ্ববিদ্যালয়
- Crest of BMU
- Other name: BMU
- Former names: Institute of Postgraduate Medicine and Research (1965–1998); Bangabandhu Sheikh Mujib Medical University (1998–2025)
- Type: Public postgraduate medical university
- Established: 1965; 61 years ago
- Chancellor: President Mirza Fakhrul Islam Alamgir
- Vice-Chancellor: F. M. Siddiqui
- Director (Hospital): Brig. Gen. Dr. Irtika Rahman
- Location: Shahbag, Kazi Nazrul Islam Avenue, Dhaka, Bangladesh; 23.7389°N 90.3948°E
- Campus: Urban
- Website: bmu.ac.bd

Bangladesh Medical University (BMU) is a postgraduate medical university in Dhaka, Bangladesh. It was established in 1965 as Institute of Postgraduate Medicine and Research (IPGMR). It offers postgraduate degrees in various medical specialties including MD, MS, MPhil, MPH, and diploma degrees. It also serves as a teaching and tertiary referral hospital.

In 2022, a 750-bed super-specialised hospital was established at BMU.

== History ==
The establishment of the university was an upgrade of the IPGMR which was established in December 1965 as a government-controlled postgraduate institute for medical research and education. It was housed in Hotel Shahbag, which is now defunct and was once the biggest hotel in Dhaka. The hotel was named after the Shahbagh neighborhood where it was located.

It was renamed after the first president of Bangladesh, Sheikh Mujibur Rahman, by Act 1 of 1998 of the Bangladesh Parliament.

Since 2010, many medical and public health colleges/institutes became affiliated to Bangabandhu Sheikh Mujib Medical University (BSMMU), such as BIRDEM, BIHS, DMC, SSMC, NICVD, and NITOR.

After the fall of the former prime minister of Bangladesh Sheikh Hasina-led Awami League government, on 13 April 2025, the government of Bangladesh issued an ordinance renaming the university Bangladesh Medical University.

== Library and publications ==
BMU has an academic library known as BMU Central Library, and a digital library. The university publishes a peer-reviewed medical journal, Bangabandhu Sheikh Mujib Medical University Journal. ISSN 2224-7750(online)2074-2908 (print). It publishes 4 issue per year.

== Vice-chancellors ==
The institution has had ten vice-chancellors since it began in 1998:

1. M. A. Qadri (30 April 1998 - 9 January 2001)
2. Md. Tahir (10 January 2001 - 17 May 2001)
3. Mahmud Hasan (18 May 2001 - 23 November 2001)
4. M. A. Hadi (24 November 2001 - 21 December 2006)
5. Md. Tahir (21 December 2006 - 4 November 2008)
6. Md. Nazrul Islam (5 November 2008 - 24 March 2009)
7. Pran Gopal Datta (25 March 2009 – 24 March 2012)
8. Pran Gopal Datta (25 March 2012 – 24 March 2015)
9. Kamrul Hasan Khan (24 March 2015 – 23 March 2018)
10. Kanak Kanti Barua (24 March 2018 –23 March 2021)
11. Md. Sharfuddin Ahmed (29 March 2021 – 28 March 2024)
12. Deen Mohammad Noorul Huq (28 March - 18 August 2024)
13. Md Sayedur Rahman (28 August 2024 – 4 December 2024)
14. Md. Shahinul Alam (4 December 2024 – 9 March 2026)
15. F. M. Siddiqui (9 March 2026 - present)

== Campus ==
The BMU campus has five multiple-floor buildings that house a variety of academic, medical, and residential spaces. The Graduate Nursing campus is located in Poribagh, Shahbag, Dhaka.

== Faculty and departments ==
It consists of 8 faculties: Faculty of Medicine, Faculty of Surgery, Faculty of Basic Science and Para Clinical Science, Faculty of Dentistry, Faculty of Paediatrics, Faculty of Medical Technology, Faculty of Nursing, and Faculty of Preventive and Social Medicine. These faculties offer courses such as MD, MS, M.Phil., M.MEd, BSN, MSN, Diploma, MPH, and PhD.

== Admission procedure ==
Admission procedures for MD, MS, M.Phil., M.MEd, Diploma, MPH, BSN, MSN, and PhD programs vary each year. The admission process includes a written test, followed by a viva and a final medical examination. Admission is highly competitive in Bangladesh, with only a few students being selected. Every student receives a stipend from the Graduate Nursing Department, which is staffed by renowned teachers.

== Affiliated health sciences institutions ==
List of affiliated colleges/institutes under BMU:

- Armed Forces Medical Institute (AFMI), Dhaka
- Bangladesh Institute of Child Health (BICH), Dhaka
- Bangladesh Institute of Health Sciences
- Bangladesh Institute of Research & Rehabilitation in Diabetes, Endocrine & Metabolic Disorders (BIRDEM Academy), Dhaka
- Center for Medical Education (CME), Dhaka
- Dhaka Dental College, Dhaka
- Dhaka Medical College, Dhaka
- Enam Nursing College, Savar, Dhaka
- Faridpur Medical College, Faridpur
- Ibrahim Cardiac Hospital & Research Institute
- Institute of Child and Mother Health (ICMH), Dhaka
- Institute of Child Health & Shishu Sasthya Foundation Hospital, Dhaka
- Institute of Community Ophthalmology, Chittagong
- Ispahani Islamia Eye Institute and Hospital, Dhaka
- Kumudini Welfare Trust, Mirzapur, Tangail
- Lions Eye Institute & Hospital, Dhaka
- Mymensingh Medical College, Mymensingh
- National Institute of Advanced Nursing Education and Research, Dhaka
- National Heart Foundation Hospital & Research Institute, Dhaka
- National Institute of Cardiovascular Diseases (NICVD), Dhaka
- National Institute of Cancer Research & Hospital, Dhaka
- National Institute of Diseases of the Chest and Hospital (NIDCH), Dhaka
- National Institute of Kidney Diseases & Urology (NIKDU), Dhaka
- National Institute of Mental Health (NIMH), Dhaka
- National Institute of Neurosciences & Hospital
- National Institute of Nuclear Medicine & Allied Science, Dhaka
- National Institute of Ophthalmology (NIO), Dhaka
- National Institute of Preventive and Social Medicine (NIPSOM), Dhaka
- National Institute of Traumatology and Orthopedic Rehabilitation (NITOR), Dhaka
- National Institute of ENT, Tejgaon, Dhaka
- Shaheed Suhrawardy Medical College, Dhaka
- National Institute of Burn and Plastic Surgery
- Sir Salimullah Medical College, Dhaka.
- International Medical College, Gazipur

== Gallery ==
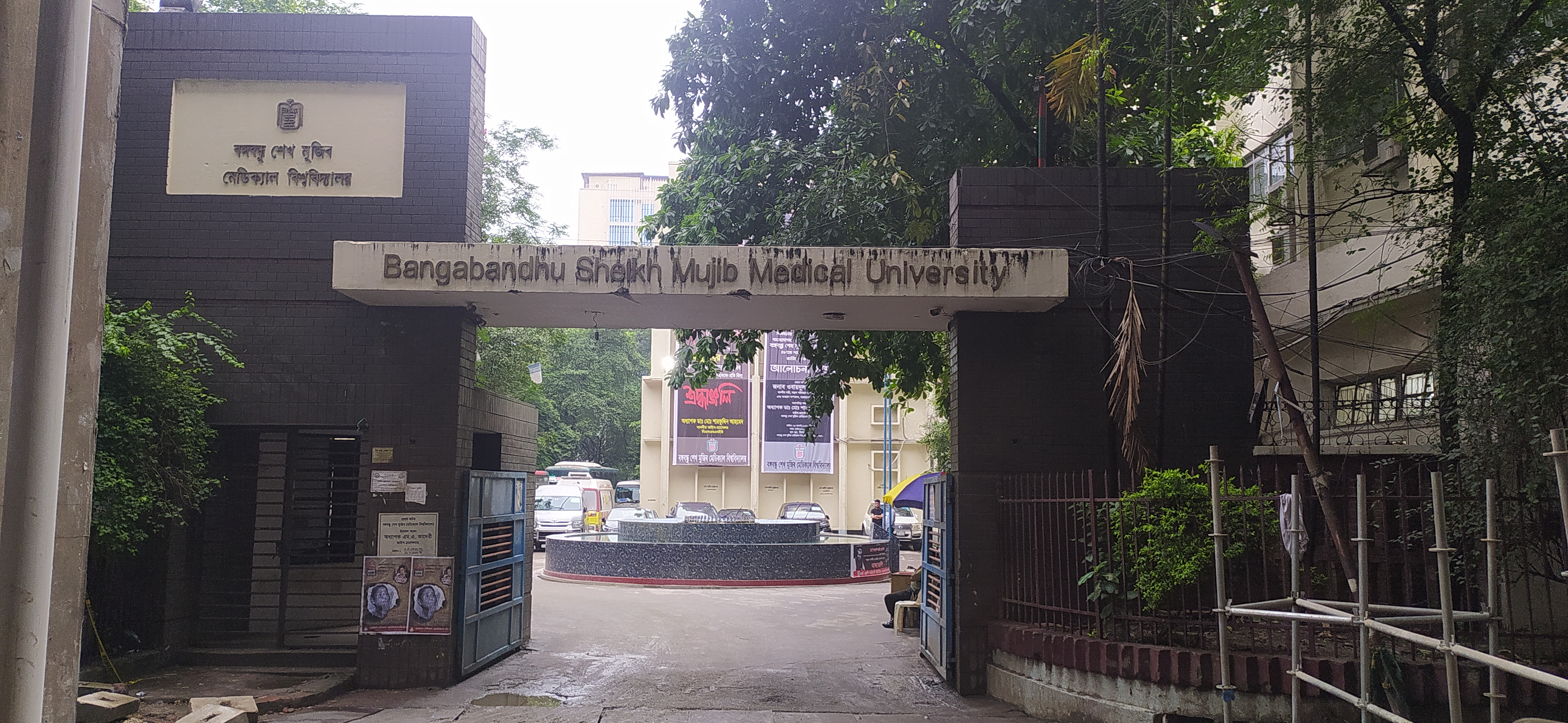
BMU Main Gate

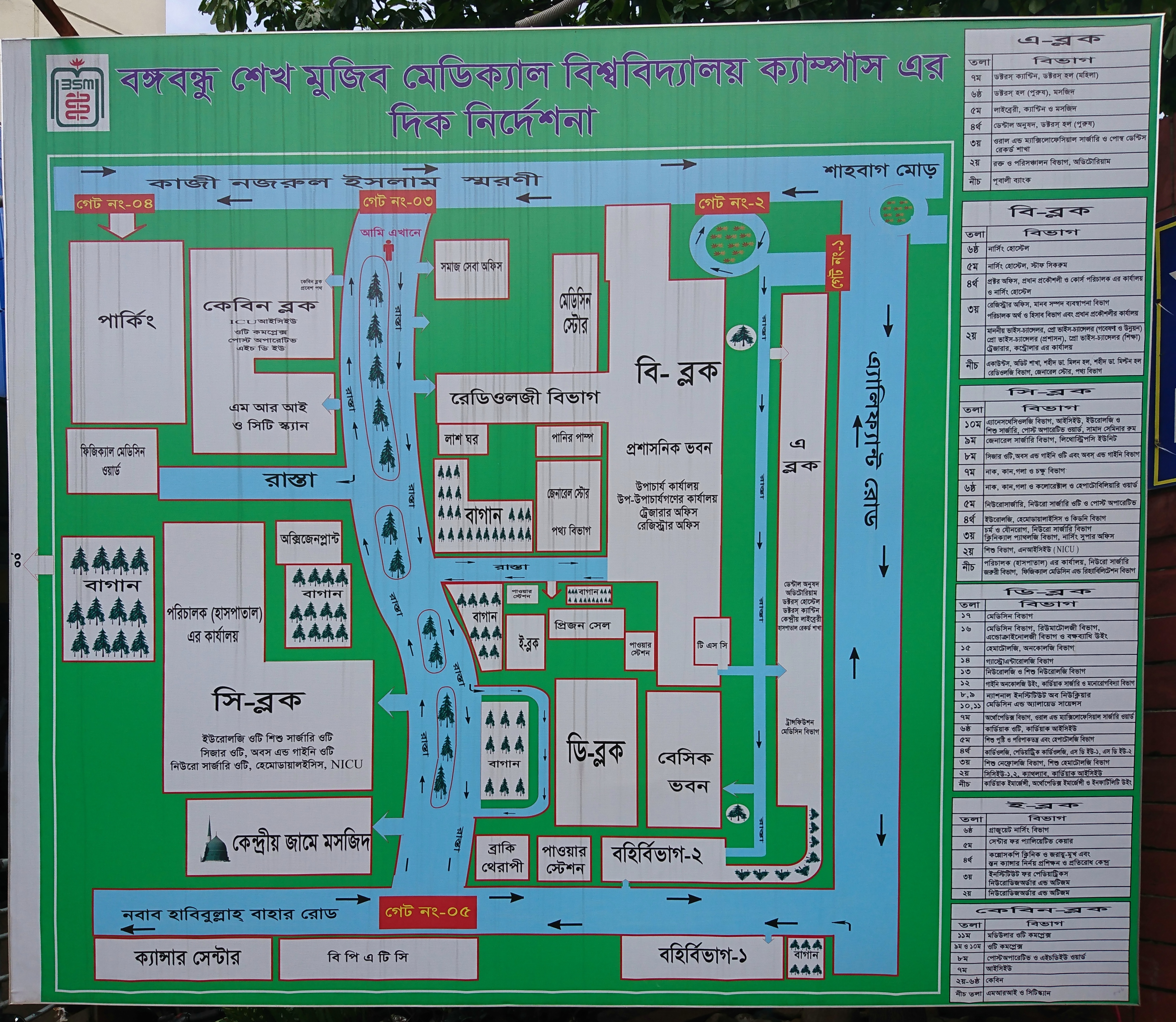
Schematic layout of BMU campus

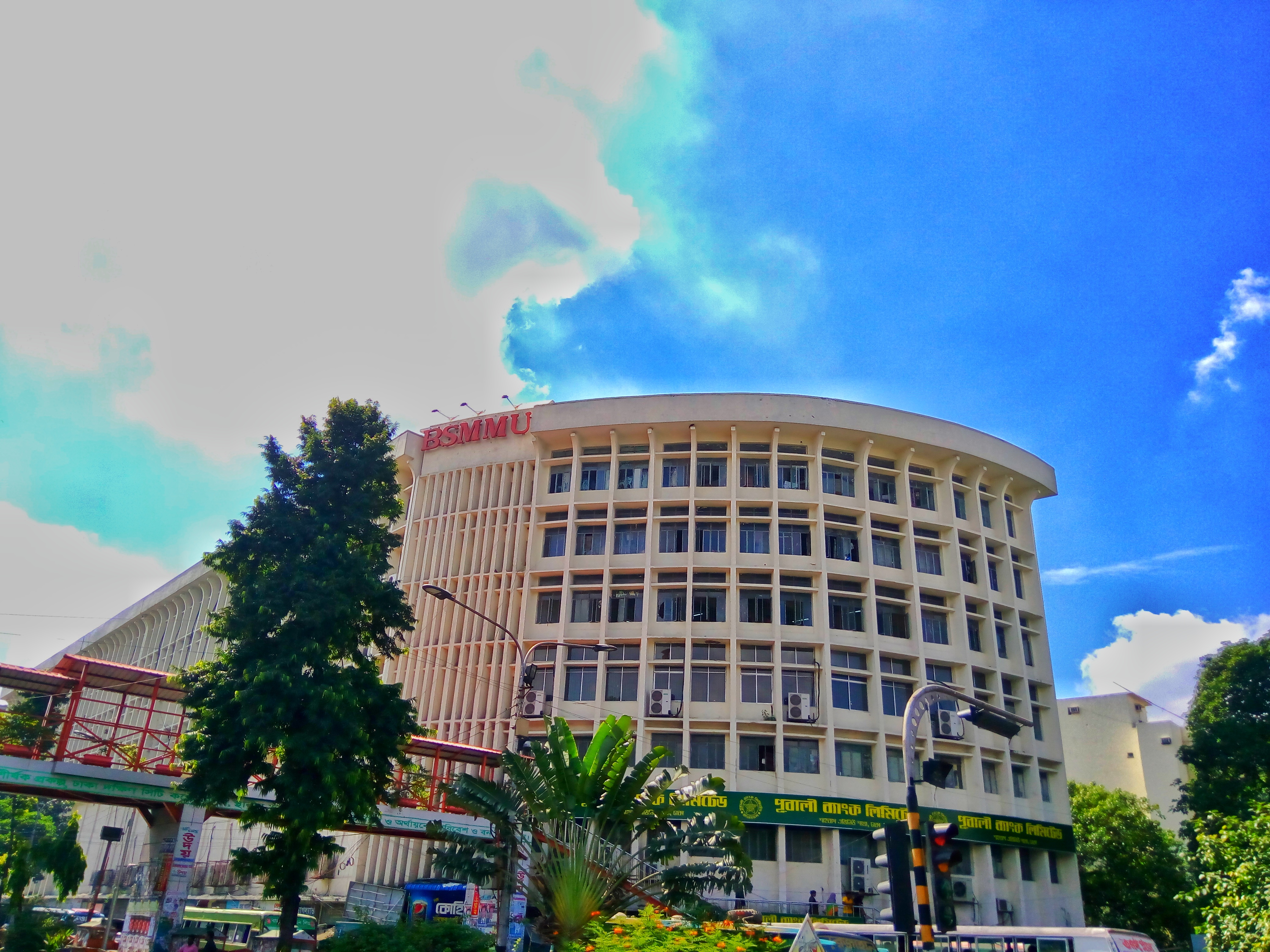
BMU A block from Shahbag Square

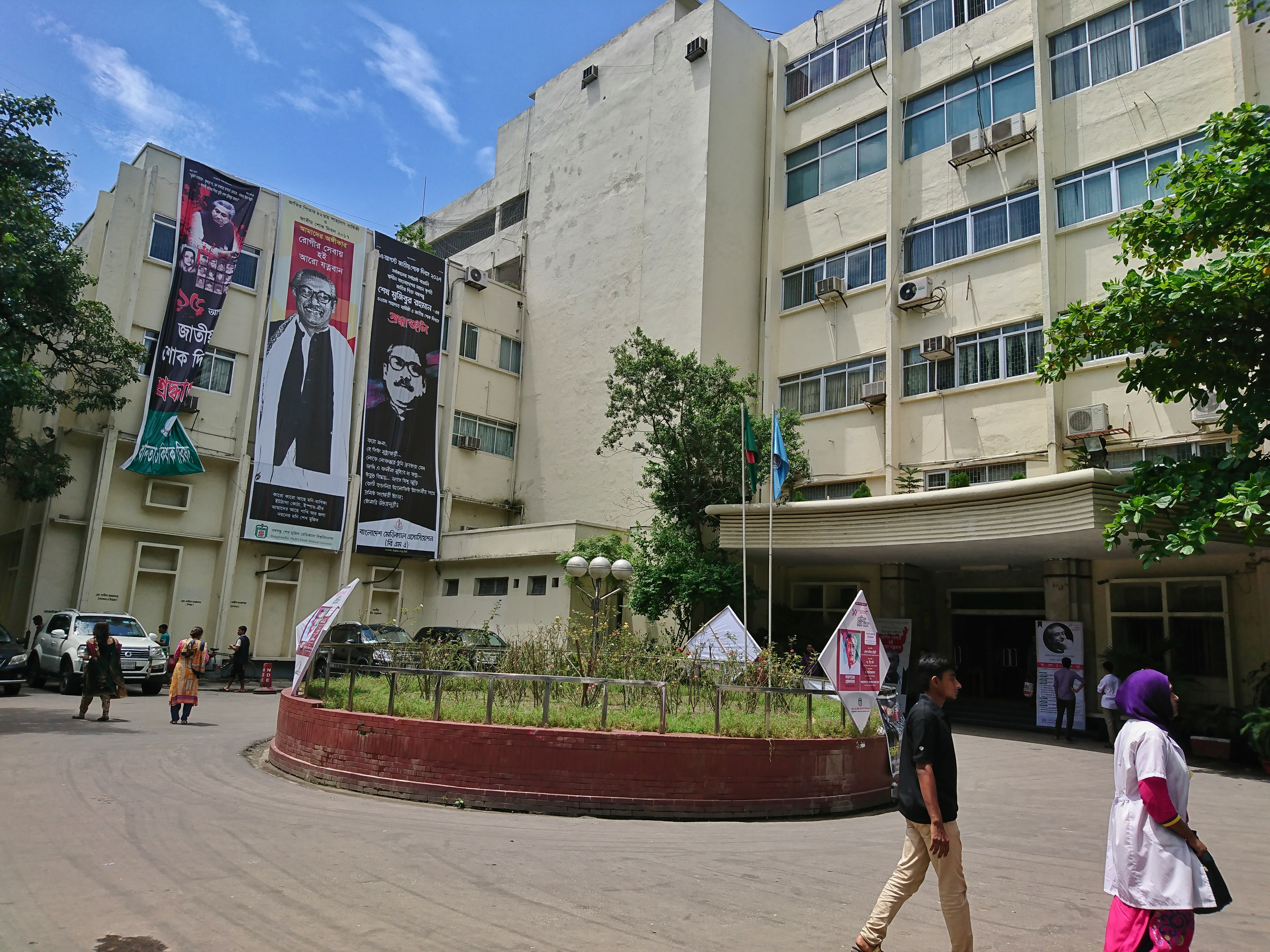
B block (Academic building).

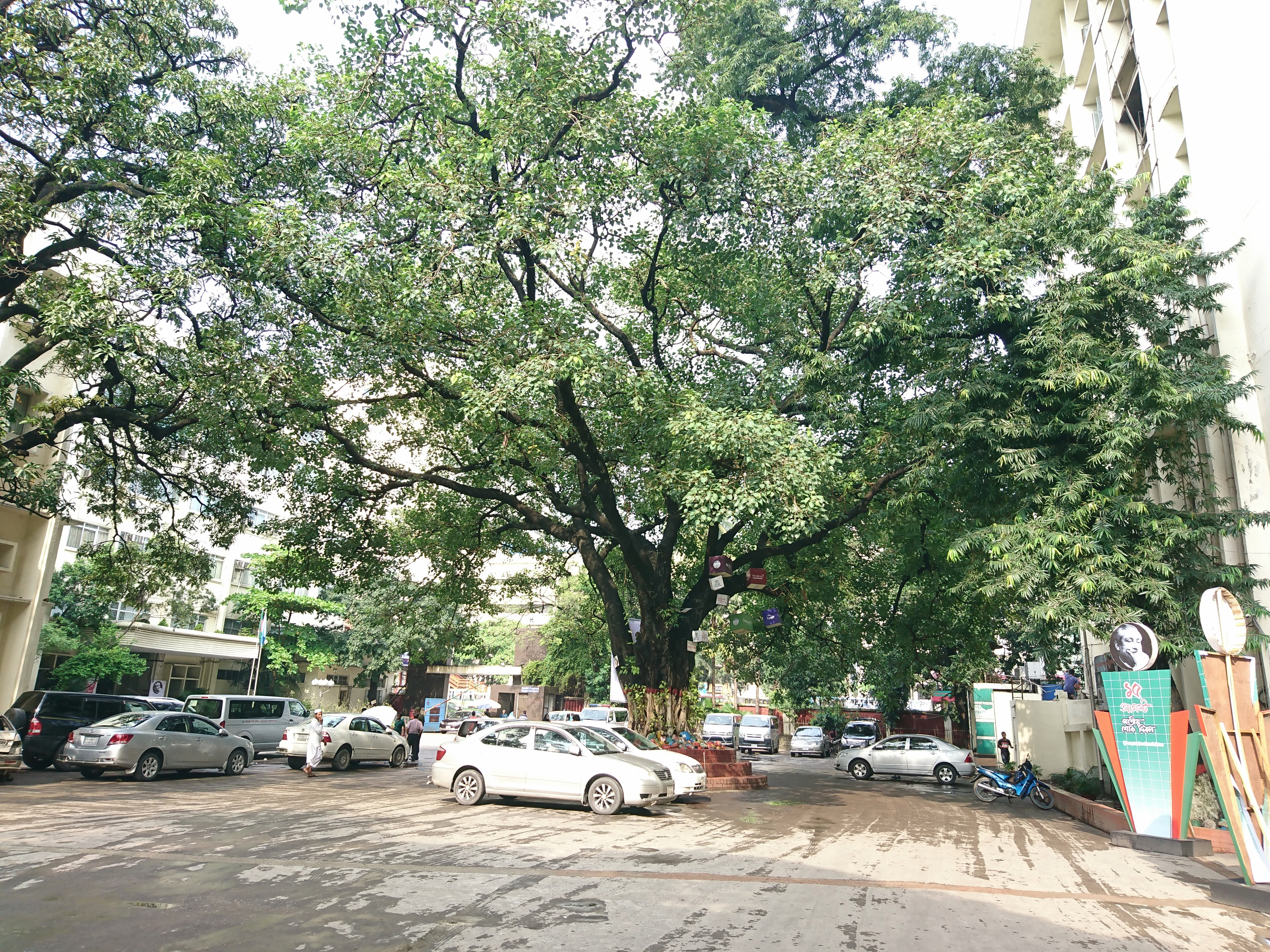
Sacred fig tree at BMU campus.

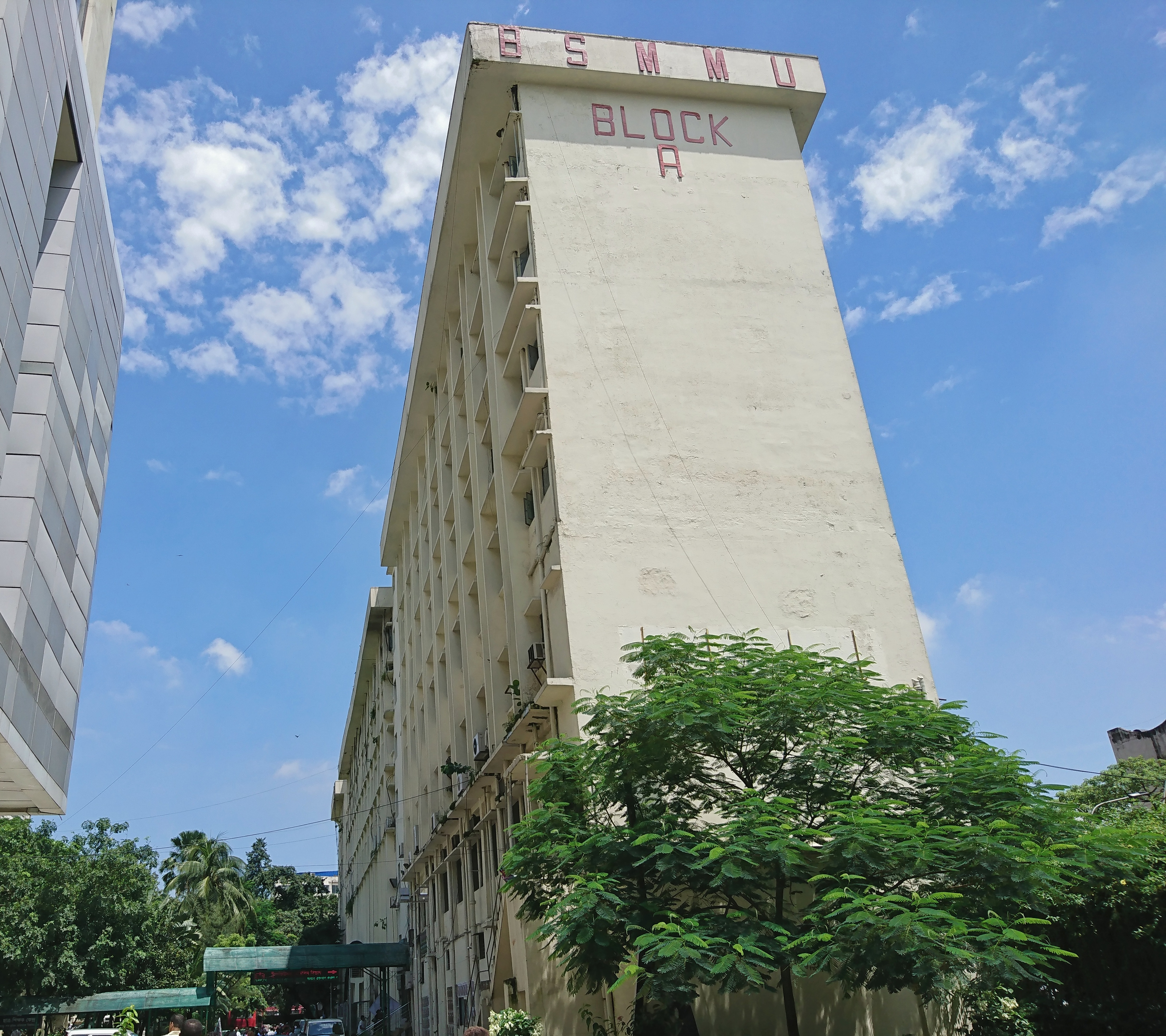
A block BMU.

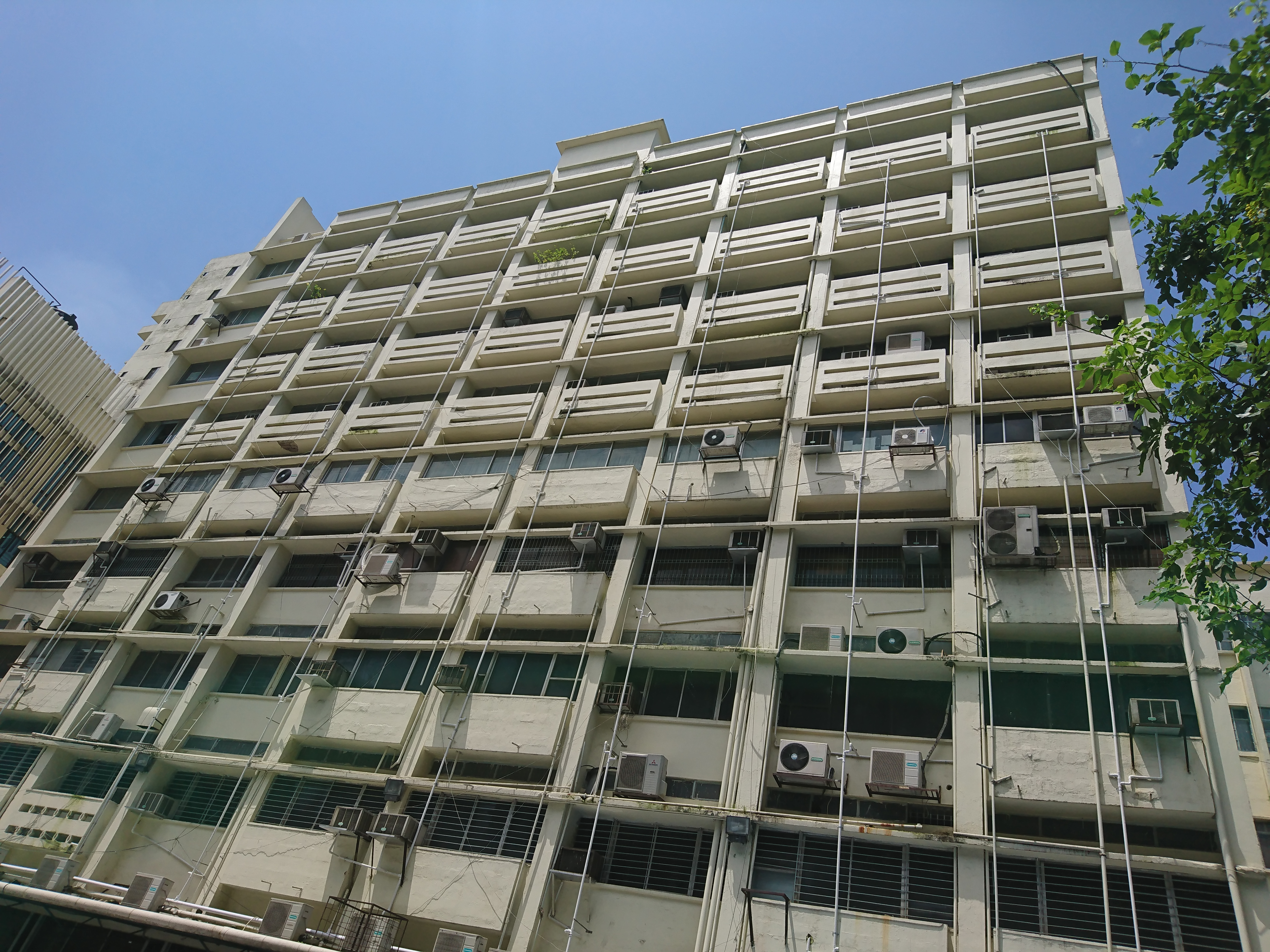
Faculty of Basic Science and Para Clinical Science

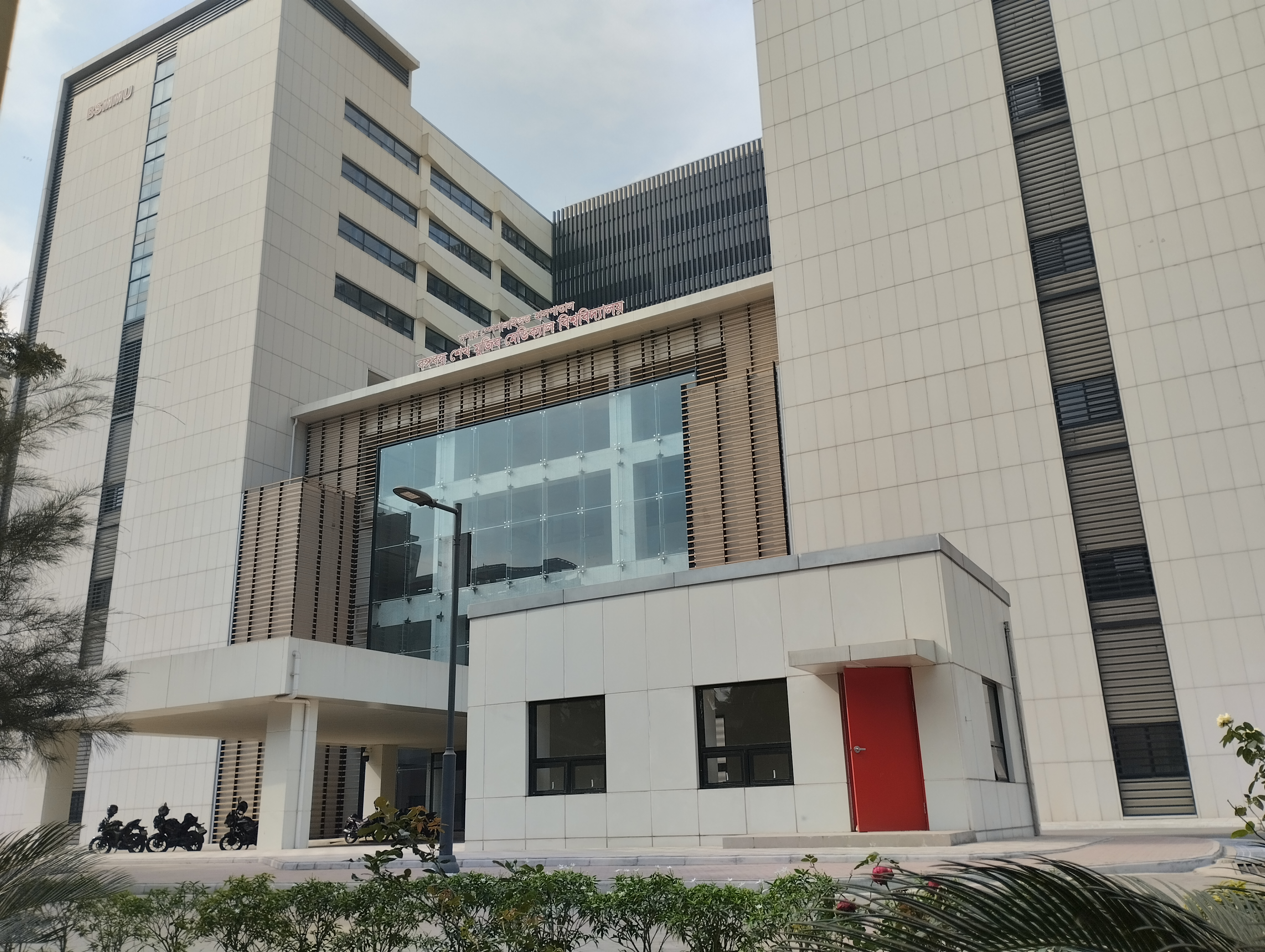
Super specialized hospital, BMU

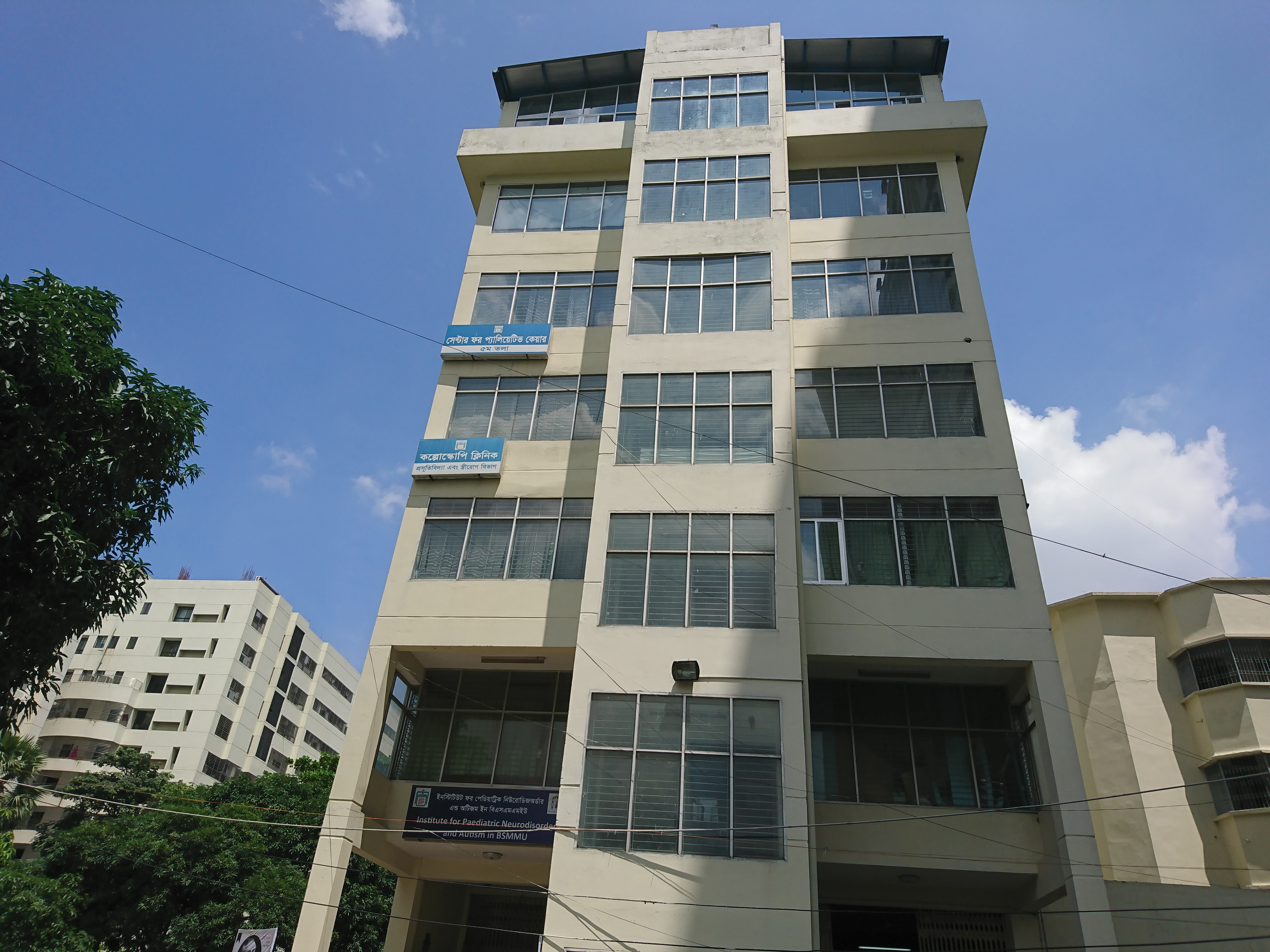
E block BMU.

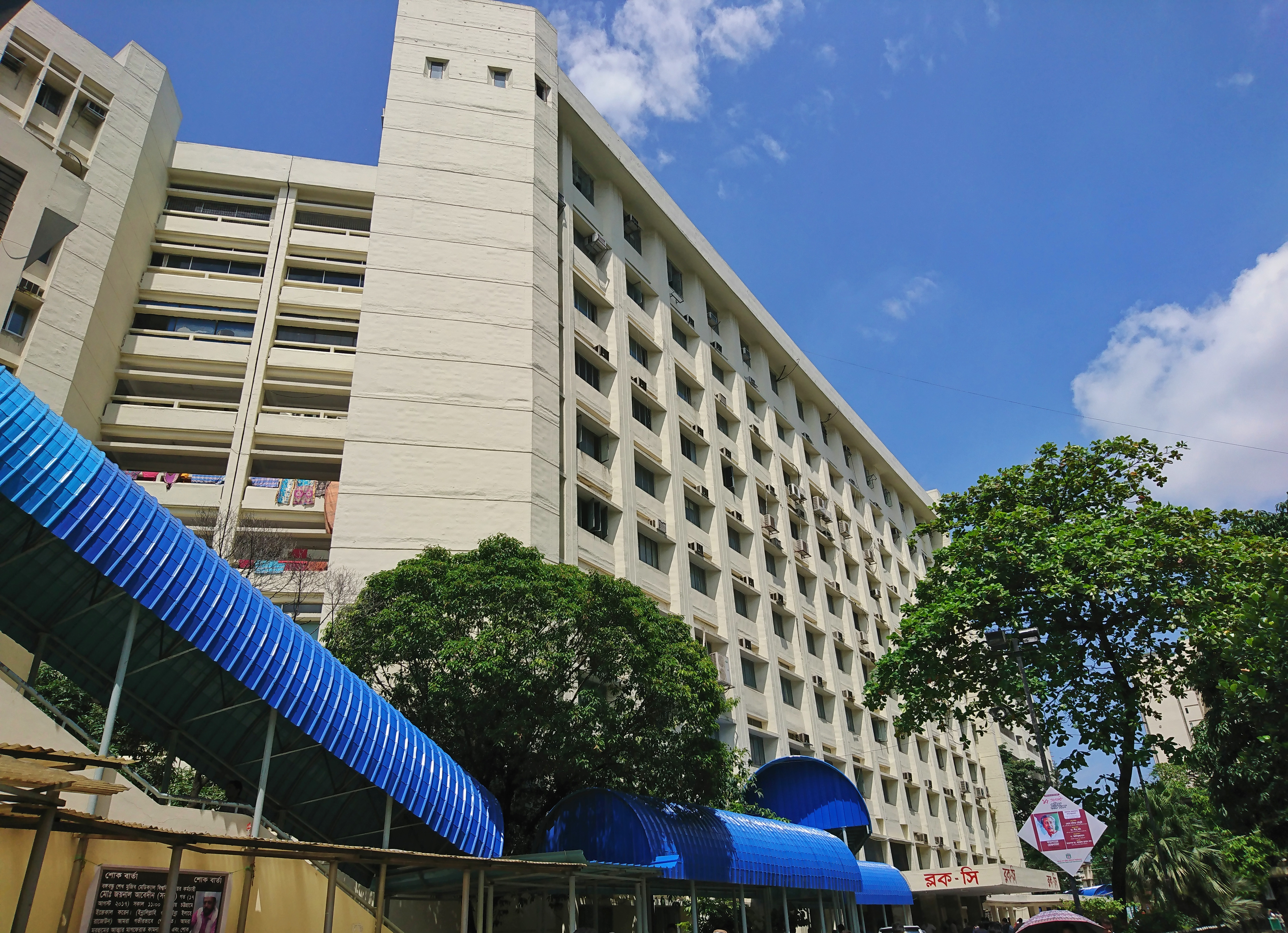
C block BMU.

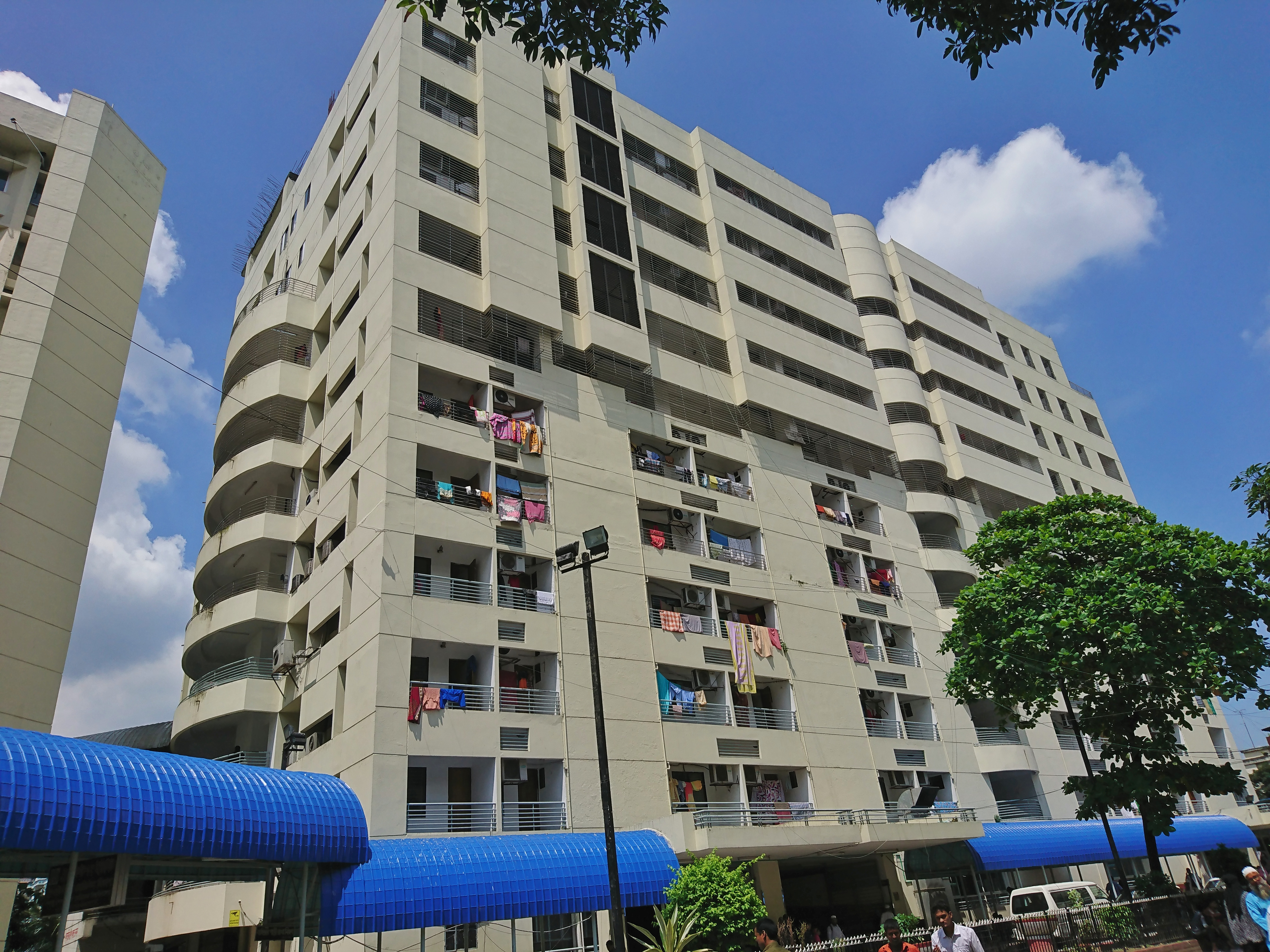
Cabin block BMU.

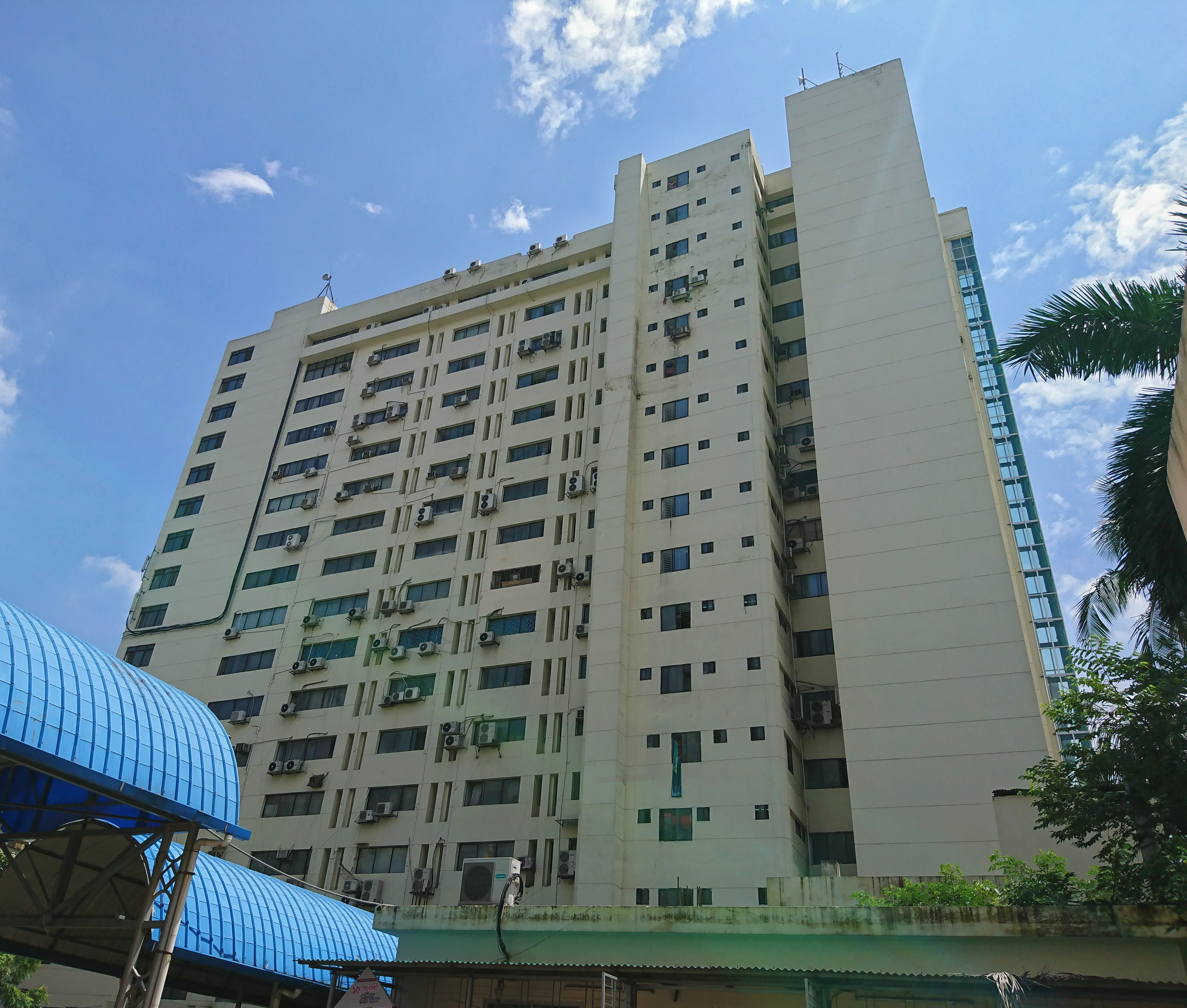
D block BMU.

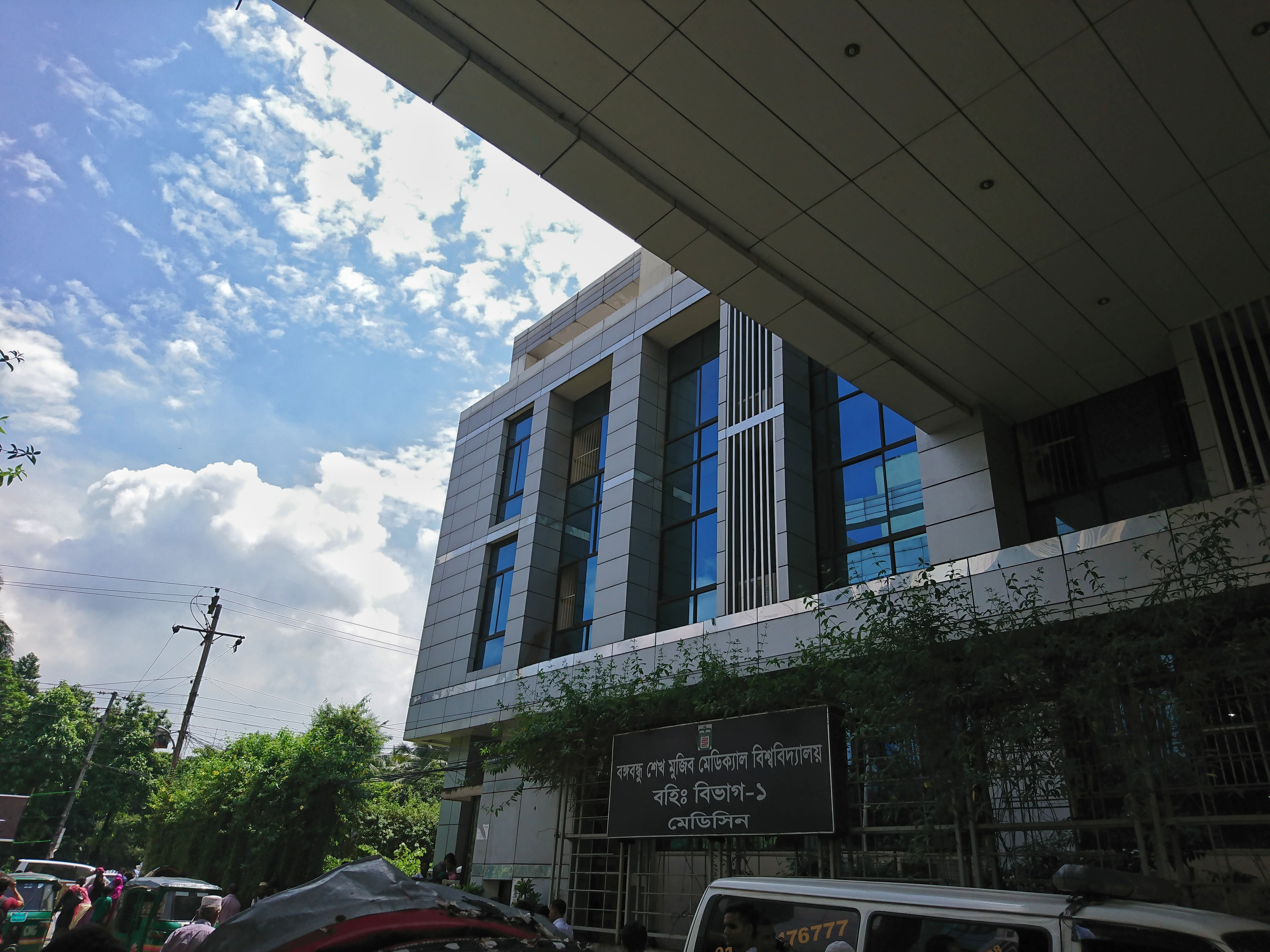
OPD 1 BMU.

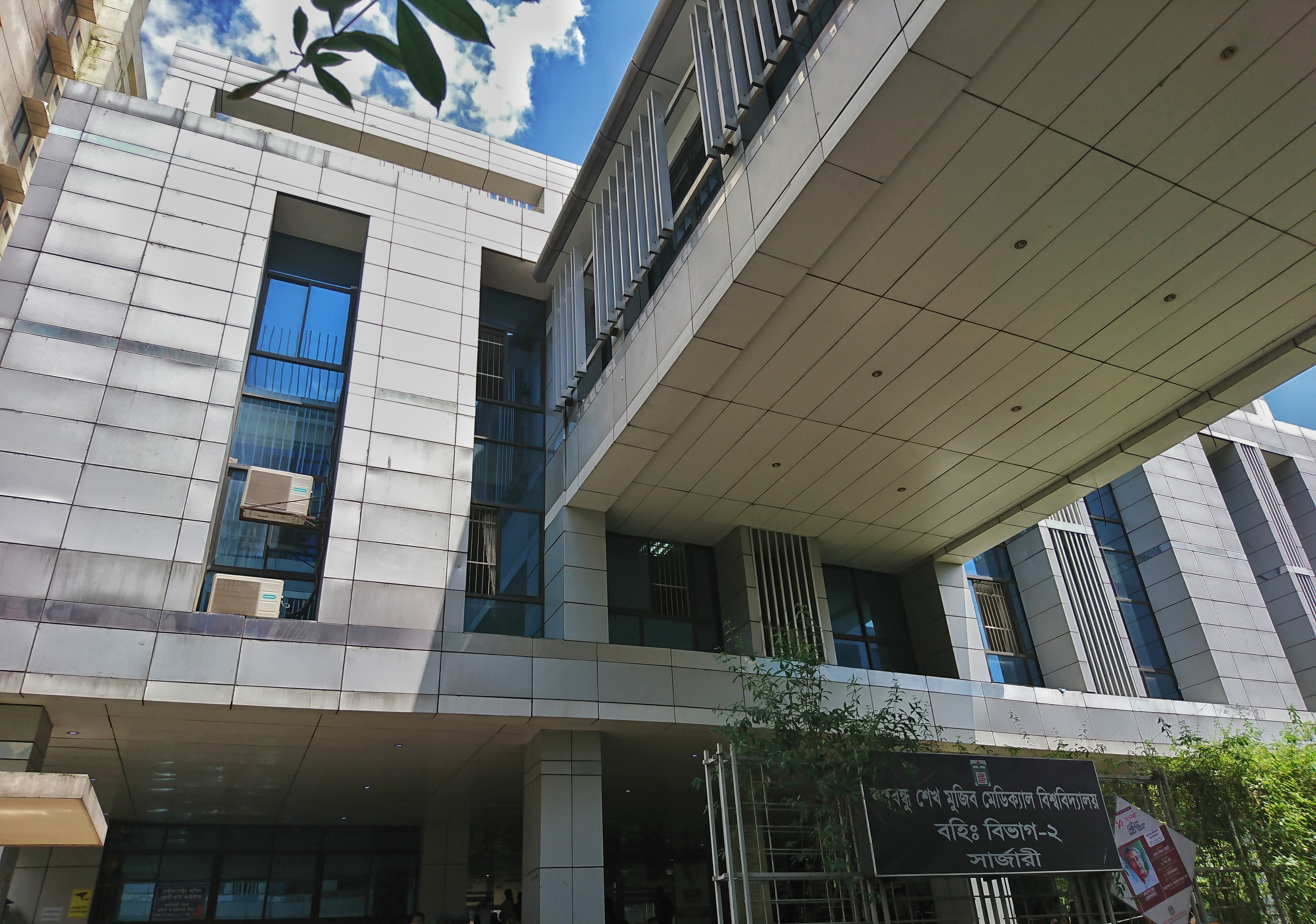
OPD 2 BMU.

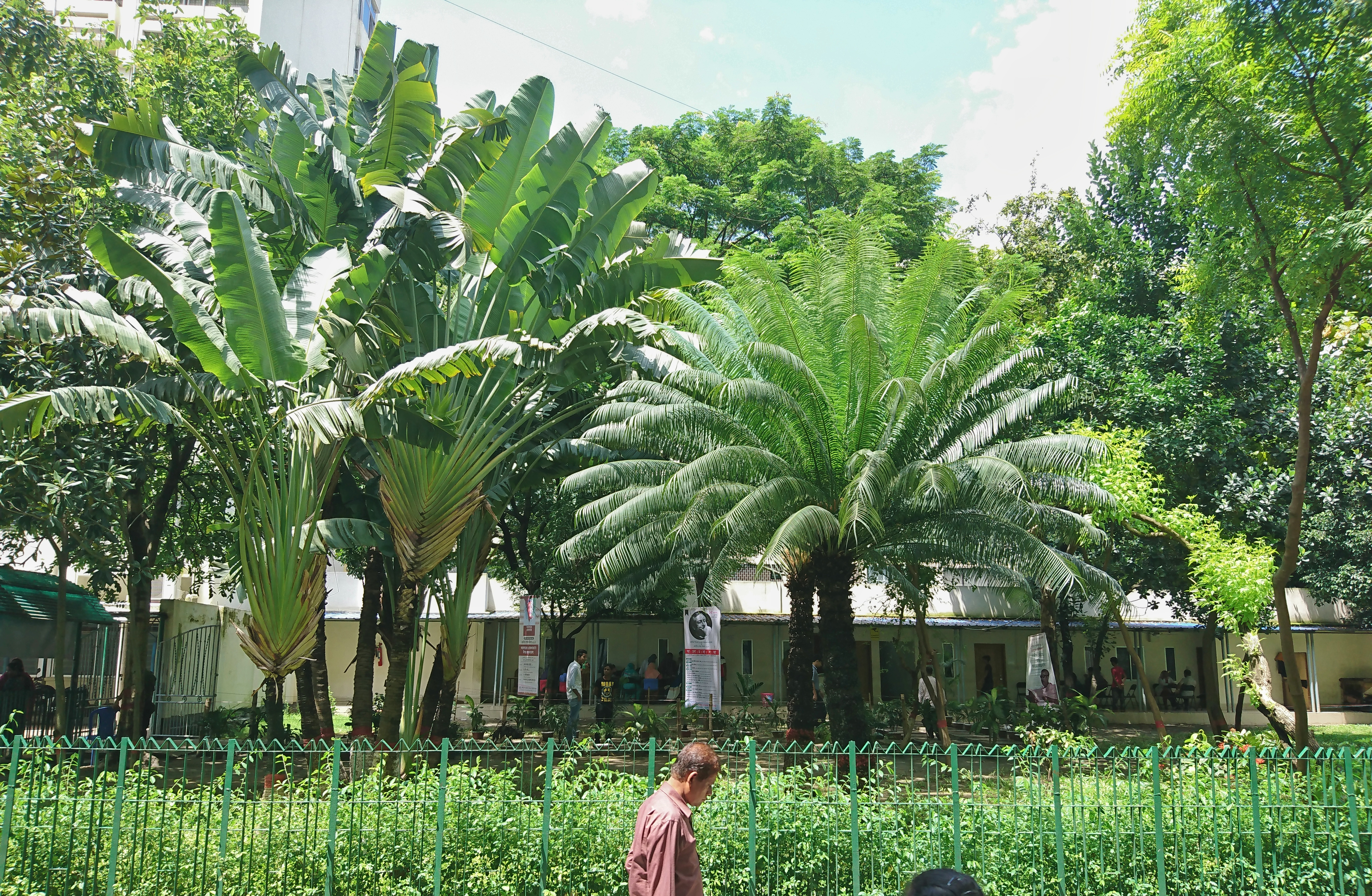
TSC of BMU.

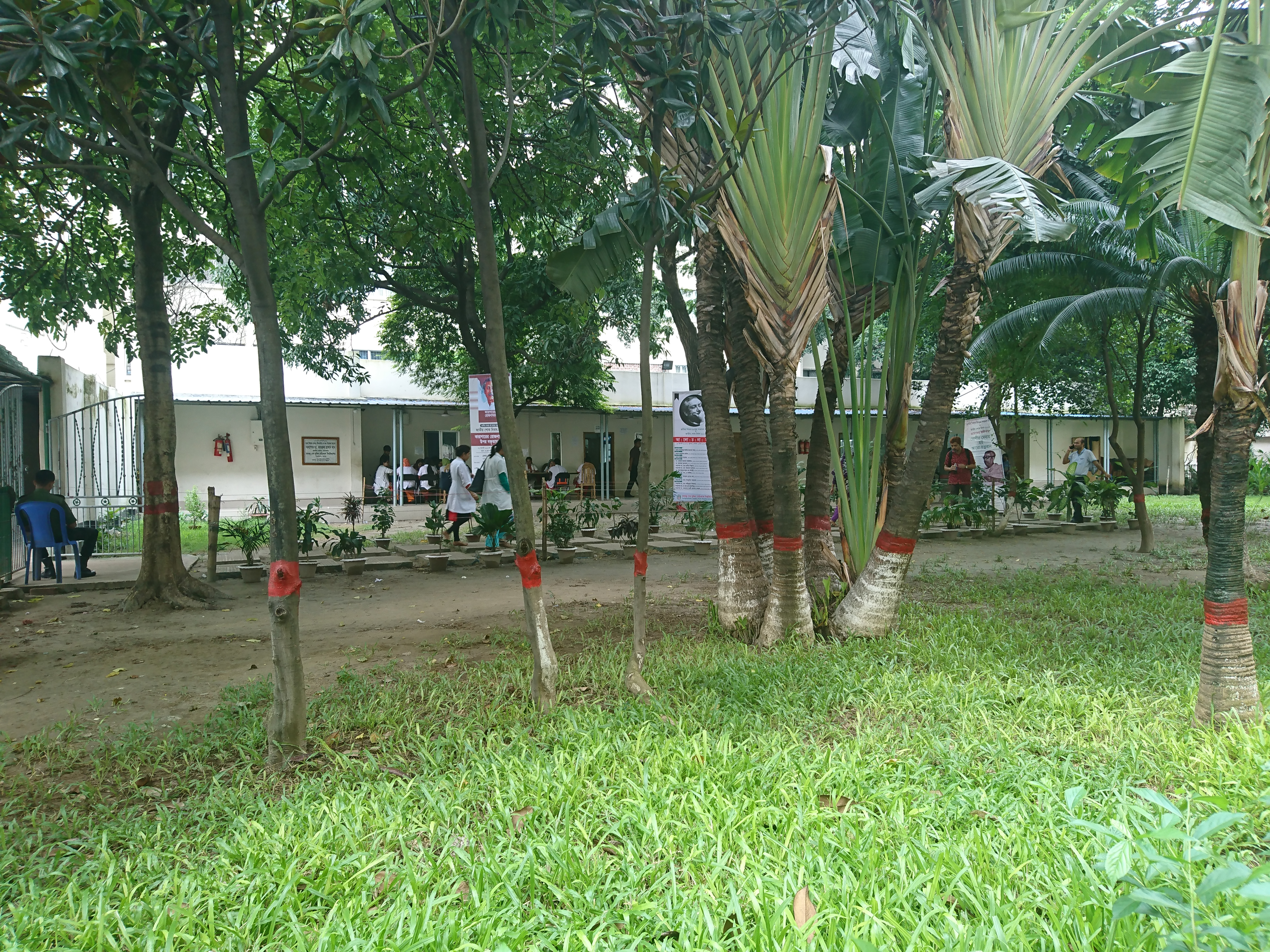
TSC of BMU.

== Notable alumni ==
- Lotay Tshering, former prime minister of Bhutan
- Nasima Akhter
- Ejajul Islam
- Atiqul Islam
- Zakia Sultana

== Notable faculty ==
- Mazhar Ali Qadri
- ABM Abdullah
- A. Z. M. Zahid Hossain
- Kanak Kanti Barua
- M Iqbal Arslan
- Syed Atiqul Haq
- A. K. M. Fazlul Haque
- Kamrul Hasan Khan
- Md Sayedur Rahman
- Md. Shahinul Alam
- Md. Sharfuddin Ahmed
- Pran Gopal Datta
- Mahmud Hassan
- Deen Mohammad Noorul Huq
