= National Institute of Advanced Nursing Education and Research =

Nursing Institute in Bangladesh

- Established: 2016
- Director: Hamima Umme Morsheda
- Location: Mugda, Dhaka
- Website: nianer.edu.bd

The National Institute of Advanced Nursing Education and Research (NIANER) (Bengali: জাতীয় নার্সিং উচ্চ শিক্ষা ও গবেষণা প্রতিষ্ঠান) is the only higher education and research center for nursing in Bangladesh.

== History ==
NIANER was initiated by the Prime Minister of Bangladesh during her visit to South Korea in May 2010. 'Establishment of National Institute of Advanced Nursing Education and Research' was launched in 2013 by the Korea International Cooperation Agency(KOICA) and Younsei University College of Nursing in partnership with the Bangladesh government. Bangladesh's prime minister Sheikh Hasina inaugurated the institute on 12 May 2018.

== Organogram ==
The director is the head of the institute. Three deputy-directors assist in administration, education and affiliated centres affairs. Hamima Umme Morsheda is serving as first director of NIANER.

NIANER is affiliated under Bangabandhu Sheikh Mujib Medical University.
