= National Institute of Preventive and Social Medicine =

Research institute in Bangladesh

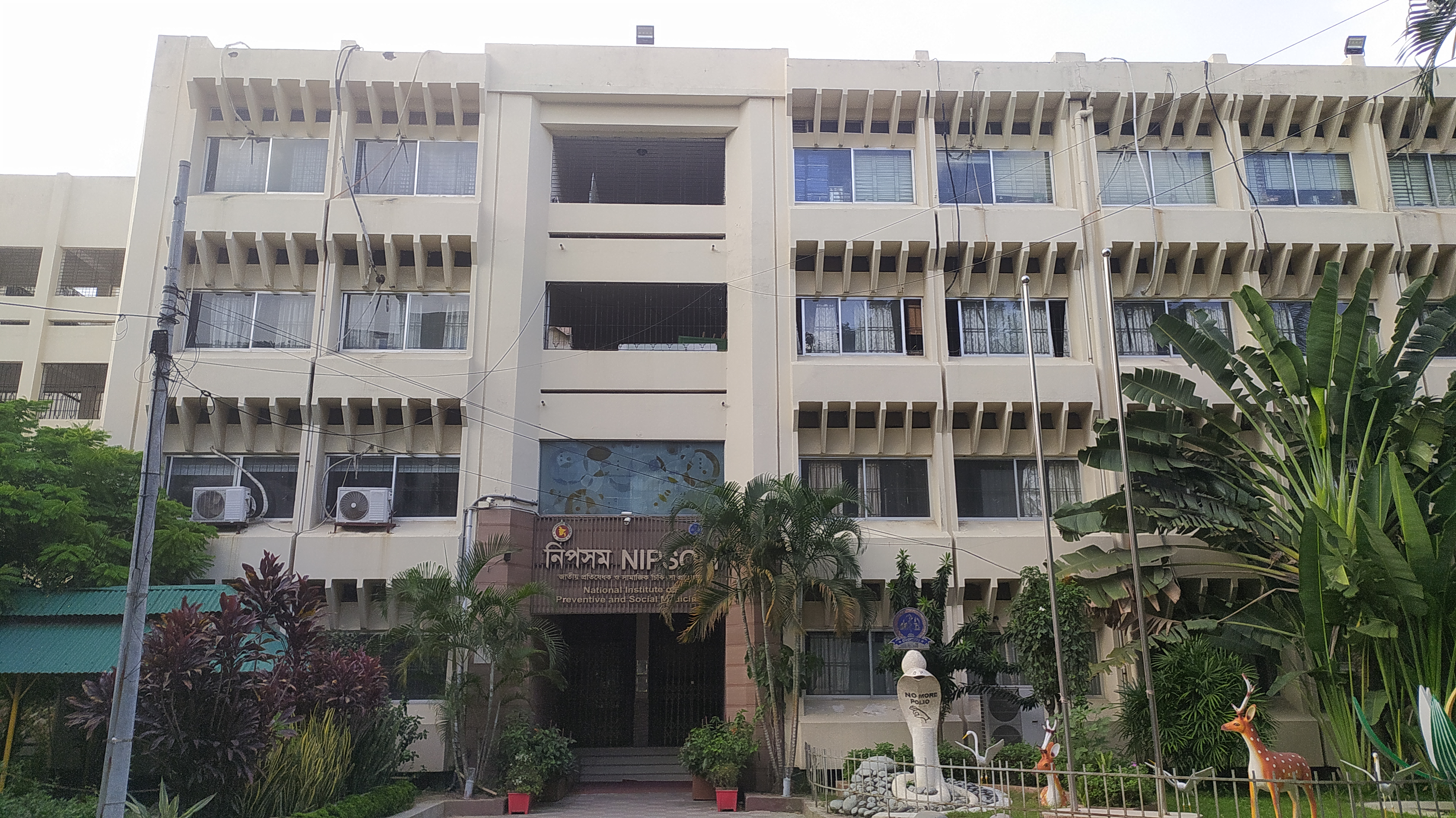
- Formation: 1974
- Headquarters: Dhaka, Bangladesh
- Region served: Bangladesh
- Official language: Bengali
- Website: nipsom.gov.bd

The National Institute of Preventive and Social Medicine or NIPSOM is a national public health institute in Dhaka.

== History ==
The National Institute of Preventive and Social Medicine was established in 1974 under the Ministry of Health and Family Welfare. It offers Master of Public Health and Master of Philosophy degrees. In 1978, it received accreditation from the University of California and in 1982 from the University of Liverpool. In 1990, it joined the School of Public Health Association and the Asia Pacific Academic Consortium for Public Health. In 1999 it became affiliated with the Faculty of Medical and Social Sciences at the Bangladesh Medical University.
