= A. K. M. Fazlul Haque (surgeon) =

Bangladeshi surgeon

- একেএম ফজলুল হক
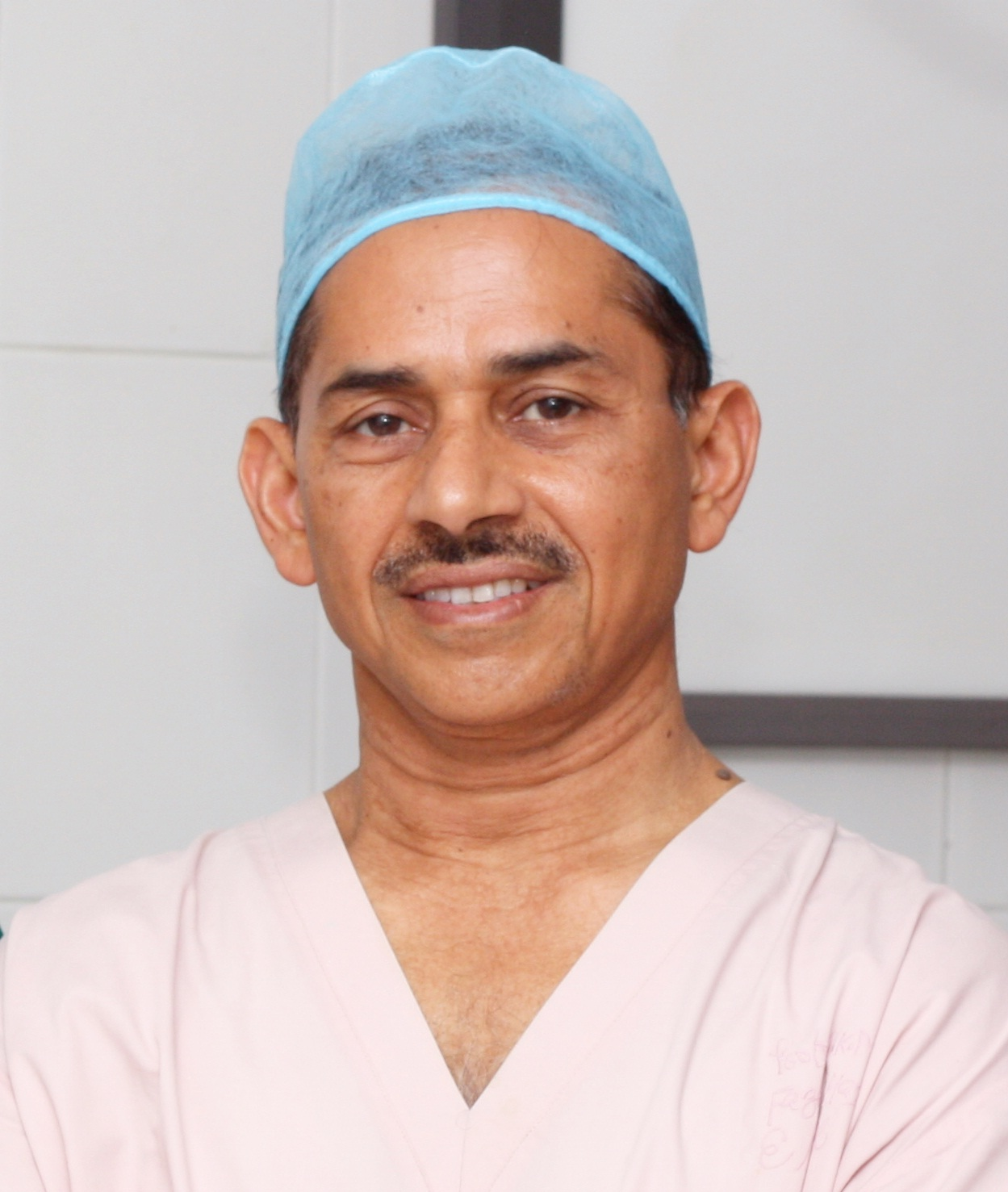
- Haque in 2016
- Born: 25 January 1958 (age 68); Patuakhali, Bangladesh
- Education: MBBS, Master of Surgery, Dhaka Medical College and Hospital
- Occupation: Colorectal surgeon
- Spouse: Shahin Mahbuba Haque
- Children: 2
- Website: www.profdrakmfazlulhaque.com

A. K. M. Fazlul Haque (born 25 January 1958) is a Bangladeshi surgeon. He was the founder of the Department of Colorectal Surgery in Bangladesh Medical University (BMU) in Dhaka.

== Early life and education ==
Haque was born on 25 January in 1958 in Gazipura village in Patuakhali district in what was then Pakistan. His father is Rashid Ahmed.

Haque passed Secondary School Certificate (SSC) from Jessore board at 1972. In 1974, he completed Higher Secondary School Certificate (HSC). In 1982, he completed his M.B.B.S degree from Dhaka Medical College. He was awarded Fellowship (FCPS) from Bangladesh College of Physicians and Surgeons in January 1989.

== Contributions ==
Haque is the founder chairman of colorectal surgery in Bangabandhu Sheikh Mujib Medical University. It may be specially mentioned that Professor Haque is the pioneer in colorectal Surgery in Bangladesh and the Subcontinent. He successfully initiated various modern surgeries of colon and rectum. Such as double stapling of rectum cancer, Longo operation for Haemorrhoid and successful operation of fistula after having frequent unsuccessful operations. Professor Haque popularised the idea of treating 70-80% of Haemorrhoid patients with the non-operation procedure such as Rubber Ring Ligation. He has taken the initiative to observe "World Piles & Colorectal Cancer Day" on 20 November in Bangladesh and internationally to increase public awareness. In 2006 he started "MS degree" in colorectal surgery in Bangabandhu Sheikh Mujib Medical University (BSMMU). He has been practising the colorectal surgery for many years.

Haque is the first in the history of Bangladesh who directed international training course for senior foreign specialists in May 2008. Surgeons from Sri Lanka, Nepal, India and Maldives attended the international training program "Titled: Master program in MIPH". In this program, he trained them practically how to perform Longo operation skillfully without any trauma to the anal canal exterior.

== Membership ==
- Member, American Society of Colon & Rectal Surgeons
- Member, Endoscopic & Laparoscopic Surgeons of Asia, ELSA, SINGAPORE
- Life Member, Bangladesh College of Physicians & Surgeons
- Life Member, Society of Surgeons of Bangladesh
- Life Member, Bangladesh Medical Association

== Books and publications ==
Haque has written a book on colorectal surgery for public which is widely circulated. He has started few operations in Bangladesh for the first time namely Low anterior resection with double stapling, Longo operation and complex fistula operation with seton technique.

== Personal life ==
Haque's wife Shahin Mahbuba Haque is a professor of English. In addition to that, she is a singer as well as English news presenter of Bangladesh Television. His eldest son Asif Almas Haque completed MBBS (SSMC), MRCS (ENG), FCPS (Surgery), FRCS (ENG), Fellow of American College of Surgeons (FACS), Fellow of American Society of Colon & Rectal Surgeons (FASCRS). His younger son Sakib Sarwat Haque completed MBBS (BMC).
