= F. M. Siddiqui =

Bangladeshi physician and academic

Vice-chancellor of Bangladesh Medical University
- Incumbent
- Assumed office 9 March 2026
- Preceded by: Md. Shahinul Alam

Personal details
- Education: Sher-e-Bangla Medical College (MBBS)

F. M. Siddiqui is a Bangladeshi physician and academic. He is the incumbent the vice-chancellor of Bangladesh Medical University (BMU).
