= Kanak Kanti Barua =

Bangladeshi neurosurgeon and Vice-chancellor (born 1953)

- কনক কান্তি বড়ুয়া

Vice Chancellor

Bangabandhu Sheikh Mujib Medical University
- In office 24 March 2018 – 23 March 2021
- Appointed by: President of Bangladesh
- Preceded by: Kamrul Hasan Khan
- Succeeded by: Muhammad Rafiqul Alam (In-charge); Md. Sharfuddin Ahmed

President

Bangladesh College of Physicians and Surgeons
- In office 2017–2019
- Preceded by: Md. Sanowar Hossain
- Succeeded by: Quazi Deen Mohammad

Personal details
- Born: 1953 (age 72–73)
- Education: Dhaka College; Dhaka Medical College; Kobe University

Kanak Kanti Barua is a Bangladeshi neurosurgeon and academic. He served as the 10th vice chancellor of Bangabandhu Sheikh Mujib Medical University (BSMMU).

== Early life and education ==
Barua was born in 1953. He completed his Secondary School Certificate from the Cumilla Board of Intermediate and Secondary Education in 1968 and Higher Secondary Certificate from Dhaka College under the Dhaka board in 1970. He passed his MBBS from Dhaka Medical College in 1977. He obtained FCPS from Bangladesh College of Physicians and Surgeons in 1990. He earned an MS in neurosurgery from the University of Dhaka in 2003 and a Ph.D. in 2004 from Kobe University.

== Career ==
Barua joined the then IPGMR (now Bangabandhu Sheikh Mujib Medical University) in 1979. He served as chairman of the Department of Neurosurgery and also as the dean of the Faculty of Surgery at this university. He was appointed as 10th vice chancellor of BSMMU in March 2018. He also served as president of the Bangladesh College of Physicians and Surgeons (BCPS) from 2017 to 2019. Barua also served as senior vice-president of BCPS from 2015 to 2017 and was honorary secretary from 2009 to 2015 for consecutive three terms. He also served as a syndicate member of Bangabandhu Sheikh Mujib Medical University from 2010 to 2018 and also Chattogram Medical University and Rajshahi Medical University at different times. He is currently working with the designation of vice-chancellor, professor, and head of the Neurosurgery Department at Bangabandhu Sheikh Mujib Medical University.

== Publications ==
Barua published more than 122 papers in different national and international reputed journals.

== Affiliations with professional organisations ==
Barua served as president of the Bangladesh Society of Neurosurgeons (BSNS) for five terms and was also the founder secretary general of the society. He also worked as vice-president of the Asian Congress of Neurological Surgeons from 1997 to 2004 and was secretary of the congress in 2000–2002. He was the president of the SAARC Society of Neurosurgeons.

== Awards and recognition ==
Barua was awarded the fellowship of the International College of Surgeons from the US in 1993. He was awarded an honorary FSLCS from the Sri Lanka College of Surgeons, Sri Lanka and an honorary FCPS from the College of Physicians and Surgeons Pakistan in 2012. He received the Professor PS Ramani lifetime achievement award in 2019. He was awarded by the BMA North American Chapter at New Orleans on 26 July 2018 for outstanding performance and service in the field of Neurosurgery. Barua received Atish Dipankar Peace Gold Medal in 2018. He was also awarded U Gun Meju-Krinshna Chandra Choudhury Sharnapadak in 2019. Barua was conferred Shadhinata Padak (Independence Award), the highest civil award of Bangladesh in 2022.
