= Md Sayedur Rahman =

Bangladeshi physician and academic

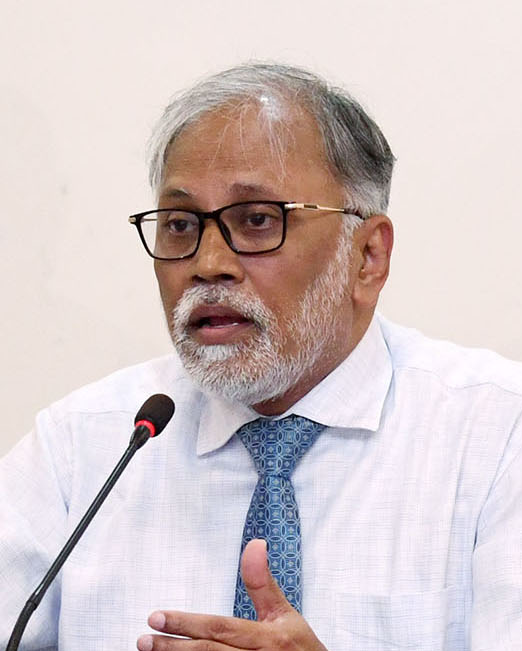
- Rahman in 2025

Special Assistant to the Chief Adviser for Ministry of Health and Family Welfare
- In office 10 November 2024 – 17 February 2026
- Chief Adviser: Muhammad Yunus

Vice-chancellor of Bangladesh Medical University
- In office 28 August 2024 – 4 December 2024
- Preceded by: Deen Mohammad Noorul Huq
- Succeeded by: Md. Shahinul Alam

Personal details
- Education: Chittagong Medical College

Md Sayedur Rahman is a Bangladeshi physician and former vice-chancellor of Bangladesh Medical University. In November 2024, he became the special assistant (status equivalent to a minister of state) to the chief adviser of the Interim government of Bangladesh. He was given executive power over the Ministry of Health and Family Welfare. Prior to this appointment, he served as the chairman of the Department of Pharmacology at BSMMU.

== Education ==
He completed his Higher Secondary Certificate (HSC) from Notre Dame College, Dhaka and MBBS from Chittagong Medical College.
