= Syed Atiqul Haq =

Syed Atiqul Haq is a Bangladeshi physician and academic. He has served as the current president of Asia Pacific League of Associations for Rheumatology for 2018–2020 tenure. He is the founding chairman of department of rheumatology in Bangabandhu Sheikh Mujib Medical University, Dhaka.

== Life and education ==
Haq was born in Chittagong, Bangladesh. He passed MBBS from Chittagong Medical College. He then completed the FCPS (Medicine) degree from Bangladesh College of Physicians and Surgeons. He was awarded Fellowship of the Royal College of Physicians of Edinburgh in 2003 and International Fellowship of the American College of Rheumatology in 2005. He currently works as a Rheumatology & Medicine Specialist at Bangabandhu Sheikh Mujib Medical University.

== Achievements ==
Haq was the head of the department of medicine from 2009 to 2012 at Bangabandhu Sheikh Mujib Medical University, Dhaka. He has edited several international journals on rheumatology. The veteran physician is a former president of the Association of Physician Bangladesh. He was accorded a gold medal from the Bangladesh Academy of Science for his contribution in medical science in 1997.
