= Bangladesh College of Physicians and Surgeons =

Postgraduate medical college and professional membership body in Bangladesh

Coordinates: 23.7775°N 90.3988°E

Bangladesh College of Physicians & Surgeons
- বাংলাদেশ কলেজ অব ফিজিশিয়ানস্ এন্ড সার্জনস্
- Logo of Bangladesh College of Physicians & Surgeons
- Other name: BCPS
- Type: Professional membership body
- Established: 6 June 1972; 54 years ago
- President: Moudud Hossain Alamgir
- Secretary: Feroze Quader
- Location: 67, Shaheed Tajuddin Ahmed Avenue, Mohakhali, Dhaka, Bangladesh
- Website: bcps.edu.bd

The Bangladesh College of Physicians & Surgeons (BCPS) is a statutory professional membership body in Bangladesh dedicated to improving the practice of medicine and surgery, chiefly through accreditation of doctors by examination. It organizes examinations for Fellowship (FCPS) and Membership (MCPS).

== History ==
This institution was established in 1972, by the Bangladesh College of Physicians and Surgeons Order 1972, an ordinance issued by the President of Bangladesh.

It offers certifications following postgraduate training in specialties of medicine, surgery and dentistry.

== Qualifications award ==
- Fellow of Bangladesh College of Physicians & Surgeons (FCPS)
- Member of Bangladesh College of Physicians & Surgeons (MCPS)

== Publication ==
The Journal of Bangladesh College of Physicians & Surgeons (ISSN 1015-0870) is the official journal of BCPS.

== Notable fellows ==
More than 7,000 medical doctors have been named as Fellows of the Bangladesh College of Physicians and Surgeons, since its inception in 1972. Notable fellows of BCPS include:

- Lotay Tshering
- Sayeba Akhter
- Abul Bashar Mohammed Khurshid Alam
- Kanak Kanti Barua
- Pranab Kumar Chowdhury
- Syed Atiqul Haq
- A. K. M. Fazlul Haque
- Mahmud Hasan
- Quazi Deen Mohammad
- Quazi Tarikul Islam
- ARM Luthful Kabir
- Touhidul Anowar Chawdhury
- Deen Mohammad Noorul Huq
