= National Institute of Traumatology and Orthopedic Rehabilitation =

Teaching hospital in Dhaka, Bangladesh

Coordinates: 23°43′32″N 90°23′53″E

National Institute of Traumatology & Orthopaedic Rehabilitation (NITOR)
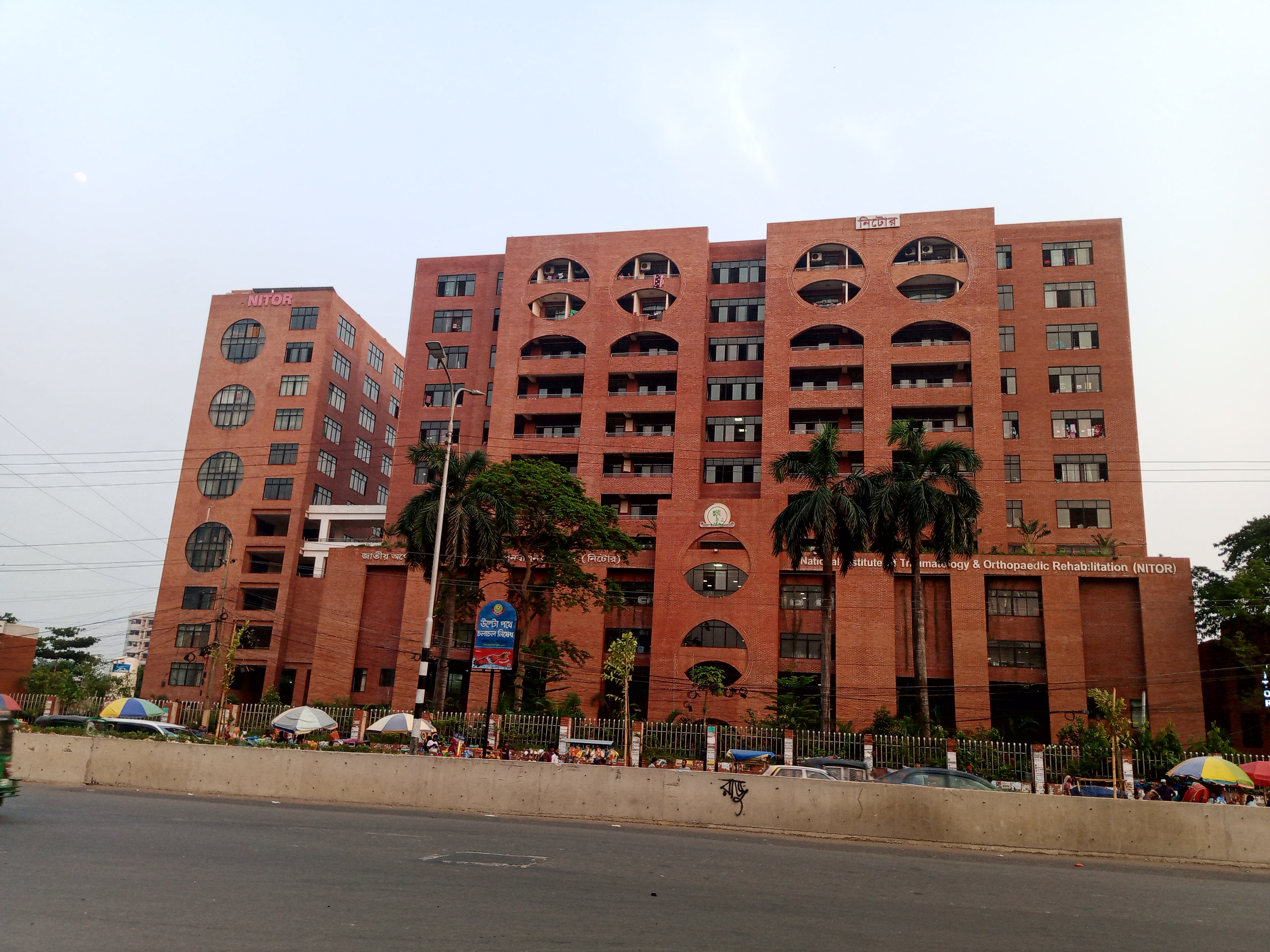
- National Institute of Traumatology & Orthopaedic Rehabilitation (NITOR) Premise of National Institute of Traumatology & Orthopaedic Rehabilitation (NITOR)
- Established: 1972
- Location: Sher-e-Bangla Nagor, Dhaka-1207, Bangladesh
- Type: Orthopedics & Rehabilitation Institute
- Total Bed: 1000
- Director: Md. Abul kenan
- Nick Name: NITOR
- Previous name: Rehabilitation Institute and Hospital for the Disabled (RIHD)
- Academic affiliation: University of Dhaka, Bangabandhu Sheikh Mujib Medical University

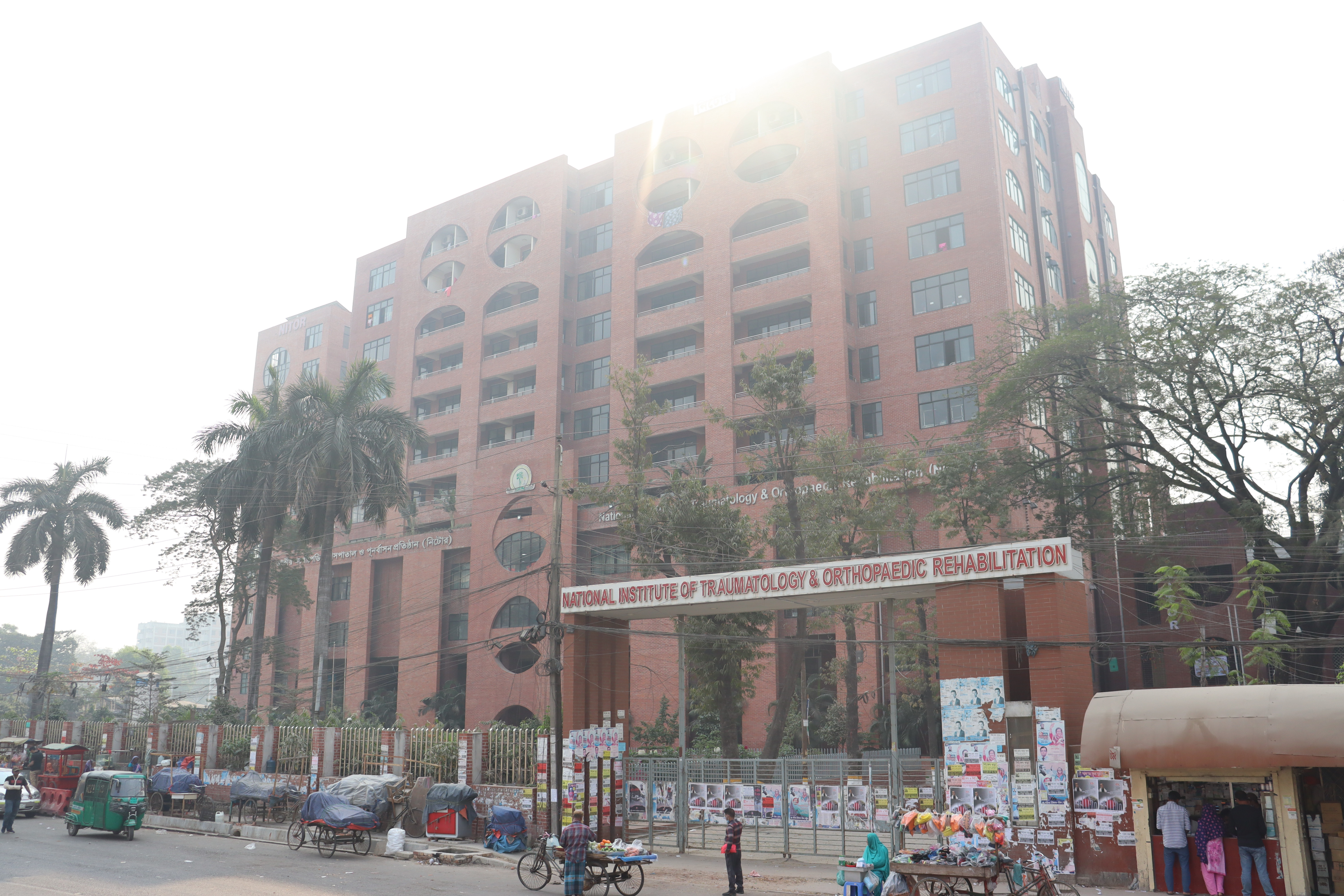
National Institute of Traumatology and Orthopaedic Rehabilitation (NITOR)

The National Institute of Traumatology & Orthopaedic Rehabilitation (NITOR) is an orthopedic hospital and undergraduate and post-graduate institute in Sher-e-Bangla Nagar, Dhaka, Bangladesh. It was established in 1972 by the Government of Bangladesh as the Shaheed Suhrawardy Hospital. The original planning and construction began in the late 1960s but was interrupted by the Bangladesh Liberation War in 1971. In October 2002 the name of the institute was changed to National Institute of Traumatology & Orthopaedic Rehabilitation (NITOR). NITOR is affiliated to the University of Dhaka and to Bangabandhu Sheikh Mujib Medical University.

Master of Surgery (MS) (Orthopedics) and Diploma in Orthopedics (D.O) are awarded by NITOR, a post-graduate institute, are recognized by the Bangladesh Medical and Dental Council. It also awards Bachelor of science in Physiotherapy (BPT), a course of 4 years academic under the medicine faculty of The University of Dhaka and 1 year internship.
