= National Institute of Ophthalmology and Hospital =

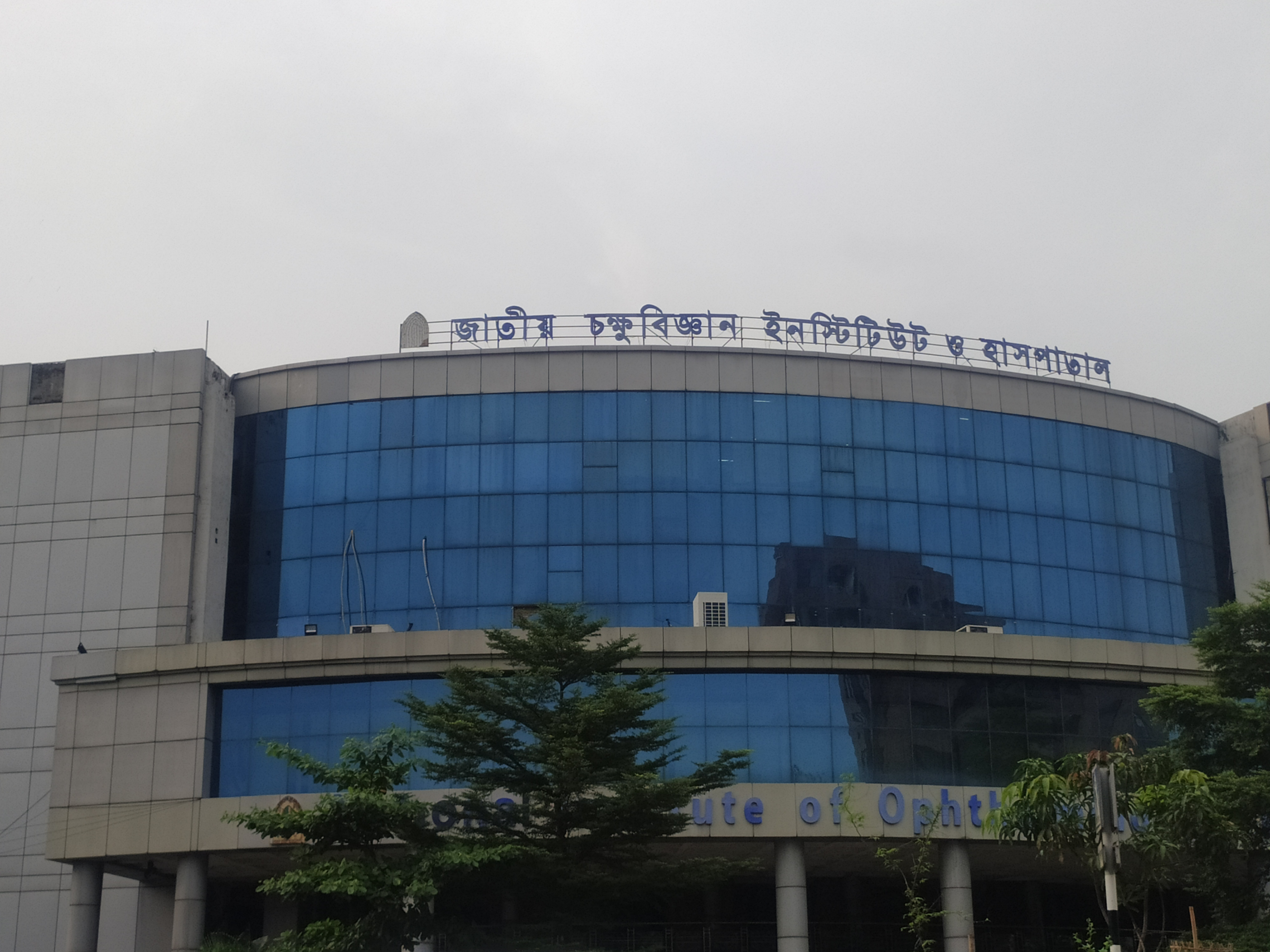

Geography
- Location: Sher E Bangla Nagar, Dhaka- 1207

National Institute of Ophthalmology and Hospital (Bengali: জাতীয় চক্ষু বিজ্ঞান ইন্সটিটিউট ও হাসপাতাল), also known as the National Eye Hospital, is a government eye hospital in Bangladesh that provides all types of eye care.

== History ==
The National Institute of Ophthalmology and Hospital is the apex institute of ophthalmology in the country, established in 1978 and expanded to 250 beds in 2006.

In 2014, Mohammed Nasim, minister of health, expressed annoyance with the Dhaka North City Corporation for opening a cattle market near the hospital.

Prime Minister Sheikh Hasina is a patient at the National Institute of Ophthalmology and Hospital and has received treatment at the Institute for years.

In late May 2025, operations at the National Institute of Ophthalmology and Hospital (NIOH) in Dhaka were suspended following a clash between hospital staff and patients injured in the July uprising. The hospital has remained closed for at least four consecutive days, including its emergency services, due to ongoing security concerns, with no confirmed reopening date. Authorities from the Ministry of Health have advised patients to seek care at nearby facilities, while a government delegation works to mediate the situation and restore a safe environment for the resumption of services.
