= Mahmud Hassan =

Mahmud Hasan
- Awards: Ekushey Padak

Mahmud Hasan is a Bangladeshi physician. He was awarded Ekushey Padak by the government of Bangladesh in the category of social welfare in 2017. He was the president of Bangladesh College of Physicians and Surgeons for two years from 2011 to 2013. He was also elected President of Bangladesh Medical Association twice.
