= Faridpur Medical College =

Bangladeshi medical school

- ফরিদপুর মেডিকেল কলেজ
- Former name: Bangabandhu Sheikh Mujib Medical College
- Motto: Learn to Serve the Humanity
- Type: Public Medical College
- Established: 1992
- Academic affiliations: University of Dhaka
- Principal: Dr. Dilruba Zeba
- Director: Saifur Rahman
- Students: 900
- Location: Faridpur, Faridpur District, Bangladesh; 23.6080°N 89.8410°E
- Campus: Urban
- Language: English

Faridpur Medical College (Bengali: ফরিদপুর মেডিকেল কলেজ), is a public medical college located in Faridpur, Bangladesh. It is affiliated with the University of Dhaka as a constituent medical college.

== History ==
The government of Bangladesh established Faridpur Medical College in 1992. Since 1992 after establishment, it has been offering the height standard of medical teaching to enable its students to be competent to serve the humanity. Then to now, this college has got a huge preference in the public medical college Sector in Bangladesh. The institute started its journey on the campus of Medical Assistant Training School, Faridpur. In 2017, the college was shifted to the newly constructed campus in West Khabashpur, Faridpur.

In 2011, the management of the college resolved to rename it Sheikh Hasina Medical College. In 2014, it was reported that Sheikh Hasina vetoed the name change.

Students at the college demonstrated in 2015, calling for the reinstatement of the "carry on" examination system. The Bachelor of Medicine, Bachelor of Surgery (MBBS) degree programme is divided into four parts by the first, second, third, and final professional examinations. If a student fails one of these exams, they may sit it again six months later. Under the 2002 "carry on" system, students could continue taking classes in the next academic session while preparing to retake an exam. This system was strongly favoured by medical students, but strongly opposed by their teachers. The Bangladesh Medical and Dental Council eliminated "carry on" in 2013, after which students who failed a professional exam were not allowed to continue classes until they had passed it, causing them to lose up to a year in the process. In April 2021, The government has changed the names of Faridpur Medical College and Faridpur Medical College Hospital to Bangabandhu Sheikh Mujib Medical College and Bangabandhu Sheikh Mujib Medical College Hospital. The names have been changed after the father of the nation Bangabandhu Sheikh Mujibur Rahman."The order issued with the approval of the authority will be implemented immediately," says a Ministry of Health and Family Welfare gazette signed by Md Ali Noor, secretary of Medical Education & Family Welfare Division.

On 30 October 2024, the Ministry of Health and Family Welfare changed the name of the medical college to "Faridpur Medical College".

== Campus ==
The college is located in west Khabashpur with the 1000-beded hospital about 3 kilometres (1.9 mi) southwest, in the West Khabaspur neighbourhood.

== Administration & organizations ==
The college is affiliated with Dhaka University as a constituent college. The principal of the college is Md. Mustafizur Rahman. The vice-principal is Dilruba Zeba. The director of the hospital is Saiful Islam.

== Academics ==
The college offers a five-year course of study, approved by the Bangladesh Medical and Dental Council (BMDC), leading to a Bachelor of Medicine, Bachelor of Surgery (MBBS) degree from University of Dhaka. After passing the final professional examination, there is a compulsory one-year internship. The internship is a prerequisite for obtaining registration from the BMDC to practice medicine.

Admission for Bangladeshis to the MBBS programme at all medical colleges in Bangladesh (government and private) is conducted centrally by the Directorate General of Health Services (DGHS). It administers a written multiple choice question exam simultaneously throughout the country. Candidates are admitted based primarily on their score on this test, although grades at Secondary School Certificate (SSC) and Higher Secondary School Certificate (HSC) level also play a part. Admission for foreign students is based on their SSC and HSC grades. As of October 2020, the college is allowed to admit 180 students annually.

It also offers the D-Ortho (Diploma in Orthopedics) course, which is a two-year post graduation degree on Orthopedics. It also offers post graduation course in Gynae and Obstetrics. The FMC Hospital is a government tertiary care hospital accredited as one of the best hospitals in the country.

== Faculty & departments ==
Pre-Clinical

- Anatomy
- Biochemistry
- Physiology
- Paraclinical
- Community Medicine
- Forensic Medicine
- Pharmacology
- Pathology
- Microbiology

Clinical

- Medicine
- Neuromedicine
- Ortho Surgery
- Burn & Plastic Surgery
- Cardiology
- Pediatrics and Neonatology
- Paediatric Surgery
- Ear, Nose, Throat (Otorhinolaryngology)
- Anesthesiology
- Ophthalmology
- Obstetrics & Gynecology
- Gastroenterology
- Radiology
- Dentistry
- Blood Transfusion Medicine
- Skin & VD
- Orthopedix
- Urology
- Nephrology
- Respiratory Medicine
- Physical Medicine
- Psychiatry

== Voluntary organizations ==
- Medicine Club
- Debate Club

== See also ==
- List of medical colleges in Bangladesh
