= National Institute of Cardiovascular Diseases, Bangladesh =

Government organization in Dhaka, Bangladesh

National institute of cardiovascular diseases
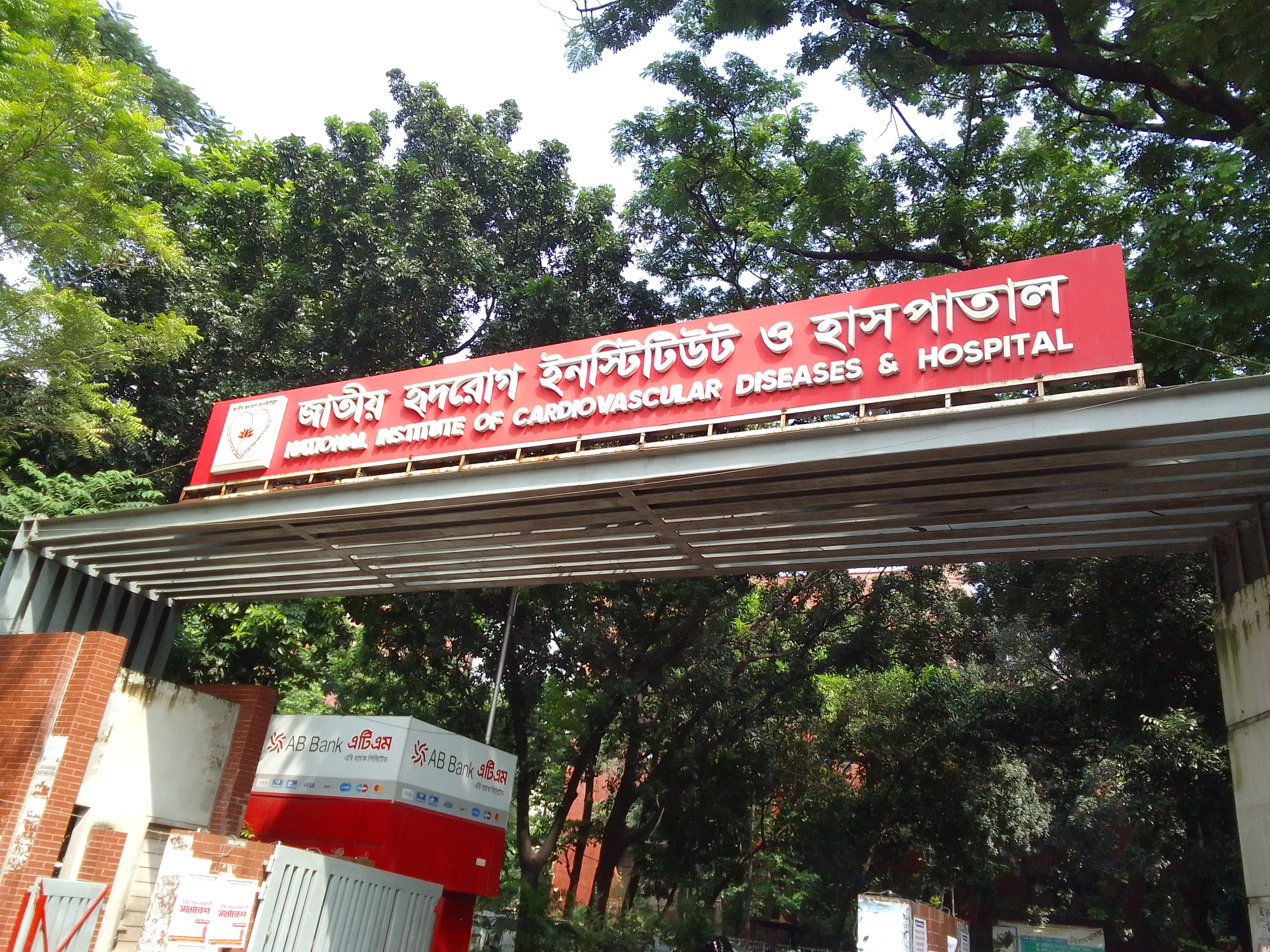
- National Institute of Cardiovascular Diseases, Bangladesh
- Formation: 1978
- Headquarters: Dhaka, Bangladesh
- Region served: Bangladesh
- Official language: Bengali
- Website: nicvd.gov.bd

The National Institute of Cardiovascular Diseases (NICVD) is a government run tertiary hospital in Bangladesh to provide health care services to cardiac and Vascular patients. It is located at Sher-e-Bangla Nagor Thana, Dhaka. It covers primary to tertiary health care.

== History ==
The National Institute of Cardiovascular Diseases was established in 1978 to ensure complete cardiac care to patients as well as training for physicians, nurses and technicians involved with delivery of cardiac care to meet the increasing demand. In July 1988 the institute introduced postgraduate medical courses.

On 28 January 2024, in Bangladesh, the National Institute of Cardiovascular Diseases successfully performed the country's first remote robotic stent placement surgery.

== Criticism ==
In October 2016, a private contractor was prevented by the staff from installing oxygen tubes in the Neonatal Intensive Care Unit of the hospital after the contractor refused to bribe them.
