= Sir Salimullah Medical College =

Public medical college in Dhaka, Bangladesh

- স্যার সলিমুল্লাহ মেডিকেল কলেজ
- Crest of SSMC
- Former name: Dacca Medical School (1875–1962)
- Type: Public medical college
- Established: 1875; 151 years ago
- Accreditation: BMDC
- Academic affiliations: University of Dhaka
- Principal: Prof. Dr. Mohammad Monir-uz-Zaman
- Director of Hospital: Brig. Gen. Md. Mazharul Islam Khan
- Academic staff: 145
- Students: 1,600
- Location: Dhaka, Bangladesh; 23°42′38″N 90°24′04″E
- Campus: Urban
- Colors: Red and white
- Website: www.ssmcmh.gov.bd

Sir Salimullah Medical College (SSMC), commonly known as Mitford, is a public medical college in Dhaka, Bangladesh. Founded in 1875, it is the oldest medical school in Bangladesh. It includes Mitford Hospital, which is the oldest hospital in the country and one of the earliest hospitals in the Indian subcontinent from where evolution of medical education started in the region.

The medical college was established to promote medical education in East Bengal and to provide better healthcare services to the people. It has been producing quality physicians, eminent researchers and health policy makers who are currently working in different medical sectors at home and abroad.

== History ==
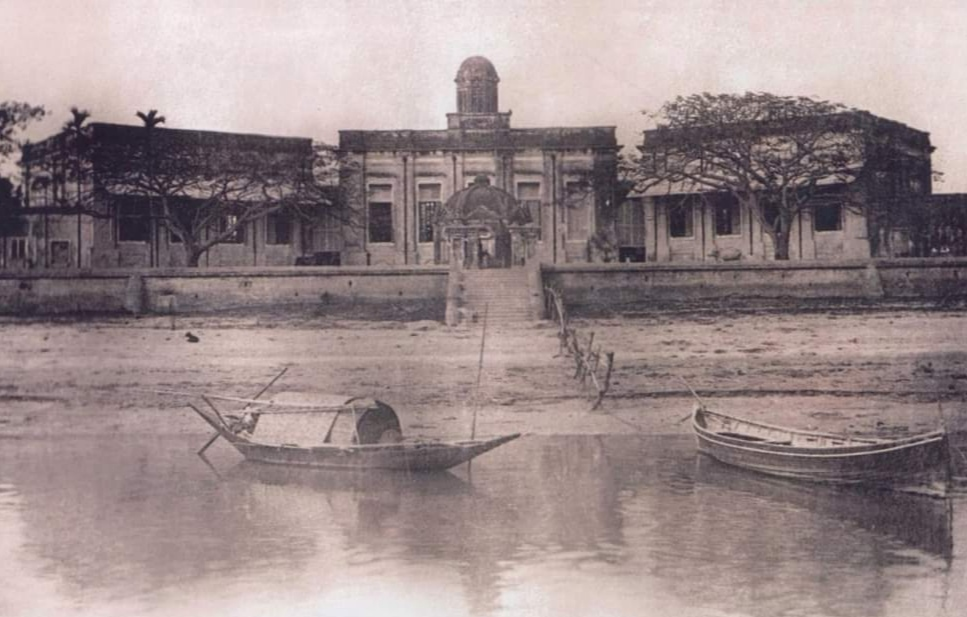
Mitford Hospital seen in a photo from circa 1880

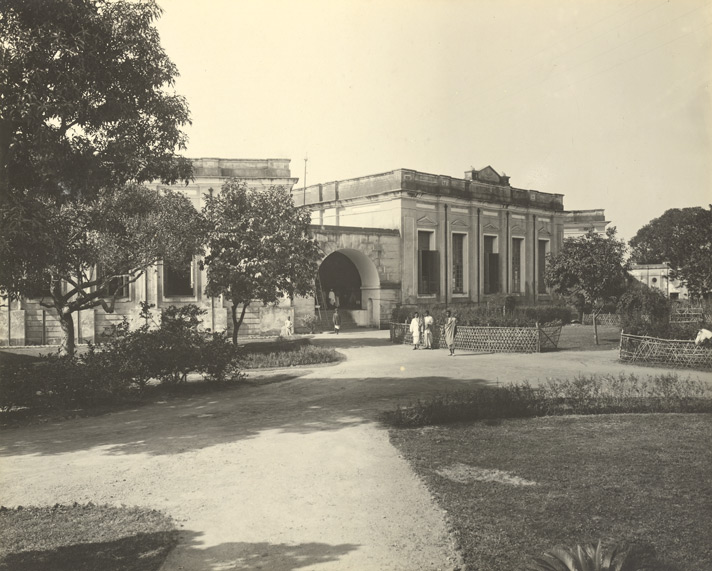
Mitford Hospital, Dhaka. Photograph taken by Fritz Kapp in 1904

Sir Salimullah Medical College was established in 1875 in Old Dhaka as Dacca Medical School with Mitford Hospital being a part of the college. Mitford Hospital was named after Robert Mitford, a British colonial official, who funded the hospital. He left his estate to the government of Bengal to establish a medical facility in Dhaka. The Governor General of India, James Broun-Ramsay, 1st Marquess of Dalhousie, established Mitford Hospital with the endowment. Funding for the school came from 16 aristocrats and philanthropists of Bengal. Babu Protap Chandra Dash, Gour Netai Shaha Shonkhonidhy, Shontosh Rani Dinmony Chowdhurany, and Shontosh Raja Monmoth Roy Chowdhury contributed funding for the water and sewage facilities of the school.

A medical school, the first of its kind in this region, began its journey on 15 June 1875. Later on, the DC of Dhaka division Mr. W.R. Larmini laid the foundation stone of the academic building in April 1887. In September 1889, Governor of Bengal Sir Steuart Colvin Bayley presided over the opening ceremony of that building.

A total number of 384 students got admitted to the school in the first batch. The number increased by and by. They got admitted for a 4-year course leading to a diploma of LMF (Licentiate of Medical Faculty), offered by the State Medical Faculty.

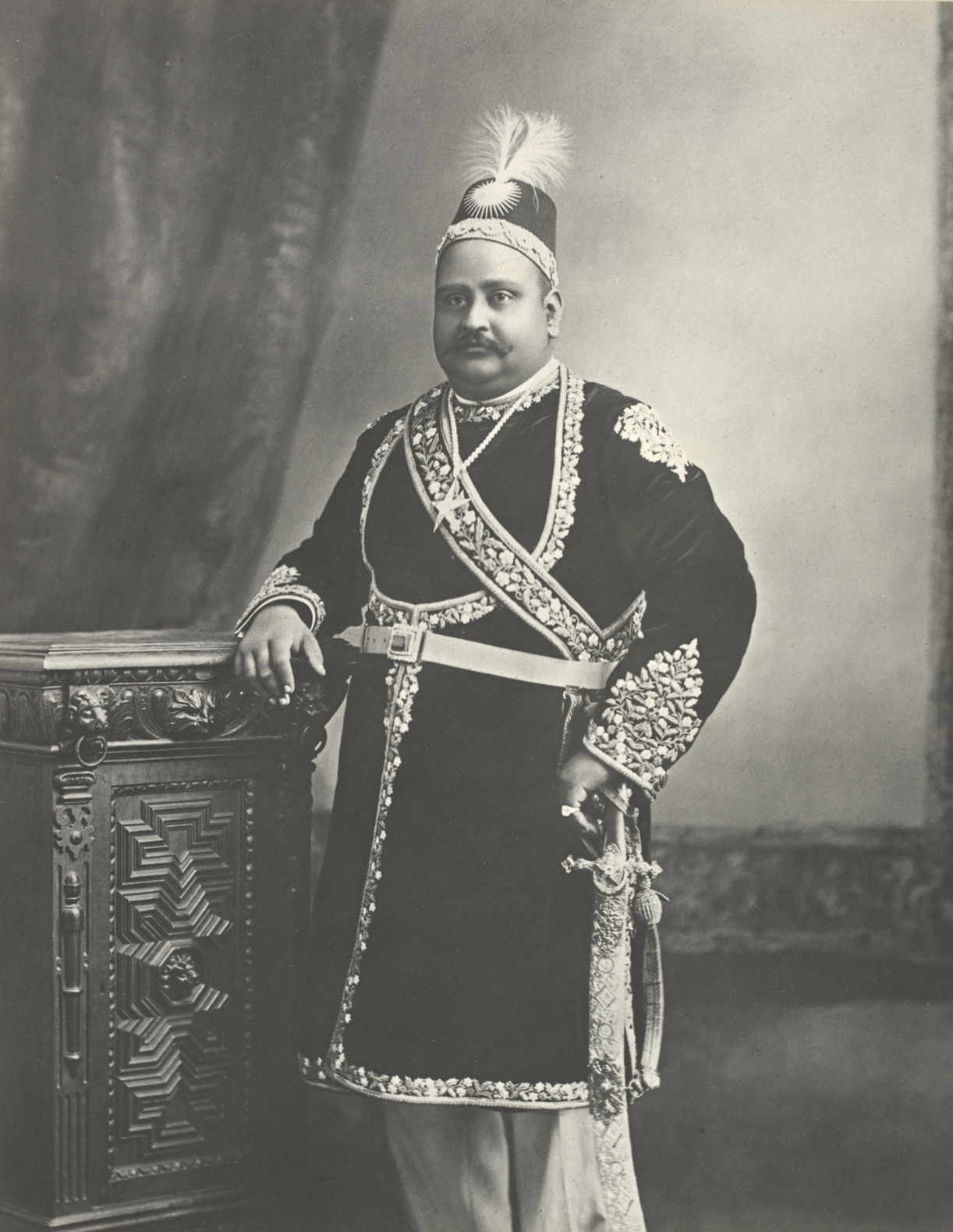
Nawab Sir Khwaja Salimullah

The LMF course was abandoned in 1957. The medical school was converted to a medical college and named Mitford Medical College in 1962. The next year, East Pakistan governor Abdul Monem Khan renamed it Sir Sallimullah Medical College, after Khwaja Salimullah, Nawab of Dhaka, in recognition of the contribution of the Nawab family to the establishment of the college. From 1963 to 1973, the college offered a condensed MBBS program.

AFM Nurul Islam took the chair of principal and started the condensed course of MBBS in 1963. After the Independence of Bangladesh, Professor Dr Muhammad Ibrahim took the chair of principal and under his direct supervision SSMC started its journey as a full-fledged medical college. On 8 February 1973, the first batch of undergraduates started their classes.

In 1974, the Civil Surgeon of Dhaka was relieved of his duty to oversee the college, after which a principal was appointed for SSMC and a superintendent for Mitford Hospital. The superintendent position was upgraded to director in 1984.

The postgraduate courses were introduced in January 2002. In May 2008, the college was suffering from a shortage of classrooms. In 2011, a Dental unit was established as a part of the medical college and the first batch of students of BDS course enrolled in 2012.

== Campus ==
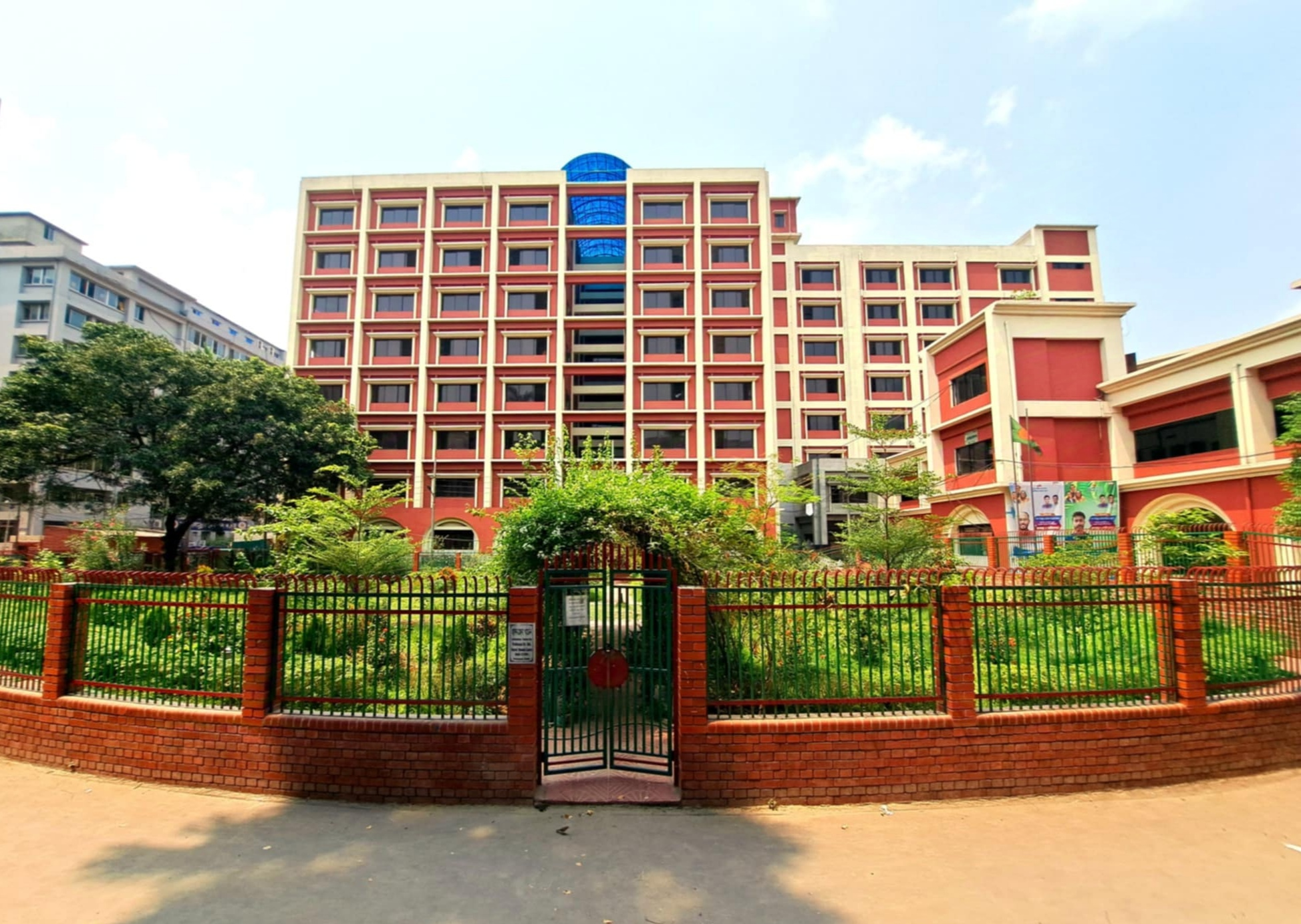
Campus of SSMC

The campus is located at Mitford road, Babubazar, Old Dhaka, the historic old part of Dhaka city. It is spread over about 2.8 acres of land, on the bank of Buriganga river. The medical college building is situated to the south-east of the hospital area, near the river bank with a large garden in front. The building is four-storeyed with a floor space of 4,940 square meters on each floor. The building accommodates the Departments of Anatomy, Pathology, Biochemistry, and Microbiology. The Departments of Physiology, Pharmacology, Community Medicine, and Forensic Medicine are housed in another building in front of the main building.

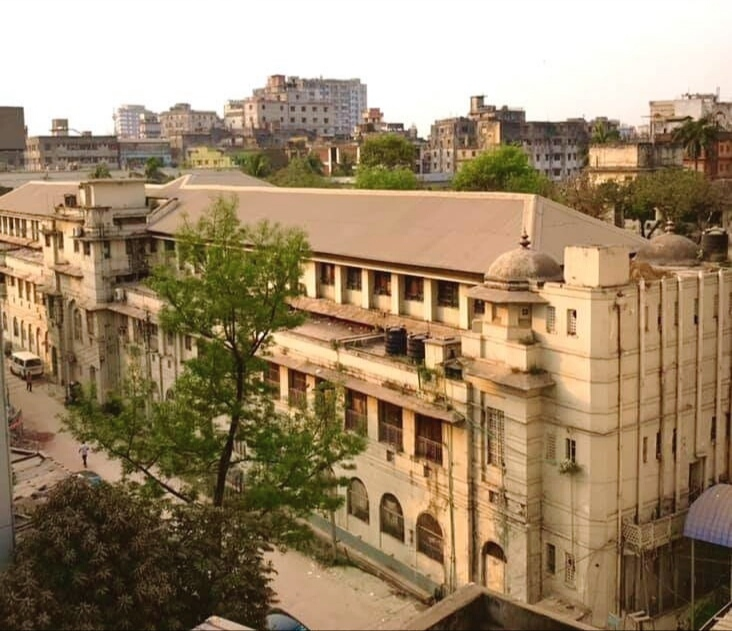
King Edward Building

Mitford Hospital, one of the largest hospitals in Bangladesh, is located adjacent to the college campus. It occupies an oblong area of about 12.8 acres of land on the bank of Buriganga river. The hospital complex comprises more than fourteen buildings, most of which were originally single-storied and later have been raised to multiple storeys. With gradual expansion since its initial foundation, the campus comprises a mix of buildings depicting both modern and colonial architecture.

The main hospital building is eight-storeyed which is commonly known as "Surgery building", as it houses the surgical units. The outpatient department is located in another building, in front of the main building. The King Edward Building is three-storeyed and houses the medicine units, hence it is commonly known as the "Medicine building". The building is named after King Edward VII. A marble plaque on the entrance wall depicts a portrait of King Edward VII, to whom the building was dedicated.

== Academics ==
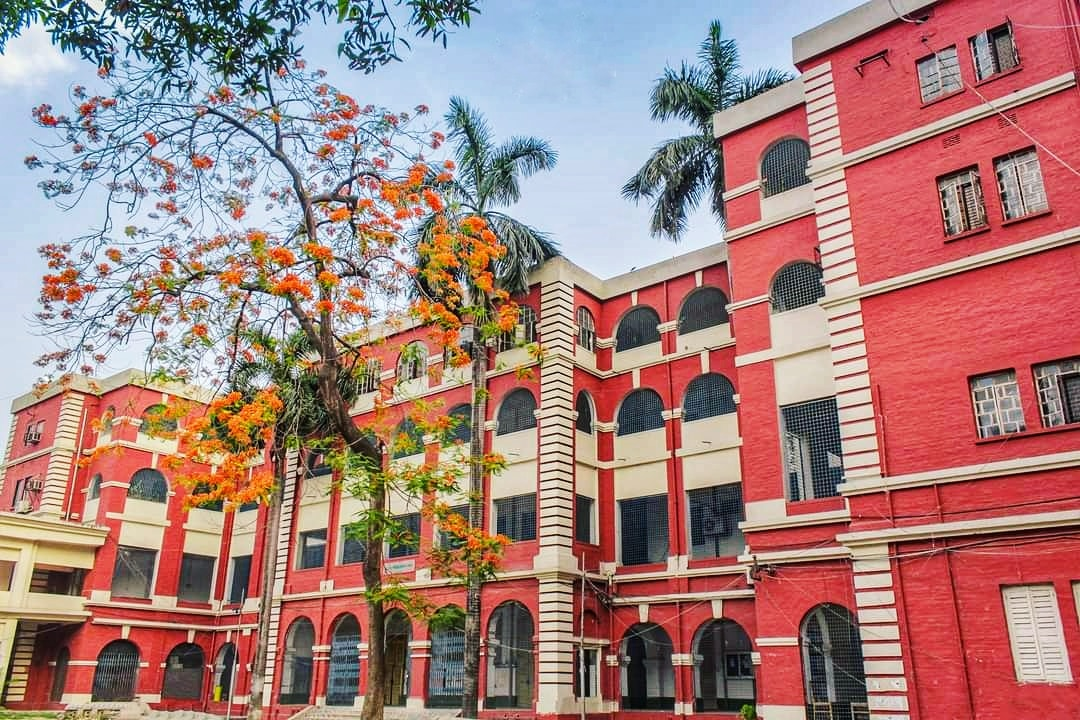
The Academic Building

=== Admission ===
A countrywide combined medical admission test for MBBS course is held every year under the supervision of DGHS. Students after passing Higher Secondary School Certificate or equivalent examinations with the required grades can apply for the test. In 2024, 250 seats were allocated for MBBS course in Sir Salimullah Medical College. The qualified candidates, according to their preferences, get the opportunity to study at the medical college. Foreign candidates are selected by DGHS and MOHFW as per required qualifications.

=== Undergraduate ===
The medical college offers MBBS and BDS degrees at the undergraduate level. It conducts the 5-year courses according to the curriculum developed by Bangladesh Medical and Dental Council. A medical student studies anatomy, Physiology, Biochemistry, Forensic Medicine, Community Medicine, Pathology, Pharmacology, Microbiology, Medicine, Surgery, Gynecology and Obstetrics during the MBBS course period.

The courses are divided into four phases. Four professional examinations, one at the end of each phase, are held under the University of Dhaka. After passing the final professional examination, a student is awarded the MBBS degree. After graduation, medical graduates are required to undertake one-year of internship training at the Mitford Hospital.

=== Postgraduate ===
The medical college offers MD, MS, MPhil and Diploma in several specialties in affiliation with the University of Dhaka and Bangladesh Medical University. It is also recognized by Bangladesh College of Physicians and Surgeons to provide training for FCPS and MCPS degree in various specialties.

=== Library ===
The library is situated on the ground floor of new academic building with a large collection of medical books. SSMC has a developing library section with books about educational innovations, educational psychology, instructional techniques, curriculum development, curriculum evaluation etc. Many WHO and other publications on human resource development for health are also available. The library is enriched with more than 150 journals and 23000 medical books.

== Dental unit ==
In 2011, a Dental unit was established as a part of the medical college. The first batch of students of BDS course enrolled in 2012. A countrywide combined dental admission test is held every year and 52 seats are allocated for dental students in SSMC.

A dental student studies Anatomy & Dental Anatomy, Physiology, Biochemistry, Pharmacology, Pathology, Microbiology, Medicine, Surgery, Periodontology, Oral and maxillofacial surgery, Conservative Dentistry and Endodontics, Prosthodontics and Orthodontics during the course period. After passing the final professional examination, a student is awarded the BDS degree. After graduation, dental graduates are required to undertake one-year of internship training at the Mitford Hospital.

== Departments ==
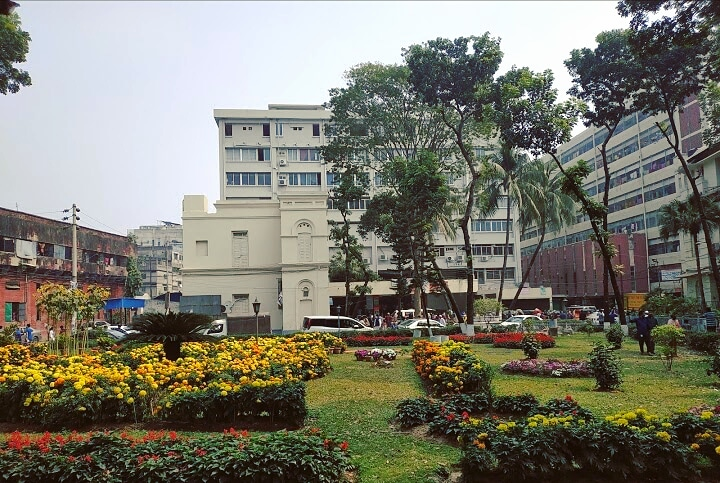
Mitford Hospital area

SSMC and Mitford Hospital consist of following departments:

Pre-clinical

- Department of Anatomy
- Department of Physiology
- Department of Biochemistry

Para-clinical

- Department of Community Medicine
- Department of Forensic Medicine
- Department of Microbiology
- Department of Pathology
- Department of Pharmacology

Clinical

- Department of Medicine
- Department of Neurology
- Department of Nephrology
- Department of Cardiology
- Department of Hematology
- Department of Gastroenterology
- Department of Psychiatry
- Department of Dermatology
- Department of Hepatology
- Department of Pediatrics
- Department of Neonatology
- Department of Respiratory Medicine
- Department of Transfusion Medicine
- Department of Surgery
- Department of Pediatric Surgery
- Department of Neurosurgery
- Department of Burn & Plastic Surgery
- Department of Cardiac Surgery
- Department of Orthopedics
- Department of Urology
- Department of Casualty
- Department of Ophthalmology
- Department of ENT and HNS
- Department of Anesthesiology
- Department of Gynae and Obs
- Department of Radiology

== Student life ==
Female students of Sir Salimullah Medical College circa 1970s

=== Hostels ===
There are five residential halls for accommodation of the students as well as intern doctors. Three hostels for male students and interns are: Main hostel, Alauddin hostel and Intern doctors' hostel. Two hostels for female students and interns are: Ladies hostel and Female Intern doctors' hostel. The ladies hostel suffered from inadequate facilities for the number of female students.

=== Student organizations ===
SSMC pioneered some nationwide appreciated voluntary organizations like Sandhani, Rotaract club, Leo club etc. Medicine Club (a voluntary students' organization) established a unit here in 1990, for the first time outside of Mymensingh Medical College. Following the Non-cooperation movement, all kinds of student politics, clubs, and organizations have been banned by the academic council.

=== Debate and quiz ===
Students of the medical college often participate in debate and quiz competitions. A team participated in the finals of BUP Intervarsity English Debate Competition 2022. A student of this college was announced as the best speaker in the English segment of BUTEX DC National Debate Fest 2022. Debate and Quiz Society of SSMC, AIUB Department of Public Health and USAID fellows worked closely to arrange the first Global Health Festival in 2014. That year, Debate and Quiz Society also organized the 'IFIC Bank-DQS SSMC Carnival Captive 2014', the event had sections of liberation war olympiad, inter-university debate and quiz competitions, medical spelling competition (medispell) and ideation competition workshop on various topics.

=== Sports facilities ===
SSMC has a large playground located a few blocks away from the main campus, known as Armanitola playground. The ground was built by Nawab Salimullah during the British Raj. This is a field of historical significance, the first public meeting of Awami Muslim League was held on this field in 1949.

Now it is used as a venue for annual sports events as well as for cricket and football competitions. Students can access the facility all year round. Besides, the Main hostel has a badminton court and indoor games facilities.

=== Cultural activities ===
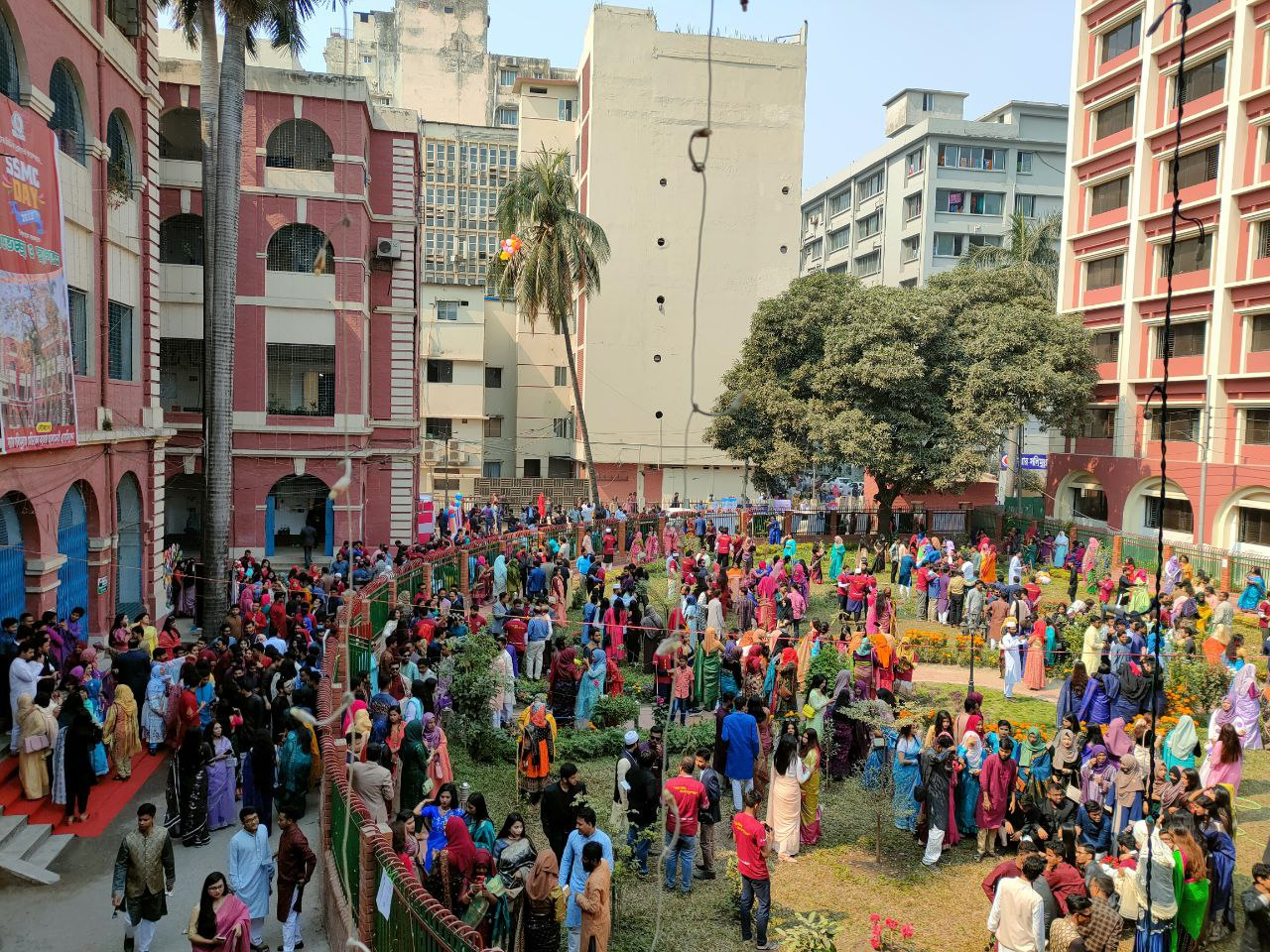
SSMC Day 2023

Student organizations of the college arrange several cultural programmes every year. SSMC Day is celebrated each year on the premises on 8 February, the founding day of the institution. A joyous procession circumambulates the campus marking the occasion.

== Ranking ==
Sir Salimullah Medical College is ranked second among the government medical colleges in Bangladesh by the Ministry of Health and Family Welfare ranking.

== Recognition ==
Sir Salimullah Medical College is listed in the World Directory of Medical Schools. It is approved by the National Medical Commission of India. Graduates of this medical college are eligible to appear in different medical licensing examinations like USMLE, PLAB, AMC, MCCQE and NZREX.

== Alumni association ==
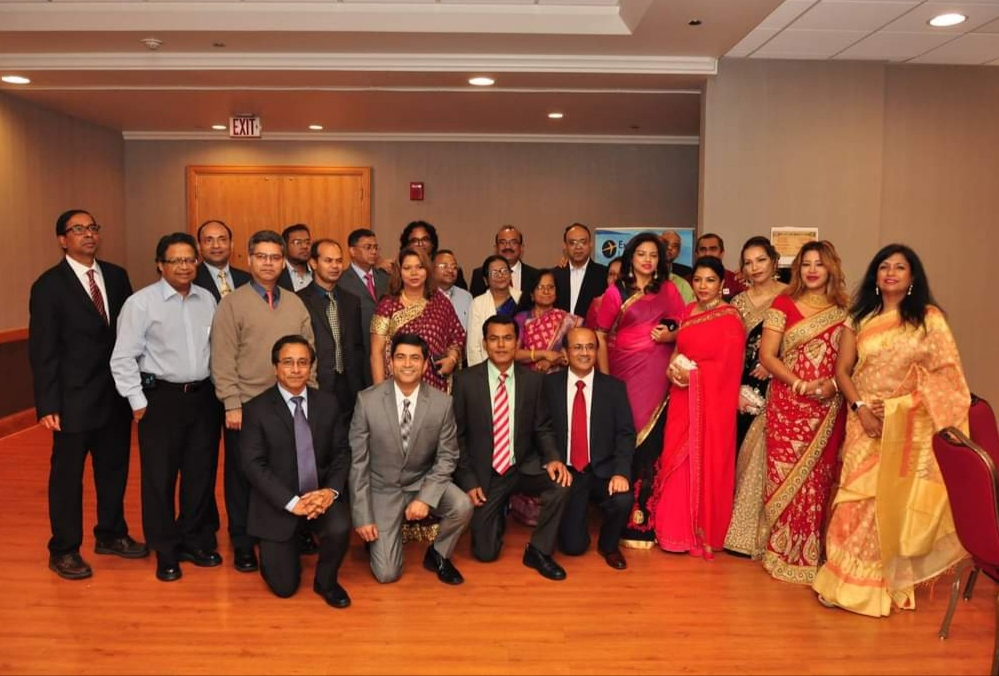
Reunion of SSMC Alumni Association Abroad in Orlando, FL

Sir Salimullah Medical College graduates have a strong alumni presence in United States, United Kingdom and Canada. SSMC Alumni Association Abroad is an organization of the alumni who are currently living abroad. The alumni association is involved in exchange of skills and education with the college. They provide scholarship every year to the students of SSMC. The organization responds to national and international crisis, they made donations towards the victims of east coast natural disaster and famine-stricken children of Somalia.

== Notable people ==
=== Alumni ===
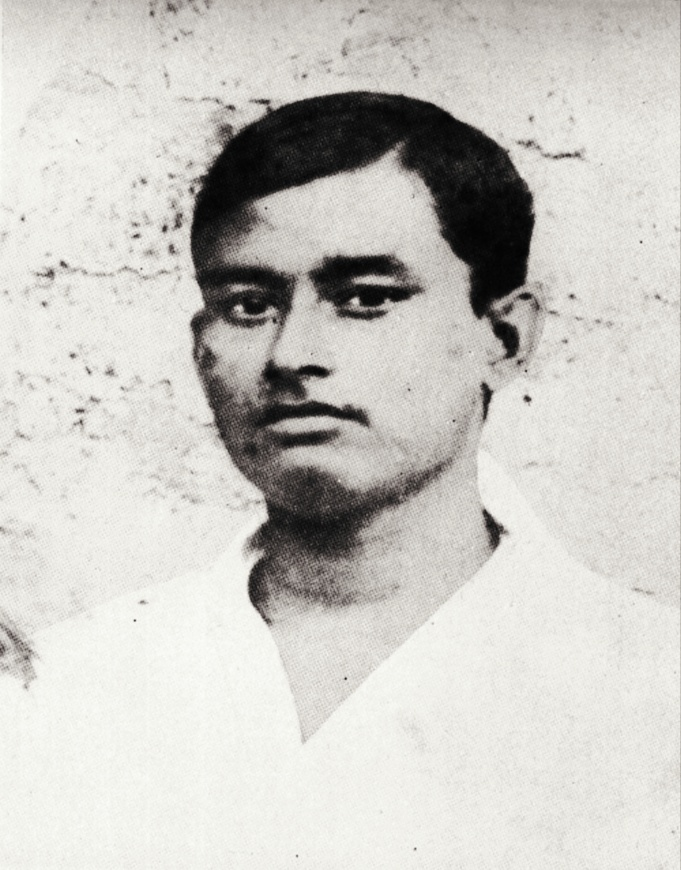
Benoy Basu, Indian revolutionary

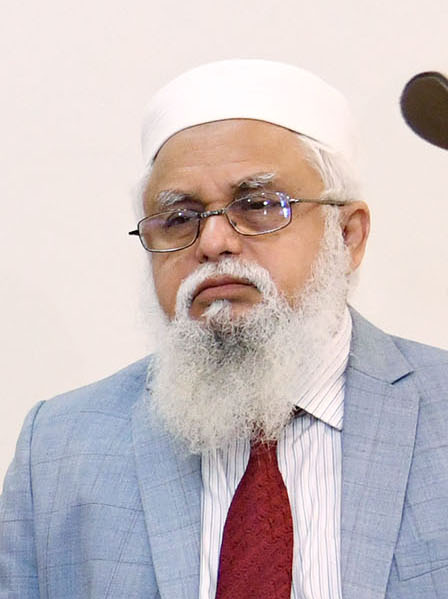
Md Abu Jafor, Director General of DGHS

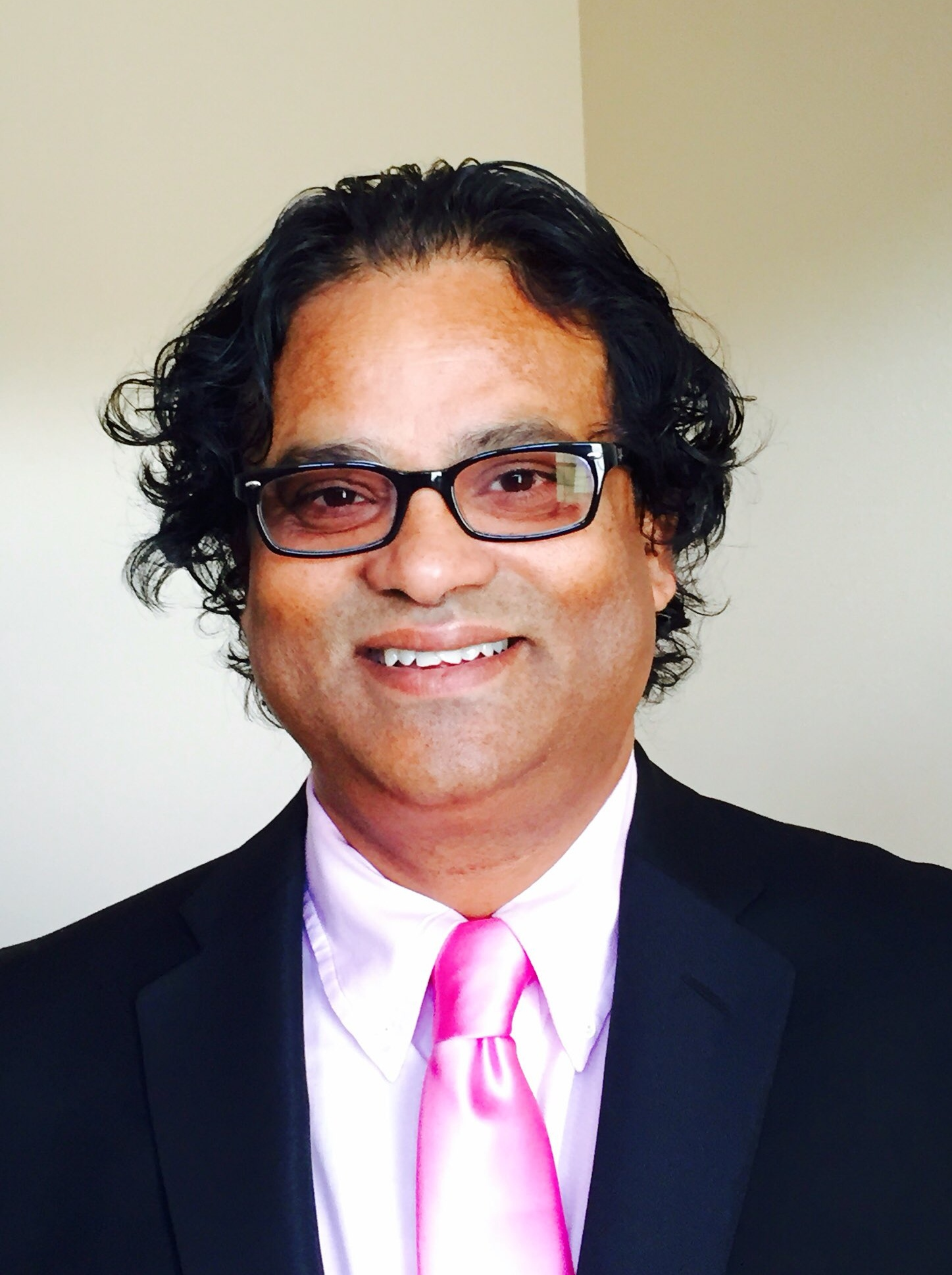
Sezan Mahmud, physician-scientist, writer

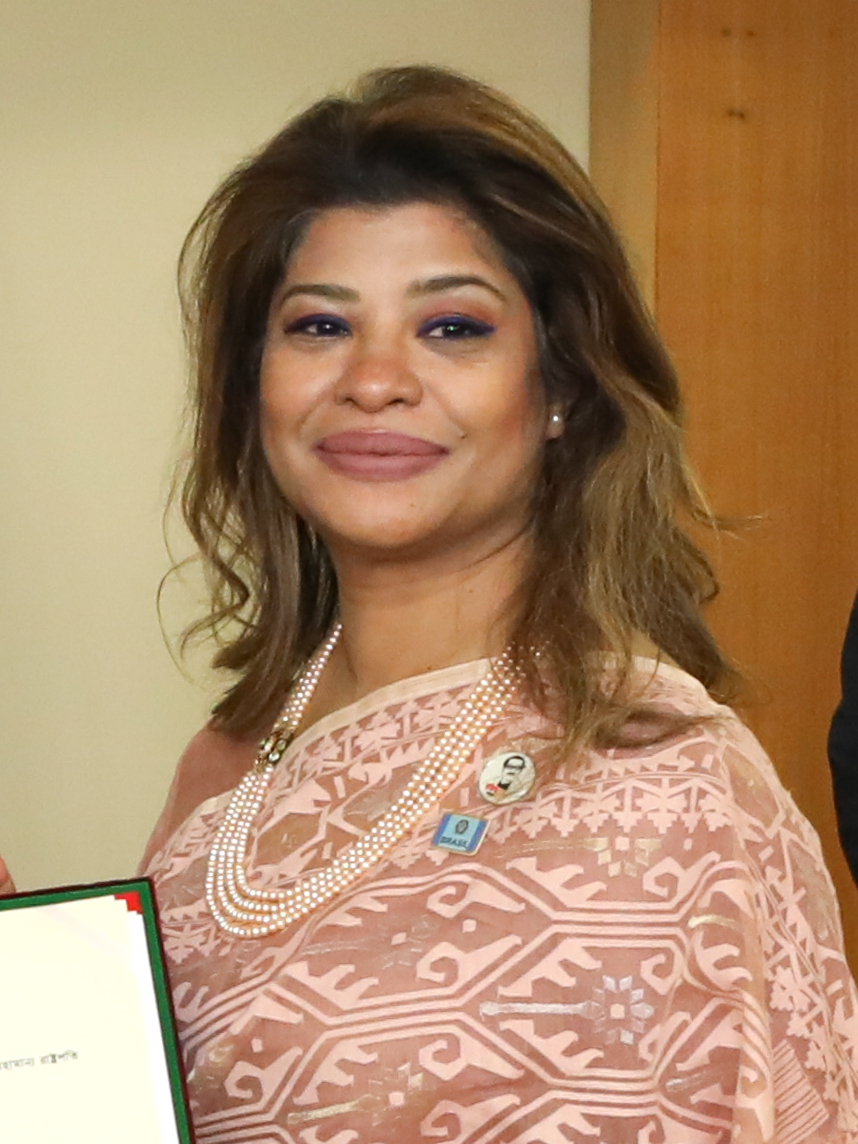
Sadia Faizunnesa, Ambassador of Bangladesh to Brazil
- Md Abu Jafor, director general of Directorate General of Health Services
- Sezan Mahmud, writer, lyricist, columnist, professor of medical sciences at Quinnipiac University
- Mustafizur Rahman, diplomat, High Commissioner of Bangladesh to India
- Sadia Faizunnesa, diplomat, Ambassador of Bangladesh to Brazil
- Bidhan Ranjan Roy, adviser of the interim government of Bangladesh
- ABM Khurshid Alam, director general of Directorate General of Health Services
- Akhlakul Hossain Ahmed, member of parliament, organizer of Bangladesh Liberation War
- Azharul Haque, intellectual killed during the Liberation War
- Rakhal Chandra Das, intellectual killed during the Liberation War
- HBM Iqbal, member of parliament
- Monirul Islam Tipu, member of parliament
- Liaquat Ali, researcher, vice-chancellor of the Bangladesh University of Health Sciences
- Somen Chanda, writer, political activist
- Atiqur Rahman, intellectual killed during the Liberation War
- Mohammad Shamshad Ali, intellectual killed during the Liberation War
- Moin Uddin Ahmed, politician, former member of parliament
- Benoy Krishna Basu, Indian revolutionary
- Rawshan Ara, film actress
- Ashab-ul-Haq, member of parliament, organizer of Liberation War
- Md. Rustum Ali Faraji, member of parliament
- Mohammad Haris Ali, Independence Award recipient
- Pravat Chandra Barua, epidemiologist, vice-chancellor of the University of Science and Technology Chittagong
- Faridul Alam, vice-chancellor of the Bangladesh University of Health Sciences
- Naderuzzaman Khan, politician, organizer of Liberation War
- Md Mafzalur Rahman, former Director of Medical Services, Bangladesh Army

=== Faculty ===
- AFM Alim Chowdhury, ophthalmologist
- Zohra Begum Kazi, gynecologist, first Bengali Muslim female physician
- A. Q. M. Badruddoza Chowdhury, former president of Bangladesh
- Muhammad Ibrahim, National Professor of Bangladesh
- Nurul Islam, National Professor of Bangladesh
- AHM Touhidul Anowar Chowdhury, Independence Award recipient
- Pran Gopal Datta, Independence Award recipient
- Badrul Alam, physician, language activist
- Shamsuddin Ahmed, surgeon, intellectual killed during the Bangladesh Liberation War
- Sayeba Akhter, gynecologist, Ekushey Padak recipient
- Hajera Mahtab, endocrinologist
- Mujibur Rahman, medical scientist, Ekushey Padak recipient
- Syed Modasser Ali, ophthalmologist
- Arup Ratan Choudhury, dentist, Ekushey Padak recipient
- ARM Luthful Kabir, pediatrician
- Rafiques Salehin, general, laparoscopic and robotic surgeon

== In popular culture ==
A scene from the Pakistani drama film Jago Hua Savera was filmed at Mitford Hospital in 1958.

== See also ==
- List of dental schools in Bangladesh
- List of medical colleges in Bangladesh
- List of universities in Bangladesh
