= Mohammed Shahidullah (general) =

Bangladesh Army general (died 2020)

- Died: 25 July 2020; Dhaka, Bangladesh
- Military career
- Allegiance: Bangladesh
- Branch: Bangladesh Army
- Service years: 1985–2020
- Rank: Brigadier General
- Unit: Army Medical Corps
- Commands: Deputy Director of Directorate General of Medical Services; Director of Medical Corps at Army Headquarters; Director of Central Medical Depot; Head(Orthopedic) of CMH, Dhaka; Commandant of CMH, Bogra; Head(Surgery) of CMH, Saidpur

Mohammed Shahidullah (1963/1964 – 25 July 2020) was a brigadier general of the Bangladesh Army and former director of the Central Medical Store Depot.

== Career ==
Shahidullah served in the Bangladesh Army medical corps. He was an orthopedic and spine surgeon. He had served as the deputy director general of medical services in the Directorate General of Medical Services of the Bangladesh Armed Forces.

Shahidullah served as the director of the central medical store depot. He was replaced after a scandal involving the supply of fake N95 masks on 23 May 2020. He had threatened to sue newspapers that named Minister of Health and Family Welfare Zahid Maleque, Maleque's son, secretary Md Ashadul Islam, and Director General of Directorate General of Health Services Abul Kalam Azad.

Shahidullah was recalled back to Bangladesh Army headquarters. He was replaced by Abu Hena Morshed Zaman. He blamed a section of employees of the Ministry of Health and Family Welfare. After which he wrote a letter to the secretary of public administration on 30 May 2020, in which he requested that the Ministry of Health and Family Welfare be made syndicate-free. He made accusations about the Mithu syndicate, led by Motazzaroul Islam Mithu, controlling the public procurement in the healthcare sector in Bangladesh.

== Death ==
Shahidullah died on 25 July 2020 from COVID-19 in the Combined Military Hospital.
