= Central Medical Store Depot =

Bangladeshi government agency

- Formation: 1972
- Headquarters: Dhaka, Bangladesh
- Region served: Bangladesh
- Official language: Bengali

Central Medical Store Depot (Bengali: বাংলাদেশ কেন্দ্রীয় ঔষধাগার) is a Bangladesh government agency under the Ministry of Health and Family Welfare that is responsible for procuring medical equipment for public hospitals.

== History ==
Central Medical Stores Depot decided to purchase 33 anaesthesia machines for 15 million taka on 25 January 1998. It was being purchased under the 4th Health, Population and Nutrition Sector Programme of the Government of Bangladesh and financed by the World Bank. They were purchasing against the recommendation of the technical committee who had deemed the machines unsafe.

An investigation by the Hospital Management Service of the Directorate General of Health Services in 2013 found that over 100 different types of medical equipment were left unused in 21 public hospitals. The equipment were brought without proper planning by Central Medical Store Depot and were brought to benefit suppliers and corrupt government officers. The hospitals did not have space, infrastructure, or trained personnel to man the equipment.

Central Medical Stores Depot supplied equipment to Shaheed Ziaur Rahman Medical College Hospital worth 250 million taka. The Daily Star reported the machines were not functioning due to a lack of technicians, repairing, and spare parts.

In July 2020, a number of medical suppliers blamed the Central Medical Store Depot for delays in COVID-19 test kits as they were taking too long for approval.

According to Rozina Islam of the daily Prothom Alo there is a lack of coordination between Central Medical Store Depot and the Directorate General of Health Services. Central Medical Store Depot had been requesting more equipment for the COVID-19 pandemic in Bangladesh while the Directorate General of Health Services has failed to provide them with a procurement plan. Health Services Division and the Directorate General of Health Services are responsible for providing plans for procurement.

Abu Hena Morshed Zaman was appointed Director of Central Medical Store Depot on 23 May 2020. He replaced Brigadier General Mohammad ShahidUllah. Shahidullah sent a letter to the Ministry of Public Administration in which he alleged that two senior Ministry of Health and Family Welfare officials forced him to give a contract to MediTech. The two officers, Sirajul Islam, additional secretary of the Ministry of Health and Family Welfare's hospital wing and Wahedur Rahman, Personal Secretary to the Minister of Health and Family Welfare, Zahid Maleque, were transferred following the letter. Shahidullah died from COVID-19 on 25 July 2020.

The Central Medical Store Depot came under criticism after supplying 20 thousand fake N95 respirator masks to ten public hospitals. The masks were received by Senior Storekeeper Yusuf of the Central Medical Store Depot but were not properly inspected. Suspicions were raised over authenticity of the masks at Mugda General Hospital and Khulna Medical College Hospital refused to accept the masks. Doctors at a number of public hospitals went on strike over the lack of protective clothing. Anti-Corruption Commission started an investigation in the procurement of the masks. Anti-Corruption Commission detained Md Abdur Razzak, chairperson of JMI Hospital Requisite Manufacturing Limited, for supplying the fake masks on 29 September 2020. Anti-Corruption Commission alleged that officials of Ministry of Health and Family Welfare, Directorate General of Health Services, and Central Medical Store Depot were involved in corruption and abuse of power. The commission also imposed a travel ban on six officials of the Central Medical Store Depot.

The Dhaka Tribune reported on 28 December 2020 that there were hundreds of ICU beds at the Central Medical Store Depot storage that were no distributed as no requisition requests were sent for them. A member of the National Advisory Technical Committee on COVID-19 stated that he expected demand to rise in January 2021.
