= Md Abu Jafor =

Bangladeshi surgeon

- মোঃ আবু জাফর
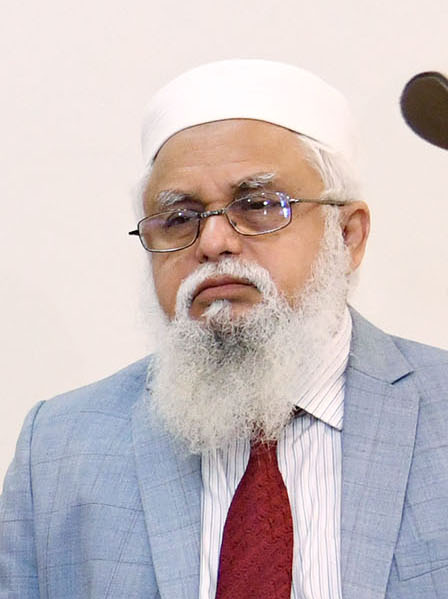
- Jafor in 2025

Director General of Directorate General of Health Services
- In office 15 October 2024 – 10 March 2026
- Preceded by: Abul Bashar Mohammed Khurshid Alam

Personal details
- Born: 31 December 1965 (age 60) Bogra, Bangladesh
- Education: Sir Salimullah Medical College

Md Abu Jafor is a Bangladeshi pediatric surgeon. He was the director general of Directorate General of Health Services of Bangladesh.

== Education ==
Jafor passed MBBS from Sir Salimullah Medical College. He obtained MCPS and FCPS degree in surgery from Bangladesh College of Physicians and Surgeons. He also obtained MS degree in pediatric surgery from Bangladesh Institute of Child Health.

== Career ==
Jafor is a member of 13th batch of Bangladesh Civil Service. His career began in 1994 as a medical officer at Sakhipur Union Health Sub-centre of Bhedarganj upazila of Shariatpur district. After that, he served as assistant registrar, assistant professor, associate professor and professor in pediatric surgery department in various institutions including Rajshahi Medical College and Dhaka Medical College Hospital. Before appointed as Director General of Directorate General of Health Services he was working as a professor and head of department of pediatric surgery at Sir Salimullah Medical College, Dhaka.

On 15 October 2024, he was appointed as the Director General of Directorate General of Health Services.

== Research ==
Jafor has published significant papers on various complex diseases in pediatric surgery, such as intestinal atresia, pyloric stenosis and choledochal cyst management. He has authored numerous research papers in national and international medical journals.
