= Abdul Momin (politician) =

Bangladeshi politician

- আবদুল মোমিন

Member of the Bangladesh Parliament for Netrokona-2
- In office 28 October 2001 – 16 July 2004
- Preceded by: Fazlur Rahman Khan
- Succeeded by: Abu Abbas

Member of the Bangladesh Parliament for Netrokona-4
- In office 14 July 1996 – 13 July 2001
- Preceded by: Lutfozzaman Babar
- Succeeded by: Lutfozzaman Babar

Personal details
- Born: 1929
- Died: 16 July 2004 (aged 75); Dhaka, Bangladesh
- Political party: Bangladesh Awami League
- Spouse: Rebecca Momin

Abdul Momin (1929 – 16 July 2004) was a Bangladesh Awami League politician and Jatiya Sangsad member representing the Netrokona-4 and Netrokona-2 constituencies. He also served as the food minister.

== Personal life and death ==
Momin was married to Rebecca Momin. Momin died on 16 July 2004 in Bangladesh Medical College Hospital, Dhaka, Bangladesh.
