= Azharul Haque =

Bangladeshi physician

- আজহারুল হক
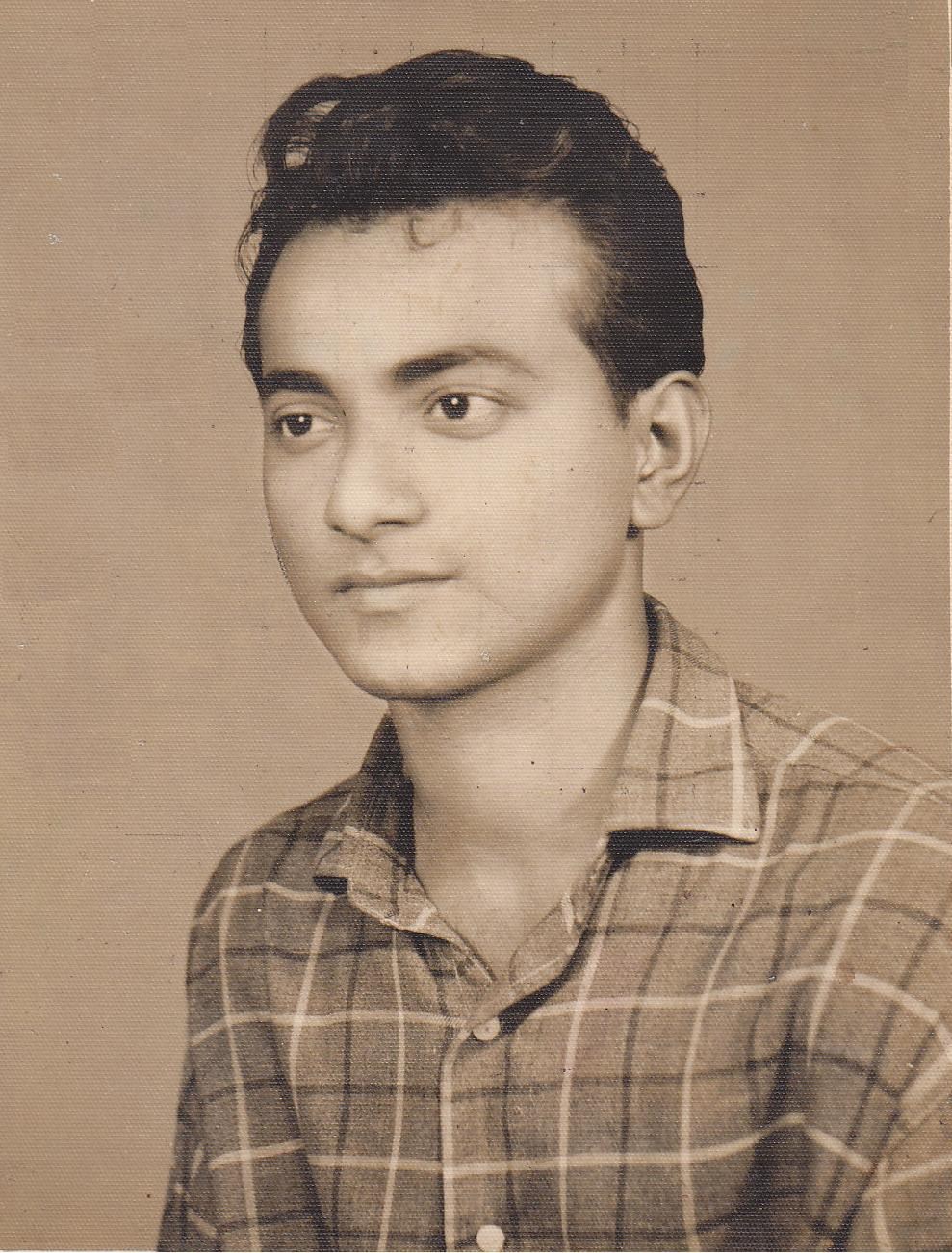
- Azharful Haque, 2 March 1965 when he was a medical student
- Pronunciation: Ājahārula haka
- Born: 2 March 1940; Dacca, Bengal, British India
- Died: 15 November 1971 (aged 31); Motijheel, Dhaka, Bangladesh
- Resting place: Azimpur, Dhaka, Bangladesh
- Monuments: Shahid Minar in Notre Dame College
- Education: Sir Salimullah Medical College
- Known for: Martyred Intellectual

Azharul Haque (Born 2 March 1940) is a Bangladeshi physician-surgeon, who has gone missing during the Bangladesh War of Independence.

== Early life ==
Haque was born on 2 March 1940 in Dacca, British India (now in Dhaka Division, Bangladesh). His father Md. Zahurul Haque, was from West Bengal and was the jailer of Dhaka Central Jail. After his father died, he lived under the care of his older brother, Anwarul Haque, who was also a jail official. He moved around in East Bengal following the different places his brother was posted. He completed his Licentiate in Medicine and Surgery degree from Sylhet Medical College in 1963 and then completed his MBBS from Sir Salimullah Medical College in 1968.

== Career ==
In 1969, he joined Dhaka Medical College as an assistant surgeon. After the outbreak of independence war, he provided treatment to members of the Mukti Bahini in his private chambers in Hatirpool, Dhaka. He was warned by the East Pakistani paramilitary Al-Badr force over his activities in a letter addressed to his practice. In July 1971, he was summoned to the police headquarters and warned. He started treating members of Mukti Bahini in slums near his practice.

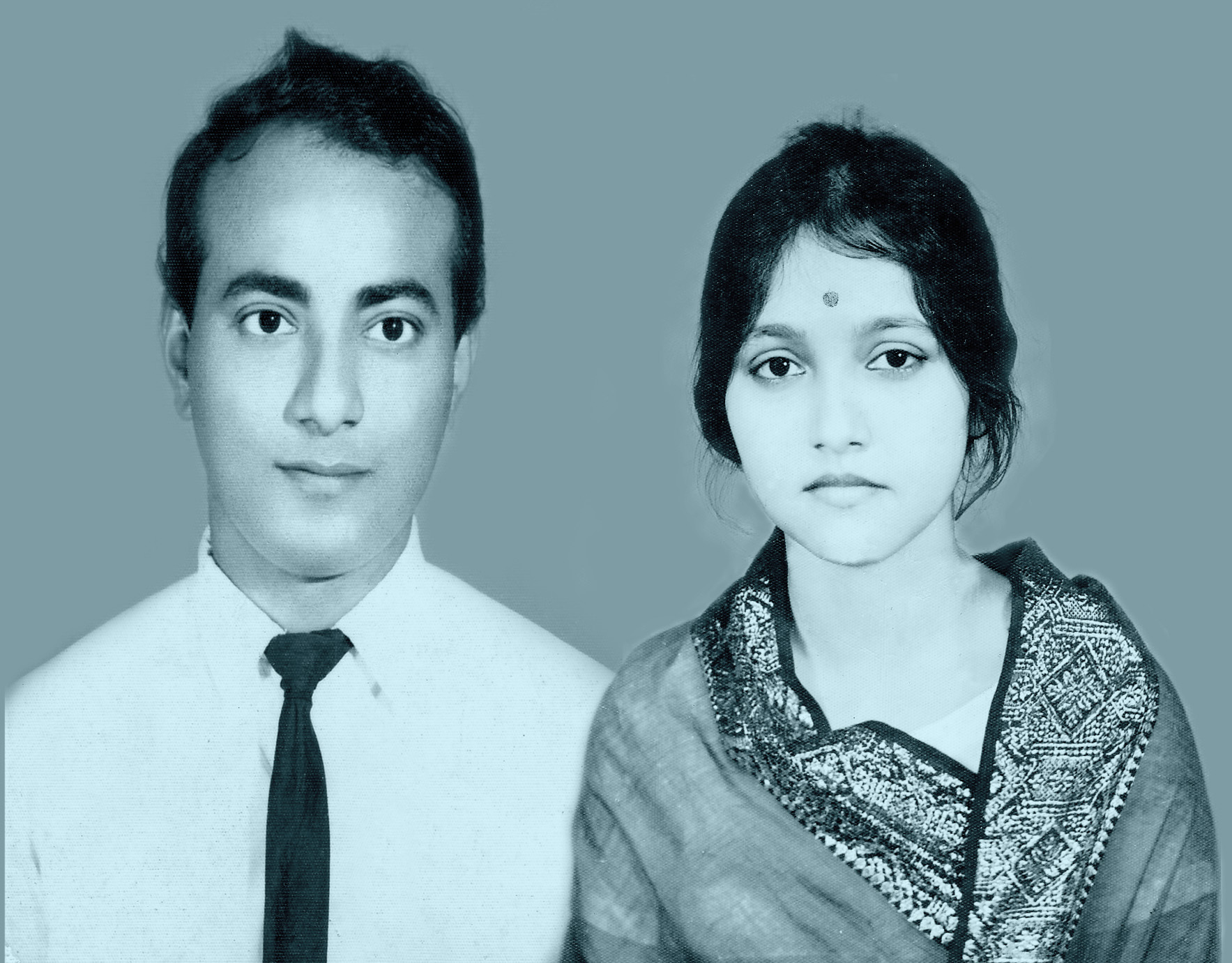
Azharul Haque and his wife Syeda Salma Haque, 15 February 1971

== Death and legacy ==
On 15 November 1971, a curfew was imposed on Dhaka. The area around his practice was surrounded by members of Al-Badr. He and another doctor, A. B. M. Humayan Kabir were waiting for an ambulance when they were spotted by the Al-Badr members, who interrogated them. The Al-Badr were looking for Azharul Haque and arrested the two doctors. Soon, they have gone missing, and searches started. Despite extensive searches, they were never found.

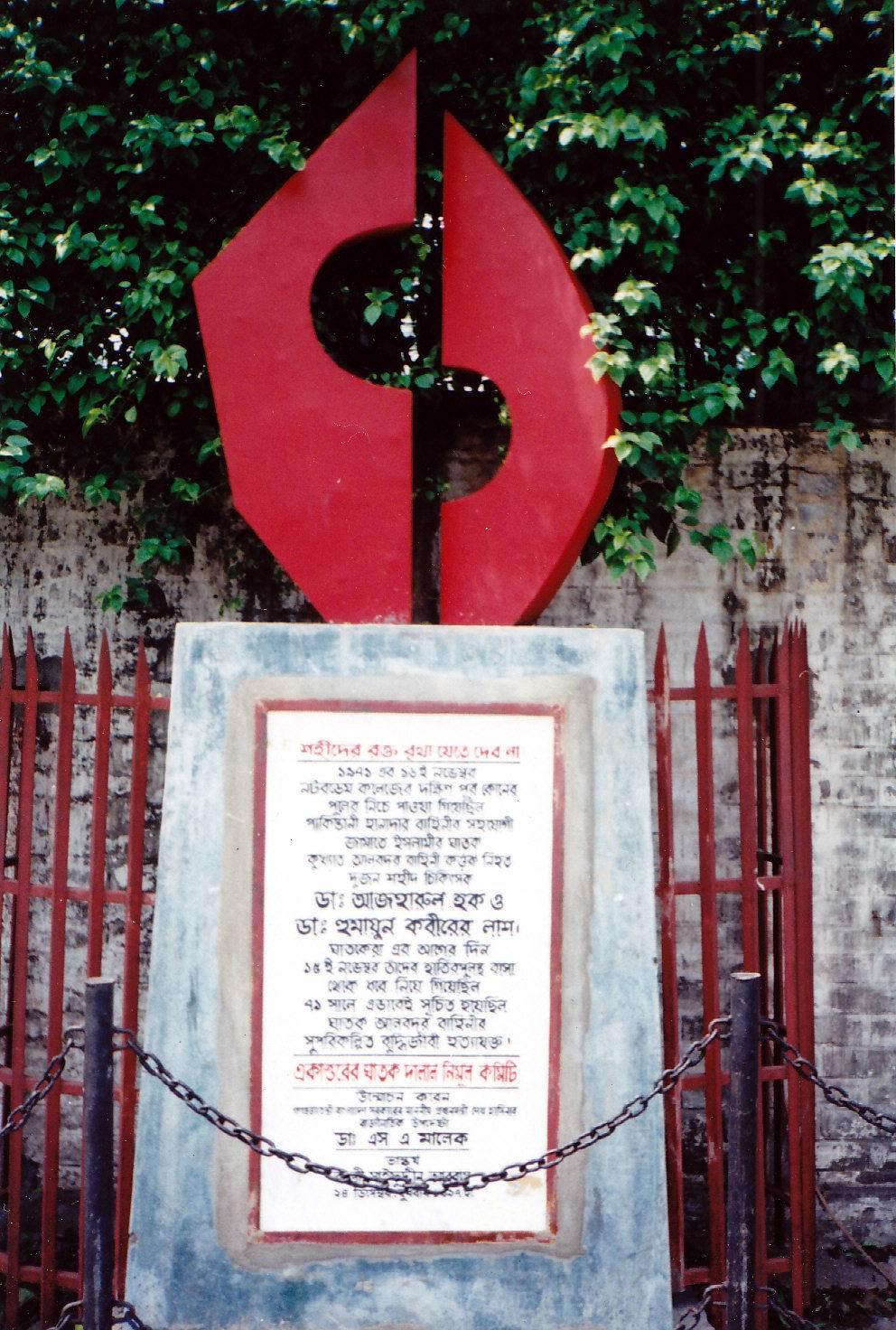
The Monument was founded in front of the culvert near Notre Dame College where Dr. Azhaul Haque and Humayun Kabir were last seen alive

== Personal life ==
Haque was married to Syeda Salma Haque. His granddaughter studied at the University of Toronto in 2020.
