= Obaidul Hassan =

Chief Justice of Bangladesh from 2023 to 2024

- ওবায়দুল হাসান
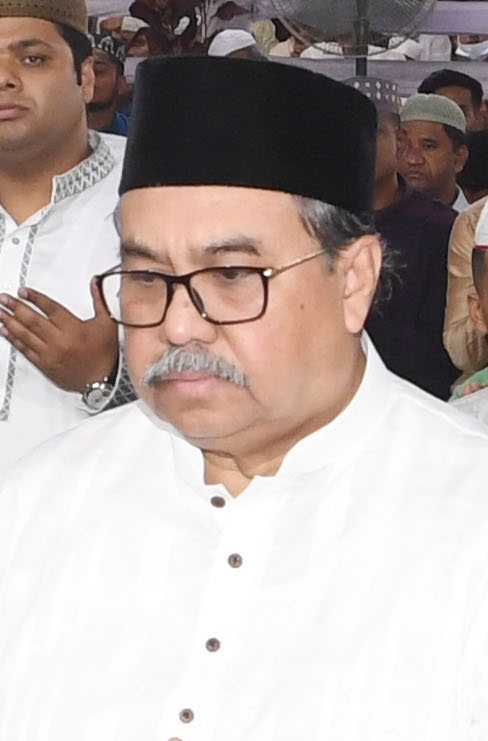
- Hassan in 2024

24th Chief Justice of Bangladesh
- In office 26 September 2023 – 10 August 2024
- Appointed by: Mohammed Shahabuddin (President of Bangladesh)
- Preceded by: Hasan Foez Siddique
- Succeeded by: Syed Refaat Ahmed

Personal details
- Born: 11 January 1959 (age 67) Mohanganj, East Pakistan, Pakistan (now Bangladesh)
- Parents: Akhlakul Hossain Ahmed (father); Begum Hosne Ara Hossain (mother)
- Relatives: Sajjadul Hassan (brother)
- Education: University of Dhaka

Obaidul Hassan (born 11 January 1959) is a jurist who briefly served as the chief justice of the Supreme Court of Bangladesh. He was appointed as the chief justice on 12 September 2023 and served as 24th Chief justice of Bangladesh. He also served as the president of the 2022 Search Committee for the formation of Bangladesh Election Commission. He was forced to resign as Chief Justice in the aftermath of the July Revolution.

== Early life and background ==
Obaid was born on 11 January 1959 in Mohanganj Upazila, Netrokona District in the then East Pakistan, Pakistan. Obaid's father was Akhlakul Hossain Ahmed, a member of East Pakistan Provincial Assembly, and his mother was Begum Hosne Ara Hossain. His brother, Sajjadul Hassan, is the incumbent Jatiya Sangsad member representing the Netrokona-4 constituency since August 2023 and a former senior secretary at the Prime Minister’s Office and the chairman of the board of directors of the Biman Bangladesh Airlines.

Obaid completed his undergraduate and graduate degree in Economics from the University of Dhaka. He completed his law degree from the Dhanmondi Law College .

== Career ==
In 1986, Obaid started working as a lawyer in the District Court and the High Court in 1988.

Obaid started working as an advocate in the Appellate Division of Bangladesh Supreme Court in 2005. In 2009, he was appointed an additional judge of Bangladesh High Court and became a full judge in 2011.

Obaid was appointed to the International Crimes Tribunal-2 on 25 March 2012. He was made the chairperson of the International Crimes Tribunal-2 on 13 December 2012.

In 2017, Obaid served as a member of a five-member search committee headed by the then Appellate Division Justice Syed Mahmud Hossain. Later, in 2022, the then president Mohammad Abdul Hamid formed a search committee with Obaid as its chairman.

On 2 September 2020, Obaid was appointed to the Appellate Division of Bangladesh Supreme Court.

On 29 July 2021, Obaid was nominated by Chief Justice Syed Mahmud Hossain as the chamber judge of Bangladesh Supreme Court to reduce backlog of cases at the court through virtual heading during the COVID-19 pandemic in Bangladesh.

In the midst of the non-cooperation movement when a huge number of student protesters, who were calling for the resignation of Sheikh Hasina's government, many protesters were shot to death by the police. Many lawyers submitted a plea to the High Court asking for the immediate cease of using lethal weapons by the police or any other law enforcement agencies. The High Court rejected this plea on 4 August 2024, just a day before Sheikh Hasina was forced to resign as Prime Minister and fled to India in the face of mass protests on 5 August. Obaidul Hassan resigned on 10 August 2024, after students protested his calling upon a full court meeting without consulting the Interim Government and surrounded the High Court. Obaid's tenure was criticised by chief adviser Muhammad Yunus, who called him a "hangman".

== Personal life ==
Obaid is married to Nafisa Banu, a member of the board of directors of Bangladesh Export Processing Zone Authority.
