= Atiqur Rahman (doctor) =

Bangladeshi physician and martyr

- আতিকুর রহমান
- Born: 1 February 1931; Sreenagar, Bengal, British India
- Disappeared: 26 September 1971 (aged 40); Munshiganj, Dhaka, Bangladesh
- Education: Sir Salimullah Medical College
- Known for: Martyred Intellectual

Atiqur Rahman was a Bangladeshi physician who was killed in the Bangladesh Liberation War and is considered a martyr in Bangladesh.

== Early life ==
Rahman was born in Kolapara in Sreenagar Upazila, Munshiganj District on 1 February 1931. He graduated in 1947 from Baliganj A. J. Mitra Institution in Kolkata. He completed his Licentiate of Medical Faculty (LMF) from Mitford Medical School in Dhaka in 1955. He started his MBBS program Sir Salimullah Medical College and studied there till 1970.

== Career ==
After completion of his LMF, he joined as the Medical Officer the Medical Services Centre. The centre was under the supervision of Faridpur District Board. He left the post to start his private practice in 9 Shah Saheb Lane in Narinda. He also worked part-time in People's Ceramic Industries as the attending physician. In 1971 the Bangladesh Liberation war started, Rahman provided medical aid to members of the Mukti Bahini fighting for the independence of Bangladesh. He also provided them with medical supplies.

== Death ==
On 26 September 1971, he was taken from his residence by members of Pakistan Army. He was never seen after that and is presumed to have been killed.
