= Lutfozzaman Babar =

Bangladeshi politician (born 1958)

- লুৎফুজ্জামান বাবর
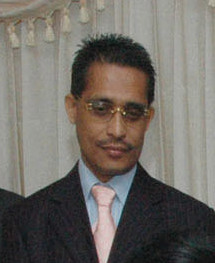
- Babar in 2005

Member of Parliament
- Incumbent
- Assumed office 17 February 2026
- Prime Minister: Khaleda Zia
- Preceded by: Sajjadul Hassan
- Constituency: Netrokona-4
- In office 28 October 2001 – 27 October 2006
- Preceded by: Abdul Momin
- Succeeded by: Rebecca Momin
- In office 5 March 1991 – 24 November 1995
- Preceded by: Ali Osman Khan
- Succeeded by: Abdul Momin

Minister of State for Home Affairs
- In office 10 October 2001 – 29 October 2006
- Preceded by: Mohammed Nasim
- Succeeded by: Sohel Taj

Personal details
- Born: 10 October 1958 (age 67) Netrokona, East Pakistan
- Party: Bangladesh Nationalist Party
- Spouse: Tahmina Zaman
- Children: 4

Lutfozzaman Babar (Bengali: লুৎফুজ্জামান বাবর, born 10 October 1958) is a Bangladeshi politician affiliated with the Bangladesh Nationalist Party (BNP), currently serving as a member of parliament from the Netrokona-4 constituency. He served as the State Minister of Ministry of Home Affairs in the Second Zia Ministry from 2001 to 2006, and was the youngest member of the cabinet.

During this period, Babar drew public and media attention for his political activities, communication style, distinctive appearance, and decision-making abilities, and was also associated with various controversies. During the 2006–2008 caretaker government period and the subsequent Sheikh Hasina administration, he was indicted in several charges related to possession of illegal firearms and weapons, the 2004 Dhaka grenade attack, the 2004 Chittagong arms haul, the Shah A. M. S. Kibria murder case, as well as alleged corruption. He was sentenced to death in two cases and received prison sentences in several others.

Following the resignation of Sheikh Hasina in August 2024, an interim government was formed, after which Babar was acquitted by the High Court in multiple cases, including the 2004 Dhaka grenade attack, the 2004 Chittagong arms haul, and a corruption case. He was also granted bail in several cases, including the Shah A. M. S. Kibria murder case, and was subsequently released from prison in January 2025.

Babar pioneered the Rapid Action Battalion (RAB), which later became controversial due to allegations of misuse and human rights abuses.

== Early life ==
Babar was born on October 10, 1958, in a wealthy Bengali Muslim family with origins from remote Netrokona. His father, A.K. Lutfur Rahman, was a senior officer of the Bangladesh Police who was a part of the President Ziaur Rahman's security team, and as such, had personal connections to Zia and his wife Khaleda Zia and his mother was Zobaida Rahman. Babar is the third among four brothers and three sisters. Babar grew up in the neighborhood of Maghbazar in the capital, Dhaka.

His wife, Tahmina Zaman, was a candidate for the Bangladesh Nationalist Party (BNP) from the Netrokona-4 constituency in the 2018 Bangladeshi general election. The couple has two sons and two daughters: Labib Ibn Zaman, Tasfia Binte Zaman, Fasiha Binte Zaman, and Ahnaf Ibn Zaman.

== Career ==
By the 1980s, under the rule of military ruler Hussain Muhammad Ershad, Babar was a notable figure in the import sector of digital watches, gaining public recognition. He had to stop his Casio business due to smugglers who dealt with illegal Casio carrying in pocket. Babar was involved in the students' politics and emerged as a prominent young political leader. In the 1990s mass-uprising, popularly known as the Anti-Authoritarian Movement, Babar was one of the pioneers to protest against the rule of military ruler Hussain Muhammad Ershad.

=== Entry to politics ===
By 1991, he joined the central committee of the Bangladesh Nationalist Party and became a lawmaker from Netrokona-4 constituency. Babar was elected to parliament twice from Netrokona-4 constituency during 1991–1996 and 2001–2006. In 2001, he was appointed as the Minister of State for Home Affairs as the youngest member of the cabinet of Khaleda Zia.

On 27 December 2008, Babar was expelled from BNP after contesting the 2008 Bangladeshi general election as an independent candidate despite being in prison. In December 2009, BNP withdrew the expulsion order against him and reinstated him in the party.

During the 2026 general elections, Babar won the Netrokona-4 constituency by landslide victory.

=== Ministerial role ===
From 2001 to 2006, Lutfozzaman Babar served as the State Minister for Home Affairs. He has key role in the establishment of the Rapid Action Battalion (RAB) in 2004. He played a role in the BNP government's crackdown on Islamic militancy and capture of Siddiqur Rahman, widely known as Bangla Bhai, a top leader of the militant group Jama'atul Mujahideen Bangladesh (JMB).

== Controversies ==
=== Illegal firearms and weapons ===
During the 2006–2008 political crisis in Bangladesh, Babar was arrested by joint forces from his Gulshan residence on 28 May 2007 on charges of possessing illegal firearms. On 30 October 2007, a special tribunal established by the caretaker government sentenced him to 10 years in prison for illegal possession of a revolver and an additional 7 years for possessing 25 rounds of ammunition. However, on 19 March 2025, a High Court bench comprising Mustafa Zaman Islam and Nasreen Akter overturned the verdict and acquitted him of all charges in this case.

=== 2004 Grenade attack ===
The 2004 Dhaka grenade attack on 21 August on an Awami League rally killed Ivy Rahman, wife of former President Zillur Rahman, along with 23 others and wounded more than 500 people. According to the April 2011 confessional statements by the Harkat-ul-Jihad-al-Islami (HUJI) leader Mufti Abdul Hannan, upon his request, Tarique Rahman, then senior joint secretary general of BNP, assigned Babar, then state home minister, and Abdus Salam Pintu, then deputy industries minister, to provide assistance to the HUJI men to carry out the attack. Hannan met Babar among others in a meeting in Hawa Bhaban, the political office of BNP Chairperson Khaleda Zia. On 18 August 2004, three days before the attack, the HUJI leaders met Babar at the residence of Pintu. In March 2012, a Dhaka court framed charges against 30 accused, including Babar, in the supplementary charge sheet of the case. According to the charges, Babar and Pintu assured all administrative assistance regarding the attack. Also Maulana Tajuddin, supplier of the grenades, also a brother of Pintu, left Bangladesh for Pakistan on instructions from Babar. On 10 October 2018, Babar was given death penalty on charges of killing through criminal conspiracy. He had appealed the verdict. It was found that the confession statement given by the Harkat-ul-Jihad-al-Islami (HUJI) leader, Mufti Abdul Hannan was forced.

Lutfuzzaman Babar later gave a court statement under Section 342 of the Criminal Procedure Code addressing the incident. In his statement, Babar shared his background as a political and former BNP Member of Parliament. He recounted that he was in his office when the explosions occurred and immediately responded by communicating with security personnel and police officials, sending ambulances, and instructing authorities to control the situation. He denied any involvement in the attack, claiming he took all necessary measures to ensure justice and support the investigation. Babar also highlighted the government's actions, including the formation of a judicial investigation commission, seeking assistance from Interpol and the FBI, and offering a reward of one crore taka for information about the attackers.

On November 22, 2024, the High Court concluded a hearing on the appeals and death references of the August 21 grenade attack cases and set to deliver its verdict on any day. On 1 December 2024, Babar was acquitted by high court in this case.

=== Chittagong 10 trucks arms haul ===
On 1 April 2004, Bangladesh Police and Bangladesh Coast Guard interrupted a loading of 10 trucks and seized illegal arms and ammunitions at a jetty of Chittagong Urea Fertilizer Limited (CUFL) on the Karnaphuli River. Babar, the then state home minister, visited the area the next day to inspect the seized arms.

After the 2008 Bangladeshi general election, when Awami League formed the government, fresh investigation started on this case. On 30 September 2010, in a statement to a Chittagong court, Sabbir Ali, the then-police commissioner of Chittagong metropolitan police, said that Babar directed him not to arrest National Security Intelligence officials engaged in helping offload arms and ammunition at the jetty on 2 April 2004. on 3 October, Babar was arrested for direct involvement in that arms haul. On 15 March 2012, former Directorate General of Forces Intelligence chief Sadik Hasan Rumi told Chittagong Metropolitan Special Tribunal-1 that Babar might have links to the smuggling of the arms since Babar forbade him not to conduct an independent investigation into the incident following the seizure. On 30 January 2014, Babar was sentenced to death for his role in the case. Later it was found that Sadik Hasan Rumi has given his statement under the pressure of Awami government as his family members were trapped and tortured. However, On 18 December 2024, Babar was acquitted by high court in this case.

=== Corruption ===
Babar was sued by the Anti-Corruption Commission for hiding information about wealth worth about Tk 7.6 crore in the wealth statement, which he didn't own. On 16 September 2008, he was granted bail on the case. On 2024, High Court acquitted Babar in that corruption case where he had been sentenced to eight years in prison.

=== Shah A M S Kibria murder case ===
On January 27, 2005, former finance minister Shah A M S Kibria was severely injured in a grenade attack after attending an Awami League rally in Baidyer Bazar, Habiganj Sadar Upazila. He died on the way to Dhaka. Several others were also killed and seventy others were injured in the attack. Both a murder case and a case under the Explosive Substances Control Act were filed, which were later transferred to the CID. Following multiple investigations, a supplementary charge sheet was submitted in November 2014, naming 35 individuals including Babar.

However, Asma Kibria, widow of former finance minister Shah AMS Kibria, rejected the supplementary charge sheet, stating that it does not identify the real masterminds behind the killing and described it as "farcical". On 12 September 2024, Babar was granted bail in this case.

== After August 2024 ==
On September 4, 2024, the lawyers of Lutfozzaman Babar submitted a bail hearing petition in four cases in Sylhet. The judge then scheduled the bail hearing for September 11. The following day, on September 13, Babar was granted bail in two cases related to the murder of former Finance Minister Shah A.M.S. Kibria and two cases related to the attempted murder of former Railways Minister Suranjit Sengupta.

On January 14, 2025, the High Court acquitted Babar and 4 others in another case related to the 10 trucks arms and ammunition. He was released from Keraniganj Central Jail on 16 January 2025 after being acquitted of all cases. His imprisonment ended after seventeen and a half years. Thousands of BNP activists, supporters, affiliates gathered near the jail awaiting his release.

Babar visited the Ministry of Home Affairs on 14 September) 2025 nearly 18 years after leaving office, to pay a courtesy call on Home Affairs Adviser Lt Gen (Retd) Jahangir Alam Chowdhury.

== In popular culture ==
Following a press conference after 2004 Dhaka grenade attack, his quote "We are looking for shotruz" (where -z was used as -s in English, after Bengali shotru 'enemy', creating a Banglish sentence) gained popularity among the social masses after July Revolution and is often used in Bangladeshi popular culture and online memes.
