= Abu Hena Morshed Zaman =

Abu Hena Morshed Zaman is a retired Bangladeshi civil servant and secretary of the Ministry of Posts, Telecommunications and Information Technology. He is a former secretary of the Implementation Monitoring and Evaluation Division. He is a former director of the Central Medical Stores Depot. He is a former deputy secretary general of the Bangladesh National Commission for UNESCO.

== Career ==
Zaman was the President of the managing committee of Abujar Ghifari College. He was the Additional Deputy Commissioner (General) of Dhaka.

Zaman was appointed Deputy commissioner of Faridpur District in October 2013. He was serving as director of the Prime Minister's Office. He oversaw the burial of Abdul Quader Mollah in December in Faridpur District after he had been executed for war crimes. Zaman was appointed Deputy Commissioner in Narsingdi District in 2014. At a conference chaired by Zaman, where Minister Syed Mohsin Ali warned journalists about online reports.

In May 2017, Zaman was the Director of Monitoring and Enforcement of the Department of Environment where he led raids against illegal polythene factories.

In May 2020, Zaman, then deputy secretary general of the Bangladesh National Commission for UNESCO, was appointed director of the Central Medical Stores Depot replacing Brigadier General Mohammad Shahid Ullah.

Zaman was promoted to Secretary in October 2021 and made the Secretary of the Implementation Monitoring and Evaluation Division. At the Division, he supported Deputy Commissioners monitoring development projects in Bangladesh. He oversaw the Rooppur Nuclear Power Plant at the Division.

In August 2023, Bangladesh Post Office under Zaman launched special edition stamps featuring Sheikh Kamal. He is the chairman of the board of directors of TeleTalk. In September 2023, he received an offer from Bashundhara Group to buy a stake in TeleTalk. He is the chairman of the governing body of Motijheel Ideal School & College. Justice Zafar Ahmed and Justice Md Bashir Ullah of the High Court Division summoned Zaman over not including Anisur Rahman in the governing body after he had secured a High Court verdict in his favor. Following the fall of the Sheikh Hasina led Awami League government, he was sent into forced retirement. A murder case was filed against him by Bangladesh Nationalist Party politician Mohammad Zaman Hossain Khan over the death of a protestor in July 2024.
