= Sajjadul Hassan =

Awami League politician

- সাজ্জাদুল হাসান

Member of Parliament
- In office 6 August 2023 – 6 August 2024
- Preceded by: Rebecca Momin
- Succeeded by: Lutfozzaman Babar
- Constituency: Netrokona-4

Personal details
- Born: 11 January 1961 (age 65) Netrokona, East Pakistan, Pakistan
- Party: Bangladesh Awami League
- Parent: Akhlakul Hossain Ahmed (father)
- Relatives: Obaidul Hassan (brother)

Sajjadul Hassan (born 11 January 1961) is a Bangladeshi politician and a former Jatiya Sangsad member representing the Netrokona-4 constituency during 2023–2024. Prior to this position, he served as a bureaucrat and the chairman of Biman Bangladesh Airlines. He is a former senior secretary at the Prime Minister's Office.

== Early life ==
Sajjad was born on 11 January 1961 in Mohanganj Upazila, Netrokona District. His father, Akhlakul Hossain Ahmed, was a member of the East Pakistan Provincial Assembly. His brother, Justice Obaidul Hassan, is the 24th chief justice of the Supreme Court of Bangladesh. He completed his SSC and HSC from Mohanganj Government Pilot High School and Dhaka College respectively. He worked to introduce double shift in Mohanganj Government Pilot High School and renovate Shiyaljani canal in Mohanganj Municipality.

== Career ==
Sajjad had served as the district commissioner of Cox's Bazar District and Sylhet District. Hassan was made the personal secretary-1 to the prime minister from the division commissioner of Sylhet Division on 25 February 2015. In 2009, four former Awami League members of parliament accused him of misbehaving with a veteran freedom fighter while Hassan was serving as the deputy commissioner of Sylhet.

On 26 January 2018, Sajjad was promoted from personal secretary-1 to the prime minister to the acting secretary of the Prime Minister's Office. Tofazzel Hossain Miah, previously the director general of the Prime Minister's Office, replaced him as the personal secretary-1 to the prime minister. He was a special guest at the launching of the call centre service number 333 on 12 April 2018 by Sajeeb Wazed. On 25 December 2019, he was promoted to the rank of senior secretary.

Sajjad was appointed chairman of the board of directors of the state owned Biman Bangladesh Airlines on 27 January 2020 by the Ministry of Civil Aviation and Tourism. He replaced Air Marshal Muhammad Enamul Bari. Senior secretary at the Ministry of Aviation, Mohibul Haque, supported steps to keep Biman Bangladesh under government control in 2020 and prevent its privatisation under the chairpersonship of Sajjad. He oversaw a Dash 8-400, named Dhrubatara, aircraft joining the fleet of Bangladesh Biman in 2020 purchased through a government to government agreement between Bangladesh and Canada.

Sajjad is the president of Bangladesh Agricultural Economists Association.

In September 2022, the government broke the trustee board of Manarat International University and created a new board which included Sajjad.
