= Mitford Hospital, Dhaka =

Hospital in Bangladesh

Coordinates: 23.7107°N 90.4019°E

Mitford Hospital
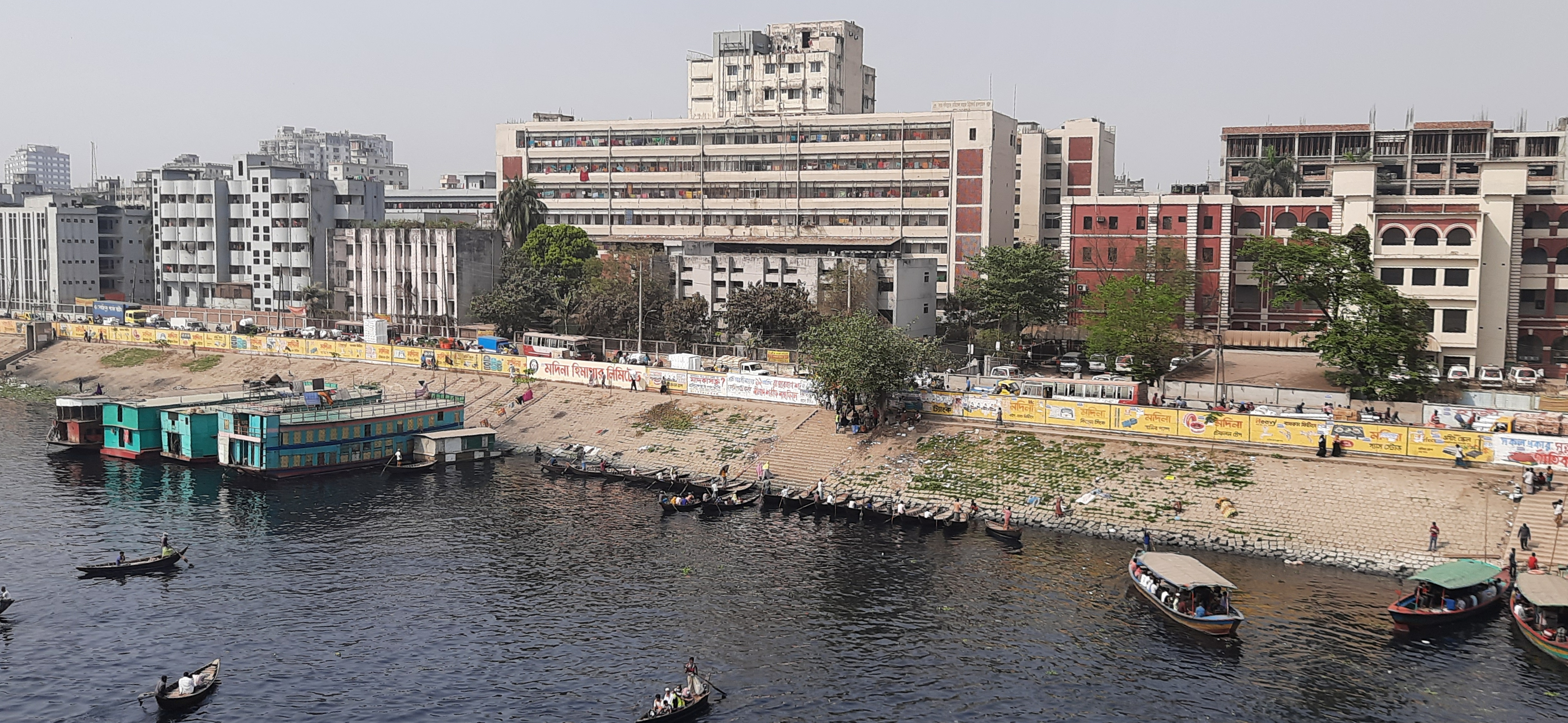
- Mitford Hospital on banks of Buriganga river

Geography
- Location: Dhaka, Bangladesh

Organisation
- Type: Teaching hospital
- Affiliated university: Sir Salimullah Medical College

Services
- Beds: 900

History
- Founded: 1 May 1858; 168 years ago

Links
- Website: ssmcmh.gov.bd

The Mitford Hospital, officially Sir Salimullah Medical College and Mitford Hospital, is a public hospital in Dhaka, Bangladesh. Situated in Old Dhaka area, the hospital serves as a teaching hospital of Sir Salimullah Medical College. The hospital is named after Robert Mitford, a philanthropist and British colonial officer. It was the most important medical institution, not only in Dhaka, but in the whole of East Bengal and Assam in the mid-19th century.

At present, around 750 to 800 patients avail indoor treatment from the hospital while around 1500 patients seek treatment from the out patient department of Mitford each day.

== Departments ==
The Mitford Hospital consists of following departments:

- Department of Medicine
- Department of Neurology
- Department of Nephrology
- Department of Cardiology
- Department of Hematology
- Department of Gastroenterology
- Department of Psychiatry
- Department of Dermatology
- Department of Hepatology
- Department of Pediatrics
- Department of Neonatology
- Department of Respiratory Medicine
- Department of Transfusion Medicine
- Department of Surgery
- Department of Pediatric Surgery
- Department of Neurosurgery
- Department of Burn & Plastic Surgery
- Department of Cardiac Surgery
- Department of Orthopedics
- Department of Urology
- Department of Casualty
- Department of Ophthalmology
- Department of ENT and HNS
- Department of Anesthesiology
- Department of Gynae and Obs
- Department of Radiology
