= Rakhal Chandra Das =

- Born: 1 August 1932; Trishal, Bengal, British India
- Disappeared: 12 May 1971 (aged 38); Sreemangal, Chittagong, Bangladesh
- Status: Missing for 55 years, 3 months and 19 days
- Education: Sir Salimullah Medical College
- Occupation: Physician
- Known for: Forced disappearance Martyred Intellectual

Rakhal Chandra Das (1 August 1932 – 1971) was a Bangladeshi physician who is believed to have been killed in the Bangladesh Liberation War. Das is considered a martyr in Bangladesh.

== Early life ==
Das was born in Dhanikhola, Trishal, Mymemsingh, East Bengal, British India on 1 August 1932. He graduated from Darirampur H.E School in 1949 and from Ananda Mohan College in 1952. He completed his LMF degree from Lytton Medical School in 1955 and MBBS degree from Sir Salimullah Medical College in 1968.

== Career ==
Das joined the Maharaja Suryakanta Hospital in Mymensingh as the Assistant Surgeon in 1955 and worked there till 1956. Afterwards he joined the Dilderpur Tea Garden Hospital as the medical officer in Kulaura, Moulvibazar District in 1957. He worked there till 1959, then joined the Dhanikhola Charitable Hospital in Trishal as the medical officer and worked there till 1966. In 1968 he established an independent practice with his own pharmacy, Gurudayal Pharmacy, attached. He joined Mirzapur Ispahani Tea Garden Hospital at Sreemangal as the medical officer in June 1969. On 25 March 1971, Pakistan Army launched Operation Searchlight and the Bangladesh Liberation war began. The Pakistan Army established a camp in Sreemangal and attacked the local people. The local people and tea garden workers blocked roads, demolished bridges and put up resistance to the army. There were many injured who were treated by Das.

== Death and legacy ==
On 12 May 1971, the Pakistan Army led by Captain Tareq surrounded and attacked the hospital Das worked in. Das was abducted from the hospital and never seen again. He is presumed to be dead.

== See also ==
- List of kidnappings
- List of people who disappeared mysteriously: 1910–1990
