= Rebecca Momin =

Bangladeshi politician (1947–2023)

- রেবেকা মমিন

Member of the Bangladesh Parliament for Netrokona-4
- In office 25 January 2009 – 11 July 2023
- Preceded by: Lutfozzaman Babar
- Succeeded by: Sajjadul Hassan

Personal details
- Born: 15 May 1947; Mohanganj, Netrokona, Bengal Province, British India
- Died: 11 July 2023 (aged 76); Dhaka, Bangladesh
- Political party: Bangladesh Awami League
- Spouse: Abdul Momin

Rebecca Momin (15 May 1947 – 11 July 2023) was a Bangladesh Awami League politician and Jatiya Sangsad member representing the Netrokona-4 constituency for three terms from 2009 until her death in 2023.

== Life and career ==
Momin was born on 15 May 1947, in Mohanganj, Netrokona, Bengal Province, British India. She was married to former Food Minister of Bangladesh Abdul Momin.

Momin was elected to parliament in the January 2009 Bangladesh general elections as a candidate of the Bangladesh Awami League from Netrokona-4 in Netrokona District. Momin was re-elected to parliament in the January 2014 Bangladesh general elections as a candidate of the same party. She was one of 17 women elected to parliament that year.

Momin was the chair of the Parliamentary Standing Committee on the Ministry of Women and Children Affairs. She controversially defended the government law lowering of the marriage age in Bangladesh from 18 to 16. She stated that in certain cases of teen pregnancy the girl can be married to prevent social stigma, while her opponents had argued that less than two percent of young girls marry due to unplanned pregnancy. She had said that she personally did not support the lowering of the marriage age but could not do anything, as the Prime Minister is also in charge of the Ministry of Women and Children Affairs. She faced criticism in December 2014 after stating that the reason for the increase in incidents of rape in Bangladesh was due to women's clothes and their ability to travel outside their homes.

== Death ==
Momin died on 11 July 2023, at the age of 76.
