= Mohibul Haque =

Secretary, Ministry of Civil Aviation and Tourism

- Born: Lokhpur village, Fakirhat Upazila, Bagerhat District
- Education: University of Rajshahi
- Occupations: Politician, former civil servant

Mohibul Haque is the former senior secretary of the Ministry of Civil Aviation and Tourism. He was detained on corruption charges after the fall of the Sheikh Hasina led Awami League government. He is the former Commissioner of Dhaka Division.

== Early life and education ==
Haque was born in Lokhpur village, Fakirhat Upazila, Bagerhat District. At the beginning of his educational career, he completed his secondary education at Khulna Government Laboratory School and after completing his higher secondary education from BL College, he enrolled in the Department of Political Science at Rajshahi University.

== Career ==
In 1988, Haque joined the Bangladesh Civil Service as an admin cadre as part of the 1985 batch. He served as an Assistant Commissioner in the Rajshahi Divisional Commissioner office. As a Senior Assistant Commissioner, and Revenue Deputy Collector, he served in Bogura District, Lalmonirhat District, Barishal District, and Jashore District. He was the Upazila Nirbahi Officer at Sitakunda Upazila. He was the deputy commissioner of Jessore District. Haque founded the Jashore Collectorate School and built a mural of Sheikh Mujibur Rahman in Jessore.

In 2011, Haque was awarded the Mother Teresa Research Council gold medal. He was promoted to Joint Secretary and posted to the APD Wing of the Ministry of Public Administration. He was serving as the Deputy Commissioner of Dhaka District. As DC, he had cancelled the publication license of Amar Desh as it did not have a listed publisher. In December 2013, he spoke against the management committee of Milk Vita after it removed the Managing Director of Milk Vita Mohammad Munir Chowdhury. He as then promoted to additional secretary and appointed to the Security Service Division of the Ministry of Home Affairs.

In November 2018, Ruhul Kabir Rizvi, Senior Joint Secretary General of the Bangladesh Nationalist Party, alleged Haque attended a secret meeting of bureaucrats and police officers to rig the 2018 Bangladeshi general election in favor of the ruling Awami League at the Officer's Club. He also alleged the meeting was attended by Sajjadul Hassan, Prime Minister's Office Secretary, Faiz Ahmed, secretary of the Ministry of Public Administration, Helal Uddin Ahmed, secretary of the Bangladesh Election Commission, Kabir Bin Anwar, secretary of the Ministry of Water Resources, K M Ali Azam, Dhaka Divisional Commissioner, Kazi Nishat Rasul, APS to Prime Minister Sheikh Hasina, and officers from security services.

Haque was appointed secretary of the Ministry of Civil Aviation and Tourism on 16 April 2018. He proposed establishing casinos for foreign tourists. He suspended five employees of Civil Aviation Authority of Bangladesh after an attempt hijacking of a plane. He was a director of Biman Bangladesh Airlines. In January 2020, he received a one year extension as secretary of Biman Bangladesh Airlines, the state-owned national airline of Bangladesh. In 2020, he signed an open sky agreement with the United States, represented by Ambassador Earl R. Miller, on behalf of Bangladesh. In 2022, his name was proposed for the Bangladesh Election Commission.

After the fall of the Sheikh Hasina led Awami League government, Haque was detained in November 2024 from Mohakhali DOHS. Nearly 300 cases were filed against almost 200 thousand former officials and affiliates of the former Awami League government. He was sent to jail by Dhaka additional chief metropolitan magistrate Ziadur Rahman. He was shown arrested in a 8.12 billion BDT corruption case by the Anti-Corruption Commission in January 2025. The charges relate to four projects at three airports including the installation of a radar at the Hazrat Shahjalal International Airport. Also accused in the case was the former military advisor to Prime Minister Sheikh Hasina, Tarique Ahmed Siddique and former joint secretary of the Ministry of Civil Aviation and Tourism, Janendranath Sarkar. He was also charged in the death of a Jubo Dal activist in police action in October 2023.

== Personal life ==
Haque's daughter is a student in the United States.
