= Abul Kalam Azad (doctor) =

Bangladeshi health official

Abul Kalam Azad is a Bangladeshi doctor and who was the Director General of the Directorate General of Health Services during the COVID-19 pandemic. He was a former additional director general of the Directorate General of Health Services.

== Early life ==
Azad was born in 1960 in Nilphamari District, East Pakistan, Pakistan. He completed his MBBS at the Dhaka Medical College.

== Career ==
Azad was additional director general of the Directorate General of Health Services from 2011 to 2016. He founded Sandhani National Eye Donation Society. He was the additional director general of administration at the Directorate General for Health Services.

On 1 September 2016, Azad was appointed the Director General of the Directorate General of Health Services. He replaced Professor Deen Mohd. Noorul Haq. He resigned in July 2020 during the COVID-19 pandemic in Bangladesh after Regent Hospital was caught with fake COVID-19 tests. Azad was criticized for the scam. The directorate had blamed the Ministry of Health for pressuring it to provide a license to Regent Hospital. He was replaced by Abul Bashar Mohammad Khurshid Alam.

Azad was sued in the Regent Hospital scam case. In October 2021, Justice K. M. Emrul Kayesh granted bail to Azad in a case filed over the fake tests by Regent Hospital. The hospital had been scamming patients from the National Institutes of Preventive and Social Medicine.
