= Netrokona-4 =

Constituency of Bangladesh's Jatiya Sangsad

Coordinates: 24.87°N 90.98°E

- Constituency for the Jatiya Sangsad
- District: Netrokona District
- Division: Mymensingh Division
- Electorate: 375,308 (2026)

Current constituency
- Created: 1984
- Party: Bangladesh Nationalist Party
- Member: Lutfozzaman Babar
- ← 159 Netrokona-3 161 Netrokona-5 →

Netrokona-4 is a constituency represented in the Jatiya Sangsad (National Parliament) of Bangladesh since 2026 by Lutfozzaman Babar of the Bangladesh Nationalist Party.

== Boundaries ==
The constituency encompasses Khaliajuri, Madan, and Mohanganj upazilas.

== History ==
The constituency was created in 1984 from constituency Mymensingh-16 when the former Mymensingh District was split into four districts: Mymensingh, Sherpur, Netrokona, and Kishoreganj.

== Members of Parliament ==
Election	Member	Party
1986	Zubed Ali	Awami League
1988	Ali Osman Khan	Jatiya Party (Ershad)
1991	Lutfozzaman Babar	Independent
1996	Lutfozzaman Babar	Bangladesh Nationalist Party
1996	Abdul Momin	Awami League
2001	Lutfozzaman Babar	Bangladesh Nationalist Party
2008	Rebecca Momin	Awami League
2014	Rebecca Momin	Awami League
2018	Rebecca Momin	Awami League
2024	Sajjadul Hassan	Awami League
2026	Lutfozzaman Babar	Bangladesh Nationalist Party

== Elections ==
=== Elections in the 2020s ===
General election 2026: Netrokona-4
Party	Candidate	Votes	%	±%
BNP	Lutfozzaman Babar	160,801	76.62	+75.12
Jamaat	Md. Al Helal Talukder	39,840	18.98	+18.98
Majority		120,961	57.64	+49.44
Turnout		209,872	55.92	−31.18
Registered electors		375,308		
BNP gain from AL				

=== Elections in the 2010s ===
Rebecca Momin was re-elected unopposed in the 2014 general election after opposition parties withdrew their candidacies in a boycott of the election.

=== Elections in the 2000s ===
General Election 2008: Netrokona-4
Party	Candidate	Votes	%	±%
AL	Rebecca Momin	108,725	53.3	+5.0
Independent	Lutfozzaman Babar	91,994	45.1	N/A
BNP	Syed Ataul Haque	3,105	1.5	−49.0
Majority		16,731	8.2	+6.0
Turnout		203,824	87.1	+10.4
AL gain from BNP				

General Election 2001: Netrokona-4
Party	Candidate	Votes	%	±%
BNP	Lutfozzaman Babar	88,651	50.5	+11.0
AL	Abdul Momin	84,800	48.3	−2.7
IJOF	Dewan Shahjahan Eaar Chowdhury	2,169	1.2	N/A
Majority		3,851	2.2	−9.2
Turnout		175,650	76.7	−2.6
BNP gain from AL				

=== Elections in the 1990s ===
General Election June 1996: Netrokona-4
Party	Candidate	Votes	%	±%
AL	Abdul Momin	70,630	51.0	+7.0
BNP	Lutfozzaman Babar	54,795	39.5	−11.0
JP(E)	Md. Sirazul Islam Bachchu	8,160	5.9	+4.2
Jamaat	Shahjahan Abdullah	3,450	2.5	N/A
CPB	Pijus Kanti Talukder	603	0.4	−2.2
Jatiya Samajtantrik Dal-JSD	Rokshana Kaniz	276	0.2	−0.3
BKA	Md. Goyes Ali	265	0.2	N/A
Social Democratic Party	Md. Abdul Momin	222	0.2	N/A
Independent	Md. Razul Hossain	173	0.1	N/A
Majority		15,835	11.4	+4.9
Turnout		138,574	79.3	+22.3
AL gain from BNP				

General Election 1991: Netrokona-4
Party	Candidate	Votes	%	±%
BNP	Lutfozzaman Babar	61,233	50.5	
AL	Abdul Momin	53,338	44.0	
CPB	Bajra Gopal Sarkar	3,191	2.6	
JP(E)	Shamsul Haq Mahbub	2,027	1.7	
Zaker Party	Md. Bajlur Rahman Khan	710	0.6	
Jatiya Samajtantrik Dal-JSD	Golam Ershadur Rahman	647	0.5	
Majority		7,895	6.5	
Turnout		121,146	57.0	
BNP gain from JP(E)				
