= Sezan Mahmud =

Bangladeshi-born American author

- সেজান মাহমুদ
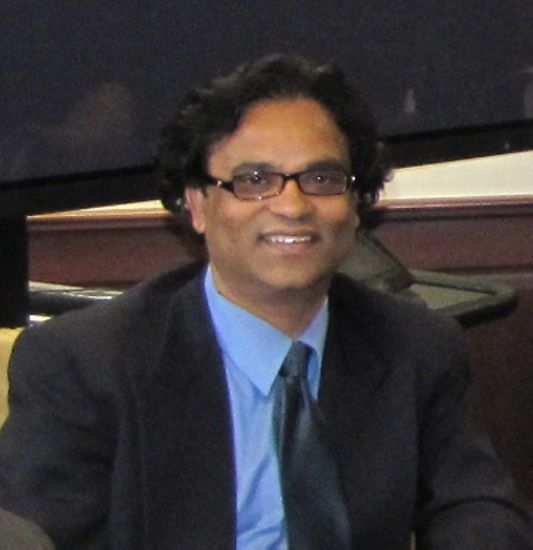
- Sezan Mahmud
- Born: Saleh M. M. Rahman; Sirajganj, Bangladesh
- Education: Sir Salimullah Medical College (MBBS); Harvard University (MPH); University of Alabama at Birmingham (PhD)
- Occupations: Writer, film director, lyricist, columnist, physician by training, professor of public health and medicine
- Writing career
- Years active: 1984-present
- Genres: Magic Realism, documentary, science fiction, science based adventures, children's Literature.

Saleh M. M. Rahman, better known by his pen name Sezan Mahmud, (Bengali: সেজান মাহমুদ) is a Bangladeshi-born American writer, lyricist, columnist and physician-scientist. He was awarded the Shishu Academy Award in 1988. He works as the Associate Dean for Equity, Inclusion, & Diversity, and Professor of Medical Sciences at the Frank H. Netter School of Medicine, Quinnipiac University.

== Education ==
He received his MBBS degree in medicine from Sir Salimullah Medical College, under Dhaka University in 1992, MPH degree from Harvard University School of Public Health in 1997 and PhD from University of Alabama, Birmingham, School of Public Health in 2001. He has completed his IDF fellowship in Endocrinology at Joslin Diabetes Center, Harvard Medical School. He was tenured full professor of Public Health at Florida A&M University and Clinical Research Professor of Medicine at Florida State University, Professor of Medicine and Interim Assistant Dean at the University of Central Florida College of Medicine.

== Research and scholarship ==
Mahmud's scholarly works focus on health equity, social determinants of health, global health, cancer prevention and control, community-based Participatory research (CBPR), health disparities, and emerging infectious diseases. He is one of the researchers who started looking at Social Determinants of Health, including Zip Code, and coined 'Community Economic Status' to measure socioeconomic and environmental disparities in the late 90s. He continued this line of research on GIS-based access to care and travel impediments and the Distress Community Index (DCI) to measure historical disparities and effects of structural racism. He has received numerous research grants, including a multi-million-dollar National Institute of Health (NIH)-funded P20 Center of Excellence for Cancer Research, Training and Community Service grant. Based on his research, he has developed a CBPR-Social Marketing Intersection Model, Behavioral Theoretical Model for Health Services. He has been interviewed as an expert by numerous national and international media, including NPR (National Public Radio), Smashable.com, Voice of America, ATN Bangla, Ekattor TV, Channel I on the COVID-19 pandemic and Ebola Outbreak. He serves as an editorial board member, reviewer of many peer-reviewed journals, and member of professional organizations such as the Association of American Medical Colleges (AAMC), Association for Medical Education in Europe (AMEE), International Association of Medical Science Educators (IAMSE), American Association for Cancer Research (AACR), American Public Health Association (APHA), International Diabetes Federation (IDF), European Association for the Study of Diabetes (EASD), American Association for Diabetes Educator (AADE).

== Literature ==
Sezan Mahmud published his debut novel "AgniBalak" (অগ্নিবালক) in 2009, well received by eminent writers and critics of contemporary Bengali literature. AgniBalak is translated by Fayeza Hasanat and published by Austin Macauley Publishers in 2020, entitled FIRE BORN. His book on the true, untold stories of Naval Commandos in the Bangladesh liberation war (1971), one of the first books on true stories of Liberation war, Operation Jackpot ("অপারেশন জ্যাকপট", ১৯৯১) was translated into English and published in Amazon Kindle version. His contribution to popularize the history of liberation war of Bangladesh to youngsters is noteworthy. His juvenile novel based on the liberation war ('Moner Ghuri Latai', 1992) was retold in the full-length feature film "Gourob" (গৌরব) directed by nationally awarded film director Harunur Rashid. His writing has been selected and included by Bangladesh Text Book Board since 1996 in the sixth grade along with the most eminent writers of Bengali literature.

== Published books ==
=== Compilations ===
- Science Fiction Samagra, Vol. 1 (Sandesh Prokashon, 2019)
- Harvard er Smriti O Onny ek America (Oitijjho Prokashoni, 2016)
- Path Haranor Path, Column Samagra, Vol. 1 (Subarno Prokashoni, 2011)
- Science Based Adventure Samagra, Vol. 1 (Jhingeful Prokashoni, 2010)
- MuktiJuddher Kishor Rachana Samogra, Vol. 1 (Mawla Brothers, 2002) - a compilation of four novels/docu-novels based on the liberation war of Bangladesh

=== Novels and docu-novel on the Liberation war ===
- Fire Born (English Translation) (Austin Macauley Publishers, 2020)
- Ognibalak (Shahittya Prokash, 2009)
- Operation Jackpot [English translation]. Bangla Prokash. 2009. OCLC 796258642.
- Operation Jackpot (in Bengali). Protik Prokashoni. 1991. OCLC 84328727.
- MuktiJudhdher Shera Lorai, (Mohona Prokashoni, 1992) - a docu-commentary of the top ten strategic battles of the liberation war of Bangladesh
- Moner Ghuri Latai (Shahittya Prokash, 1992) - a juvenile novel based on liberation war of Bangladesh
- Kala Kuthuri (Mawla Brothers, 2002) - a drama-novel on the liberation war of Bangladesh and the collaborators

=== Science fiction ===
- Debdut Manush (Sandesh Prokashon, 2019)
- Manusher Modhdhe Manush (Bangla Prokash, 2014)
- Cosmic Sangeet (Bangla Prokash, 2014)
- Lethe (Biddhya Prokash, 2012)
- Ayuskal O Trimilar Prem (Abasor Prokashoni, 2010)

=== Short stories ===
- Haram O Onnyano Galpa (Mawla Brothers, 2011)
- Project Vutong Adhunikong (Agami Prokashoni, 2002)

=== Science-based adventure novels ===
- Tushar Manab (Iceman) (Shahittaya Prokash, 1994)
- Deep Pahare Atongka (Ankur Prokashoni, 1992)

=== Feature ===
- Bishsher Shreshtha Dosh Ovijatri (Shahittya Prokash, 1992)

=== Rhymes ===
- Chhoray Chhoray Science Fiction (Agami Prokashoni, 2010) -Collection of science fiction rhymes.
- Habijabi (1st edition, Dinratri Prokashoni, 1988, 2nd edition, Auninday Prokashoni, 1992, 3rd edition, Agami Prokashoni, 2010)- collection of juvenile rhymes
- Palte Shudhu Lebas (Shoilee Prokashoni, 1992) -Collection of political rhymes

=== Edited books ===
- Kishor Rahashshay Galpo (Dinratri Prokashoni, 1988)
- Nirbachito Kishor Rahashshay Galpo (Kakoli Prokashoni, 1992, Second edition, 2005)
- Chokh Firiye Dekhi (1992)

== Published Songs (Selected) ==
- Nelson Mandela, Artist: Fakir Alamgir, Lyrics and Tuned by Sezan Mahmud, Album, Mandela, 1987.
- Kono Ek Sundory Raate, Artist: Samina Chowdhury, Lyrics: Sezan Mahmud, Music: Ashikuzzaman Tulu, Album, Stars, 1992.
- Elomelo Chul ar Lolater Bhaj, Artist: Kanak Chapa, Lyrics: Sezan Mahmud, Music: Mainul Islam Khan, BTV, 1984.
- Shohor Theke Ektu Dure Cholna, Artist: James, Naquib Khan, Hamin Ahmed, Shafin Ahmed, Pilu. Lyrics: Sezan Mahmud, Music: Naquib Khan. BTV, 1992.
- Ami Noi Shei Bonolata Sen, Artist: Kanak Chapa, Lyrics: Sezan Mahmud, Music:Mainul Islam Khan, BTV, 1985.

== Filmography ==
- Lashkata Ghar, a documentary film on the people called Dom (considered lower cast and untouchable) written and directed by Sezan Mahmud, has received 2014 Honorable Mention Award at the Richmond International Film Festival.
- Script for "Gourob" based on his novel "Moner Ghuri Latai", Directed by nationally awarded director Harunur Rashid, Produced by Bangladesh Shishu Academy (1998)

== Awards in literature ==
- Bangladesh Shishu Academy Award, (1988)
- Our Pride Award (2005) given by Bangladesh-American Foundation Inc.

== Awards in professional works ==
- Global Corporate Award in Science and Academia (2014)
