= Abul Bashar Mohammed Khurshid Alam =

Bangladeshi surgeon

- আবুল বাশার মোহাম্মদ খুরশীদ আলম

Director General of Directorate General of Health Services
- In office 23 July 2020 – 19 August 2024
- Preceded by: Abul Kalam Azad
- Succeeded by: Md Abu Jafor

Personal details
- Education: Sir Salimullah Medical College

Abul Bashar Mohammed Khurshid Alam is a Bangladeshi surgeon and a former director general of the Directorate General of Health Services of Bangladesh.

== Education ==
Alam passed MBBS from Sir Salimullah Medical College. He obtained FCPS in surgery from Bangladesh College of Physicians and Surgeons and MS in Orthopedic Surgery. He also achieved FRCS from Royal College of Surgeons of England.

== Career ==
Alam was long serving head of the department of surgery at Comilla Medical College. He was head of surgery at Dhaka Medical College until he took the job as director general. He also worked as honorary secretary of Bangladesh College of Physicians and Surgeons.
