= Somen Chanda =

Bengali marxist writer

- সোমেন চন্দ
- Born: 24 May 1920; Narsingdi, Bengal Presidency, British India
- Died: 8 March 1942 (aged 21); Dacca, Bengal Presidency, British India
- Education: Sir Salimullah Medical College
- Occupations: Marxist activist, writer, trade union leader
- Writing career
- Language: Bengali

Somen Chanda (Bengali: সোমেন চন্দ; 24 May 1920 – 8 March 1942) was a Marxist activist, writer and trade union leader of Bengal.

== Early life ==
Somen Chanda was born in Narsingdi District, British India in 1920. In 1936 he passed Entrance examination from Pogose School and entered in Mitford Medical School (now Sir Salimullah Medical College) in Dacca. He was attracted to marxist politics and trade union movement in student life.

== Literary works ==
Chanda joined in Progressive Writers' Association or Pragati Lekhak Sangha and anti fascist activism in Dhaka. He wrote his first novel Banya while he was 17. He wrote number of short stories, drama and articles in their literary journals which were collectively published posthumously. His stories were translated in many languages.

== Death ==
While leading a rally of workers of East Bengal Railway organised by the Soviet Suhrid Samity in Dhaka, Chanda was attacked by some hooligans and killed brutally on 8 March 1942.
