= Akhlakul Hossain Ahmed =

Bangladeshi politician (1926–2012)

- আখলাকুল হোসাইন আহমেদ
- Born: 15 October 1926; Netrokona, Bengal Presidency, British India
- Died: 28 August 2012 (aged 85); Dhaka, Bangladesh
- Occupations: Physician, politician
- Political party: Bangladesh Awami League
- Children: Obaidul Hassan; Sajjadul Hassan

Akhlakul Hossain Ahmed (15 October 1926 – 28 August 2012) was a Bangladeshi physician and politician from Netrokona belonging to Bangladesh Awami League. He was elected as a member of the East Pakistan Provincial Assembly in 1970. After the Liberation of Bangladesh, he was appointed as a member of the Constituent Assembly of Bangladesh. He was an organizer of the Liberation War of Bangladesh.

== Career ==
Ahmed was born on 15 October 1926 at Chhayashi in Mohanganj of Netrokona. He was elected as a member of the East Pakistan Provincial Assembly Mohanganj-Barhatta constituency in 1970. During the Liberation War of Bangladesh he was the in-charge of Maheshkhola Youth Camp in Tura, Meghalaya in India. He was appointed as a member of the Constituent Assembly of Bangladesh after the Liberation of Bangladesh.

Ahmed died on 28 August 2012 at Holy Cross Hospital in Dhaka at the age of 85.
