= Bangladesh Medical College =

Medical school in Dhaka

- বাংলাদেশ মেডিকেল কলেজ
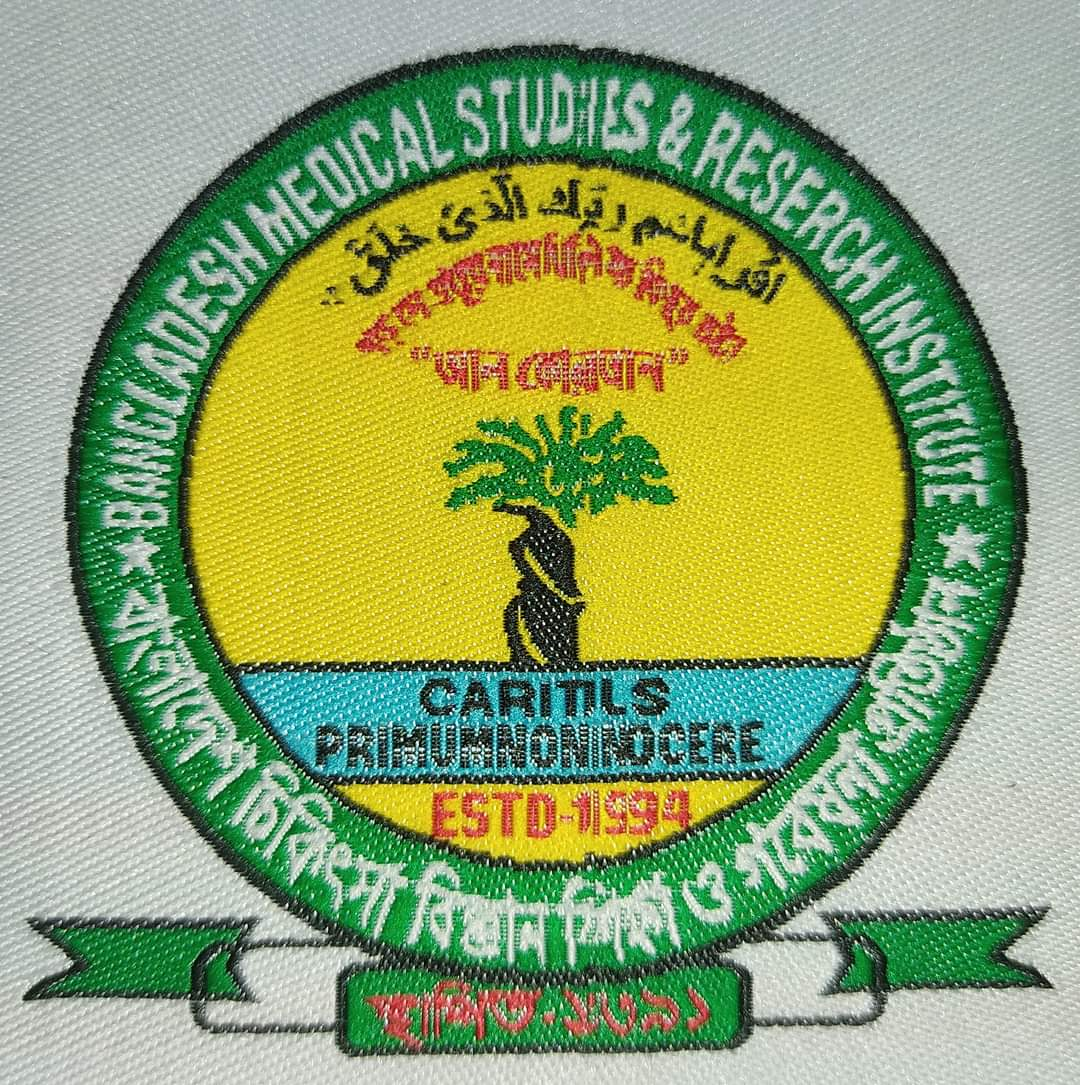
- Emblem of Bangladesh Medical College
- Motto: Latin: Caritas; Primum non nocere
- Motto in English: Charity; First, do no harm
- Type: Private Medical School Medical College & Hospital
- Established: 1986; 40 years ago
- Academic affiliations: University of Dhaka
- Principal: Mohammad Jalaluddin Iqbal
- Academic staff: 148 (2015)
- Location: Dhanmondi, Dhaka, Bangladesh; 23.7503°N 90.3699°E
- Campus: Urban
- Language: English
- Nickname: BMC
- Website: bmc-bd.org

Bangladesh Medical College (BMC; Bengali: বাংলাদেশ মেডিকেল কলেজ) is the oldest private medical college in Bangladesh. It was established in 1986. The college is located in Dhanmondi, Dhaka. It is one of the constituent colleges of the University of Dhaka.

It offers a five-year course of study leading to a Bachelor of Medicine, Bachelor of Surgery (MBBS) degree.

The college is attached to the 500-bed Bangladesh Medical College Hospital.

== Undergraduate course ==
A combined medical admission test for the MBBS course is held every year under the supervision of DGHS. 139,217 students, who were eligible, sat for the entrance exams in 2023. Students who have passed the Higher Secondary School Certificate or equivalent examinations with the required grades can apply for the admission test. Every year, only 120 domestic and foreign students get admission to the MBBS course at Bangladesh Medical College.

The qualified candidates, according to their preferences, get the opportunity to study at Bangladesh Medical College. Foreign candidates from different countries are selected by DGHS and MOHFW as per required qualifications.

The college runs a 5-year MBBS course according to the curriculum developed by BMDC. A student studies anatomy, physiology, biochemistry, pathology, pharmacology, microbiology, forensic medicine, community medicine, medicine & allied subjects, surgery & allied subjects, and gynecology & obstetrics during the course period.

The course is divided into 4 phases. Four professional examinations, one at the end of each phase, are held under the University of Dhaka. After passing the fourth or final professional examination, a student is awarded an MBBS degree. Course curriculum follows percentage system grading. The pass mark for the college's internal as well as professional examinations is 60 percent. Students shall have to pass written (MCQ + SAQ + formative), oral, practical, and clinical examinations separately. A one-year internship after graduation is compulsory for all graduates. The degree is recognised by the Bangladesh Medical and Dental Council.

== History ==
Bangladesh Medical College is the first non-government private medical school in Bangladesh. The University of Dhaka granted affiliation in 1988.

The founder members dreamt of establishing a medical college and hospital with the aim of imparting medical education, and after much talk and discussion, Bangladesh Medical College was established on 13 April 1986.

== Campus ==
The college is located in Dhanmondi Thana, Dhaka. The college's six-story academic building is attached to a six-story, 500-bed teaching hospital, Bangladesh Medical College Hospital.

== Organisation and administration ==
The college is affiliated with Dhaka University as a constituent college. The founder chairman of the college was the late Mohammad Yusuf Ali. The founder principal was the late A.H.M. Samsul Haque.

== Academics ==
The college offers a five-year course of study, approved by the Bangladesh Medical and Dental Council (BMDC), leading to a Bachelor of Medicine, Bachelor of Surgery (MBBS) degree from Dhaka University. After passing the final professional examination, there is a compulsory one-year internship. The internship is a prerequisite for obtaining registration from the BMDC to practice medicine. In October 2014, the Ministry of Health and Family Welfare capped admission and tuition fees at private medical colleges at 1,990,000 Bangladeshi taka (US$25,750 as of 2014) total for their five-year courses.

Admission for Bangladeshis to the MBBS programme at all medical colleges in Bangladesh (government and private) is conducted centrally by the Directorate General of Health Services (DGHS). It administers a written multiple-choice question exam simultaneously throughout the country. Candidates are admitted based primarily on their score on this test, although grades at the Secondary School Certificate (SSC) and Higher Secondary School Certificate (HSC) level also play a part. Seats are reserved, according to quotas set by the Directorate General of Health Services (DGHS), for children of Freedom Fighters and for students from underprivileged backgrounds. Currently, the college is allowed to admit 120 students annually.

== Journal ==
Bangladesh Medical College Journal is the official journal of the college. It is a peer-reviewed, open access journal published semi-annually. It accepts original research articles, review articles on topics of current interest, and interesting case reports.

== See also ==
- List of medical colleges in Bangladesh
