= Bangladesh National Commission for UNESCO =

Government agency of Bangladesh

- Formation: 1973
- Headquarters: 1, Sonargaon Road, Dhaka, Bangladesh
- Region served: Bangladesh
- Official language: Bengali
- Website: www.bncu.gov.bd

The Bangladesh National Commission for UNESCO (Bengali: বাংলাদেশ ইউনেস্কো জাতীয় কমিশন) is a Bangladesh government regulatory agency under the Ministry of Education responsible for coordinating development activities with UNESCO and other developments agencies and non-profits. Dipu Moni is the chairperson of the Bangladesh National Commission for UNESCO. Md. Mahbub Hossain is the General Secretary of the commission.

== History ==
The Bangladesh National Commission for UNESCO was established in 1973. The chairman of the commission is the Minister of Education.

On 2 June 2014, Bangladesh National Commission for UNESCO, along with UNESCO and Save the Children, released a report titled Education For All Global Monitoring Report-2013/14 as part of achieving Education for All.

On 8 March 2015, Bangladesh National Commission for UNESCO and Korean National Commission for UNESCO organised an exhibition on Jamdani in Dhaka.
