= Ali Osman Khan =

Bangladeshi politician (died 2021)

Member of Bangladesh Parliament
- In office 18 February 1979 – 12 February 1982

Personal details
- Born: 1946 or 1947
- Died: 2 July 2021 (aged 74)
- Party: Bangladesh Nationalist Party

Ali Osman Khan (Bengali: আলী ওসমান খান; 1946/7 – 2 July 2021) was a politician of the Bangladesh Nationalist Party and a member of parliament for Mymensingh-17 (present Netrokona-3).

== Career ==
Khan was elected to parliament from Mymensingh-17 as a Bangladesh Nationalist Party candidate in 1979.

== Death ==
Khan died on 2 July 2021 at Bangladesh Medical College Hospital, Dhaka.
