= Robert Mitford (colonial official) =

Robert Mitford (c.1782–1836) was a British colonial official in Bengal whose endowment created the Mitford Hospital.

== Early life ==
Mitford was born in about 1782 in England to the Mitford family of Northumberland.

== Career ==
Mitford joined the East India Company when he was 16 years old as a writer. He was placed in the Bengal Civil administration and served in Murshidabad, Kolkata, and Bihar.

On 9 September 1816, Mitford was appointed the tax collector of Dhaka District. He served for four years as the tax collector before applying for the position in the East India Company Judicial service. He was appointed second judge to the Dhaka Provincial Court of Appeal and Circuit in 1822. He served in the court till his retirement on 20 May 1828.

Mitford returned to England in 1828. He bagan an affair with Marry Appoline, a French woman, while his marriage to Elizabeth deteriorated.

== Personal life ==
Mitford married Elizabeth Anne Pattle, daughter of Thomas Pattle and Sarah Pattle, in Murshidabad on 30 May 1804. Elizabeth died on 9 May 1859.

== Death and legacy ==
On 21 September 1836, Mitford died in Paris while on holiday. In his will he stated that after all obligations had been fulfilled the remainder of his estate was to be donated to the government of Bengal to benefit the native people. His wife, Elizabeth Anne Pattle, and his mistress, Marry Appoline, both challenged the will in court. The Chancery Division of the High Court of Justice upheld the will after some legal battle.

The endowment created the Mitford Bequest Fund with almost 18 thousand pounds. The Governor General of India, James Broun-Ramsay, 1st Marquess of Dalhousie, decided to use the fund to establish a hospital in Dhaka modeled after Western hospitals. This led to the creation of Mitford Hospital, opening in 1858. It became the most important medical institution in East Bengal and Assam during colonial rule.
