= Licentiate in Medicine and Surgery =

Medical degree

Licentiate in Medicine and Surgery (also known as Licentiate in Medical Practice in some instances) is a medical degree of historical importance in India. During the British rule of India some universities conferred this qualification.

== Madras Presidency ==
=== 1921 ===
The qualification for admission in L.M.P course in Madras Presidency were

- 40% of mark or above in English
- 40% of marks or above of averages in all subjects in the Presidency

Criteria for dismissal from course included failure in same board examination three times.

The course duration was for four years.

== Course ==
The qualification was conferred on a candidate who, having completed a five-year course, passed the required examination. This was in contrast with the MB degree which was of same duration but the curriculum was larger. Bhore committee, a committee for public health improvement strategies, in 1946 decided to stop the LMS (or, LMP) degree, and recommended a single qualification for all doctors (MBBS). The qualification was known by some other names in some of the states/universities, such as Licentiate of Medical Faculty (LMF).

The L.M.S. was also previously conferred in other former British colonies such as Ceylon, Malaysia and Singapore. The name of the degree has been adopted to Finland, where physicians usually hold the L.M. instead of M.D.
