= Directorate General of Health Services (Bangladesh) =

Government organization in Dhaka, Bangladesh

- স্বাস্থ্য অধিদপ্তর
- Crest of Directorate General of Health Services
- Abbreviation: DGHS
- Formation: 1978
- Type: Government Agency
- Location: Mohakhali, Dhaka, Bangladesh
- Region served: Bangladesh
- Parent organization: Ministry of Health and Family Welfare
- Website: dghs.gov.bd

The Directorate General of Health Services (DGHS) (Bengali: স্বাস্থ্য অধিদপ্তর) is a Bangladeshi government directorate under the Ministry of Health and Family Welfare responsible for health services in Bangladesh.

== History ==
The DGHS was established as a directorate in 1978. It was upgraded to a directorate general in 1980.

On 23 January 2019, the Anti-Corruption Commission began investigating 23 officers at the DGHS for corruption and recommended their transfers.

Director General of DGHS Abul Kalam Azad resigned on 22 July 2020 after Regent Hospital was raided for providing fake COVID-19-free certificates. The hospital was shut down by the DGHS on 8 July after a raid by the Rapid Action Battalion. The DGHS and the Ministry of Health and Family Welfare traded blame over the Regent Hospital scandal. The DGHS signed a memorandum of understanding with Regent Hospital in March 2020, and the signing ceremony was attended by Minister of Health and Family Welfare Zahid Maleque. Another organization issuing fake COVID-19 certificates was JKG Healthcare. Officials at The DGHS requested JKG Healthcare to submit a proposal to collect COVID-19 samples for a scheme to siphon off from the 5 billion emergency COVID-19 fund. CEO of JKG Healthcare, Ariful Chaudhury and his wife and chairperson of JKG, Sabrina Arif Chaudhury, were arrested by police for issuing fake COVID-19 certificates.

Abul Bashar Mohammed Khurshid Alam is appointed as director general on 23 July 2020. Alam criticised media coverage on the healthcare system and the Ministry of Health and Family Welfare. The Anti-Corruption Commission arrested Abzal Hossain, who worked for the Institute of Health Technology of the DGHS. The Commission found 2.84 billion taka in his and his wife's accounts. Khurshid Alam tested positive for COVID-19 in March 2021.

DGHS claimed in December 2020 that Bangladesh will receive 68 million vaccines for the COVID-19 pandemic in Bangladesh from GAVI under COVAX and an additional 30 million from Serum Institute of India.

== Function ==
The primary functions of the directorate are: ensuring healthcare services at all levels across the country, managing health services, formulating action plans, and implementing various policies. Additionally, the directorate provides technical support to the ministry in formulating guidelines related to healthcare services when necessary.

Although the Directorate previously oversaw health education, a notification was issued on November 24, 2019, establishing a separate Directorate General of Medical Education.

== Controversies ==
Malek started working as a driver in the DGHS in 1982. He came to prominence after Syed Modasser Ali became director general of the DGHS as his close aid. In 2009, he worked as the personal driver of the director general of the DGHS, Shah Monir Hossain. He lobbied for 100 assistant director posts in Upazilas of Bangladesh. He made a few billion taka and provided a percentage to Shah Monir Hossain. Hossain was replaced by Khondokar Md Shefayetullah as director general of the DGHS. Shafeyetullah created a canteen for third- and fourth-class employees of the directorate, which Malek turned into his personal office. Malek then worked as the personal driver of AHM Enayet Hossain, additional director general of the DGHS. Enayet was made director general of the Directorate General of Medical Education, and Malek was transferred; he still continued to work for Enayet.

Malek maintained close relations with President of Bangladesh Medical Association Mustafa Jalal Mohiuddin. Malek was detained in September 2020 by Rapid Action Battalion. He was suspended by the DGHS following his arrest. Their investigation revealed that he had accumulated around 10 billion taka. Malek was known as the shadow director general of the DGHS. He also used to maintain a good relationship with Swadhinata Chikitshak Parishad. Directorate General of Medical Education and AHM Enayet Hossain denied any involvement with Malek in an official statement. In February 2021, the Anti-Corruption Commission sued Malek for hiding information on his wealth, and another case was filed against him and his wife for possessing wealth beyond their known source of income. In March 2021, Malek was charged with possessing illegal weapons and ammunition by a tribunal in Dhaka.

== Organogram ==
The office is led by the director general (DG). He is assisted by two additional director generals (ADG), directors, line directors, deputy directors, other officers & supporting staff.
