= Medical Education and Family Welfare Division =

Government agency in Bangladesh

Medical Education And Family Welfare Division
- স্বাস্থ্য শিক্ষা ও পরিবার কল্যাণ বিভাগ
- Government Seal of Bangladesh

Agency overview
- Formed: 2017
- Jurisdiction: Government of Bangladesh
- Website: mefwd.gov.bd

The Medical Education And Family Welfare Division (স্বাস্থ্য শিক্ষা ও পরিবার কল্যাণ বিভাগ) is a Bangladeshi government division under the Ministry of Health and Family Welfare, responsible for family planning and medical education in Bangladesh. Md. Saiful Hassan Badal is the government secretary in charge of the division.

== History ==
In the 1970s, the Ministry of Health and Family Welfare had two divisions but they were combined in 1985 for efficiency. On 16 March 2017, the government of Bangladesh established the Medical Education And Family Welfare Division and Health Service Division through the bifurcation of the Ministry of Health and Family Welfare.

== Organogram ==
- Directorate General of Medical Education
- Directorate General of Nursing and Midwifery
- National Institute of Population Research and Training
- Directorate General of Family Planning
