= Shahidul Alam Jhinuk =

Bangladeshi judge

Information Commission
- In office 24 August 2023 – 05 September 2024

Personal details
- Occupation: Bangladeshi judge

Shahidul Alam Jhinuk is a retired judge and Commissioner of the Information Commission. He is the former Inspector General of Registration of Bangladesh. He is the former registrar of International Crimes Tribunal.

== Career ==
Jhinuk joined the judicial branch of the Bangladesh Civil Service through the 10th Bangladesh Civil Service exam in 1991.

Jhinuk was the senior assistant judge in Comilla District, Dhaka District, and Feni District.

In 2003, Jhinuk was promoted to joint district judge. In 2007, he was promoted to additional district and sessions judge.

Jhinuk was the deputy secretary of the Law and Justice Division. In 2015, he was promoted to District Judge. He was appointed the registrar of International Crimes Tribunal in June 2015 replacing Mustafizur Rahman. He was serving as the Dhaka Special Court-3 Judge. He signed the death warrant for Mir Quasem Ali. He signed the death warrant for Motiur Rahman Nizami and Salauddin Quader Chowdhury.

Jhinuk was appointed District Judge of Sunamganj District in July 2017. Md Selim Miah replaced him as the registrar of International Crimes Tribunal.

In October 2018, Jhinuk, Manikganj District and Sessions Judge, sentenced four to death and one to life imprisonment for the murder of a Khan Bahadur Awlad Hossain College student after he was kidnapped for ransom.

In January 2020, Jhinuk was appointed the Inspector General of Registration in charge of the Directorate of Registration. In July 2020, the Directorate of Registration under him collected 6.9 billion BDT.

In August 2023, Jhinuk was appointed Commissioner of the Information Commission along with Masuda Bhatti under Chief Information Commissioner Dr. Abdul Malek. He visited the shrine of Sheikh Mujibur Rahman in Tungipara after his appointment.
