= Pharmacy Council of Bangladesh =

Regulatory body of pharmacy education and profession in Bangladesh

- Formation: 1976; 50 years ago
- Headquarters: Rahat Tower (5th Floor) 14 Link Road, West Banglamotor, Dhaka-1000, Bangladesh
- Region served: Bangladesh
- Official language: Bengali and English
- Website: Pharmacy Council of Bangladesh

Pharmacy Council of Bangladesh (PCB) is the organization established under the Ministry of Health and Family Welfare Bangladesh as a regulatory body for pharmacy education and profession. PCB training and registration is compulsory for people selling medicine.

== History ==
The Bangladesh Pharmacy Council was established as a separate part of the Health Services Division of Ministry of Health and Family Welfare Bangladesh in 1976, which was later reorganized as the Pharmacy Act 2013.

== Aims and objectives ==
This is stated as the aim of the institution -

Pharmacy education is conducted in such public and private educational institutions through the development of good governance and management to achieve excellence in higher education and innovative research, to ensure the provision of overall facilities to universities and institutes of health technologies to build a sustainable socio-economic development and knowledge-based economy.

== Program ==
The Bangladesh Pharmacy Council was established as a separate part of the Health Services Department of (Ministry of Health and Family Welfare (Bangladesh)) in 1976, which was later reorganized in the Pharmacy Act 2013.

- Formulation of strategic plans regarding educational programs of pharmacy educational institutions and higher level pharmacy education in Bangladesh.
- Formulation of policies aimed at improving the quality of relevant aspects of educational programs in government and private educational institutions where pharmacy education is conducted for sustainable socio-economic development.
- Formulating policies aimed at ensuring emerging pharmaceutical technologies and establishing infrastructure for innovative research in universities.
- Encouraging interaction between universities and pharmaceutical industry institutions for national development.
- Formulating policies aimed at expanding and improving the quality of the pharmacy profession in the field of medicine in Bangladesh.

== Role in public health ==
According to the prevailing rules in Bangladesh, it is mandatory to have a drug license from the Directorate General of Drug Administration and a certificate of completion of the pharmacist course from the Bangladesh Pharmacy Council to set up any kind of pharmacy.

== Course and certification ==
Three types of courses are conducted by PCB; Category A for undergraduate level, Category B for diploma certificate courses of one to three years duration, and Category C for three-month courses. The Bangladesh Pharmacy Council grants certificates after completion of various training and education in pharmacy from various educational institutions of the country.

From 2005 to 2007, the council also awarded certificates to B.Pharm graduates who passed an examination set by the council. The council stopped awarding certificates in this fashion after the legality of the process became embroiled in litigation. Starting in 2014, the government ordered the council to grant certificates to graduates without an exam by the council.

== See also ==
- Directorate General of Drug Administration
