= Masuda Bhatti =

Bangladeshi journalist

- মাসুদা ভাট্টি

Information Commission
- In office 24 August 2023 – 20 January 2025

Personal details
- Born: 1973 (age 52–53)
- Occupation: Journalist

Masuda Bhatti (born 1973) is a Bangladeshi journalist who was a Commissioner of the Information Commission. She was removed from her post on 21 January 2025 after allegations of serious misconduct against her were proven. Bhatti was known for filing a defamation lawsuit against Barrister Mainul Hosein who is connected with the opposition Bangladesh Nationalist Party and editor of New Nation daily and Daily Ittefaq.

== Early life ==
Bhatti was born in 1973 in Faridpur District.

== Career ==
In 2007, Bhatti worked as a journalist based in London. She worked as the executive editor of a weekly newspaper in London. She had contributed to Ajker Kagoj, Janomot, Moscow Time, and Prothom Alo.

Bhatti was working as a columnist in 2010.

Barrister Mainul Hosein made insulting comments about Bhatti in a television show in 2018. Additional Chief Metropolitan Magistrate Md Kaisarul Islam sent Hosein to jail in October in nine defamation cases filed over the incident including one by Bhatti. Hosein was sued under the Digital Security Act.

In August 2023, Bhatti was appointed Information Commissioner of Bangladesh along with retired District and Sessions Judge Shahidul Alam Jhinuk. She replaced Suraiya Begum. They will serve under chief information commissioner Dr Abdul Malek.
