= Khurshida Begum Sayeed =

Former Commissioner of the Information Commission of Bangladesh

Khurshida Begum Sayeed is a former commissioner of the Information Commission of Bangladesh, with the rank of a secretary of the government. She is a professor of government and politics at Jahangirnagar University.

== Early life ==
Sayeed was born on 1 January 1953 in Rajbari District, East Pakistan, Pakistan. She graduated from Shiddeshwari Girls High School and Holy Cross Girls' High School in 1967 and 1969. She completed her bachelor's degree and master's in political science from University of Dhaka in 1973 and 1975 respectively. She completed her PhD in 1985 from Heidelberg University. Her thesis was on the Farakka Barrage.

== Career ==
Sayeed joined the Family Development Services and Research in 1986 as a researcher. From 1986 to 1991, she was an assistant professor at the department of government and politics at Jahangirnagar University.

Sayeed became an associate professor in 1991 and a full professor in 1999.

In 2013, Sayeed was appointed a member of the board of advisors of the Ministry of Textiles and Jute. She was a member of the Bangladesh delegation to the 13th Session of the Permanent Forum on Indigenous Issues in May 2014. She was appointed commissioner of the Information Commission on 28 September 2014. She served under chief commissioner Ambassador Mohammed Farooq and professor Md. Golam Rahman.

Sayeed sat at hearing of the Information Commission and found against government officers and fined them monetarily. She served alongside fellow commissioner, Nepal Chandra Sarker. In February 2016, she fined the officer in charge of Bhatara Police Station for failing to disclose requested information to a member of the public in the prescribed timeframe. She said that a culture of transparency was needed for the right to information act to be implemented.

Sayeed is a contributing author of Banglapedia.
