= Pocket Hercules =

Pocket Hercules may refer to:

- Naim Süleymanoğlu (1967-2017), Bulgarian-born Turkish World and Olympic Champion in weightlifting
- Maurice Jones-Drew (born 1985), American football player
- Darren Sproles (born 1983), American football player
- Manohar Aich (1912–2016), Indian bodybuilder
