= Institute of Child and Mother Health =

Medical research institute in Bangladesh

Coordinates: 23.6937°N 90.4664°E

- শিশু ও মাতৃস্বাস্থ্য ইনস্টিটিউট
- Logo of Institute of Child and Mother Health
- Abbreviation: ICMH
- Formation: 1992
- Headquarters: Matuail, Dhaka
- Location: Bangladesh
- Region served: Bangladesh
- Official language: Bengali and English
- Executive Director: Brigadier General Md. Emdadul Haque
- Parent organization: Ministry of Health
- Website: www.icmh.org.bd

The Institute of Child and Mother Health (ICMH) is a research institute that seeks to improve the children and mother's health sector in Bangladesh. It situated in Matuail, Dhaka.

== History ==
It operates under the Bangladesh government's Ministry of Health and Family Welfare (MOHFW) and was established in 1992, funded jointly by the Bangladesh government (42%) and the World Bank (58%) (the estimated cost was BDT658 million).

== Faculty ==
- Department of Paediatrics
- Paediatric Surgery
- Anaesthesiology
- Center for Training & Communication (CTC)
- Obstetrics & Gynaecology
- Radiology & Imaging
- Laboratory Medicine
- Epidemiology & Biostatistics

=== Academic courses ===
- MD (Paediatrics)
- MS (Gynaecology)
- Early Childhood Development (ECD)
- Diploma in Child Health (DCH)
- Diploma in Gynaecology & Obstetrics (DGO)
- Diploma in Midwifery
