= Jagannath University =

Public university in Sadarghat, Bangladesh

- জগন্নাথ বিশ্ববিদ্যালয়
- Other name: জবি/JnU
- Former names: Jagannath School (1858–1884), Jagannath College (1884–2005)
- Motto: শিক্ষা, ঈমান, শৃঙ্খলা
- Motto in English: Education, Faith, Discipline
- Type: Public
- Established: 1858; 168 years ago (As School), 1884; 142 years ago (As College), 2005; 21 years ago (As University)
- Founders: Dinanath Sen; Prabhaticharan Roy; Anathbandhu Mallik; Brajasundar Kaitra
- Accreditation: UGC; PCB
- Budget: ৳186.61 crore (US$15 million) (2026-27)
- Chancellor: President of Bangladesh
- Vice-Chancellor: Md. Rais Uddin
- Faculty: 960
- Administrative staff: 850
- Students: 19,088
- Location: Dhaka, Bangladesh; 23°42′37″N 90°24′40″E
- Campus: 210 acres (85 ha) (total); Urban (10 acres), Keraniganj, Dhaka (200 acres, under construction)
- Website: jnu.ac.bd

University rankings

Global – Overall
- THE World: 1501+ (2026)

Regional – Overall
- QS Asia: 1101-1200 (2026)

Jagannath University (JnU) (Bengali: জগন্নাথ বিশ্ববিদ্যালয়) is a public university located in Sadarghat, Dhaka, Bangladesh. Founded as Dhaka Brahma School in 1858 and renamed Jagannath School in 1872, and later renamed Jagannath College in 1884, the institution was taken over by the Pakistani government in 1968, while Bangladesh was still a part of Pakistan. It opened graduate and post-graduate programmes in 1975 and was approved as a full public university in 2005.

In 2022, Jagannath University opened its first residential hall, for female residents only. The university is in the southern part of Dhaka city near the River Buriganga and a new campus of approximately 81 ha (200 acres) is being built at Keraniganj. Total campus area is more than 85 ha (210 acres) with three campuses and a women's residence hall.

== History ==
Dinanath Sen, Prabhaticharan Roy, Anathbandhu Mallik, and Brajasundar Kaitra founded Dhaka Brahma School in 1858, and the university's history began there. The name Jagannath School was given by Kishorilal Roy Chowdhury, the Zamindar of Baliati in Manikganj, who took over the school in 1872 and renamed it after his father.

In 1884, it was raised to a second-grade college. Law was one of the first courses introduced. A common management committee administered the school and college until 1887, when the school section was separated to form the independent Kishore Jubilee School, now known as K. L. Jubilee School. The college administration was transferred to a board of trustees in 1907. In the following year, it became a first-grade college.

The college started with 48 students. In five years, the roll rose to 396. In 1910, Raja Manmath Roy Chowdhury, the Zamindar of Santosh, Tangail, affiliated the Pramath-Manmath College of Tangail with Jagannath College. With the establishment of the University of Dhaka in 1921, it stopped admission to degree courses and was renamed Jagannath Intermediate College. This status was changed after 28 years in 1949 when it reopened degree classes. The college was taken over by the government in 1968.

Jagannath College opened honours and masters programmes in 1975. That year, the government took over it again and transformed it into a postgraduate college. In 1982, the college closed its programmes at the intermediate level. It introduced evening shifts in 1992.

It was transformed into Jagannath University in 2005 by passage in the national parliament of the Jagannath University Act-2005.

== Ranking ==
In 2022, The ranking position of Jagannath University is 3399. While the top position from Bangladesh is 1468, the Department of Chemistry ranked 1st among all the universities of Bangladesh according to SCIMAGO Institution ranking. (All information is updated in July 2022 edition)

== Academics ==
Jagannath University has 36 departments under seven faculties and two Institutes. Every department follows the semester system. As of November 2020 there are 960 teachers and 19,088 students in Honours, Masters, M.Phil. and Ph.D. programmes.

== Faculties ==
There are seven faculties, 38 departments, and two institutes at Jagannath University.

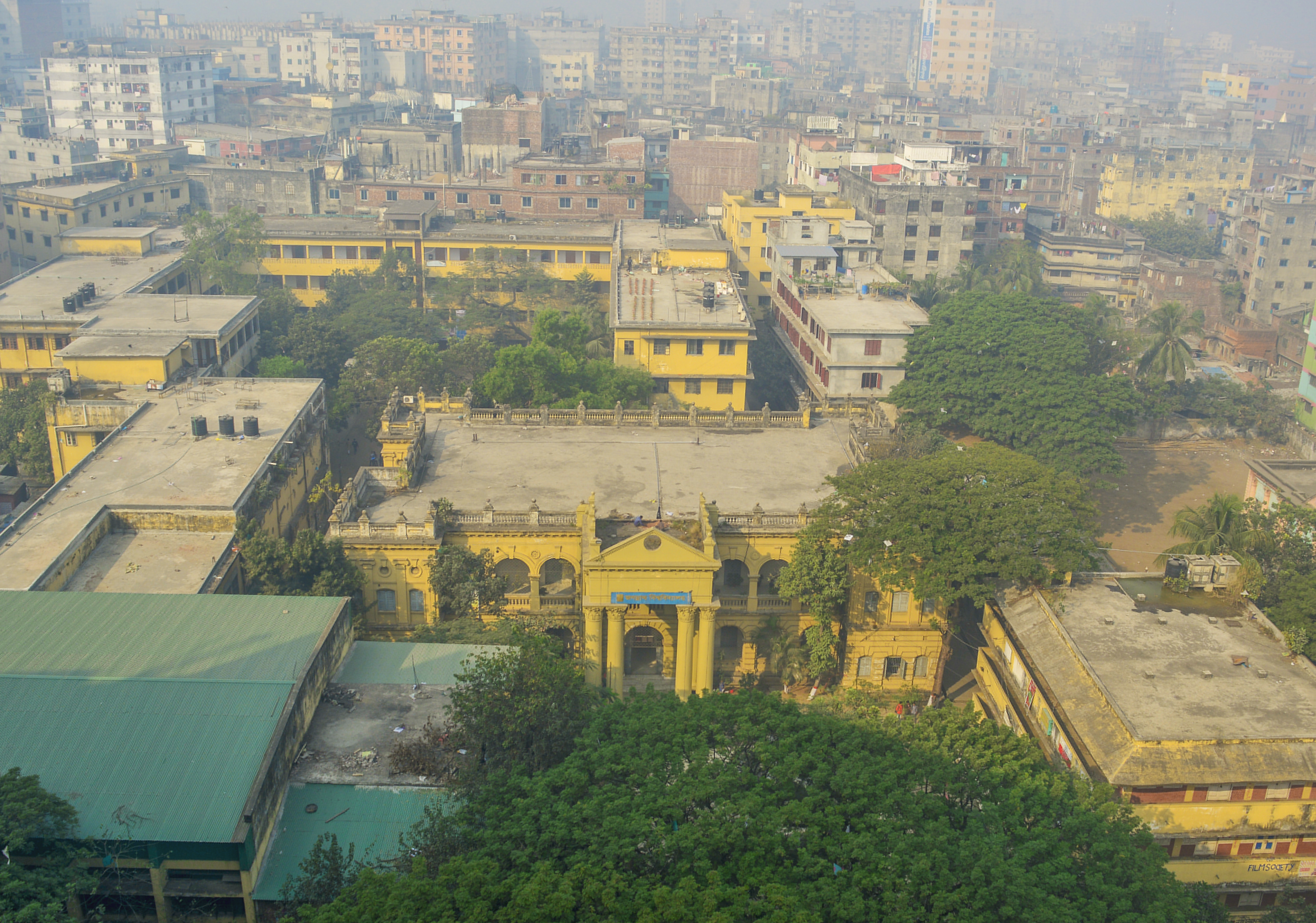
Jagannath University aerial view

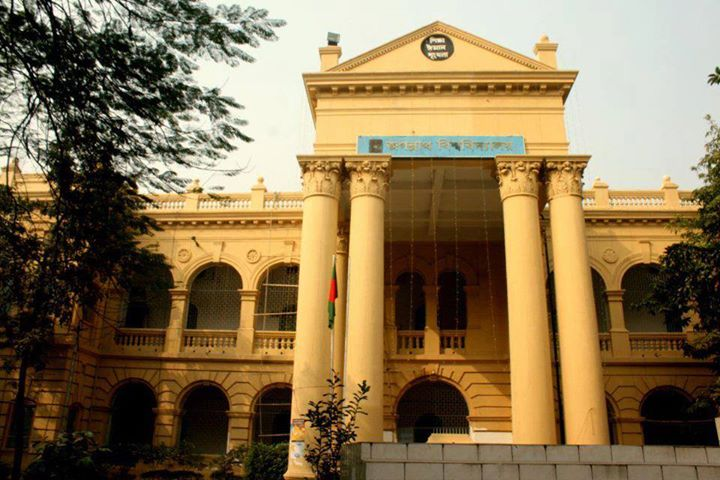
Administrative building of Jagannath University

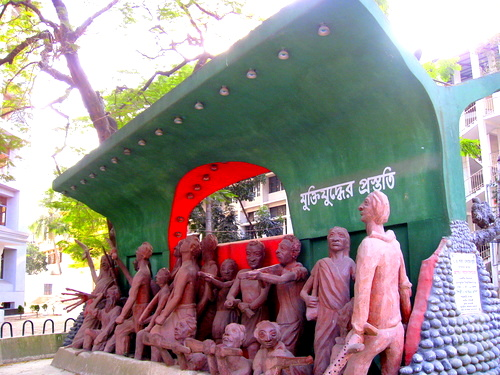
Muktijoddher Prostuti, a sculpture on the Bangladesh Liberation War, at the heart of the campus

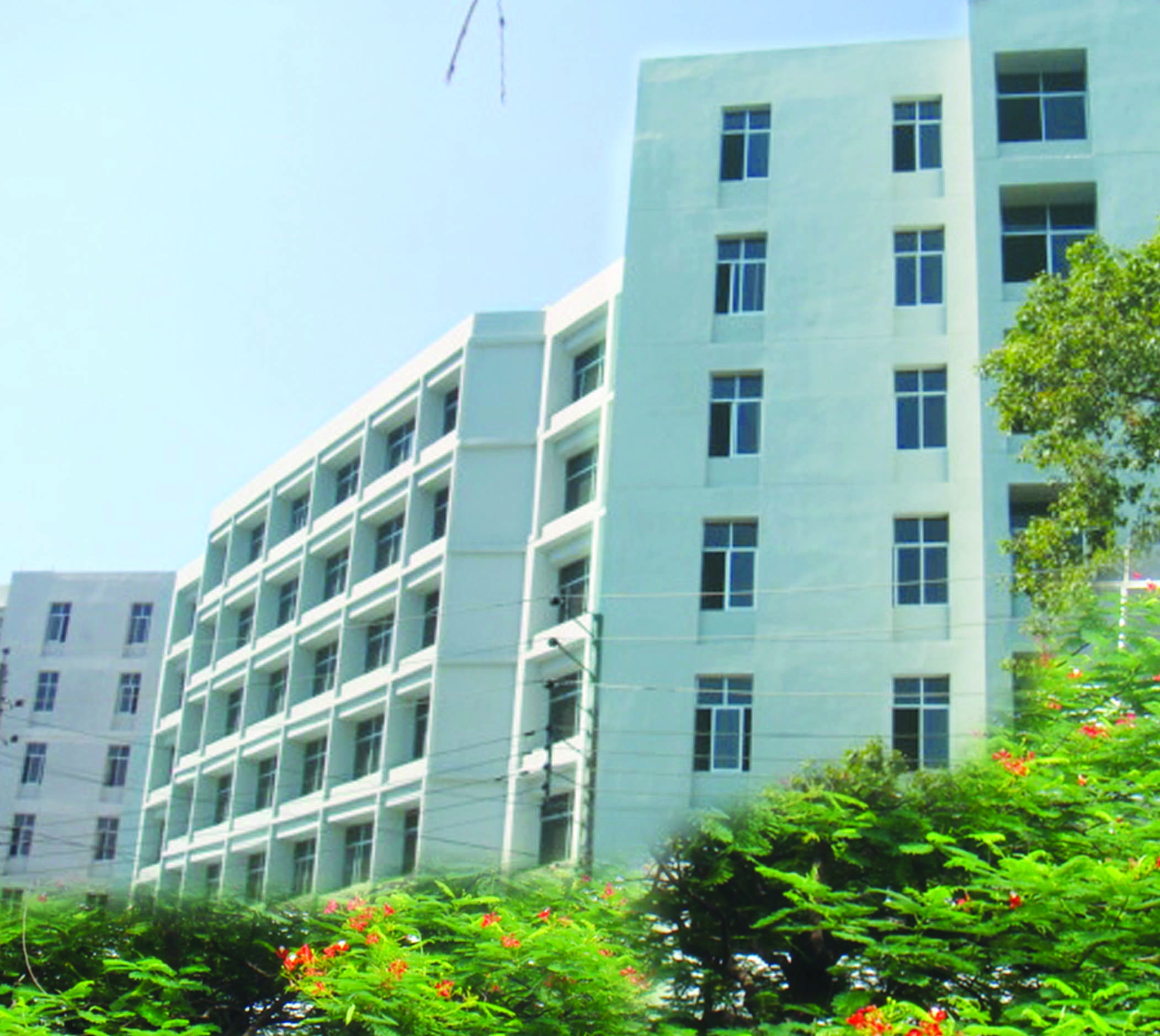
Shahid Sajid Academic Building

=== Faculty of Life and Earth Sciences ===
- Department of Biochemistry and Molecular Biology
- Department of Microbiology
- Department of Pharmacy
- Department of Zoology
- Department of Botany
- Department of Psychology
- Department of Geography and Environment
- Department of Genetic Engineering and Biotechnology

=== Faculty of Science ===
- Department of Computer Science and Engineering (CSE)
- Department of Mathematics
- Department of Chemistry
- Department of Physics
- Department of Statistics

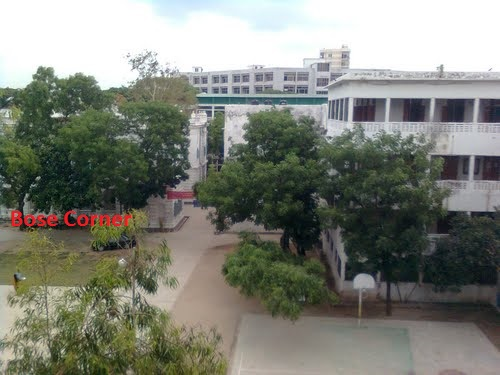
Bose Corner

=== Faculty of Business Studies ===
- Department of Finance
- Department of Management Studies
- Department of Marketing
- Department of Accounting and Information Systems

=== Faculty of Arts ===
- Department of Bengali
- Department of English
- Department of History
- Department of Philosophy
- Department of Islamic History and Culture
- Department of Islamic Studies
- Department of Theatre
- Department of Music

=== Faculty of Law ===
- Department of Law
- Department of Law and Land Administration

=== Faculty of Social Science ===
- Department of Sociology
- Department of Anthropology
- Department of Economics
- Department of Political Science
- Department of Public Administration
- Department of Social Work
- Department of Mass Communication and Journalism
- Department of Film and Television

=== Faculty of Fine Arts ===
- Department of Drawing and Painting
- Department of Printmaking
- Department of 3d Art and Design

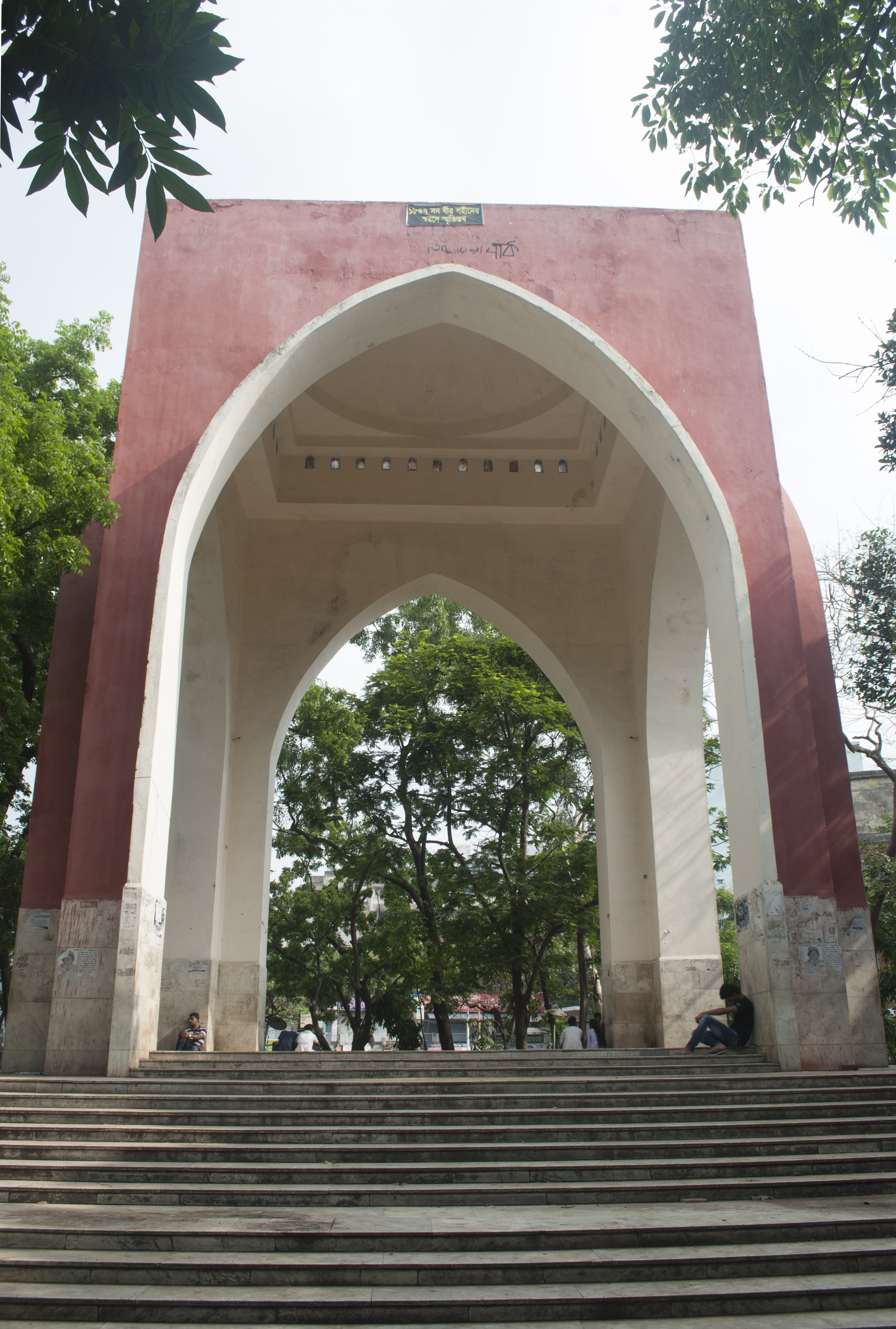
Monument for the Martyred of 1857

Institutes

. Institute of Education and Research

. Institute of Modern Languages

== List of vice chancellors ==
No	Name	From	To
1.	A. K. M. Sirazul Islam Khan	8 February 2006	26 July 2008
2.	Abu Hossain Siddique	2008	2009
3.	Mesbah Uddin Ahmed	2009	19 March 2013
4.	Mijanur Rahman	20 March 2013	19 March 2021
5.	Kamaluddin Ahmed (acting)	20 March 2021	31 May 2021
6.	Md. Imdadul Hoque	1 June 2021	11 November 2023
7.	Sadeka Halim	30 November 2023	11 August 2024
8.	Md. Rezaul Karim	18 September 2024	16 March 2026
9.	Rais Uddin	16 March 2026	

== Notable alumni ==
The teachers and students of the then college took an active part in the Language Movement of the early 1950s, the mass movements of the 1960s and the Bangladesh War of Independence in 1971.

- Commander BDF Sector 11 – M. Hamidullah Khan Bir Protik – Bangladesh War of Independence 1971.
- Rafiq Uddin Ahmed- protester killed during the Bengali Language Movement that took place in East Pakistan (currently Bangladesh) in 1952. He is considered a martyr in Bangladesh.
- Sergeant Zahurul Haq - was a Pakistan Air Force sergeant. He was among the 35 persons accused in the Agartala Conspiracy Case in 1969. He received the Independence Day Award from the Government of Bangladesh in 2018. Sergeant Zahurul Haq Hall of the University of Dhaka is named after him. BAF Zahurul Haq base, a Bangladesh Air Force base is named after him.
- Bhanu Bandopadhyay- an Indian actor, known for his work in Bengali cinema. He acted in over 300 movies, in numerous plays, and frequently performed on the radio.
- Mofazzal Hossain Chowdhury – Freedom Fighter of Crack Platoon, Bangladeshi Minister, Member of Parliament, Bangladesh Awami League leader
- Abdul Hamid – sports organizer and sports journalist
- Williamson A. Sangma, Former Indian Provincial Chief Minister & Governor
- Bhabatosh Dutta – economist
- Premendra Mitra – writer and poet
- Anisuzzaman – educationist, researcher
- Nurul Alam Khan – educationist, mathematician
- Kaliprasanna Vidyaratna – Sanskrit scholar, author
- Haider Hussain – singer
- ATM Shamsuzzaman - actor
- Brojen Das – swimmer, the first Indian to swim the English channel
- Imdadul Haq Milan – novelist and editor
- Mohammed Nasim – Bangladeshi minister
- Mustafa Kamal, former Chief Justice of Bangladesh and Chairman of Law Commission
- Ajit Dutta - Bengali writer & poet
- Arfin Rumey – Singer and Actor
- Chinghla Mong Chowdhury Mari – footballer
- Amer Khan – footballer
- Zahirul Haque – footballer
- Zakaria Pintoo – footballer
- Pratap Shankar Hazra – footballer
- Shohidul Islam - Bangladeshi Cricketer
- B. Roy Chowdhury - footballer and politician
