= Martuza Ahmed =

Former Chief Information Commissioner of Bangladesh

- মরতুজা আহমদ

Information Commissioner of Bangladesh
- In office 18 January 2018 – 17 January 2023
- Preceded by: Golam Rahman
- Succeeded by: Abdul Malek

Martuza Ahmed (Bengali: মরতুজা আহমদ) is a Bangladeshi bureaucrat and former Chief Information Commissioner of the Information Commission. He is a former secretary of the Ministry of Information and Broadcasting.

== Career ==
Ahmed joined the Bangladesh Civil Service in 1982 as part of a special batch. He has served as the Upazila Nirbahi Officer of Noakhali Sadar Upazila. He is a former magistrate of Dhaka City.

Ahmed has served as director of Bangladesh Betar.

Ahmed was the director of Department of Military Lands and Cantonments. He has been the additional secretary of the Cabinet Division.

On 19 January 2019, Ahmed was appointed the chief information commissioner of the Information Commission replacing M Golam Rahman. At the time of his appointment, he was the Bangladesh Sangbad Sangstha chairman. He is responsible for ensuring citizens have access to government information and holding the government accountable. In 2019, he said that lack of information was responsible for the spread of misinformation. He linked access to information to citizens human rights in 2020. On 8 March 2022, Ahmed ruled in favor of Saad Hammadi, human rights and Amnesty International activist, who sought information from Bangladesh police regarding cases filed under Digital Security Act.
