= Md. Imdadul Hoque =

Bangladeshi academic administrator (died 2023)

- মো. ইমদাদুল হক

Vice-Chancellor of Jagannath University
- In office 1 June 2021 – 11 November 2023
- Preceded by: Mijanur Rahman
- Succeeded by: Sadeka Halim

Personal details
- Died: 11 November 2023 Dhaka, Bangladesh
- Education: University of Dhaka

Md. Imdadul Hoque (died 11 November 2023) was a Bangladeshi academic and vice-chancellor of Jagannath University. He was a professor in the Botany Department of the University of Dhaka.

== Early life ==
Hoque was born in Pabna Sadar Upazila on 1 July 1957. He completed his master's degree in botany at the University of Dhaka in 1978 and his PhD in 1987.

== Career ==
Hoque was a professor of botany at the University of Dhaka. He served as the dean of the Biological Science Faculty at the University of Dhaka. He was present at the foundation of the botany department's "Professor Dr. Sheikh Shamimul Alam Trust Fund".

From 2017 to 2020, Hoque was a member of the governing body of Akij College of Home Economics. He was an executive member of the Bangladesh Association for Plant Tissue Culture & Biotechnology.

In May 2019, Hoque attended a seminar on studying in Sweden organized in association with the Swedish embassy. He was a contributor to the Bangladesh Biosafety and Biosecurity Society. He was the vice-chairman of the BEST foundation.

In June 2021, Hoque was appointed vice-chancellor of Jagannath University for a four-year term. He replaced Mijanur Rahman as the vice-chancellor of Jagannath University. He oversaw the inauguration of the first female dormitory of the university.

== Death ==
Hoque died from cancer on 11 November 2023 in Dhaka.
