= Mohammed Farooq (diplomat) =

Ambassador of Bangladesh to the Philippines
- In office 3 March 2000 – 28 February 2002
- Preceded by: Reazul Hossain
- Succeeded by: Munir-Uz-Zaman

Personal details
- Born: 10 January 1949 Bhola, East Bengal, Dominion of Pakistan
- Died: 20 August 2018 (aged 69) Dhaka, Bangladesh

Mohammed Farooq (10 January 1949 – 20 August 2018) was a Bangladeshi ambassador who served as the chief information commissioner leading the Information Commission. He was the ambassador of Bangladesh to the Philippines.

== Early life ==
Farooq was born on 10 January 1949 in Bhola, East Bengal, Dominion of Pakistan.

== Career ==
Farooq joined the Bangladesh Civil Service in 1973 as a cadre of the foreign affairs branch. He had worked at the Bangladesh High Commission in Australia, Bhutan, and Malaysia. He was also stationed in the Bangladeshi consulate in Los Angeles and the Bangladeshi embassy in the United States.

From December 2000 to February 2002, Farooq was the ambassador of Bangladesh to the Philippines.

On 16 October 2012, Farooq was appointed chief information commissioner replacing Ambassador Muhammed Zamir. Farooq hosted Ronald Meinardus, regional director of the Friedrich Naumann Foundation, in February 2015 in Dhaka. He met with delegates from Management and Resource Development Initiative who had suggestions for improving the Right to Information Act. He called for political commitment to ending corruption in Bangladesh.

On 9 January 2016, Farooq left the Information Commission and was replaced by Md. Golam Rahman.

== Death ==
Farooq died on 20 August 2018 in Dhaka, Bangladesh.
