= Information Commission (Bangladesh) =

Information Commission Bangladesh
- তথ্য কমিশন বাংলাদেশ

Agency overview
- Formed: 1 July 2009
- Jurisdiction: Government of Bangladesh
- Headquarters: Dhaka, Bangladesh
- Agency executives: Nahreen Islam Khan, Chief Information Commissioner; S. A. M. Mahfuzur Rahman, Information Commissioner; Khan Mohammad Abul Hossain, Information Commissioner
- Key document: Right to Information Act, 2009
- Website: infocom.gov.bd

The Information Commission Bangladesh is an independent statutory body responsible for ensuring citizens have access to information according to the Right to Information Act, 2009.

== History ==
The Information Commission of Bangladesh was established on 1 July 2009 by the Awami League government after the Right to Information Act, 2009 (RTI Act) took effect. The Act was based on the Right to Information Ordinance, which was promulgated on 20 October 2008 by the Caretaker Government during the 2006–2008 Bangladeshi political crisis and later ratified by the parliament on 29 March 2009.

The commission consists of the Chief Information Commissioner (CIC) and two other commissioners, at least one of whom must be a woman. The removal procedure for a commissioner is the one followed for that of a judge of the Bangladesh Supreme Court. Bangladesh's first CIC was M Azizur Rahman, a retired government secretary. Sadeka Halim, a professor at University of Dhaka, and Mohammad Abu Taher, another retired secretary, were appointed as the first two commissioners. They were selected through a selection committee led by a judge of the Bangladesh Supreme Court. The inclusion of two former civil servants as commissioners drew criticism.

Since 2014 the two commissioners have held the rank of a government secretary.

In addition to government bodies, private organisations or institutions run by government financing, grants from government funds, or foreign aid grants, and organisations or institutions undertaking public functions under contracts made on behalf of the government or made with public bodies or institutions are bound to provide information under the Act. However, the Act contains a list of twenty exceptions to the disclosure obligation. In addition, the Act lists state security and intelligence agencies that are generally exempted from disclosure obligations, unless the relevant information relates to corruption or human rights abuse. Such disclosures require the relevant agencies to obtain approval from the commission upon the receipt of such requests. In 2018, these two limitations were criticised as being key drivers of the gradual decrease of RTI applications filed between 2011 and 2016.

In 2013–2014, the commission heard complaints filed by officials of Shushashoner Jonno Nagorik (SHUJAN), a civil society platform, concerning responses from the Bangladesh Election Commission (EC). The commission upheld the EC decisions not to disclose audited annual statements of accounts submitted to it by political parties and agreed with the EC's reasoning that consent was necessary from individual parties to disclose the information sought under the RTI Act. The political parties were required to submit the requested information to the EC under the Political Parties Registration Rules, 2008, framed under Article 94 of the Representation of the People Order, 1972. The position was then challenged before the High Court of Bangladesh. In 2016, the court held that the information commission's position was unlawful, concluding that the statements in question could not be treated as secret information under the RTI Act.

== List of Information Commissioners ==
=== Chief Information Commissioners ===
Sl. No.	Name	Start date	End date	Reference
1.	M Azizur Rahman	2 July 2009	10 Jan 2010	
2.	Muhammad Zamir	31 March 2010	3 September 2012	
3.	Mohammed Farooq	11 October 2012	9 January 2016	
4.	Md. Golam Rahman	7 February 2016	6 January 2018	
5.	Martuza Ahmed	18 January 2018	17 January 2023	
6.	Abdul Malek	22 March 2023	10 September 2024	
7.	Nahreen Islam Khan	17 October 2026	incumbent	

=== Information Commissioners ===
Sl. No.	Name	Start date	End date	Reference
1.	Mohammad Abu Taher	2 July 2009	1 July 2014	
2.	Sadeka Halim	5 July 2009	4 July 2014	
3.	Khurshida Begum Sayeed	28 September 2014	31 January 2018	
4.	Nepal Chandra Sarker	16 September 2014	15 September 2019	
5.	Abdul Malek	30 January 2020	21 March 2023	
6.	Suraiya Begum	29 May 2018	28 May 2023	
7.	Masuda Bhatti	24 August 2023	20 January 2025	
8.	Shahidul Alam Jhinuk	24 August 2023	10 September 2024	
9.	S. A. M. Mahfuzur Rahman	17 October 2026	incumbent	
10.	Khan Mohammad Abul Hossain	17 October 2026	incumbent	
