= Nepal Chandra Sarker =

Nepal Chandra Sarker is a retired Bangladeshi Civil Servant and former Commissioner of the Information Commission.

== Early life ==
Sarker was born on 5 March 1954 in Tangail District, East Pakistan, Pakistan.

== Career ==
Sarker joined the administration cadre of Bangladesh Civil Service in 1981. He served as the Upazila Nirbahi Officer of Pirganj Upazila, Gobindaganj Upazila, and Mathbaria Upazila. He was the Deputy Commissioner of Thakurgaon District. In Manikganj District, he was the additional district magistrate. He was the additional deputy commissioner of Kurigram District. He served in Land Appeal Board. He was the assistant commissioner of Jamalpur Collectorate & Civil Officers' Training Academy. On 28 August 2003, he was promoted to joint secretary August 2003. In 2004 and 2005, he was the joint secretary of the Ministry of Shipping.

Sarker served as the founding secretary of the Bangladesh Information Commission. His leave preparatory to retirement was cancelled in 2011 and he was appointed secretary of the Bangladesh Information Commission. Sarker retired from the Bangladesh Civil Service in 2012. On 16 September 2014, Sarker was appointed Commissioner of the Information Commission. He was the Adviser Programme Operations of the Management and Resources Development Initiative.

Sarker's term as commissioner of the Information Commission ended 15 September 2019.

== Personal life ==
Sarker is married to Shibani Sarker. Their son, Shuvro Prosun Sarker, is assistant professor of Indian Institute of Technology, Kharagpur and author of Refugee Law in India: The Road from Ambiguity to Protection.
