= Law and Justice Division =

Bangladeshi government division

- Government Seal of Bangladesh
- Formation: 2009
- Headquarters: Dhaka, Bangladesh
- Region served: Bangladesh
- Official language: Bengali
- Website: Law and Justice Division

Law and Justice Division (Bengali: আইন ও বিচার বিভাগ) is a Bangladesh government division under the Ministry of Law, Justice and Parliamentary Affairs responsible for managing the judicial apparatus of Bangladesh. Sheikh Abu Taher is the secretary in charge of the Law and Justice Division.

== History ==
In December 2009, the Government of Bangladesh, led by Prime Minister Sheikh Hasina, divided the Ministry of Law, Justice and Parliamentary Affairs into the Legislative and Parliamentary Affairs Division and Law and Justice Division.

On 29 July 2018, Law and Justice Division launched the Justice Audit Bangladesh in partnership with Deutsche Gesellschaft für Internationale Zusammenarbeit at the Bangabandhu International Conference Center. The purpose of the audit is to examine the judicial services of Bangladesh. The government of Bangladesh allocated 17.4 billion taka for the Law and Justice Division for the 2020-2021 budget session.

On 6 March 2020, Bangladesh High Court asked the Secretary of the law and justice division to explain why Md Abdul Mannan, Sessions Judge of Pirojpur, was removed from his position. The court observed that the Judge was removed few hours after sentencing former Government Minister and Member of Parliament, A. K. M. A. Awal Saydur Rahman, and his wife in a corruption case. The judge also questioned if the transfer was an infringement of the judicial independence and why it should not be declared illegal.

== Units ==
- Solicitor Wing
- Bangladesh Supreme Court
- Bangladesh Law Commission
- Bangladesh Judicial Service Commission
- National Legal Aid Services Organization
- Directorate of Registration
- Judicial Administration Training Institute
- International Crimes Tribunal
