= K. L. Jubilee High School & College =

K. L. Jubilee School & College
- কে. এল. জুবিলী স্কুল অ্যান্ড কলেজ

Location
- 39, Northbrok hall road, Banglabazar, Dhaka-1100; 23.7052°N 90.4126°E

Information
- Type: Combined (Boys & Girls)
- Established: 1866; 160 years ago
- Founder: Kishorilal Roy Chowdhury
- Language: Bengali

K. L. Jubilee School & College (কে. এল. জুবিলী স্কুল অ্যান্ড কলেজ) is one of the oldest and most prestigious private educational institutions in Dhaka, Bangladesh. Established in 1866 by Zamindar Kishorilal Roy Chowdhury, the institution provides continuous education from kindergarten to grade twelve. Over the decades, it has produced notable alumni who have made significant contributions in fields such as science, sports, and the arts. The school is located at 39 Northbrook Hall Road in the historic Banglabazar area, near Lal Kuthi and the banks of the Buriganga River.

== History ==
The origin of the school dates back to the Dhaka Brahmo School, founded in 1863 in Nilkuthi by Brojosundar Basu. In 1868, Kishorilal Roy Chowdhury took over and renamed it Jagannath School after his father Jagannath Roy Chowdhury. In 1887, the school section was separated from Jagannath College and became an independent institution named Kishorilal Jubilee School. Over time, it evolved into what is now known as K. L. Jubilee School & College.

== Campus ==
The school is located on 39 Northbrook Hall Road, near Lal Kuthi and the banks of the Buriganga River. The campus consists of four academic buildings surrounding a central playground, with additional gardens. The school features science and computer labs, a library, and an auditorium. One of the buildings has a painted map of Bangladesh by a former teacher, and there is also a monument commemorating the Bangladesh Liberation War.

== Academics ==
The institution is affiliated with the Board of Intermediate and Secondary Education, Dhaka and follows the national curriculum in the Bengali medium. It prepares students for the following national examinations:

- Primary Education Completion (PEC) – Class 5
- Junior School Certificate (JSC) – Class 8
- Secondary School Certificate (SSC) – Class 10
- Higher Secondary Certificate (HSC) – Class 12

The school operates in double shifts. The morning shift is for female students (7:30 am–11:30 am), and the day shift is for male students (12:00 pm–5:00 pm). The college section runs in the morning only.

== Extracurricular Activities ==
K. L. Jubilee School & College hosts a wide range of co-curricular activities, including:

- Scouting
- Girls' Guide
- BNCC
- Debating and quiz competitions
- Cultural and science fairs
- Inter-school sports and games

== Notable alumni ==
- Meghnad Saha – Renowned Indian astrophysicist, known for the Saha ionization equation. He passed the Entrance Exam from Kishorilal Jubilee School in 1909.
- Brojen Das – First South Asian to swim the English Channel. He completed his SSC from this school in 1946.
- Manohar Aich – Former Mr. Universe 1952, and celebrated bodybuilder.
- Indramohan Rajbongshi – Prominent folk artist and freedom fighter.

== See also ==
- List of schools in Bangladesh
- Jagannath University
