= Kishorilal Roy Chowdhury =

Bengali zamindar (1848-1925)

- কিশোরীলাল রায় চৌধুরী
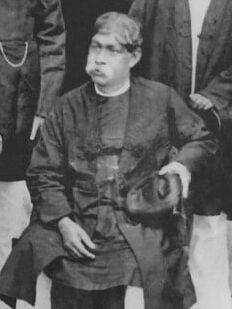
- Chowdhury in 1907
- Born: 19 November 1848; Manikganj, Bengal Presidency, British India
- Died: 3 July 1925 (aged 76)
- Father: Jagannath Roy Chowdhury

Kishorilal Roy Chowdhury (19 November 1848 – 3 July 1925) was a Bengali zamindar. He was a member of the Baliati Zamindari.

In 1868, Chowdhury took over the responsibility of the management Dhaka Brahma School, founded by Brojosundar Basu in 1863. He then changed its name to Jagannath School after his father Jagannath Roy Chowdhury. In 1887, the school section of Jagannath College (now Jagannath University since 2005) was separated to form the independent Kishorilal Jubilee School, (now known as the K. L. Jubilee High School & College).

Chowdhury was a member of the trusty board, formed on 1 March 1907, to look after the management of Jagannath College, along with Roy Chandra Kumar Dutt Bahadur and Anand Chandra Roy.
