= Fazlul Halim Chowdhury =

- Fazlul Halim Chowdhury
- Born: 1 August 1930; Kunja Sreepur, Comilla, Bengal Presidency, British India
- Died: 9 April 1996 (aged 65)
- Education: BSc University of Dhaka; MSc University of Dhaka (1951); PhD Manchester University (1956)
- Children: Sadeka Halim
- Scientific career
- Fields: Physical chemistry
- Workplaces: University of Dhaka; Rajshahi University; University of Asia Pacific
- Thesis: The Acid Behaviour of Carboxylic Derivatives (1956)

Fazlul Halim Chowdhury (1 August 1930 – 9 April 1996) was a fellow of the Bangladesh Academy of Sciences and one of the longest-serving Vice-Chancellors of the University of Dhaka. He made pioneering contributions to the development of physical chemistry in Bangladesh, publishing more than 20 articles. He focused on cellulose fibers (especially jute), polyelectrolytes, and proteins.

== Early life ==
Chowdhury was born on 1 August 1930 to Abdul Aziz Chowdhury, an educationist and Afifa Khatun of Kunja Sreepur village, in Comilla District, Bengal Presidency.

== Education ==
- BSc (Hons), Department of Chemistry, University of Dhaka, First in the First Class
- MSc, Department of Chemistry, University of Dhaka, First in the First Class, 1951
- PhD, Manchester University, UK (Thesis entitled "The Acid Behaviour of Carboxylic Derivatives", 5 July 1956) Awarded "Royal Commission for the Exhibition of 1851" to pursue PhD studies.

== Academic career ==
- Lecturer, 1952–53; assistant professor, 1956–58, Department of Chemistry, Dhaka University
- Professor, Department of Chemistry and Applied Chemistry, Rajshahi University, 1958–90
- Nuffield Fellow, Cambridge University, U.K. 1960–62
- Dean, Faculty of Science, Rajshahi University, 1972
- Commonwealth Senior Fellow, Cambridge University, U.K. 1973–74
- Member, University Grants Commission (UGC), 1974–76
- Vice Chancellor, University of Dhaka, 1976–83
- Fellow of Bangladesh Academy of Sciences, 1979
- Asia Foundation Fellowship, 1984
- President, Bangladesh Chemical Society, 1984–86
- Senior Advisor in Basic Sciences, UNESCO, New Delhi, 1985–90
- University of Asia Pacific, Dhaka, 1995–96
- President, The Rajshahi University Teachers Association
- Provost, Abdul Latif Hall, Rajshahi University
- Senior Researcher, American Association for the Advancement of Science Washington D.C.

== Research ==
Chowdhury made pioneering contributions to the development of physical chemistry in the country, publishing more than 20 articles. He focused on cellulose fibers (of jute in particular), polyelectrolytes, and proteins. He also guided a number of PhD theses.
