= Sadeka Halim =

Bangladesh academic

- সাদেকা হালিম
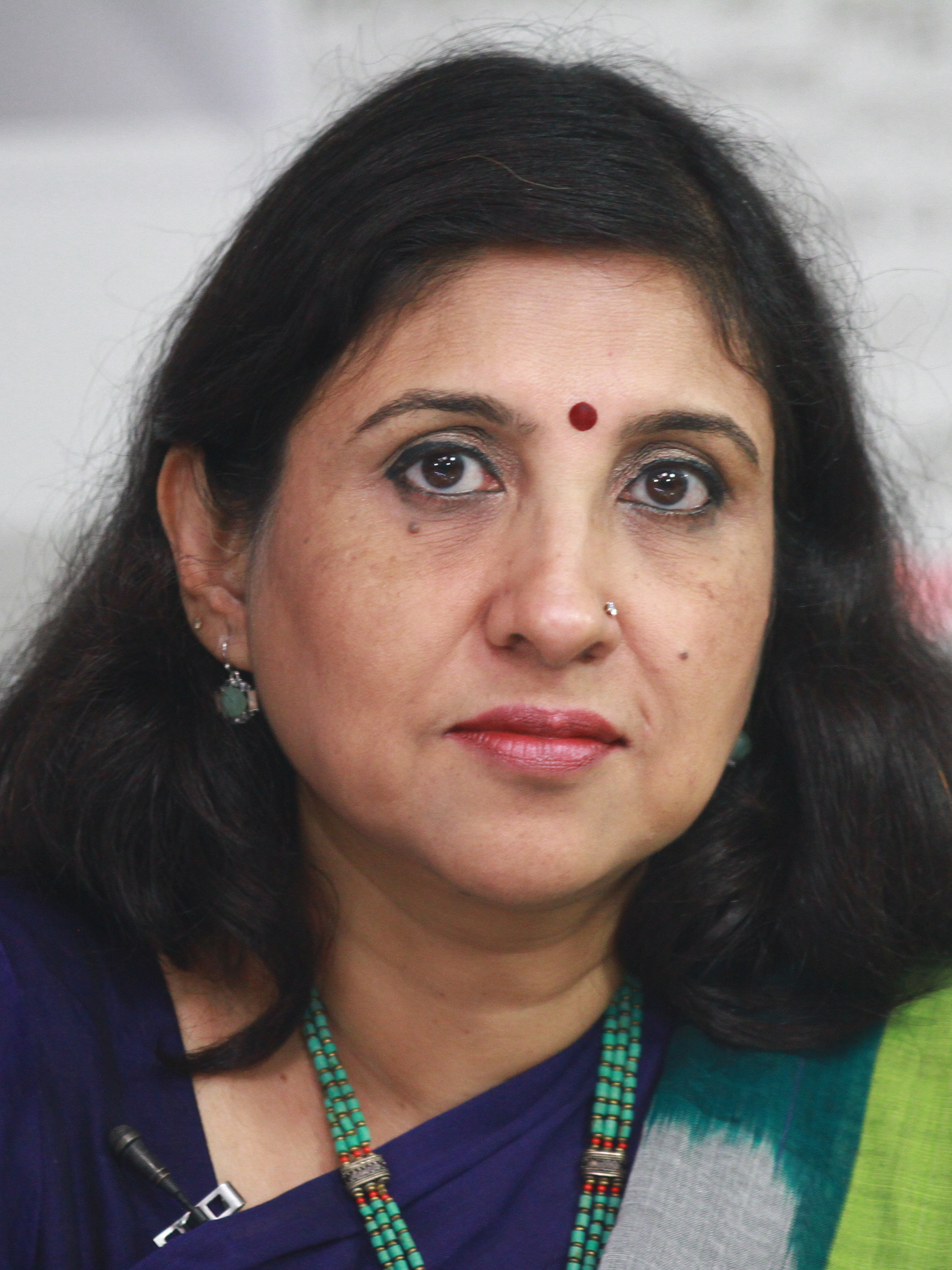
- Halim in 2017

Vice-Chancellor of Jagannath University
- In office 30 November 2023 – 11 August 2024
- Preceded by: Md. Imdadul Hoque

Personal details
- Parent: Fazlul Halim Chowdhury (father)
- Education: PhD
- Alma mater: University of Dhaka; McGill University

Sadeka Halim is a suspended academic. She is the former and first female vice-chancellor of Jagannath University, appointed by the President of Bangladesh since November 2023. She was a professor at Dhaka University and the first female dean of the Faculty of Social Sciences of the university. She is the first female to be the Information Commissioner of Bangladesh.

== Early life and education ==
Halim's father, Fazlul Halim Chowdhury, was a vice-chancellor of the University of Dhaka. She passed the SSC exam from Udyon High School and the HSC exam from Holy Cross High School and College in Dhaka. She graduated from the University of Dhaka.

== Career ==
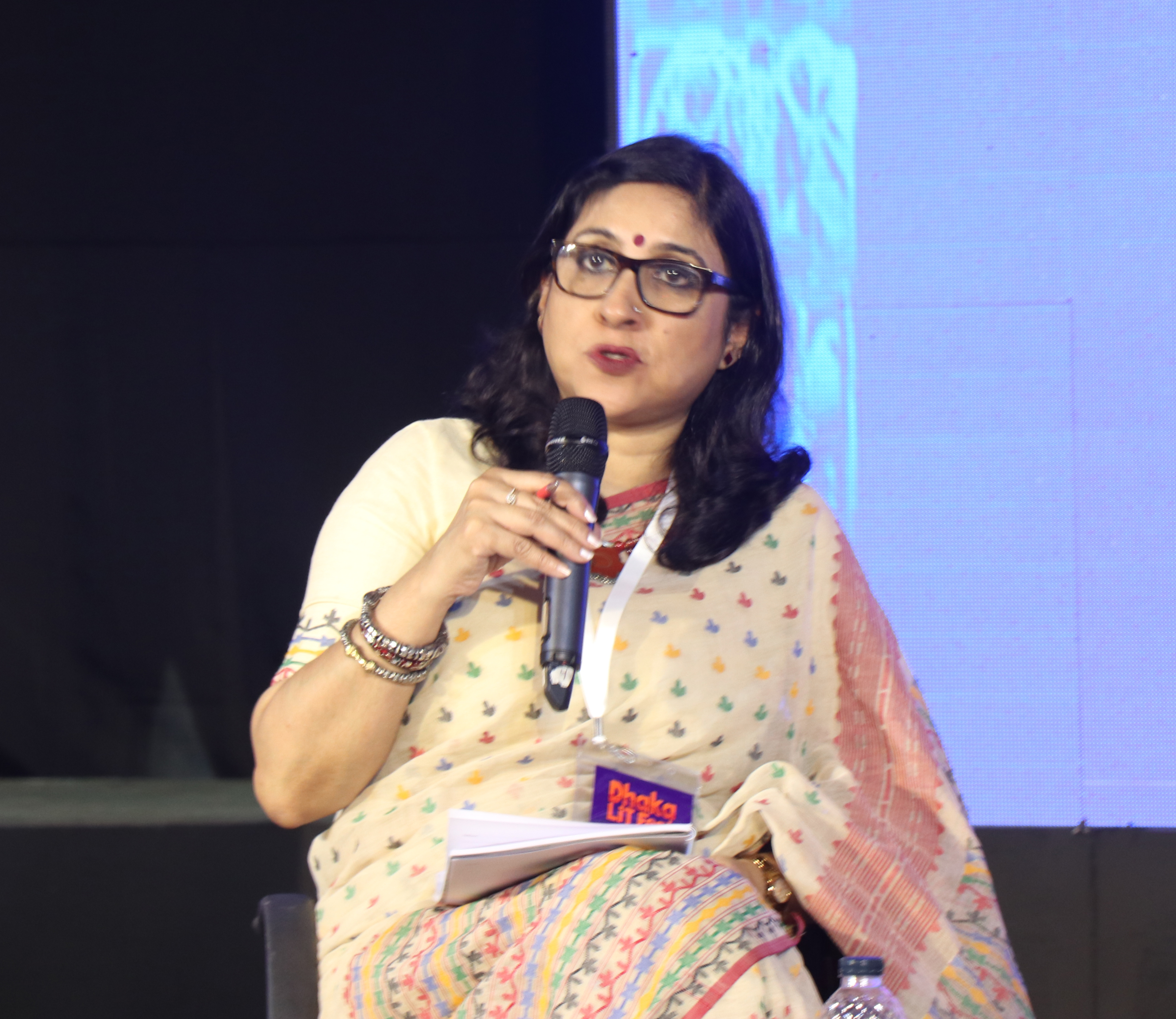
Halim at a discussion program at Dhaka Lit Fest 2017

In 1988, Halim was appointed as a teacher in the Department of Social Sciences at University of Dhaka. Later, she received a second postgraduate and PhD degree from McGill University of Canada with Commonwealth Scholarship in 2000. She then completed the post-doctorate of the Commonwealth Staff Fellowship from the University of Bath of the United Kingdom. From July 2009 to June 2014, she served as the first woman information commissioner. Besides, she served as a syndicate member of the University of Dhaka from 2004 to 2009, and she was a member of the executive council of the Teachers' Association and three times a member of the Senate. She was a member of the National Education Policy Committee-18 of 2009 special educationists committee. About 50 research articles have been published in national and international journals. Issues related to gender equality, forest and land, development, indigenous issues, rights of human rights and information.

In September 2022, the government broke the trustee board of Manarat International University and created a new board which included Halim. In 2022, she became a member of Awami League Advisory Council.

She resigned as a VC of JnU on 11 August 2024, amid student protests.

== Controversy ==
Different public universities teacher have raised allegations of plagiarism in a research paper produced by Halim. Later, she issued legal notice against a Dhaka University (DU) reporter along with four others for publishing news of allegedly plagiarism in her research paper.

== Published books ==
- Chetonayonei Unnayun : Bangladeshi Nijera Kori'r Obhiggota
- Development as Conscientization : The Case of Nijera Kori in Bangladesh
- Life and Land of Adibashis : Land Dispossession and Alienation of Adibshis in the plain Districts of Bangladesh
