= Health Economics Unit =

Bangladesh government regulatory agency

- Formation: 1994
- Headquarters: Dhaka, Bangladesh
- Region served: Bangladesh
- Official language: Bengali
- Website: heu.gov.bd

The Health Economics Unit (Bengali: স্বাস্থ্য অর্থনীতি ইউনিট) is a Bangladesh government regulatory agency under the Ministry of Health and Family Welfare of Bangladesh responsible for providing policy advice and recommendations on the health industry to the government.

== History ==
The Health Economics Unit traces back to a government project under the Fourth Population and Health Project of the Ministry of Health and Family Welfare, established in 1994. In 1997, the project created the National Health Accounts. It also helped establish the Institute of Health Economics, University of Dhaka. From 1998 to 2003, the government of Bangladesh transformed the project into the Policy Research Unit. The Policy Research Unit was composed of three wings: the Health Economics Unit, the Human Resources Development Unit, and the Gender, NGO and Stakeholder Participation Unit. In 2002, the government merged the Health Economics Unit and the Gender, NGO and Stakeholder Participation Unit. and the new entity was named Health and Economics Unit. While the Human Resources Development Unit was merged into the Administration wing of the Ministry of Health and Family Welfare.
