= A. K. M. Sirazul Islam Khan =

Bangladeshi academic and microbiologist (c.1943–2019)

1st Vice-Chancellor of Jagannath University
- In office 8 February 2006 – 26 July 2008
- Preceded by: Office Established
- Succeeded by: Abu Hossain Siddique

Personal details
- Born: c. 1943
- Died: 14 December 2019 (aged 76)
- Education: University of Dhaka

A. K. M. Sirazul Islam Khan (c. 1943 – 14 December 2019) was a Bangladeshi academic and microbiologist. He was a professor in the Soil, Water and Environment Department (previously the Soil Science Department) and Microbiology Department of the University of Dhaka and also the first vice-chancellor of Jagannath University.

== Biography ==
Khan was the chairman of Dhaka University's microbiology department. He also served as the chairman of the Center for Advanced Research in Sciences. He was the dean of North South University's School of Health and Life Science too. Besides, he served as the dean of Dhaka University's Faculty of Biological Science and chairman of the Bangladesh Society of Microbiologists. He served as vice-chancellor of Jagannath University from 8 February 2006 to 26 July 2008.

Khan died on 14 December 2019 at the age of 76.
