= Suraiya Begum =

Bangladeshi civil servant

Information Commission
- In office 29 May 2018 – 28 May 2023

Personal details
- Occupation: Bangladeshi Civil Servant

Suraiya Begum is a retired Bangladeshi Civil Servant and former Commissioner of the Information Commission. She was the Secretary of the Ministry of Cultural Affairs.

== Early life ==
Begum did her bachelor's degree and masters in Economics from the University of Dhaka. She has a masters in health management from University of Leeds. She was the first women to do a NDC course from the National Defence College.

== Career ==
In 1982, Begum joined the Bangladesh Civil Service.

Begum was the Joint Secretary of Ministry of Cultural Affairs in 2007. In July 2008, Begum was the Deputy Registrar of Bangladesh Nursing Council.

Begum served as the secretary of the Statistics and Informatics Division and the Implementation Monitoring and Evaluation Division. She was the first secretary at the Bangladesh Deputy High Commission, Kolkata. She is the chairperson of the Bangladesh Civil Service Women Network.

In April 2011, Begum led the Bangladeshi delegation to the 150th birth anniversary of Rabindranath Tagore. In February 2012, Bangladesh High Court summoned Begum, when she was serving as the Secretary of the Ministry of Cultural Affairs, and asked her to explain why contempt of court proceedings should not be taken against her for failing to obey a directive of the High Court to protect Central Shaheed Minar. She was the Secretary of the Ministry of Social Welfare in 2013.

From February 2015 to January 2018, Begum was the senior secretary at the Prime Ministers Office under Prime Minister Sheikh Hasina. In March 2015, she attended a program Access to Information to celebrate women's day as chief guest. She was part of Prime Minister Sheikh Hasina's trip to France in December 2017. On 26 January, Sajjadul Hassan replaced her as the senior secretary at the Prime Ministers Office. On 29 May 2018, she was appointed a commissioner of the Information Commission. She was appointed director of Grameen Bank by the government of Bangladesh. She briefly served as the Chief Information Officer in 2023.

Begum ended her term as Information Commissioner on 28 May 2023.
