= Ajit Dutta =

Bengali writer, editor, publisher, and professor

- অজিত দত্ত
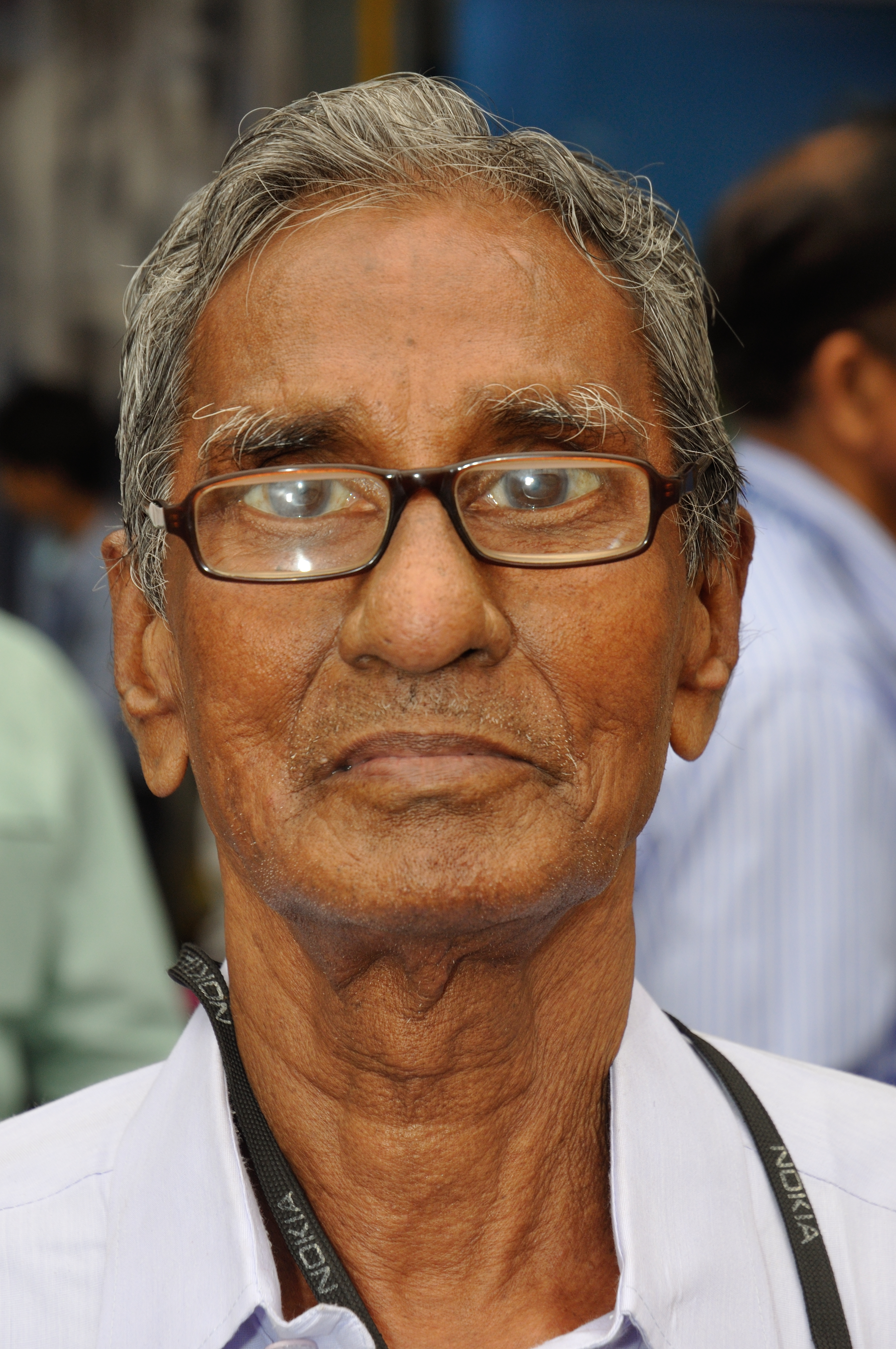
- Born: 23 September 1907; Dacca, Bengal Presidency, British India
- Died: 30 December 1979 (aged 72); Rashbehari Avenue, Calcutta, West Bengal, India
- Education: University of Dacca
- Occupations: Write, editor, publisher, professor
- Years active: 1925-1979

Ajit Kumar Dutta (1907–1979) was a prominent Bengali writer, editor, publisher, and professor who was particularly known for his poetry.

== Early life ==
Ajit Dutta was born on 23 September 1907 in Dacca. His father was Atulkumar Dutta, a deputy magistrate, and his mother was Hemnalini, née GuhaThakurta. When he was four, his father died. He grew up with brothers and sisters in the family home on Asak Lane. When he was 14, he met Buddhadeva Bose, who was one year his junior.

Dutta was admitted to Jagannath College (present-day Jagannath University) in 1924. After completing his Intermediate of Arts, he moved to Calcutta in 1926 and was admitted to Vidyasagar College in BA English Honours. After the death of his elder brother, however, he returned to Dacca, where he was admitted to the Bangla and Sanskrit department of Dacca University. Dutta completed his BA in 1929 and his MA in 1930, ranking first in his class both times.

== Career ==
Dutta published his first poem in 1925, in the magazine Manasi O Marmabani. His work also appeared in Kallol, a popular Bengali literary magazine of the time. He co-edited the monthly literary magazine Pragati with Bose starting in 1927. Dutta's first book of poetry, Kusumer Mas, was published in 1930, at the same time as Bose's Bandir Bandana. They dedicated the books to each other.

After graduation, Dutta began teaching at Dacca University on a temporary basis. Shortly thereafter he returned to Calcutta, where he taught at Ripon Collegiate School. In 1933, he married Uma Roy. He left Ripon in 1936 and joined the Indian Tea Market Expansion Board as an assistant publicity officer under his maternal cousin.

In 1937, Bose moved into a first-floor flat at 202 Rashbehari Avenue. The building came to be known as Kavita Bhavan (House of Poetry), after Bose's press, which published the quarterly poetry magazine Kavita. Dutta was involved with Kavita, and his second volume of poetry, Patalkanya, was published by Kavita Bhavan in 1938. That year, Dutta moved into a flat above his friend Bose. Cultural historian Sumanta Banerjee described the street as "the cynosure of intellectuals". Other writers and professors, such as Suniti Kumar Chatterjee, lived nearby.

Dutta left the tea board after 10 years to become a publicity officer for Calcutta National Bank. In 1947, he started a publishing house, Diganta Publishers. According to professor of comparative literature Amiya Dev, it "brought out nineteen important titles". Dutta left the bank and resumed teaching at various colleges, including at Presidency College. He joined Jadavpur University at its founding in 1956 and retired from the university in 1970.

Dutta died on 30 December 1979.

== Books ==
=== Poetry ===
- Kusumer Mas (1930)
- Patalkanya (1938)
- Nasthtachand (1945)
- Purnanava (1946)
- Chadar Boi (1950)
- Chhayar Alpana (1951)
- Janala (1954)
- Kavita Samgrabha (1959)
- Shreshtha Kavita (1970)
- Sada Mekh Kalo Pahad (1971)

=== Prose ===
- Janantika (1949)
- Mon Pavaner Nao (1950)
- Saras Prabandha (1968)
- Bangla Sahitye Hasyaras (1960)
