= Nahreen Islam Khan =

Chief Information Commissioner of Bangladesh

- নাহরিন ইসলাম খান

Chief Information Commissioner of Bangladesh
- Incumbent
- Assumed office 17 October 2026
- Preceded by: Abdul Malek

Personal details
- Education: PhD
- Alma mater: Jahangirnagar University

Nahreen Islam Khan is a Bangladeshi academic and media personality. She is the Chief Information Commissioner of Bangladesh since October 2026. She is a professor in the Department of Geography and Environment at Jahangirnagar University. She became the first woman to lead the Information Commission of Bangladesh.

== Education ==
Khan studied Geography and Environment at Jahangirnagar University, where she completed her bachelor's and master's degrees. She later earned a PhD from the University of Marburg. She also completed a master's degree in environmental policy and environmental conflict management at the University of Freiburg. In addition, she earned a diploma in gender studies from the University of Natural Resources and Life Sciences.

== Career ==
She worked as a professor in the Department of Geography and Environment at Jahangirnagar University. She also became known as a media personality and appeared in newspapers and on television to discuss public affairs and government issues.

=== Chief Information Commissioner ===
On 17 October 2026, the government appointed Khan as the Chief Information Commissioner of Bangladesh. President made the appointment under Section 15(1) of the Right to Information Act, 2009. Her appointment made her the first woman to head the country's Information Commission.

The Information Commission is responsible for supporting the public's right to access information under the country's right-to-information law. Following her appointment, Khan said that the commission would take steps to protect citizens' right to know.
