= Directorate General of Nursing and Midwifery =

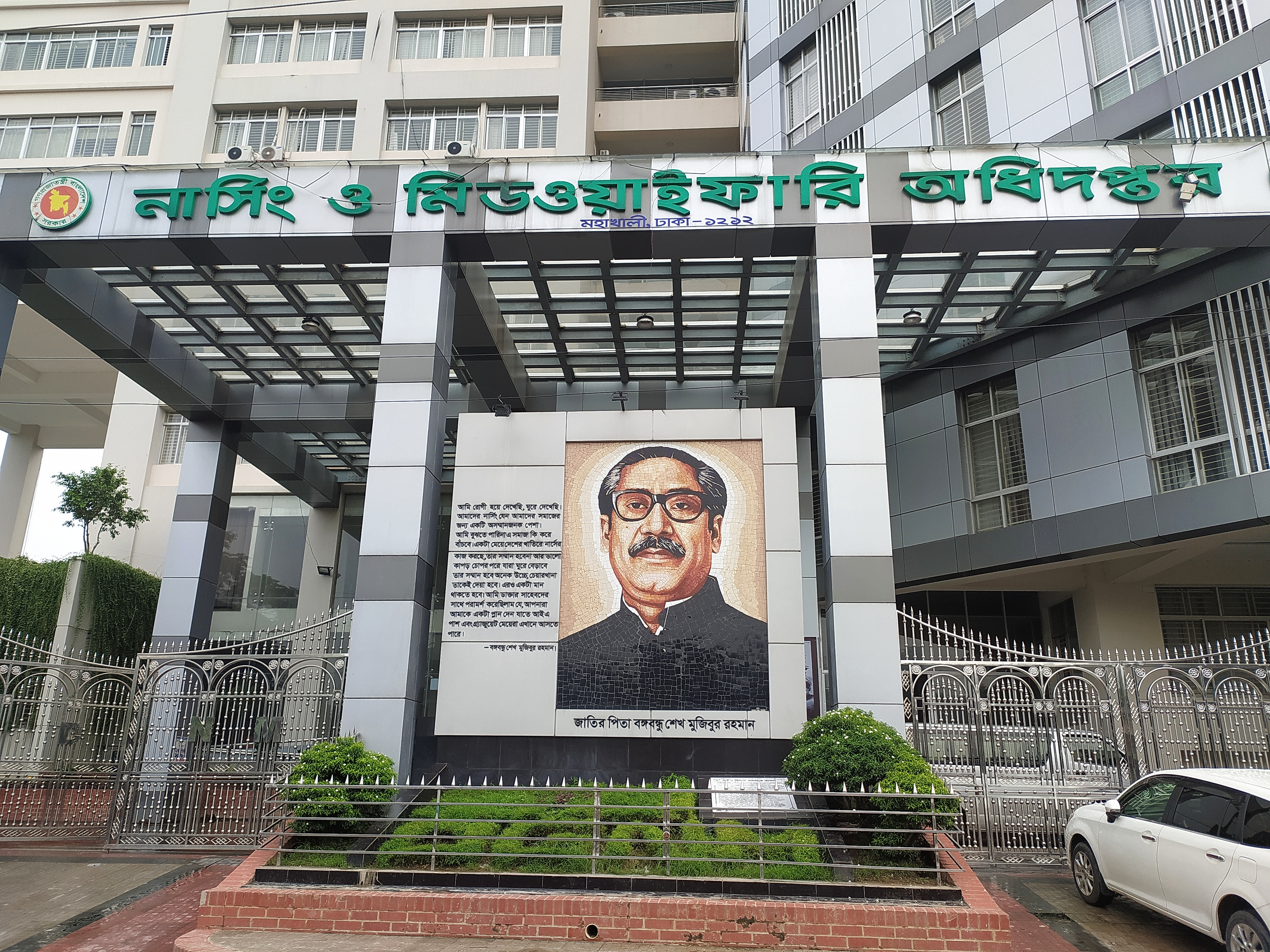
- Formation: 1977
- Headquarters: Dhaka, Bangladesh
- Region served: Bangladesh
- Official language: Bengali
- Director General: Siddika Akter
- Website: dgnm.gov.bd

Directorate General of Nursing and Midwifery (Bengali: নার্সিং ও মিডওয়াইফারি অধিদপ্তর) is the central government body responsible for public nursing and midwifery in Bangladesh and is located in Dhaka, Bangladesh. Siddika Akter took the charge of Director General in 2020.

== History ==
Directorate of Nursing Services was created in 1977 and was later changed to its current form. This was done to expand nursing training in Bangladesh and increase the number of nurses. The directorate falls under the jurisdiction of the Ministry of Health and Family Welfare (Bangladesh).

In January 2021, Prothom Alo wrote a report about how nurses under the directorate general were forced to provide bribes if they wanted to transfer to a different hospital.
