= National Institute of Population Research and Training =

Research institute in Bangladesh

- Formation: 1977
- Headquarters: 13/1 Sheikh Saheb Bazar Road, Azimpur, Dhaka, Bangladesh
- Region served: Bangladesh
- Official language: Bengali
- Website: niport.gov.bd

The National Institute of Population Research and Training (NIPORT) is an autonomous national research institute that researches family planning in Bangladesh and training government officers involved with family planning in Bangladesh and is located in Dhaka, Bangladesh.

== History ==
The institute was formed in July 1977 as the National Institute of Population Training. In 1980 the institute was placed in charge of the Family Welfare Visitors'Training Institutes (Now Regional Population Training Institute-RPTI) and Regional Training Centres(RTC)s. The institute carries out population surveys in Bangladesh. It is under the Ministry of Health and Family Welfare.
