= Bangladesh Nursing and Midwifery Council =

Government regulatory agency

- Formation: 1934
- Location: 203, Shaheed Syed Nazrul Islam Sarani, Bijoynagar, Dhaka, Bangladesh
- Region served: Bangladesh
- Official language: Bengali
- Website: www.bnmc.gov.bd

Bangladesh Nursing and Midwifery Council (Bengali: বাংলাদেশ নার্সিং ও মিডওয়াইফারি কাউন্সিল) is a Bangladesh government regulatory agency under the Ministry of Health and Family Welfare responsible for nursing services and education. Halima Akhter is the head of the council.

== History ==
Bangladesh Nursing and Midwifery Council traces its origins to Indian Nurses Act. 1934, East Pakistan Nursing Council, which was established in 1952 as a regulatory agency on nursing services and education. In 1971, following the Independence of Bangladesh, East Pakistan Nursing Council was renamed to Bangladesh Nursing and Midwifery Council.
