= Manohar Aich =

Bangladeshi bodybuilder (1912–2016)

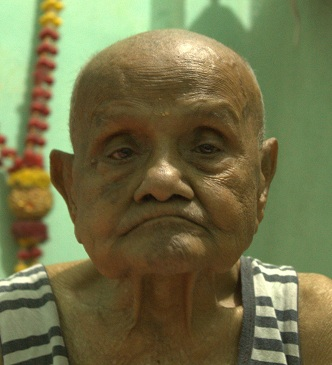

Personal information
- Nationality: Indian
- Born: 17 March 1912 Comilla, Bengal Presidency, British India (now in Bangladesh)
- Died: 5 June 2016 (aged 104) Kolkata, West Bengal, India
- Occupation: Bodybuilder
- Spouse: Jyutika Aich (m. 1924; died 2002)

Manohar Aich (17 March 1912 – 5 June 2016) was an Indian Bengali bodybuilder. He was the second Indian (after Monotosh Roy in 1951) to win any Mr. Universe title. He did so in the 1952 NABBA Universe Championships. At 4 feet 11 inches (1.50 m) tall, he was given the name "Pocket Hercules". Aich has been cited by historians as an influence on Indian physical culture.

== Early life ==
Manohar Aich was born in a kayastha family, since childhood Aich was interested in strength related sports, such as wrestling and weightlifting. At the age of 12, due to a sudden attack of black fever, his health broke down. He regained his strength, however, by physical fitness exercises. He started bodybuilding exercises such as doing push-ups, squats, pull-ups, leg raises, and traditional sit-ups. He only did bodyweight/calisthenics exercises with up to 100 reps per set at that age. He attended the K. L. Jubilee High School & College in Dhaka, Bangladesh. While at school, he used to go to the Ruplal Byayam Samiti for physical exercises. He began to perform in shows titled Physique and Magic along with P. C. Sorcar in Dhanbad. He used to perform feats like bending steel with his teeth, bending spears with his neck and resting his belly on swords.

== Career ==
Aich joined the Royal Air Force in 1942 where he began his pursuit in bodybuilding. He was introduced to weight training by Reub Martin, a British officer in the RAF. While part of the RAF, Aich was imprisoned for slapping a British officer in protest at the officer's remarks in favour of colonial oppression. Aich began his weight training seriously while in jail. He would spend hours in physical exercises. Observing his knack in physical culture, the jail authorities arranged a special diet for him.

In 1950, at the age of 38, Aich won the Mr. Hercules contest. In 1951 he stood second in the Mr. Universe contest. In 1952 he placed first in the Pro-Short division of the NABBA Mr. Universe. At the time his measurements were: biceps 46 cm, chest 1.2 m, forearm 36 cm.

== Physical stats ==
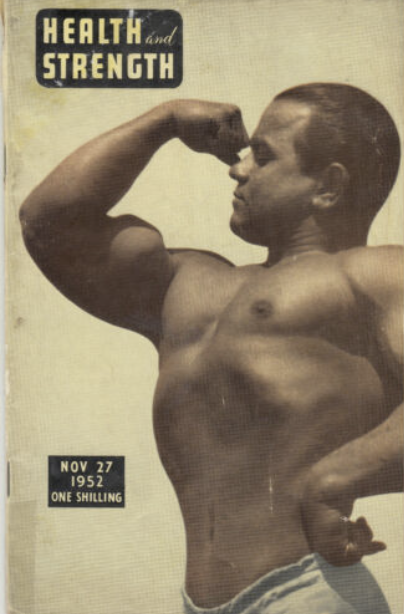
Manohar Aich on the front cover of Strength & Health, 1952

- Height :4'11"
- Chest :1.1938 m (47.00 in) (3 ft. 9 in. )
- Waist :58 cm (23 in)
- Hip :106.68 cm (42.00 in)
- Thigh :73.66 cm (29.00 in)
- Calves :47 cm (19 in)
- Biceps:45.72 cm (18.00 in)(1 ft. 6 in.)
- Forearms:36 cm (14 in)(1 ft. 2 in.)

== In politics ==
In 1991, he had also contested elections for the BJP and finished third, collecting over 163,000 votes. Also, in 2015, he was given the Banga Bibhushan Award by the Government of West Bengal.

== Personal life ==
In March 2012, Aich became a centenarian. He credited his good health with "a simple diet of milk, fruits and vegetables along with rice, lentils and fish" and not allowing any tension to creep into his life. His sons run a gym and a fitness centre, in which Aich helped until the last few days of his life.

== Death ==
On 5 June 2016, Manohar Aich died in Kolkata, aged 104 years.
