= Matuail =

Neighbourhood in Dhaka City, Bangladesh

Coordinates: 23°42′44″N 90°27′35″E

Matuail মাতুয়াইল
- Neighbourhood
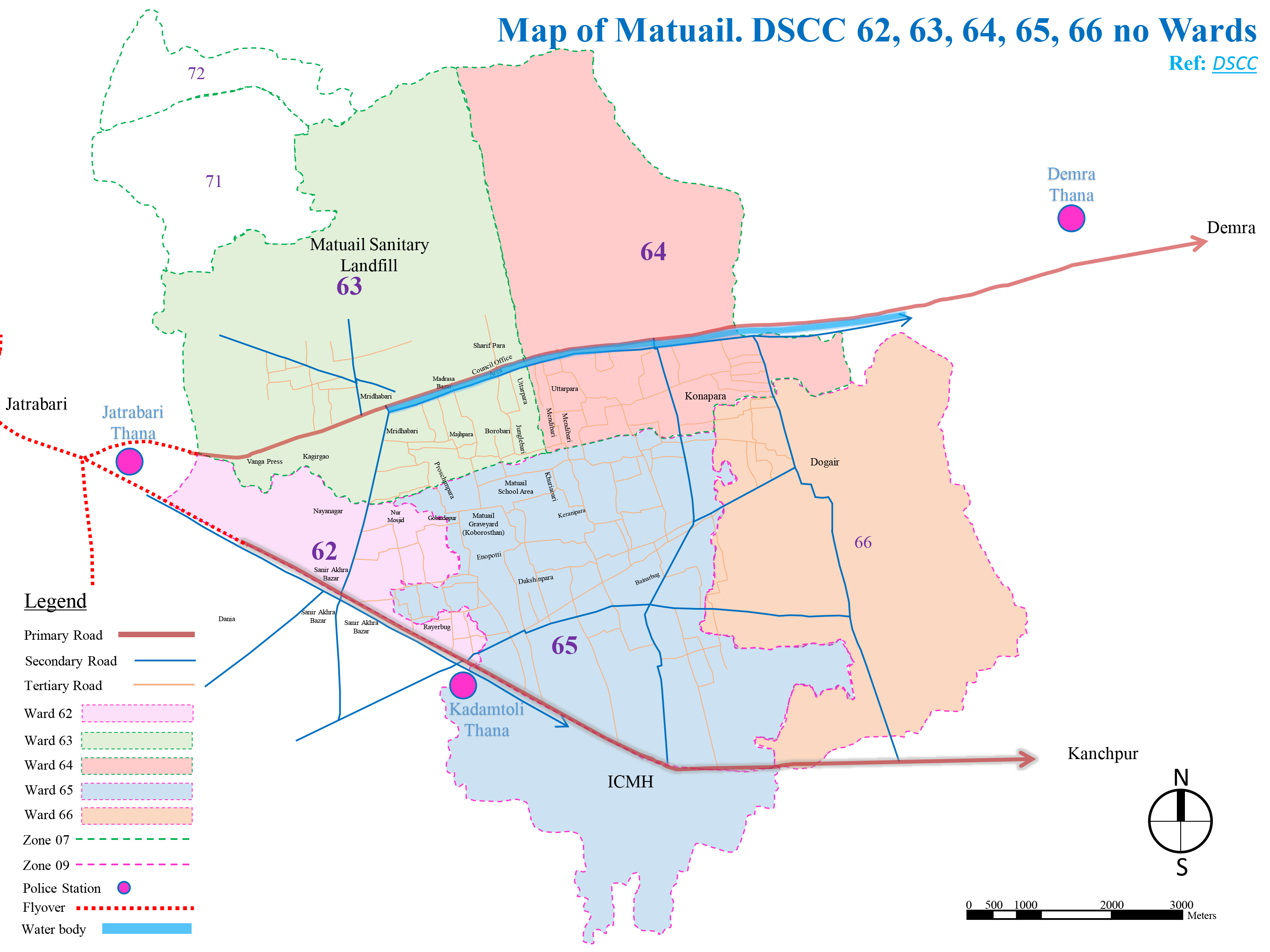
- Map of Matuail
- Interactive map of Matuail
- Country: Bangladesh
- Division: Dhaka Division
- City Corporation: Dhaka South City Corporation
- Wards: 62 (part), 63, 64, 65, 66 (part)
- Incorporated into DSCC: 2016

Area
  - Total: 10.16 km^{2} (3.92 sq mi)
- Time zone: UTC+6 (BST)

Matuail is a neighborhood located in Dhaka South City Corporation (DSCC), partially in Ward no. 62 and 66, and completely in Ward no. 63, 64, and 65, Dhaka Division, Bangladesh.

== History ==
Matuail lies within the Dhaka-Narayanganj-Demra Irrigation Project (DND) area. The project, started in 1962 and completed in 1968, was meant to transform the floodplain of three rivers: the Buriganga, Balu, and Shitalakshya, into an agricultural polder protected by embankments against flooding and drained or irrigated by a pumping station.

Unplanned urbanization and industrialization took off within the DND in 1988 after the Dhaka–Chittagong Highway was completed. By 2005, waterlogging had become a perennial problem there, caused by the lack of a sewage system, encroachment on drainage canals, and inadequate pumping facilities.

Matuail became part of Dhaka South City Corporation in 2016 when Dhaka was expanded to include 16 largely rural union parishads mostly to the east. This increased the pace of urban sprawl. Over the years, numerous projects to address the area's chronic drainage problems have been announced, but as of 2023 they remain unresolved.

== Geography ==
It is located on the north side of the Dhaka–Chittagong Highway and on the south side of the Dhaka-Sylhet (Old Dhaka-Demra) Highway. Its area is 10.16 square kilometres (3.92 sq mi). The area is about 6 kilometres (3.7 mi) away from Motijheel.
