= Bangavax =

Vaccine candidate against COVID-19

Vaccine description
- Target: SARS-CoV-2
- Vaccine type: mRNA

Clinical data
- Other names: Bancovid
- Routes of administration: Intramuscular
- ATC code: None

Bangavax, also known as Bancovid, is a COVID-19 vaccine candidate developed by a Bangladeshi pharmaceutical company Globe Biotech Limited. The vaccine was initially called Bancovid. On 23 November 2021, Globe Biotech has received ethical authorization from the Bangladesh Medical Research Council to conduct the first human trial.

== History ==
On 2 July 2020, Globe Biotech Limited announced to be the first company from Bangladesh to have a COVID-19 vaccine under development. The lone Bangladeshi company actually developed three COVID-19 vaccine candidates with different technologies. The company named the mRNA based vaccine as Bancovid then renamed to Bangavax. Globe Biotech took all the necessary steps from December 2020 to January 2021 to get the permission for ethical approval to conduct the first clinical trial of Bangavax. The Bangladesh government has been criticized for not approval the vaccine even after months to conduct the first clinical trial without any explanation.

Globe Biotech published full research data in the Vaccine journal in May 2021.

After five months of delays Bangladesh Medical Research Council conditionally grants ethical permission. Before proceeding to human trials, they have to apply the vaccine on monkeys or chimpanzees before proceeding to human trials. According to Md Harunur Rashid, chairman of Globe Biotech, "There are two types of mRNA vaccines: pure and modified. The modified one requires trials on monkeys. As Globe is making the pure mRNA one, trials on monkeys are unnecessary. Furthermore, there are no third-party CROs in the country that could conduct monkey trials. Regardless of the drawbacks, Globe will fulfil all the conditions that the government requires it to."

As of February 2022, human clinical trials are underway and are expected to continue for at least six months.
