= Mijanur Rahman =

Bangladeshi academic

- মীজানুর রহমান

Vice-Chancellor of Jagannath University
- In office 20 March 2013 – 19 March 2021
- Preceded by: Mesbah Uddin Ahmed
- Succeeded by: Kamaluddin Ahmed (acting)

Personal details
- Born: 1958 (age 66–67); Comilla, East Pakistan, Pakistan
- Education: Ph.D.
- Alma mater: University of Dhaka; Aligarh Muslim University

Mijanur Rahman (born 1958) is a Bangladeshi academic. He served as the 5th vice-chancellor of Jagannath University during 2013–2021.

== Early life and career ==
Mijanur Rahman was born in Comilla in 1958. He received his bachelor's degree in 1978 and master's degree in 1979 in marketing from the University of Dhaka, followed by a Ph.D. degree in business administration from Aligarh Muslim University in 1994.

Mijanur Rahman was appointed as a professor in the Marketing Department of Dhaka University in 1999. He served as the treasurer of the same university from 2009 to 2012. He published books including Bazarjatkaran, Snatak Bazarjatkaran, Bazarjatkaran Nitimala and Bazarjatkaran.

Mijanur Rahman was appointed vice-chancellor of Jagannath University on March 20, 2013. He was reappointed to the position for a second four-year term on March 19, 2017.
