= Ministry of Health and Family Welfare (Bangladesh) =

Government ministry of Bangladesh

- স্বাস্থ্য ও পরিবার কল্যাণ মন্ত্রণালয়
- Government Seal of Bangladesh

Ministry overview
- Jurisdiction: Government of Bangladesh
- Headquarters: Bangladesh Secretariat, Dhaka
- Annual budget: ৳49387 crore (US$4.0 billion) (2026-2027)
- Minister responsible: Sardar Md. Sakhawat Husain, Minister of Health
- Minister of State responsible: M. A. Muhit, Minister of State for Health
- Ministry executive: Secretary, Health Services Division; Secretary, Medical Education and Family Welfare Division
- Child agencies: Health Services Division; Medical Education and Family Welfare Division
- Website: www.mohfw.gov.bd

The Ministry of Health and Family Welfare (Bengali: স্বাস্থ্য ও পরিবার কল্যাণ মন্ত্রণালয়; Sbāsthya ō paribār kalyāṇ Montronaloya) is a Bangladesh government ministry charged with health policy in Bangladesh. It is also responsible for all government programs relating to family planning in Bangladesh. The Ministry of Health and Family Welfare contains two divisions: Health Services Division and Medical Education And Family Welfare Division.

== Departments ==
=== Health Service Division ===
- Bangladesh National Nutrition Council
- International Centre for Diarrhoeal Disease Research, Bangladesh
- Department of Drug Administration
- Directorate General of Nursing and Midwifery
- Bangladesh Nursing and Midwifery Council
- Health Economics Unit
- Health Engineering Department
- Bangladesh Institute of Child and Mother Health

=== Medical Education And Family Welfare Division ===
- Directorate General of Medical Education
- Directorate General of Nursing and Midwifery
- National Institute of Population Research and Training
- Directorate General of Family Planning

== See also ==
- Government of Bangladesh
- Cabinet of Bangladesh
- Health in Bangladesh
