= Directorate General of Family Planning =

Government agencies of Bangladesh

- Headquarters: Dhaka, Bangladesh
- Region served: Bangladesh
- Official language: Bengali
- Website: Directorate General of Family Planning

Directorate General of Family Planning is a government agency responsible for family planning in Bangladesh and is located in Dhaka, Bangladesh.

== History ==
Family Planning Board and Family Planning Council was established in 1972. In August 1975, the Directorate of Family Planning was established under Division of Population Control and Family Planning under the Ministry of Health and Family Welfare. The family planning council was upgraded to the National Council for Population Control.

In 2013 the websites of the Ministry of Social Welfare and the Directorate General of Family Planning were both hacked by Indonesian hackers. It works under the Ministry of Health and Family Welfare. In January 2016 it was found that the directorate had about 1200 job vacancies. In April 2017 a warehouse owned by the directorate in Mohakhali containing contraceptives burned down. The directorate runs Union level Health and Family Welfare Centre to help control population growth.
