= Directorate General of Drug Administration =

Principal drug regulatory agency in Bangladesh

- Formation: 1976
- Headquarters: Dhaka, Bangladesh
- Region served: Bangladesh
- Official language: Bengali
- Key people: Md. Alamgir Hossain (Director General)
- Parent organization: Ministry of Health and Family Welfare
- Website: Department of Drug Administration

Directorate General of Drug Administration (DGDA) is the principal drug regulatory agency in Bangladesh and it functions under the Ministry of Health and Family Welfare.

== History ==
Directorate General of Drug Administration was established in 1976 under the Ministry of Health and Family Welfare as a separate department. It was upgraded on 17 January 2010. The department is responsible for issuing licenses to pharmaceutical companies. The Drug Control Committee of the department decides on drug registration.
