= Health Services Division =

Division of government in Bangladesh

- Formation: 2017
- Headquarters: Dhaka, Bangladesh
- Region served: Bangladesh
- Official language: Bengali
- Website: hsd.gov.bd

The Health Services Division (স্বাস্থ্য সেবা বিভাগ) is a Bangladesh government division under the Ministry of Health and Family Welfare responsible for healthcare in Bangladesh. Jahangir Alam is the secretary of the division.

== History ==
In the 1970s the ministry had two divisions but they were combined in 1985. The Health Services Division was established on 16 March 2017 through the bifurcation of the Ministry of Health and Family Welfare.

== Controversy ==
On 17 April 2021, Rozina Islam, a journalist of Prothom Alo, went to the Health Ministry office in the Bangladesh Secretariat for reporting. She was confined in the ministry for five hours and her cell phones were seized. She was then arrested from the Ministry. Sibbir Ahmed Osmani, deputy secretary of the Health Services Division, filed a case against her around midnight of 17 April 2021 with Shahbagh police station under the Official Secrets Act.
