= Family planning in Bangladesh =

Family planning in Bangladesh is carried out by government agencies and supported by non-government organisations. The Directorate General of Family Planning is the government agency responsible for family planning in Bangladesh. Marie Stopes Bangladesh is an international NGO that provides family planning services in Bangladesh.

In 1975, the population of Bangladesh was 76.3 million, and by 2020 the population had reached 164.7 million. Bangladesh has a fertility rate of 2.01, which, according to United Nations Population Fund, makes it a "low fertility country". Bangladesh has a high population density, with about 1123.85 people per square kilometre. Since independence Bangladesh has reduced its total fertility rate (TFR) to 2.01, which means that women have 2.01 children on average. At this TFR and without migration a country's population is neither growing nor shrinking. Bangladesh family planning programs have been described as being weakened in recent years.

== History ==
In 1950, family planning was introduced by medical volunteers and social workers. In 1965, the Government of Pakistan started a family planning program in East Pakistan. In 1976, the government of Bangladesh declared rapid population growth rate as the nation's number one problem. Bangladesh has experienced rapid population growth since its independence. This was a result of a high fertility rate, increased life expectancy, and a decreasing mortality rate. In 1975, the total fertility rate was 6.3, which by 2011 was reduced to 2.3 according to the data collected by the Bangladesh Demographic Health Survey 2011. The survey found most women have two or more children. It also found that the majority of women in Bangladesh would prefer to have two or less Children. Since 2011 the total fertility rate has remained at 2.3, according to the International Conference on Family Planning, family planning in Bangladesh has not made progress since then. Infant mortality fell from 160,300 in 2000 to 83,100 by 2015 according to The Lancet. Bangladesh is ranked 7 worldwide in number of stillbirths. Bangladesh Demographic Health Survey 2014 found that 33% of 15 to 19 year olds were pregnant. Sixty-six percent of the population give birth before age 19. Family Service is supported by UNFPA in Bangladesh.

== Underage marriage ==
According to official government estimates in Bangladesh 65% of girls are married off before their 18th birthday. 60 percent of child brides have children by the time they are 19 and 10 percent of them have children by the time they are 15. Bangladesh's Penal Code places the age of consent at 14, though sex before marriage is frowned upon socially. According to the Child Marriage Restraint Act-2017, a child marriage would be legal in Bangladesh, if it was for the interest of the underage girl and with the consent of the parents.

== Fertility ==
The total fertility rate was 2.3 children per woman in 2019. The median age at first birth among women of child-bearing age is 18.6 years. 43% of women gave birth before turning 18. The fertility rate has an inverse relationship with the level of education. Women with no education or an incomplete primary education have an average of 2.6 children, on the contrary women with a secondary education or higher have an average of 2.2 children. In Bangladesh, the median age at first birth among women age 20-49 is 18.6 years. 28% of women age 15-19 have begun childbearing. Childbearing is less common among urban teenagers than among rural teenagers (23% versus 29%).

Fertility by the level of education
Education	Total fertility rate	Percentage of women age 15-49 currently pregnant	Mean number of children ever born to women age 40-49
No education	2.6	1.4	4
Primary incomplete	2.6	4.2	3.9
Primary complete	2.4	5.3	3.7
Secondary incomplete	2.3	5.6	3.2
Secondary complete or above	2.2	6.1	2.4

== Contraceptives ==
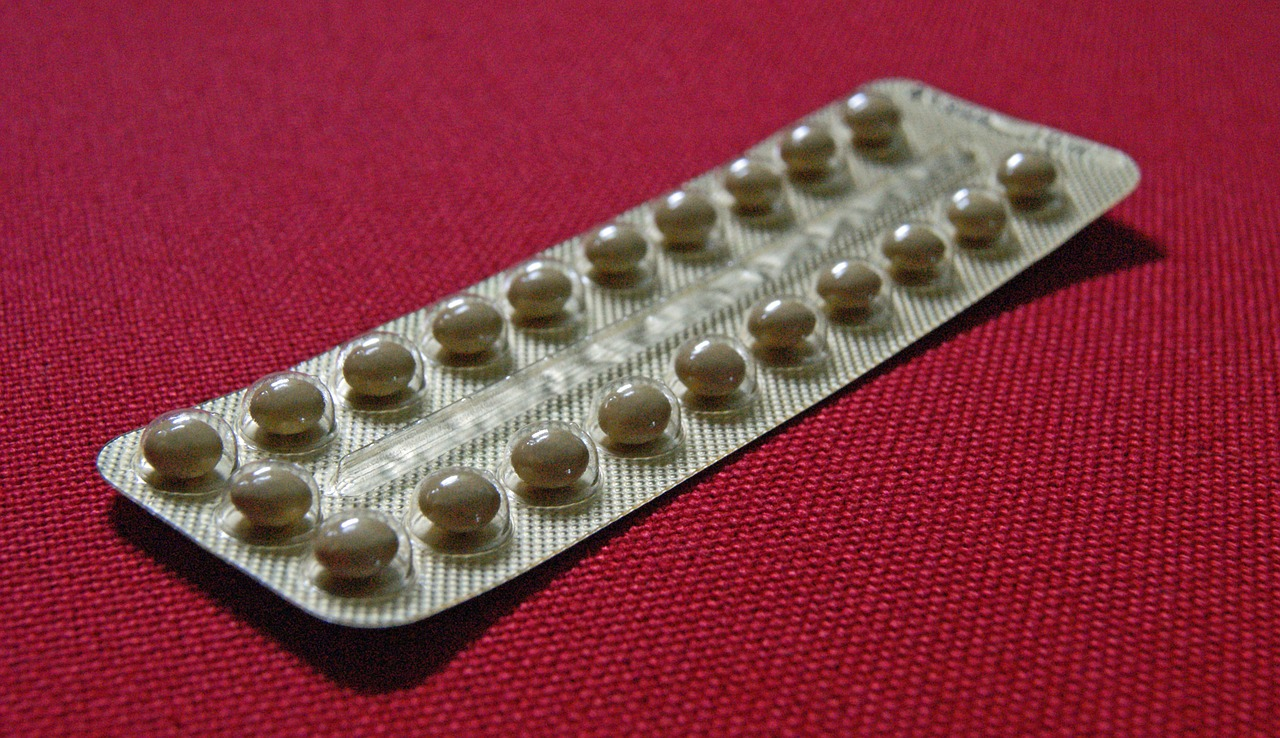
Oral Contraceptive Pill

The contraceptive prevalence rate is 62% among currently married women aged 15–49. Among them, 52% of women use modern contraceptive methods, and 10% use traditional methods. Oral pill is the most commonly used method (25%). 12% of currently married women in Bangladesh have an unmet need for family planning. Use of modern contraceptives is highest in Rangpur division (59%) and lowest in Chattogram and Sylhet divisions (45% each). contraceptive usage is higher among urban couples than among rural couples (65% versus 60%). Half (49%) of modern contraceptive users obtained their method from a private sector like pharmacies, 44% from the public sector, 5% from a nongovernmental organization (NGO), and 1% from another source.

Percentage of married women using contraceptives
Year	Modern method	Traditional method
1999	44	10
2004	48	10
2007	48	8
2011	52	9
2014	54	8
2018	52	10

== Family planning services ==
86% of health facilities provided modern family planning services in 2017. But 31% of district hospitals and 75% of private facilities still do not provide family planning methods. Only 1/4th of the facilities provide long-acting reversible contraceptives or permanent methods (LARC/PMs), and even less provide male or female sterilization. Combined or progestin-only oral pills and male condoms (85% each) are the most commonly provided temporary modern methods. More than 60% of facilities provide progestin-only injectables. One-fourth of all facilities provide IUCDs, and a small proportion (6%) offer one or two-rod implants.

== See also ==
- Human population planning
