= Directorate of Registration =

Bangladeshi governmental directorate

- Formation: 1973
- Headquarters: Dhaka, Bangladesh
- Region served: Bangladesh
- Official language: Bengali
- Website: Directorate of Registration

Directorate of Registration (Bengali: নিবন্ধন অধিদপ্তর) is a Bangladesh government directorate under the Ministry of Law, Justice and Parliamentary Affairs, which responsible for registration of property and collecting registration tax. It is also responsible for registration of marriage in Bangladesh.

== History ==
Directorate of Registration was established in 1973 by the Government of Bangladesh as the Registration Department. In January 2018, the Registration Department was upgraded to Directorate of Registration following the instruction of Prime Minister Sheikh Hasina. Minister of Law, Justice and Parliamentary Affairs, Anisul Huq, on 23 March 2019 criticized corruption within the directorate.
