= Abdul Malek (commissioner) =

Former Chief Information Commissioner of Bangladesh

- আব্দুল মালেক

Information Commissioner of Bangladesh
- In office 22 March 2023 – 10 September 2024
- Preceded by: Abdul Malek

Personal details
- Born: 31 December 1959 (age 66) Bauphal, Patuakhali
- Education: BSS in Department of Public Administration
- Alma mater: University of Dhaka

Abdul Malek (Bengali: আবদুল মালেক) is the former Chief Information Commissioner, former secretary of the Ministry of Information and commissioner of Information Commission. He was born in Patuakhali district of Bangladesh. He was the secretary of the Local Government Division. He is a former chairman of Bangladesh Inland Water Transport Authority.

== Early life and education ==
Malek was born in Sabupura village in Bauphal Upazila, Patuakhali District. He obtained BSS (Hons) and postgraduate degree from the Department of Public Administration, Dhaka University. He later earned an LLB degree.

== Career ==
Malek started his career in 1986 by joining the government as an assistant commissioner after passing the Bangladesh Civil Service exam. He held various posts at various district and upazila levels in Bangladesh. These include Bogra, Sirajganj, Rajshahi, Jamalpur, Mymensingh, Rangpur, Magura and Khulna districts. Malek served as the Deputy Commissioner of Comilla District. He had also served as the Deputy Commissioner of Jessore District where he inaugurated a monument to Bangladesh Liberation War. He also held various posts in the Ministry of Public Administration, Ministry of Textiles and Jute, Anti-Corruption Bureau, Ministry of Labor and Employment and Ministry of Land.

In 2010, Malek was the chairman of Bangladesh Inland Water Transport Authority. During an inspection of the authorities Chandpur District he discovered irregularities and expressed his discontentment.

He has also served as the Commissioner-1 to the Local Government Department. He is a former Personal Secretary-1 to Prime Minister Sheikh Hasina. Prior to joining the Ministry of Information and Broadcasting, he was the Secretary to the Department of Local Government. He retired as Secretary on 30 December 2019. On 30 January 2020, Malek was appointed Information Commissioner with the rank of a senior secretary.

In February 2022, Malek's name was proposed for commissioner of Bangladesh Election Commission.

=== Association ===
Malek has served as president of Bangladesh Administrative Services Association, current president of Bangladesh Badminton Federation, syndicate member of the University of Barisal, Patuakhali Science and Technology University and senate member of National University, Bangladesh.
