= Golam Rahman =

Former Chairman of the Bangladesh Sangbad Sangstha

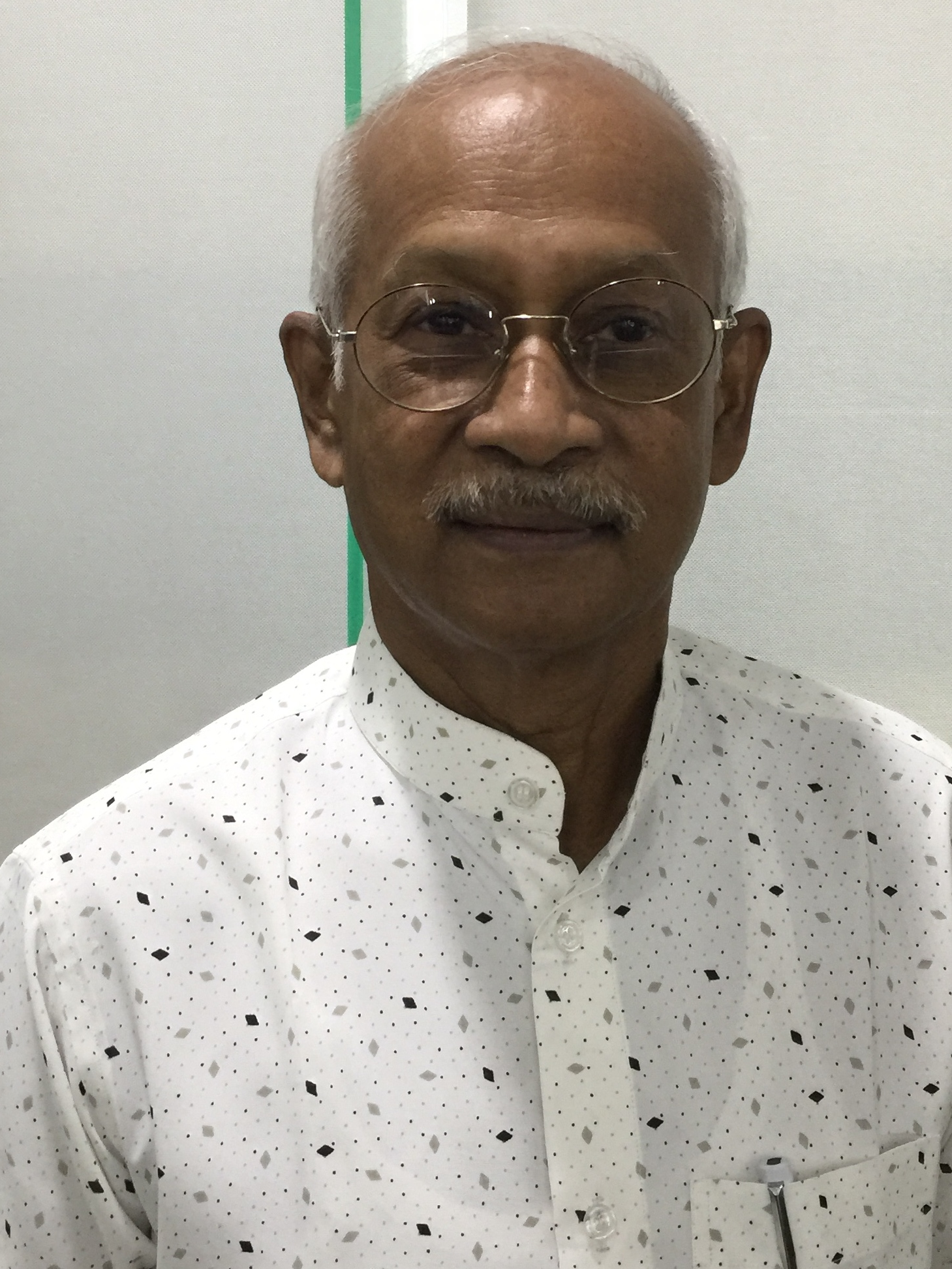
- Rahman in Dhaka, 2018
- Born: 7 January 1951 (age 75); Sherpur District, Bangladesh
- Citizenship: Bangladeshi
- Education: PhD
- Alma mater: University of Dhaka
- Employer(s): University of Dhaka, Daffodil International University
- Organization: Information Commission
- Known for: Educationist, media researcher and communication expert

Golam Rahman (born 7 January 1951) is an educationist, media researcher and communication expert of Bangladesh. He has served as the Chief Information Commissioner of the Information Commission of Government of Bangladesh. He also served as the chairman of Bangladesh Sangbad Sangstha (BSS) the chairman of the department of mass communication and journalism of University of Dhaka as well as head of journalism department of Daffodil International University. He is the editor of Bengali daily Ajker Patrika.

== Birth and education ==
Rahman was born on 7 January 1951 in Sherpur District. He passed Secondary School Certificate (SSC) from Sherpur Victoria Academy in 1966 and passed Higher Secondary School Certificate (HSC) from Jagannath College in 1968. Later, he graduated from Ashek Mahmud College in Jamalpur District in 1972 and got a Post-Graduate Diploma in Journalism degree from the department of mass communication and journalism from University of Dhaka. He took the first position in the first class and received two gold medals in the post-graduate examination of journalism at the Mysore University, with the scholarship of the Government of India. He obtained PhD in journalism and mass communication from the same university in 1986.

== Politics and liberation war ==
Rahman was associated with progressive student politics in the student life. He was an active activist of mass movement in 1969. In 1971, he took part in the liberation war. He fought in Sector 11.

== Career ==
Rahman started journalism in the 1970s as the Daily Azad and Sherpur district correspondent of the Bangladesh Times. In 1977, he started his career as a journalist in Eastern News Agency (ENA). In that year, he joined Bangladesh University of Engineering and Technology (BUET). He became a lecturer in the mass communication and journalism department of University of Dhaka in 1978. He has long been a professor of Mass Communication and journalism department of Dhaka University and he served as the chairman of the same department until 1990–93. Joining the Information Commission as Chief Information Commissioner and He was the chairman of the Bangladesh Sangbad Sangstha (BSS) before. He was a pro vice-chancellor of Daffodil International University in 2014–15. He has been a professor in the department of mass communication and journalism of Dhaka University for almost four decades and served as provost of Bangabandhu Sheikh Mujibur Rahman Hall of the same university.

Rahman also was professor and head of department of language and communication studies (2008–2010) of the University of Technology, Papua New Guinea. Rahman is also acting as the chairman of the National Broadcasting Policy. He is also the chairman of Asian Media, Information and Communication (AMIC) Bangladesh Representative and worked as a media specialist of the UN's International Drug Controller Project. He was the vice-president of the Commonwealth Association for Educationals in Journalism and Communication (CAJAC). He is a member of the Bangladesh Sensor Board Appellate Committee.

== Published books ==
- Communication Issues in Bangladesh [বাংলাদেশে যোগাযোগের সমস্যা], Ananda Publications, 1999
- State of Democracy in Bangladesh [বাংলাদেশে গণতন্ত্রের রাষ্ট্র], Jointly from IIDEI, 2002
- Assignment Bangladesh
- Journalists Views: Contemporary Agriculture in Bangladesh [সাংবাদিকদের মতামত: বাংলাদেশে সমসাময়িক কৃষি], Edited book, 2002
- Journalists Views: Agriculture in Bangladesh [সাংবাদিকদের মতামত: বাংলাদেশে কৃষি], Edited book, 2004
- 'Media Responses: Communication Strategies and Campaign in Bangladesh' [বাংলাদেশে 'মিডিয়ার প্রতিক্রিয়া: বাংলাদেশে যোগাযোগ কৌশল এবং প্রচারাভিযান']
