= 2016 Narayanganj City Corporation election =

Mayoral election in Bangladesh

- 22 December 2016
- Registered: 484,931 (▲4.73 pp)
- Turnout: 62.33% (▲1.30 pp)
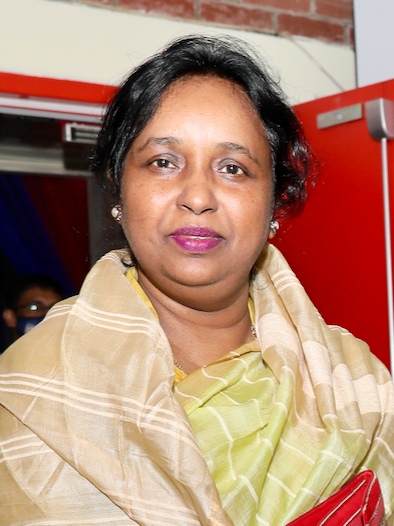
	First party	Second party
Candidate	Selina Hayat Ivy	Sakhawat Hossain Khan
Party	AL	BNP
Popular vote	175,611	96,044
Percentage	58.09%	31.77%
Swing	▲58.09pp	▲29.10pp
Mayor before election
Selina Hayat Ivy
Independent
Elected Mayor
Selina Hayat Ivy
AL
- Council election
- 22 December 2016; 36 seats in the Narayanganj City Corporation
Party	Leader	Seats	+/–
AL	Selina Hayat Ivy	15	+15
BNP	Sakhawat Hossain Khan	9	+9
JP(E)	—	2	+2
BSD	—	1	+1
Independent	—	9	+9
This lists parties that won seats. See the complete results below.

The 2016 Narayanganj City Corporation election was a local government election in Narayanganj, Bangladesh, held on 22 December 2016 to elect the Mayor of Narayanganj and the Narayanganj City Council. In the election, Awami League candidate Selina Hayat Ivy contested under her party banner for the first time since the establishment of the city corporation in 2011 and led her party to victory. She secured her second consecutive term by defeating her closest rival, BNP candidate Sakhawat Hossain Khan.

== Mayoral Election result ==
Narayanganj Mayoral Election 2016
Party	Candidate	Votes	%	±%
AL	Dr. Selina Hayat Ivy	175,611	64.10	+8.64
BNP	Sakhawat Hossain Khan	96,044	35.06	+27.24
Majority		79,567	29.04	−6.83
Turnout		271,655	56.02	−5.01
Registered electors		484,931		
AL gain from Independent				

== Council election results ==
=== Party-wise ===
2016 Narayanganj City Corporation council election results (party-wise)
Party	Winning seats
Bangladesh Awami League	15
Bangladesh Nationalist Party	9
Jatiya Party (Ershad)	2
Socialist Party of Bangladesh	1
Independent	9
Total	36
