= Murder of Sabbir Alam Khandaker =

Murder's history of Bangladesh

The murder of Sabbir Alam Khandaker refers to the murder of businessman Sabbir Alam Khandaker in Narayanganj, Bangladesh in 2003. His brother, Taimur Alam Khandaker, was then a politician of the Bangladesh Nationalist Party and chairman of the Bangladesh Road Transport Corporation. The main accused in the murder case was Giasuddin Ahmed, an Awami League member of parliament. After the fall of the Sheikh Hasina-led Awami League government, on 7 January 2025, Narayanganj Additional District and Sessions Judge Mominul Islam acquitted all the accused in the Murder of Sabbir Alam Khandaker case.

== Background ==
Sabbir Alam Khandaker was a Bangladeshi businessman. He was a founding director and vice president of the Bangladesh Knitwear Manufacturers and Exporters Association. He was a politician of the Jatiya Party (Ershad). His brother, Taimur Alam Khandaker, was then a politician of the Bangladesh Nationalist Party and Chairman of Bangladesh Road Transport Corporation. He supported Operation Clean Heart and demanded the arrest of criminals. A few days before his murder, he had requested the civil administration to attend his funeral.

== History ==
Sabbir Alam Khandaker was shot dead outside his home on 18 February 2003. Taimur Alam Khandaker filed a murder case following the murder. The main accused in the murder case was Giasuddin Ahmed, a Member of Parliament. The case had nine investigators before ASP Masihuddin of the Criminal Investigation Department filed charges on 8 January 2006 against eight. He had dropped the name of Giasuddin Ahmed and his brothers. Taimur petitioned against the charges and requested that Giasuddin Ahmed be reinstated as an accused in the case. The case was pending with the Narayanganj Judicial Magistrate’s Court.

In 2011, Taimur Alam Khandaker withdrew his petition to add the name of Giasuddin Ahmed in return for his support in the Narayanganj City Corporation election.

The Rapid Action Battalion-11 arrested Zakir Khan, accused in the murder case of Sabbir Alam Khandaker, in 2022 with an illegal gun from Bashundhara Residential Area. He had fled to Thailand and returned to Bangladesh one year ago through India. Taimur Alam Khandaker testified against Zakir in court.

After the fall of the Sheikh Hasina-led Awami League government, on 7 January 2025, Narayanganj Additional District and Sessions Judge Mominul Islam acquitted all the accused in the Murder of Sabbir Alam Khandaker case. Jakir Khan, President of the Narayanganj District unit of the Jatiyatabadi Chhatra Dal and accused in 33 criminal cases, including the murder of Sabbir Alam Khandaker, was released on 13 April 2025 after securing bail or being acquitted in all the cases filed against him. After his release, he led a motorcade from prison, causing a two-hour traffic jam on the Dhaka-Narayanganj link road and Bangabandhu Road.
