= Amlapara =

Ward in Narayangan, Bangladesh

Amlapara আমলাপাড়া
- Moholla
- Interactive map of Amlapara
- Coordinates: 23.6218°N 90.5027°E
- Country: Bangladesh
- Division: Dhaka
- District: Narayanganj

Government
  - Type: Narayanganj City Corporation
- Postal code: 1400

Amlapara (Bengali: আমলাপাড়া) is located midpoint of Narayanganj City of Bangladesh. Now this is 13 No ward of Narayanganj City Corporation. This is most residential area and Heart of the city. It is surrounded by city main road. One can receive any service for example : bus stand, rail station, river terminal, market place by walking within 5 to 10 minutes. This is combined by three main branches road named K B Shaha Road, K.B Saha By Lane (Sreemoti Alladi BiBi Road) and so H K Benarjee Road. There are many public and private primary school, high school, college as well as Narayanganj Girls High School & College And Narayanganj Ideal School, Religious University Amlapara Madrasa also. Here is life style enriched among the people. The Asrafia Jame Mosque is a notable place of worship in the neighbourhood.

== Geography ==
In North– Dhaka-Narayanganj Road, Nawab Salimullah Road (New Metro Cinema Hall Morh), South– S K road, A C Darh Road, East– Half part of Nawab Siraj-u-Dowla Road, From AC Darh Road to New Metro Cinema Hall Morh, West– B B Road, Eastern Part of Narayanganj Girls’ High School.
