= Idrakpur Fort =

Historical Symbol of Munshiganj

Coordinates: 23.5474°N 90.5340°E

- ইদ্রাকপুর দুর্গ
- Munshiganj, Bangladesh
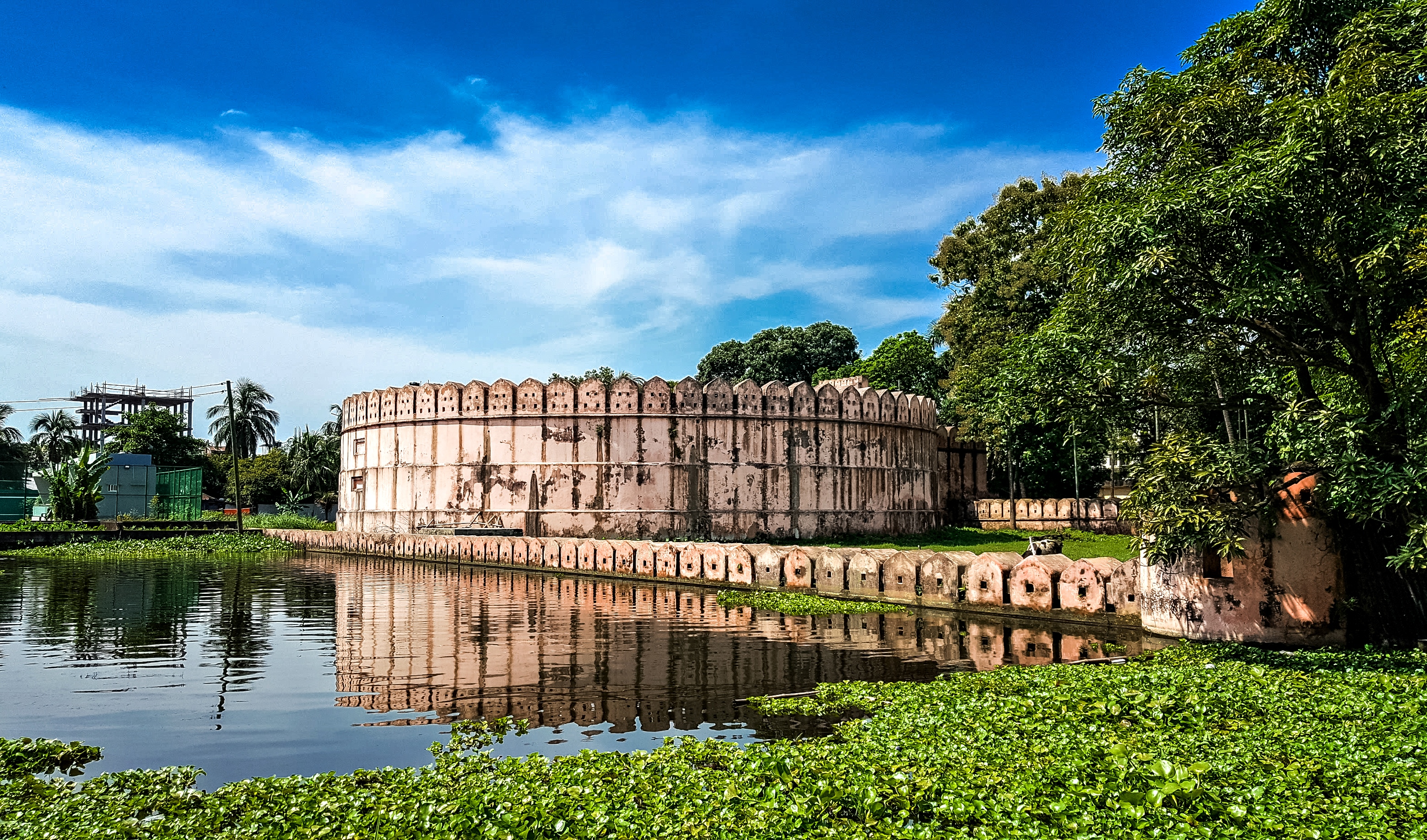

Site information
- Controlled by: Department of Archaeology (Bangladesh)
- Open to the public: Yes

Site history
- Built: 1660 AD
- Built by: Mir Jumla II

Idrakpur Fort (Bengali: ইদ্রাকপুর দুর্গ) is a river fort situated in Munshiganj, Bangladesh. The fort was built approximately in 1660 A.D. According to a number of historians, the river fort was built by Mir Jumla II, a Subahdar of Bengal under the Mughal Empire, to establish the control of Mughal Empire in Munsiganj, and to defend Dhaka and Narayanganj from the pirates.

The fort was a part of the triangular defence strategy for the vulnerable river route, from where the pirates used to attack Dhaka. The strategy was developed by Mir Jumla II with the help of the other two forts in Narayanganj- the Hajiganj Fort and the Sonakanda Fort.

== Background ==
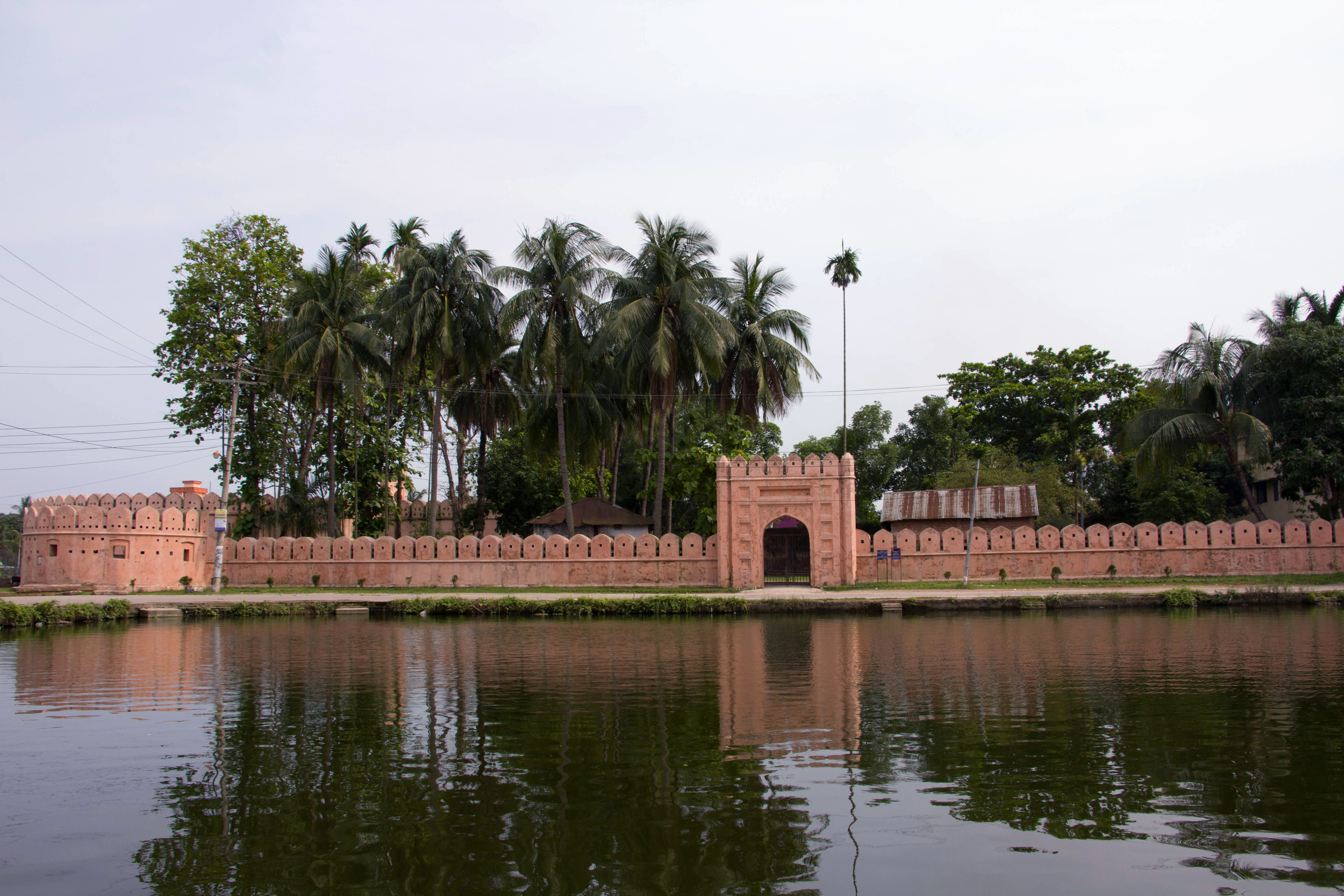
Entrance to the fort

Mughals took over the control of the Bengal in 1574 AD after defeating Daud Khan Karrani. Mughals exercised a progressive rule in Bengal. Bengal was then a very wealthy province and was frequently attacked by the pirates.

The Mughal Empire was then locked into a civil war regarding the succession of Emperor Shah Jahan. Shah Shuja, the second son of Shah Jahan and the Subahdar of Bengal, led a campaign to Agra to take over the throne. Aurangzeb, after his accession to the throne wanted to appoint a man with high skills in naval warfare as the river-oriented Bengal was the strong hold of Shah Shuja. So he entrusted Mir Muhammad Saeed Ardestani alias Mir Jumla II who was a successful trader in maritime trades in first life, to deal with Shah Shuja.

Mir Jumla II rushed to the Bengal compelling Shah Shuja to retreat. Later, Mir Jumla II was appointed as the Subahdar or the governor of the then Bengal province in 1660.

Mir Jumla was aware of the pirates who used to run a campaign of terror in the important cities of Bengal. After his appointment as the Subahdar, he shifted the capital of Bengal to Dhaka from Rajmahal. In a quest to protect the capital Dhaka from the pirates, Mir Jumla II developed a triangular defence strategy and decided to build up three river forts near Dhaka. One of these three forts is Idrakpur Fort of Munshiganj.

== History ==
Idrakpur, now Munshiganj was a strategically very significant point as it was the junction of a number of rivers including Meghna River, Shitalakshya River, Ichhamati River and Dhaleshwari River. The fort was built on the bank of the junction of Ichhamati River and Meghna River.

The Portuguese and Magh pirates used this point to move forward to Dhaka through Shitalakshya River. On their way to Dhaka they used to loot other important cities like Sonargaon and Bikrampur.

Mir Jumla II was determined to protect Dhaka and eager to develop the wealthy area Bikrampur. So, he came up with a triangular defence strategy to protect the cities from the Portuguese pirates.

Idrakpur Fort was the centre of his strategy. The erection of the fort was intended to check the advance of the Magh and Portuguese pirates proceeding towards the Mughal capital city of Dhaka. The fort was also used as the naval base of the naval fleet of 200 frigates under Mughal admiral Abul Hossain.

According to the strategy, whenever the pirates made an attempt to advance to Dhaka the Mughal soldiers would be ordered to start firing mortars both from the cannons of their 200 battleships and from the Idrakpur Fort leaving the pirates with no options but to retreat or die on the rivers.

However, if any of the pirate ships survived the initial attack and tried to advance to Dhaka the Sonakanda Fort and the Hajiganj Fort, situated on the eastern and western bank of Shitalakshya River respectively, would start throwing round-shots to those ships and vessels and sink all the pirate ships on the river. It was probably built in about 1660 A.D.

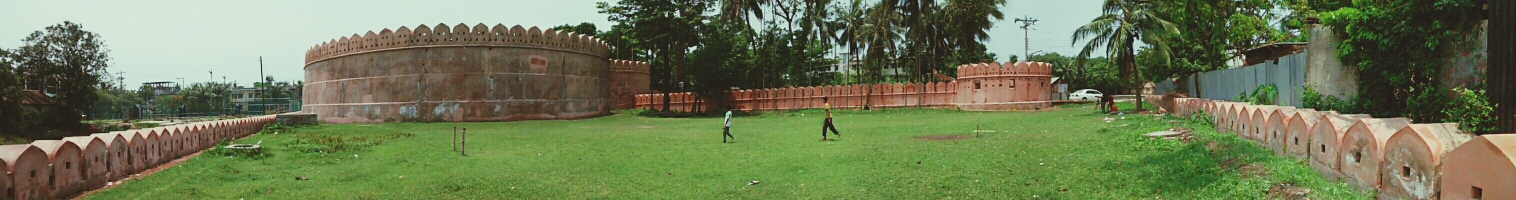
Idrakpur Fort

== Architecture ==
Idrakpur river-fort is different from the other Mughal forts and has a number of unique features.

The fort is apparently divided into two parts- the eastern part and the western part. The quadrangular eastern part and the polygonal western part combined into the complete fort.

The brick built fort comprises a wider open area surrounded by wall with bastions at the angles. The thick wall runs from north to south measuring 86.87-meter in length and 59.60-meter in width. The wall has machicolations from where the enemies on the river was targeted and the mortars were fired. There are a number of towers from where the movement of the enemies were observed.

The most significant feature of the fort is the circular drum it has in the eastern part of the fort. The circular drum is further enclosed by another fortification wall, which was used for mounting a huge cannon. The elevated circular drum of 32.5-meter in diameter and 9.14-meter high and can be reached by a staircase. The drum comprises three subsequent layers.

Another remarkable feature of the fort is the existence of a staircase leading to a secret room at the foot of the drum. The staircase leads to a secret underground chamber which was the magazine or storehouse for arms and explosives. According to some myth the staircase was a part of the secret tunnel linked with Lalbagh Fort.

The main entrance gate of the fort is on the north with a high rectangular bastion crowned by machicolated merlons which served as a guard room.

== Gallery ==
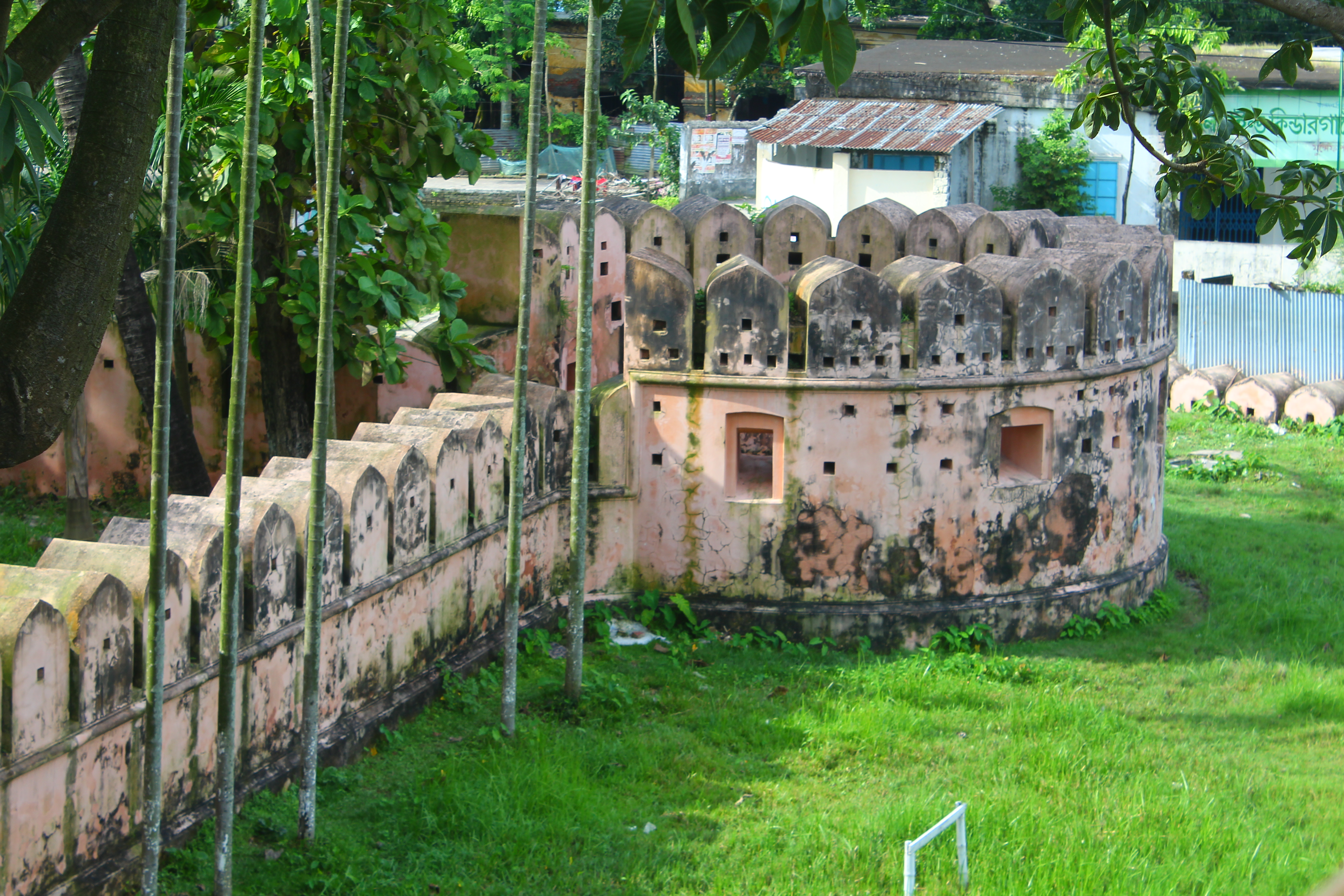

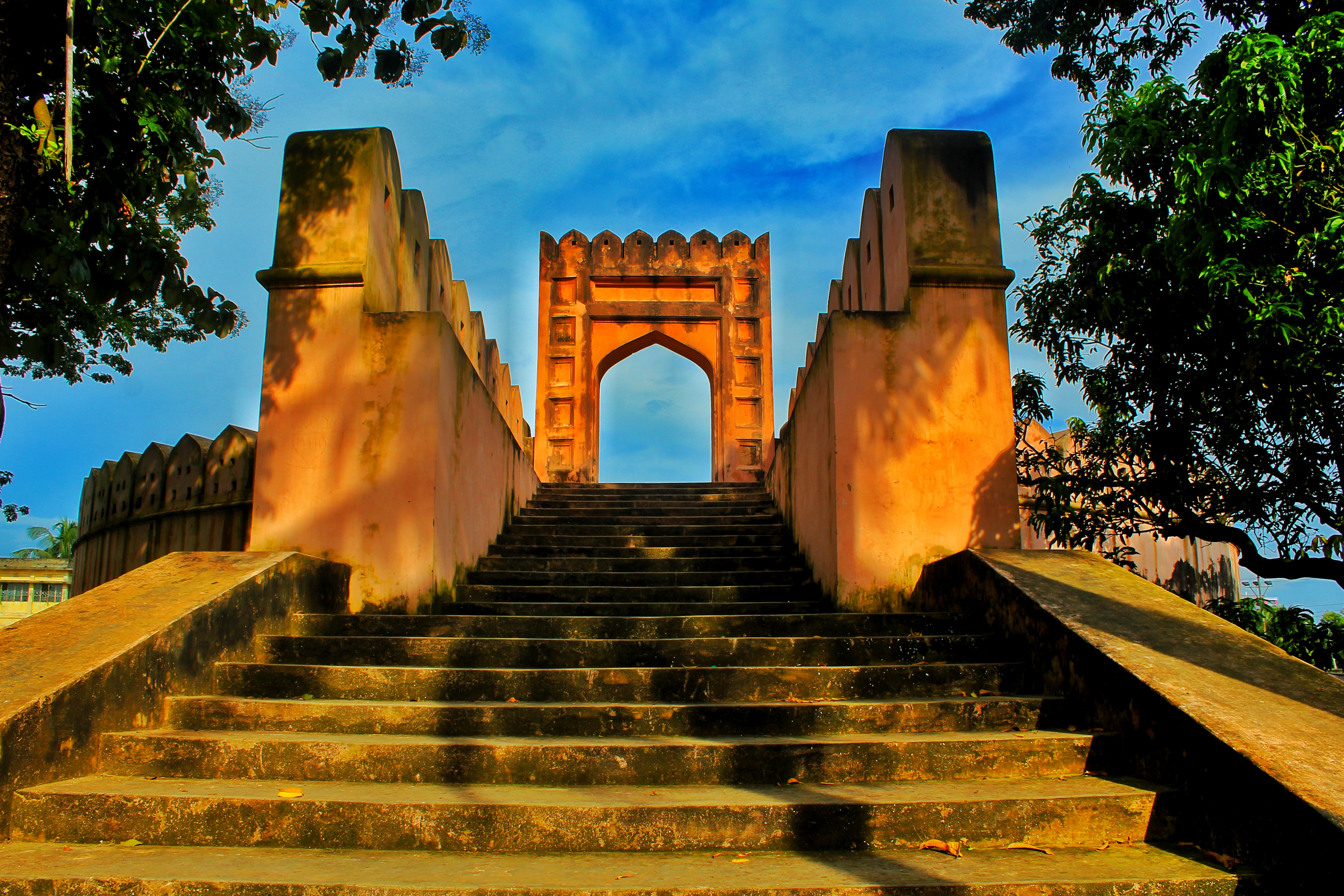

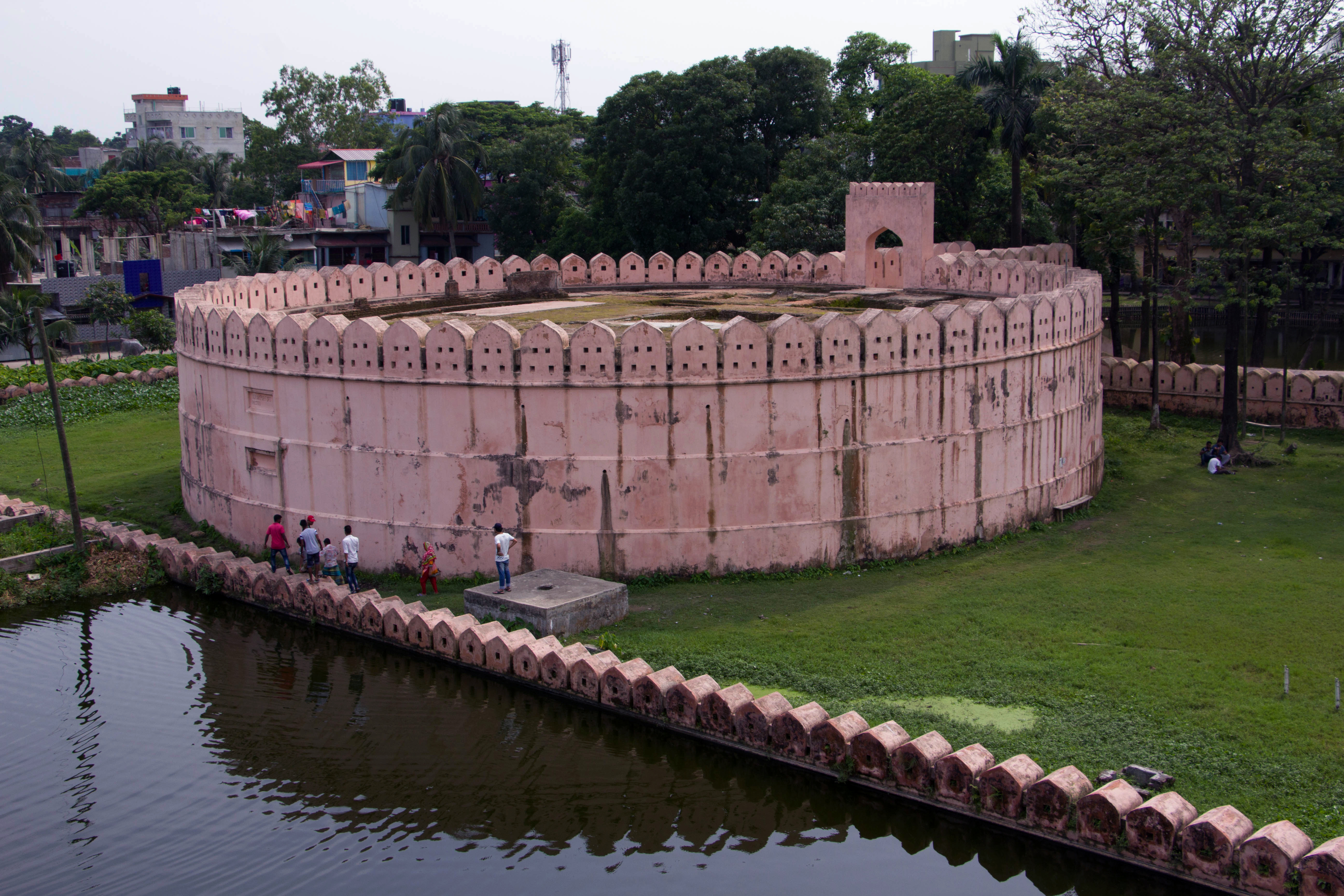

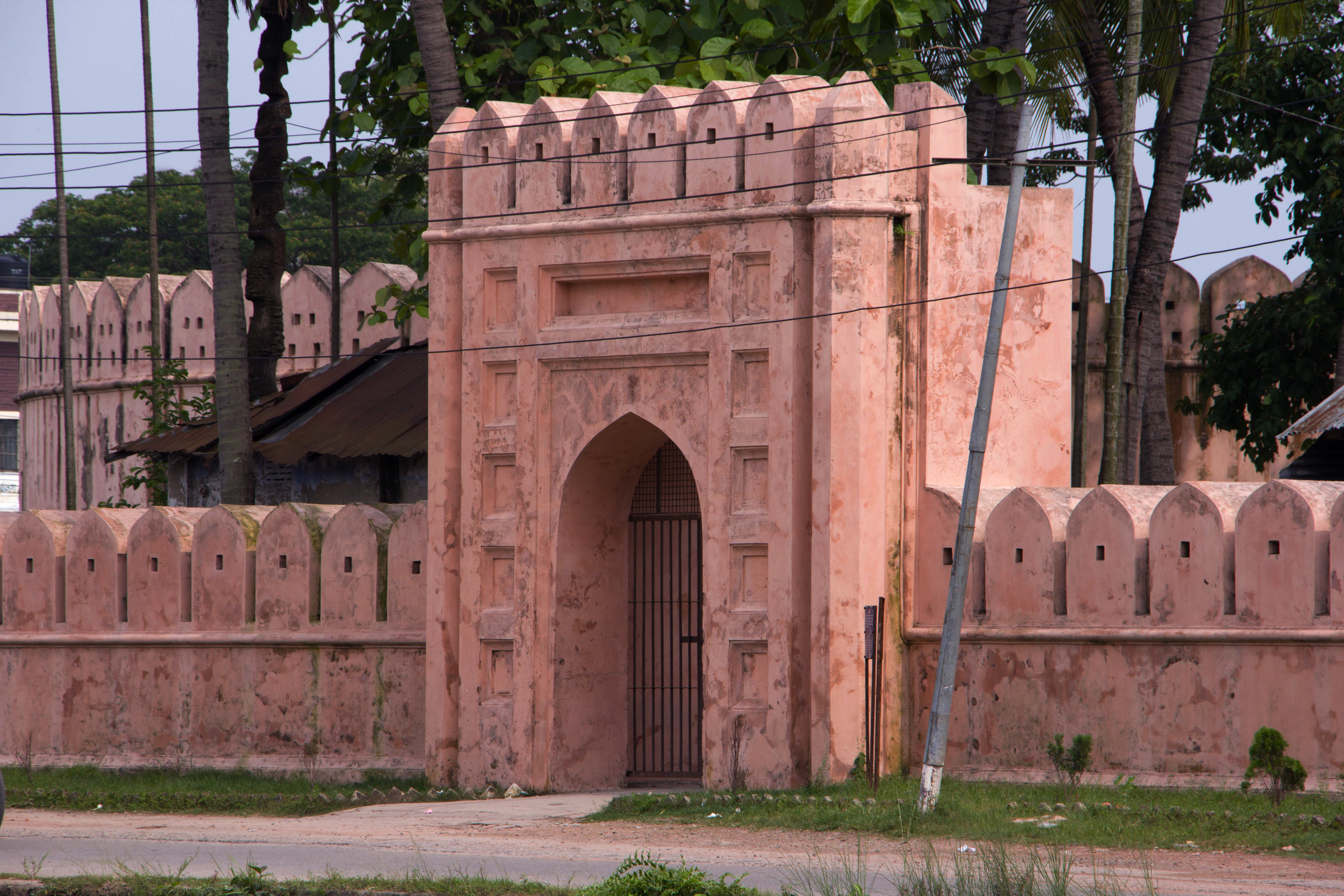

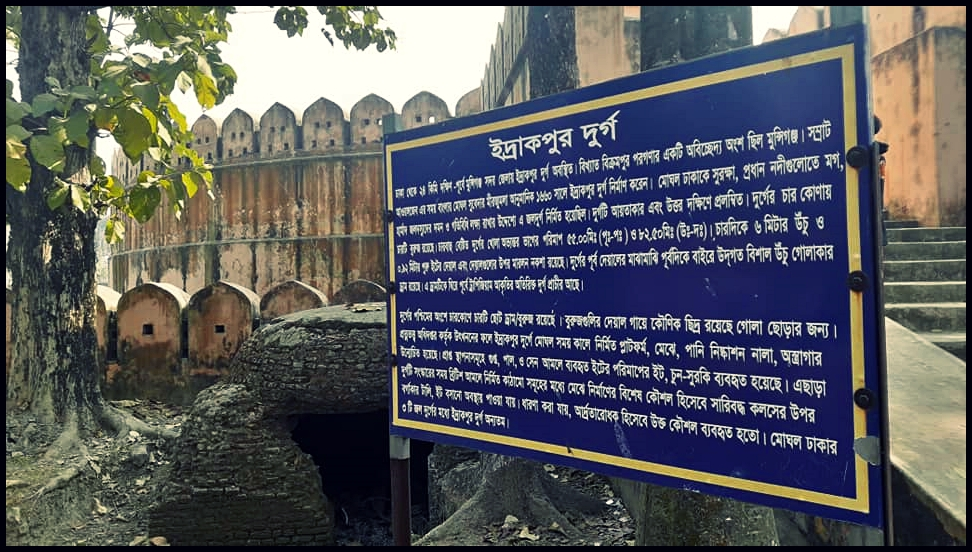

== See also ==
- Sonakanda Fort
- Hajiganj Fort
- Lalbagh Fort
- List of archaeological sites in Bangladesh
