= Morgan Girls High School =

Morgan Girls High School, Narayanganj
- মর্গ্যান বালিকা উচ্চ বিদ্যালয়, নারায়ণগঞ্জ

Location
- Bhasha Sainik Mamataj Begum Road; D.I.T., Narayanganj; Narayanganj, 1400; Bangladesh
- Coordinates: 23°37′00″N 90°30′00″E

Information
- Established: 1910; 116 years ago
- Founder: G. Morgan
- Staff: 70
- Faculty: 55 (full-time), 12 (part-time)
- Grades: 3–10
- Gender: Girls
- Age: 8 to 16
- Enrollment: ~2,500
- Language: Bengali
- Campus size: 5 acres (2.0 ha)
- Campus type: Urban
- Sports: Table tennis, badminton, volleyball, basketball
- Website: mgscn.edu.bd

Morgan Girls High School (Bengali: মর্গ্যান বালিকা উচ্চ বিদ্যালয়), commonly known as MGHS, is a secondary school for girls located in D.I.T., Narayanganj, Bangladesh. Established in 1910, it is one of the oldest educational institutions in the region. The school provides education from grade 3 through grade 10 and is recognized as one of the prominent girls' schools in the Narayanganj District.

The institution has been noted for its academic consistency in the Secondary School Certificate (SSC) examinations and has produced alumni who have gone on to become notable professionals in various fields, including science, politics, and the military.

== History ==
Entrance of Morgan Girls High School, Narayanganj

The school was founded in 1910 by G. Morgan, the then-chairman of Narayanganj Municipality. At its inception, it was one of the few schools dedicated to girls' education in the greater Dhaka region. The construction of the original schoolhouse was funded by the municipality.

The campus covers approximately 5 acres (2.0 ha) and is situated beside Bhasha Sainik Mamataj Begum Road, near the Ali Ahmed Municipality Library. Following the Bangladesh Government Public Schools Act of 1968, the school has been modelled after public institutions and is supported by government grants and student fees. A board of governors oversees its administrative rules and functions.

=== Language Movement connection ===
Mumtaz Begum, a prominent activist, served as the school's headmistress starting in 1951. She played a significant role in the Bengali Language Movement, leading students in protests to demand the recognition of Bengali as a state language. Her involvement led to her arrest in February 1952 on charges of embezzlement—a move widely seen as a pretext to suppress political dissent. She remained imprisoned until May 1953. In recognition of her contribution, she was posthumously awarded the Ekushey Padak in 2012.

=== 2018 demolition controversy ===
In May 2018, a significant controversy arose when the Narayanganj City Corporation (NCC) demolished the school's kitchen building. The demolition was carried out to facilitate the construction of a parking lot for the nearby Ali Ahmed Chunka Library. The move sparked protests from hundreds of students, teachers, and parents who took to the streets. The demolition was reportedly directed by NCC Mayor Selina Hayat Ivy, whose father is the namesake of the library.

== Campus ==
The school is located in north-west Narayanganj, opposite the D.I.T. Super Market. The campus infrastructure comprises four main structures: a main building, an administrative building, and two academic buildings. Academic Building 1, located on the north-east side of the campus, serves students in grades 9–10, while Academic Building 2 in the south-east corner serves grades 3–8.

The grounds also feature staff quarters, an auditorium, and a full-size football pitch. A monument stands in front of Academic Building 1, dedicated to the martyrs of the 1952 Language Movement.

== Academics ==
Morgan Girls High School operates on a double-shift schedule to accommodate its student body. The academic curriculum follows the national standard set by the Ministry of Education. At the primary level (grades 3–5), core subjects include Bengali, Mathematics, English, Bangladesh and Global Studies, General Science, and Religion. At the secondary level (grades 6–10), students choose a specialized stream—Science, Arts, or Commerce—prior to ninth grade.

The school maintains a student–teacher ratio of approximately 40:1. Facilities include laboratories for physics, chemistry, biology, and computer science, as well as a library containing over 2,000 volumes.

=== Admission ===
Admission is competitive and primarily takes place in grades 3, 6, and 9. Prospective students are required to pass a written admission test, followed by a viva voce for final selection.

== Extracurricular activities ==
The school encourages participation in various extracurricular activities. The debating club represents the school in regional and national competitions, and a unit of the Girl Guides movement is active on campus. Popular sports include volleyball, basketball, table tennis, and chess; the school team secured the Inter-School Girls Basketball Championship in 2000. Students also regularly participate in Mathematics, Science, and Astronomy Olympiads. An annual magazine, X, features contributions from students and staff.

== Notable alumni ==
- Selina Hayat Ivy, the first mayor of Narayanganj City Corporation.
