= Siddique Dewan =

Bangladeshi footballer (1897–1980s)

Siddique Dewan KPM
Personal information
- Full name: Mohammed Siddique Dewan
- Date of birth: 1897
- Place of birth: Narayanganj, Bengal, British India
- Date of death: c. 1990
- Place of death: Bangladesh
- Position: Center-half

Senior career*
Years	Team	Apps	(Gls)
1916–1918	Town Club		
1918–1928	Wari Club		
- * Club domestic league appearances and goals

Mohammed Siddique Dewan KPM IP (Bengali: মোহাম্মদ সিদ্দিক দেওয়ান; 1897 – c. 1990) was a footballer and police officer from the Bengal Presidency in British India. A centre-half, he is best known for his long association with Wari Club of Dhaka, for whom he played for nearly a decade. He also served as a Sub-inspector in the Dhaka Police Force of the Indian Imperial Police in Bengal, and was awarded the King's Police Medal (KPM) in 1930.

== Early life ==
Dewan was born in Baidyer Bazar Union of Narayanganj District, Bengal, British India in 1897. He attended Sonakanda High School in Narayanganj, and represented the school football team.

== Football career ==
In 1916, Dewan began playing for Town Club, Narayanganj, and caught the attention of S. N. Roy, who was then the captain of Wari Club. In 1918, Dewan joined the Dhaka-based club, where he went on to spend the rest of his career, representing the team as a centre-half in a 2–3–5 formation for almost a decade.

He represented Wari Club in the IFA Shield in West Bengal from 1921 until his retirement. In 1922, he toured the United Kingdom with the club, taking part in several exhibition matches. Dewan also featured for Wari in the Cooch Behar Cup and the Ronaldshay Shield. In 1927, he was a member of the Wari side that was eliminated from the IFA Shield by the defending champions, Sherwood Foresters. Although the British regimental team secured a narrow 2–1 victory, Wari were widely regarded as the better side, with Dewan playing alongside notable teammates such as S. Chakraborty, M. Das Gupta, Tejas Shome and R. Bose.

On 14 August 1965, he played for Ashraful Huq XI against Samad XI in a veterans exhibition match organized by the East Pakistan Sports Federation on Pakistan's Independence Day.

== Police career ==
In 1925, Dewan joined the Dacca Police as a Sub-inspector under the Indian Imperial Police. In 1930, when the British first introduced a football league in crime-ridden Chittagong, Dewan, serving with the provincial police, was assigned responsibility for managing ground security during the championship final. Following the conclusion of the match, Inspector Khan Bahadur Assanullah was fatally shot. Dewan pursued the perpetrator unarmed and successfully apprehended him. For his actions, Dewan was awarded the King's Police Medal (KPM) for gallantry. He was also granted a monthly allowance of Rs. 15, which continued for two generations. He retired from the police force in 1957.

== Sports administration ==
In November 1937, Dewan was elected general secretary of the Corinthians–Chittagong Football Committee, which was formed to administer an exhibition match in Chittagong between the touring British club Islington Corinthians and a Chittagong XI. The match was played on 26 November 1937 and ended in a 1–0 victory for the visitors. He was also involved in the administration of Chittagong Town Club. Dewan later collaborated with the East Pakistan Sports Federation. In 1958, he served as the manager of the East Pakistan football team during the National Football Championship held in Multan. In 1964, he was appointed team leader of the Dacca Division squad at the East Zone Championship in Khulna. Additionally, he served as the general secretary of Wari Club from 1952 to 1956 and returned as its vice-president in 1976.

== Death ==
He died in the 1980s.
