= Mayor of Narayanganj =

- Incumbent; Sakhawat Hossain Khan since 23 February 2026
- Narayanganj City Corporation
- Style: Honourable (formal)
- Type: Council Leader
- Member of: Narayanganj City Corporation
- Seat: Nagar Bhaban, Narayanganj
- Appointer: Electorate of Narayanganj
- Term length: Five years, renewable
- Constituting instrument: The City Corporation act, 2009
- Inaugural holder: Dr. Selina Hayat Ivy
- Salary: ৳150000 (US$1,200) per month (incl. allowances)
- Website: Narayanganj City Corporation

The Mayor of Narayanganj is the chief elected executive of the Narayanganj City Corporation. The Mayor’s office oversees civic services, manages public properties, and coordinates the functions of various government agencies within the city. In addition, the Mayor is responsible for enforcing city corporation regulations and state laws, thereby ensuring good governance and the sustainable development of Narayanganj.

The Mayor's office is located in Nagar Bhaban; it has jurisdiction over all 27 wards of Narayanganj City.

== List of officeholders ==
Political parties

- Bangladesh Awami League
- Bangladesh Nationalist Party

Other factions

- Independent

Status

- Acting Mayor and Administrator

| No. | Portrait | Officeholder (birth–death) | Election | Term of office | | | Designation | Political party | Reference |
| No. | Portrait | Officeholder (birth–death) | Election | From | To | Period | Designation | Political party | Reference |
|---|---|---|---|---|---|---|---|---|---|
| 1 | | Dr. Selina Hayat Ivy | 2011; 2016; 2022 | 5 May 2011 | 19 August 2024 | 13 years, 106 days | Mayor | Bangladesh Awami League | |
| – | | A. H. M. Kamruzzaman | – | 19 August 2024 | 22 February 2026 | 1 year, 188 days | Administrator | Independent | |
| – | | Sakhawat Hossain Khan | – | 23 February 2026 | Incumbent | 229 days | Administrator | Bangladesh Nationalist Party | |

== Elections ==
=== Election results 2022 ===
Narayanganj Mayoral Election 2022
| Party | Candidate | Votes | % | ±% |
|---|---|---|---|---|
| AL | Dr. Selina Hayat Ivy | 159,057 | 54.66 | −9.44 |
| Independent | Taimur Alam Khandaker | 92,562 | 31.80 | +31.80 |
| IAB | Machum Billah | 23,987 | 8.24 | +8.24 |
| Khelafat Majlis | ABM Shirzul Mamun | 10,782 | 3.70 | +3.70 |
| Majority | | 66,495 | 22.86 | −6.49 |
| Turnout | | 290,991 | 56.23 | +0.21 |
| Registered electors | | 517,351 | | |
| AL hold | | | | |

=== Election results 2016 ===
Narayanganj Mayoral Election 2016
| Party | Candidate | Votes | % | ±% |
|---|---|---|---|---|
| AL | Dr. Selina Hayat Ivy | 175,611 | 64.10 | +8.64 |
| BNP | Sakhawat Hossain Khan | 96,044 | 35.06 | +27.24 |
| Majority | | 79,567 | 29.04 | −6.83 |
| Turnout | | 271,655 | 56.02 | −5.01 |
| Registered electors | | 484,931 | | |
| AL gain from Independent | | | | |

=== Election results 2011 ===
Narayanganj Mayoral Election 2011
| Party | Candidate | Votes | % | ±% |
|---|---|---|---|---|
| Independent | Dr. Selina Hayat Ivy | 180,048 | 63.03 | New |
| AL | Shamim Osman | 78,705 | 27.57 | New |
| BNP | Taimur Alam Khandaker | 7,616 | 2.67 | New |
| Majority | | 101,343 | 35.46 | New |
| Turnout | | 282,593 | 61.03 | New |
| Registered electors | | 463,050 | | |
| Independent win (new seat) | | | | |
