= Sonakanda Fort =

River fort in Narayanganj, Bangladesh

- সোনাকান্দা দুর্গ
- Narayanganj, Bangladesh
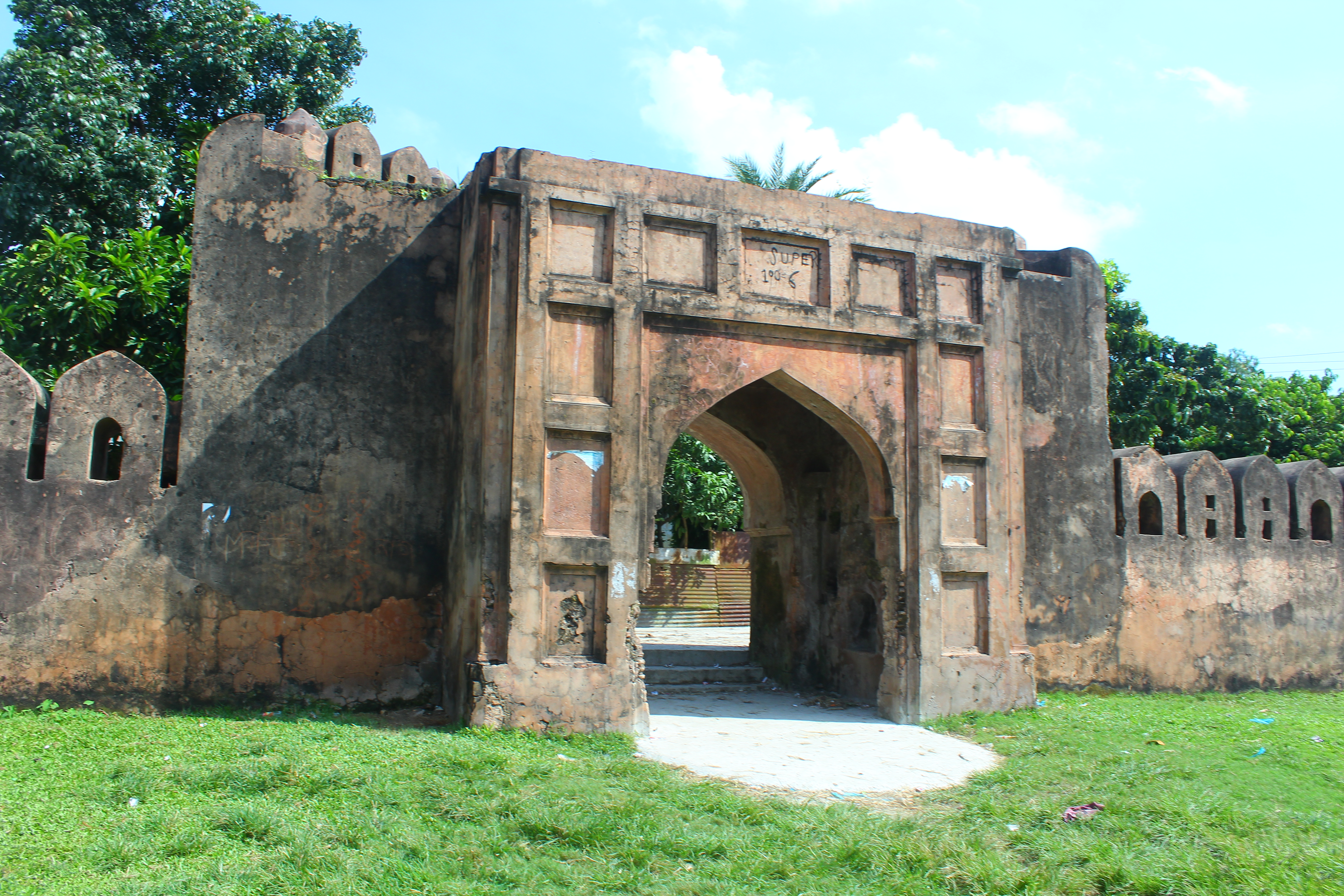
- Entrance to Sonakanda Fort

Site information
- Controlled by: Department of Archaeology, Dhaka Division
- Open to the public: Yes

Location
- Coordinates: 23.6070°N 90.5120°E

Site history
- Built: Mid-17th century
- Built by: Mir Jumla II

Sonakanda Fort (Bengali: সোনাকান্দা দুর্গ) is a river Redoubt fortification situated in Narayanganj, Bangladesh, on the eastern bank of Shitalakshya River. Though the time of its establishment could not be ascertained, historians believe that the river fort was built by Mir Jumla II, a Subahdar of Bengal under the Mughal Empire, to defend Dhaka and Narayanganj from pirates.

== History ==
Bengal went under the effective control of the Mughal Empire in 1574 AD after the defeat of Daud Khan Karrani by the Mughal General Munim Khan. Mughals exercised a progressive rule in Bengal and were determined to protect their subjects from external forces.

Mir Jumla II was appointed as the Subahdar or governor of the then Bengal province in 1660 AD. He was aware of the pirates who ran a campaign of terror in the important cities of Bengal. In a quest to protect the capital Dhaka from the pirates, Mir Jumla II decided to build three river forts around Dhaka, including Sonakanda Fort.

Though archaeologists cannot trace any evidence on its date of establishment, according to historians the construction of the fort started between 1660 and 1663 AD.

== Architecture ==
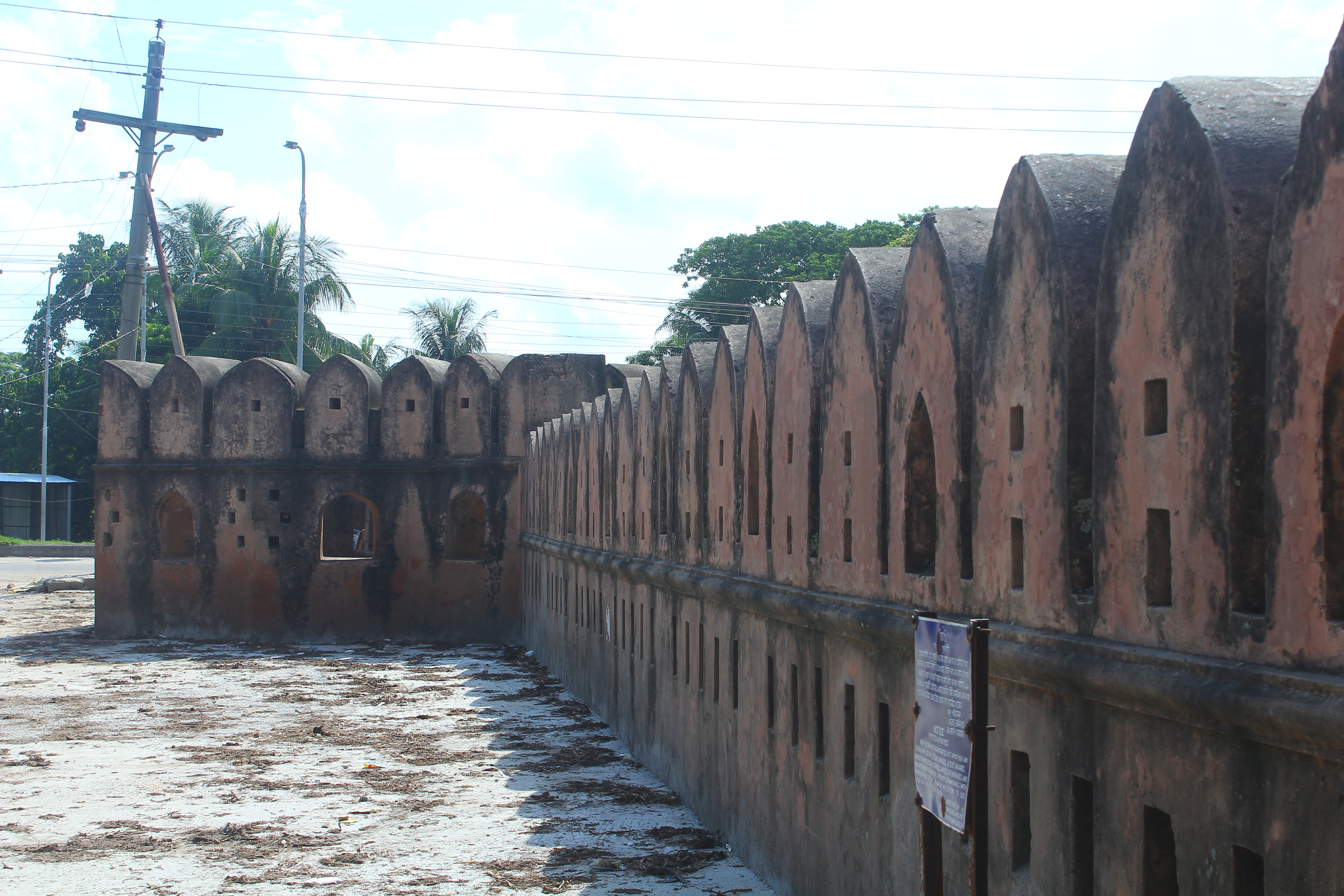
The square holes on the fort's wall were likely used by artillery

The fort is structured as riverine redoubt fortifications system which combines thick walls, a massive artillery platform and a gateway to the north. The fort has two main parts. One is a fortified defensive wall of gigantic dimensions. The defensive walls are 3.05 m (10.0 ft) in height and thicker at the bottom. Several wide and narrow loopholes allowed guns and light cannons to fire shells at the pirates. The other one is a raised outwork on the western face to defend the fort from the attack of the pirates. The most significant structure of the fort is the massive artillery platform. One of the spherical artillery platforms has a stairway, which leads up to the artillery platform. Cannons with bigger calibre were placed on there, aiming at the aggressors coming up the Shitalakshya River and to protect soldiers outside the main defensive line. This is a unique feature of the river forts built by Mughal Empire.

The platform is surrounded by two circular structures of which the diameter of the inner one is 15.70 metres and the diameter of the outer one is 19.35 metres. The structure is 6.09 metres in height and surrounded by walls. The fort is quadrangular in plan, measuring 86.56 by 57 m (284.0 by 187.0 ft). There are octagonal bastions on the four corners of the fort. The corner bastions on both sides of the western wing are wider than those of the eastern wing, which are 4.26 metres, while the two on the western wing are 6.85 metres in width.

The only gate of the fort is on the north. The arched entrance is placed within a rectangular frame. The gateway is higher than the average height of the walls of fort and decorated with several groomed panels.

== Myths ==
There are a number of anachronistic myths related to the river fort that include tragedy and mystery.

- Princess Swarnamoyee, daughter of Kedar Roy, ruler of Bikrampur, went to the Shitalakshya River to perform sacred bath. Her barge was attacked by pirates, and the princess was kidnapped. She was later saved by Isa Khan Niazi, the ruler of Sonargaon. Isa Khan brought her to the Sonakanda Fort and asked her father to take her back. Kedar Roy, however, refused to take her back as she had lost her caste by spending a night in a tent owned by a Muslim ruler. Swarnamoyee, shocked by the incident, cried for several days in her tent at Sonakanda Fort. It is said that name of the fort is derived from this incident-- Sona or gold being a reference to the name Swarnamoyee and kanda being the Bengali word for crying.
- Another version of the story says that Isa Khan forcefully married Sona Bibi, a widowed daughter of Kedar Roy. She was brought to this fort and put under confinement by Isa Khan's soldiers. She cried following the incident and the name of the fort derived from that.
- Some people believe that there were some hidden tunnels in the fort that linked it with Sonargaon and Lalbagh Fort.

== Gallery ==
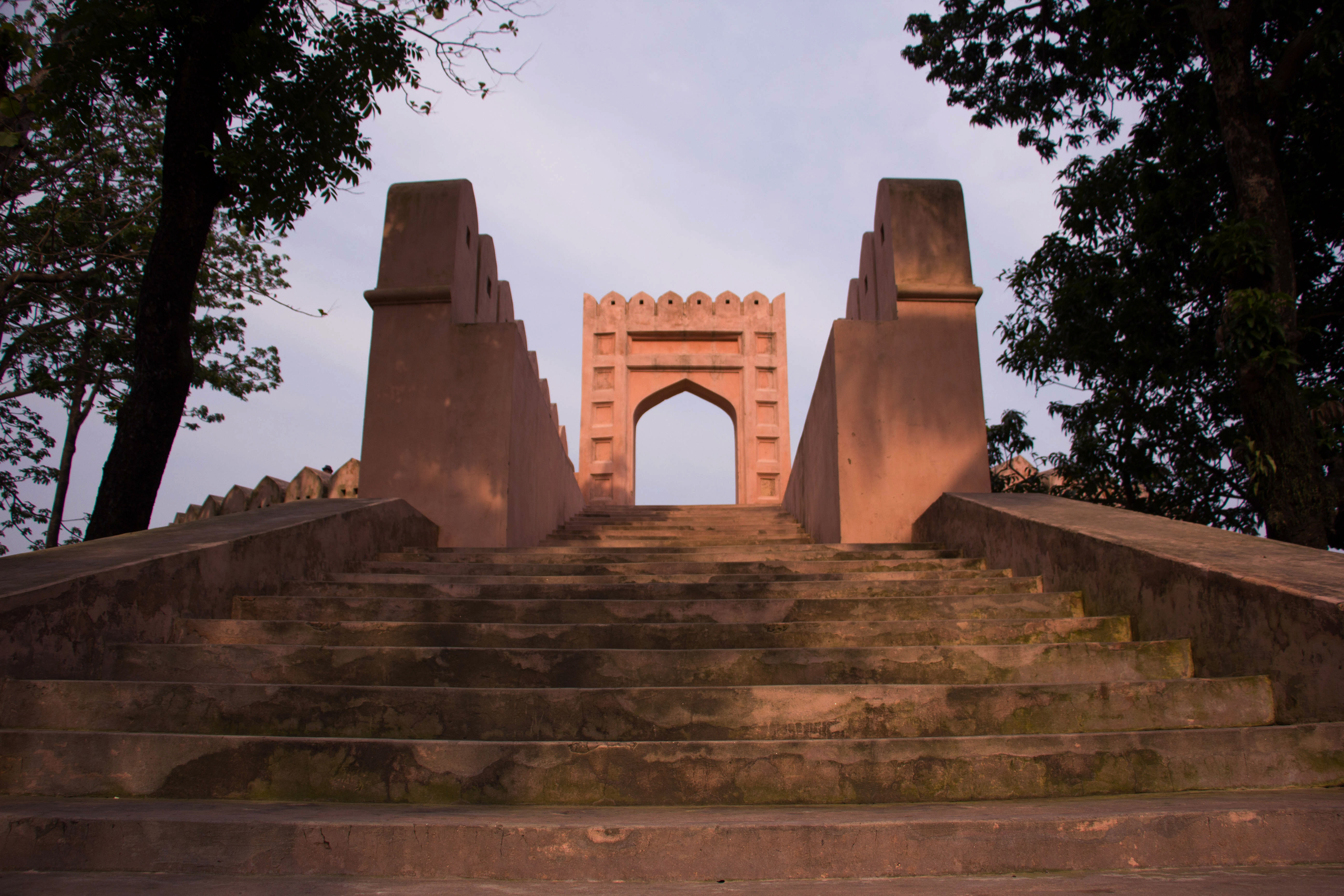

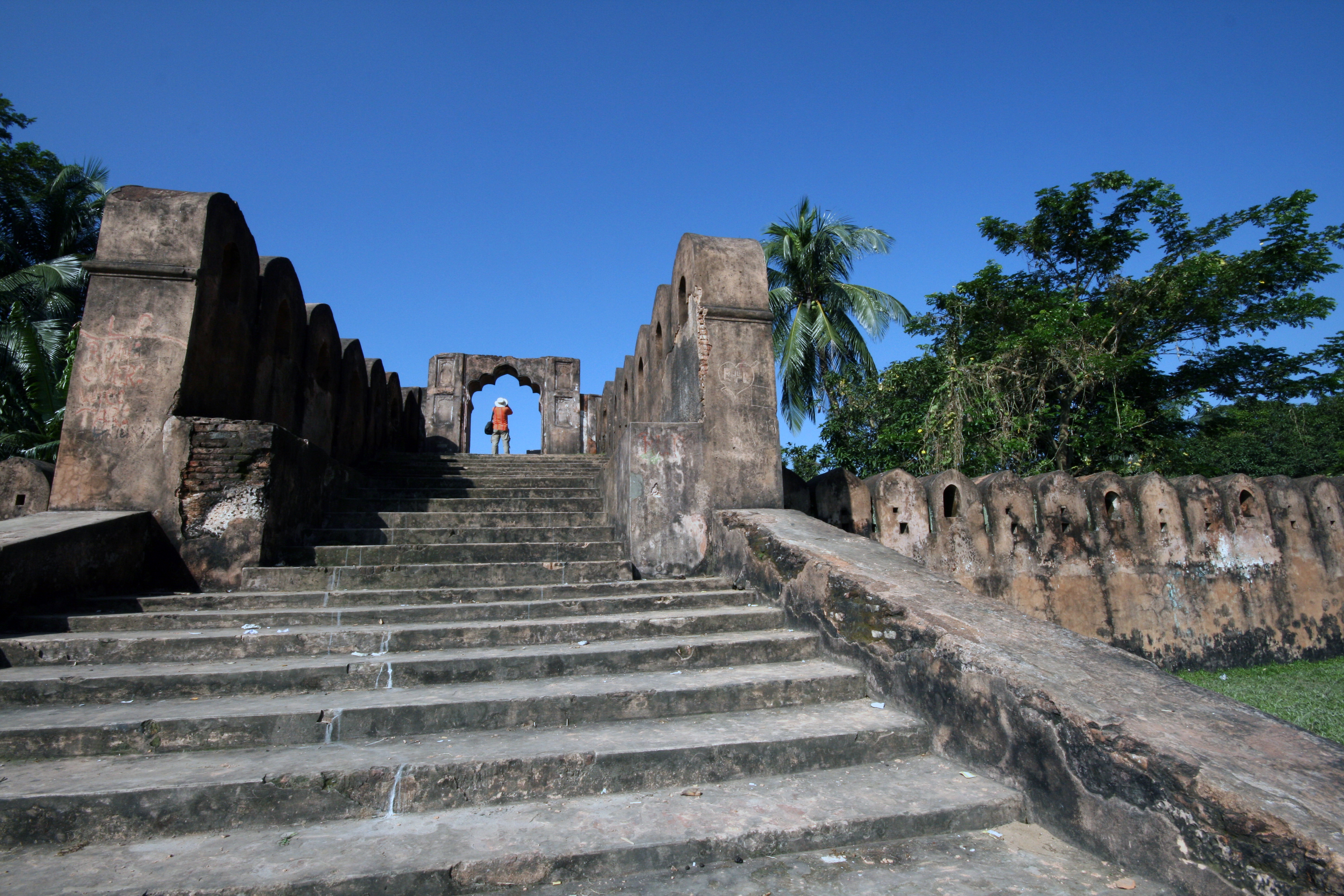

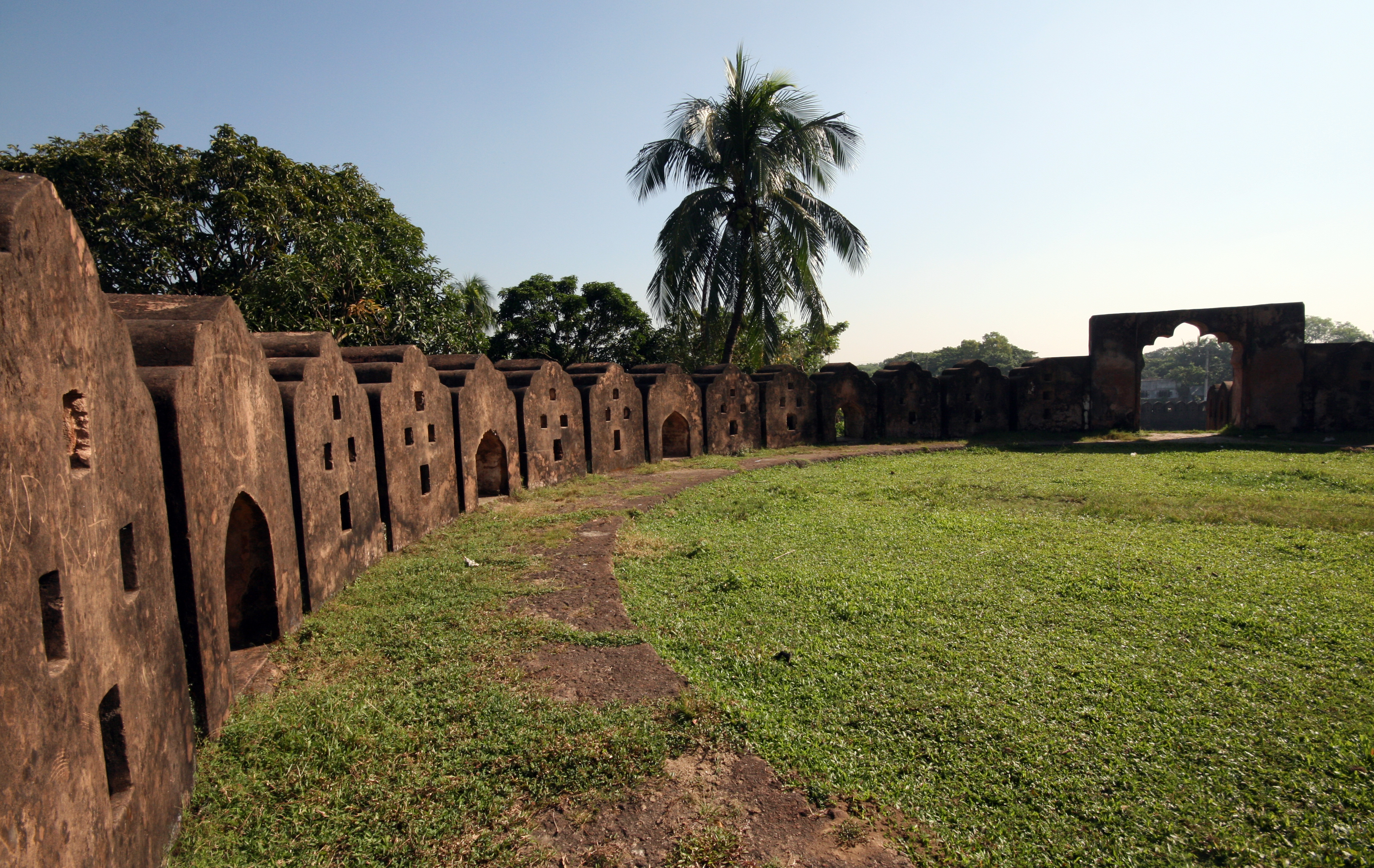

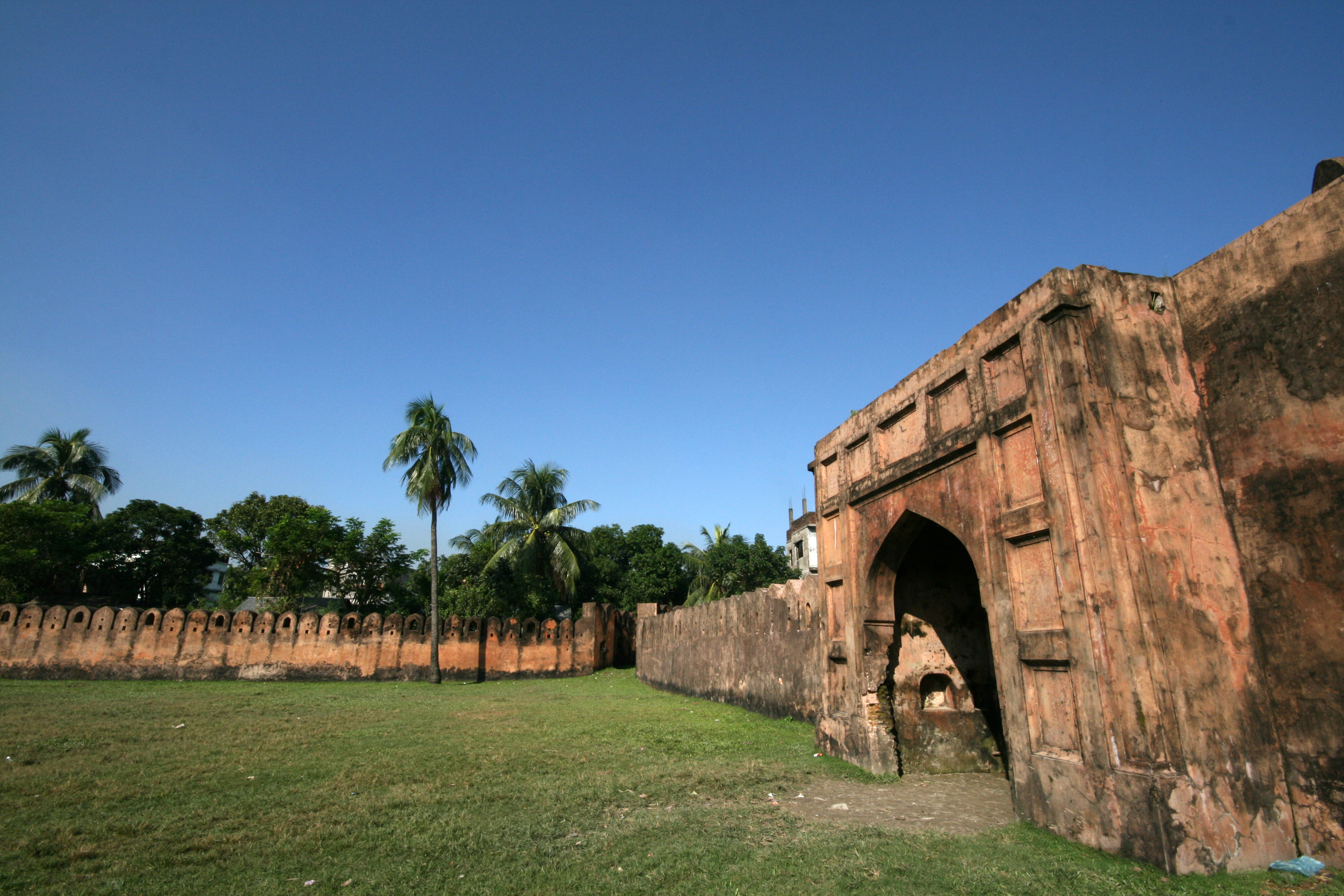

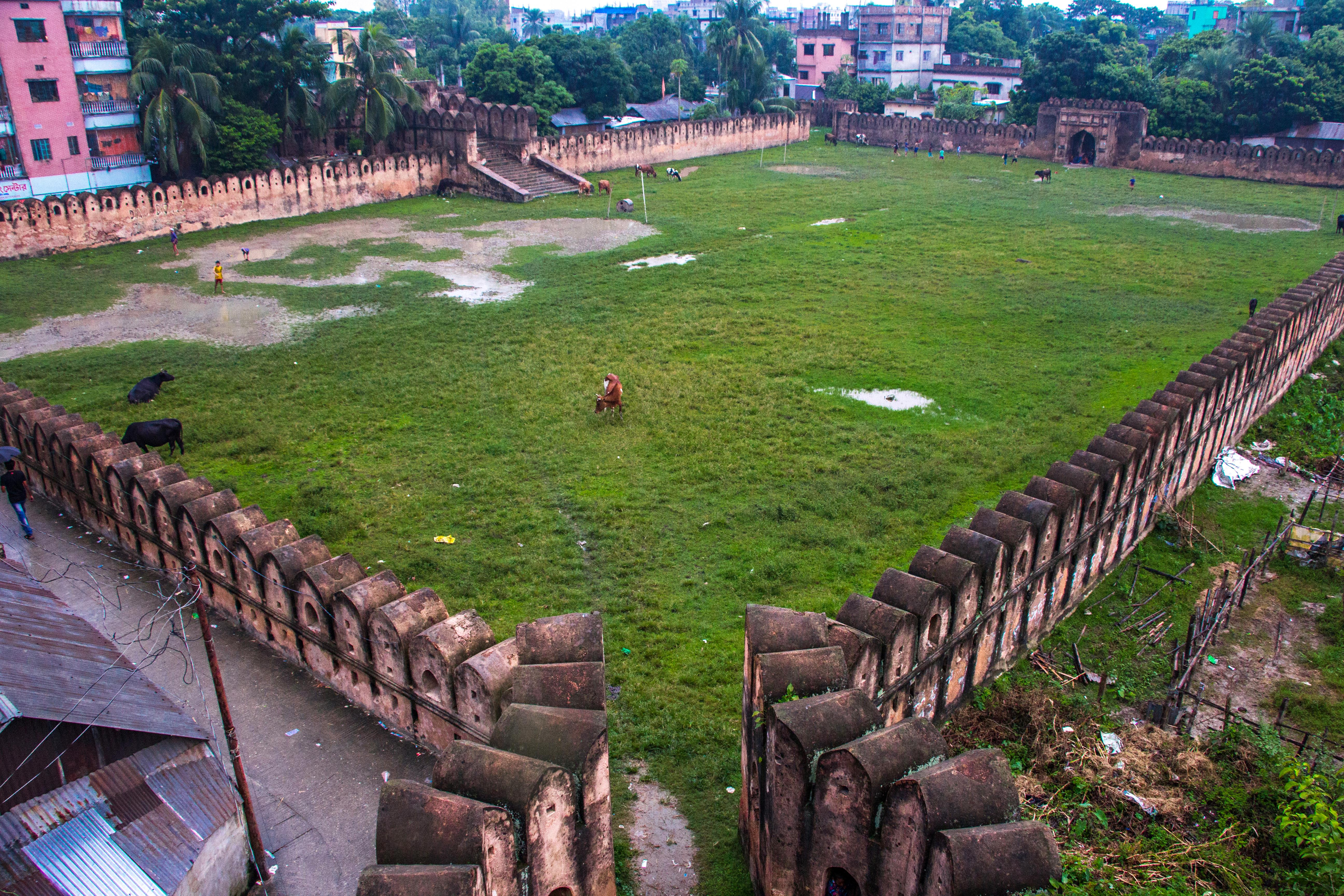

== See also ==
- Hajiganj Fort
- Idrakpur Fort
- List of archaeological sites in Bangladesh
