= Taimur Alam Khandaker =

Bangladeshi politician

Taimur Alam Khandaker is a Bangladeshi politician in Trinomool BNP. He is the former chairman of the Bangladesh Road Transport Corporation.

== Career ==
From 2001 to 2006, Khandaker was the chairman of Bangladesh Road Transport Corporation.

In October 2007, the Anti-corruption Commission identified Khandaker, former chairman of Bangladesh Road Transport Corporation, as a corruption suspect. Mohammad Hanif, general secretary of the Dhaka Auto Rickshaw Shramik Union, sued Khandaker and Barrister Nazmul Huda, former minister of communication, on charges of misappropriating 10 million BDT from the union. The Bangladesh High Court cancelled a letter by the Anti-corruption Commission asking Khandaker to submit a wealth statement. The Bangladesh Supreme Court cancelled the High Court order in March 2008. In June, he was sentenced to 14 years imprisonment on charges of taking a bribe from Nikunja Model Service Centre. The Anti-corruption Commission sued him on charges of illegal wealth in November 2008. His wife, Nasima Haque, and son, Mashfiqul Haque, were also in the charge sheet. He had 11 criminal cases against him. He collected nomination forms from the Bangladesh Nationalist Party. In 2009, he was elected president of the Narayanganj District unit of the Bangladesh Nationalist Party.

Khandaker contested the 2011 Narayanganj City Corporation election backed by the Bangladesh Nationalist Party but withdrew at the last moment alleging the vote was rigged in favor of the ruling Awami League.

In September 2014, Khandaker was arrested in Dhaka on a vandalism case filed by Sayed Ruhul Arefin. He was the president of the Narayanganj District unit of the Bangladesh Nationalist Party and chairman of Bangladesh Jatiya Badhir Sangsthya. In December 2016, he contested the Narayanganj City Corporation election as a Bangladesh Nationalist Party candidate.

Khandaker contested the Narayanganj City Corporation election as an independent candidate in January 2022. He lost but blamed the government for rigging the election. He alleged his polling agents were not allowed in the polling centers. He was the advisor of Bangladesh Nationalist Party chairperson Khaleda Zia. He was expelled from the Bangladesh Nationalist Party for participating in the election against the party decision. He said he would continue to work for the Bangladesh Nationalist Party. He was also removed from the post of advisor to the party chairperson.

In September 2023, Khandaker was elected general secretary of the Trinamool BNP. He collected the nomination form for Narayanganj-1 for the 12th parliamentary elections in November 2023. He lost to Awami League candidate Golam Dastagir Gazi. After the elections, he warned Bangladesh was at the risk of becoming a one party state.

== Personal life ==
Khandaker's brother, Sabbir Alam Khandaker, was murdered in 2003.
