= Asrafia Jame Mosque =

Mosque in Narayanganj, Bangladesh

Asrafia Jame Masjid
- আশরাফিয়া জামে মাসজিদ
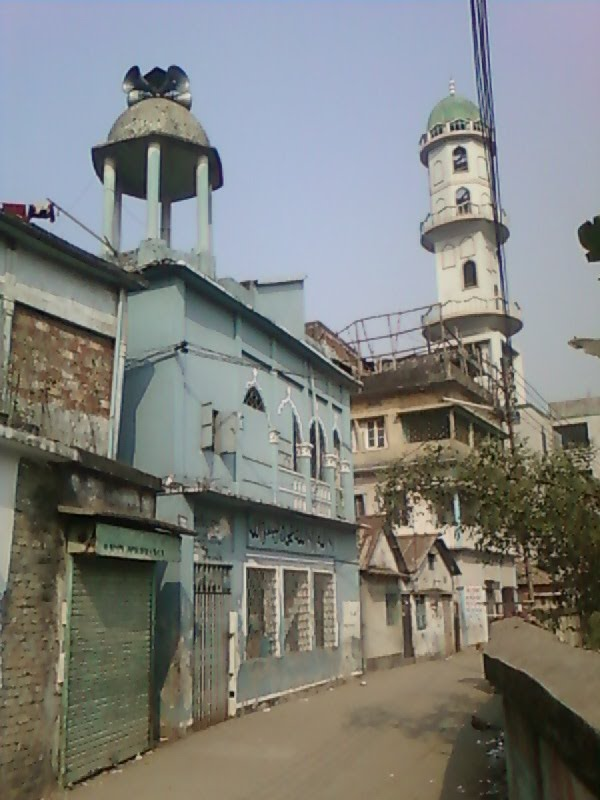
- A front view of the mosque, painted blue

- Location of the mosque in Bangladesh

Religion
- Affiliation: Sunni Islam
- Sect: Hanafi
- Ecclesiastical or organisational status: Friday mosque
- Status: Active

Location
- Location: 10 K B Shaha By Lane, Amlapara, Narayanganj, Dhaka Division
- Country: Bangladesh
- Coordinates: 23°37′20″N 90°30′13″E

Architecture
- Style: Mughal
- Founder: Rahim Bakhsh Haji, Ahladi Bibi
- Completed: 1890

Specifications
- Dome: One
- Minaret: One

Asrafia Jame Masjid (Bengali: আশরাফিয়া জামে মাসজিদ, Arabic: جامع الأشرفية), previously known as the Mosque of Ahladi Bibi, is a Hanafi Sunni Friday mosque, located in the urban neighbourhood of Amlapara, in the city of Narayanganj, in the Dhaka Division of Bangladesh. It was built during the British Raj colonial period, dating from the 1890s CE.

== History ==
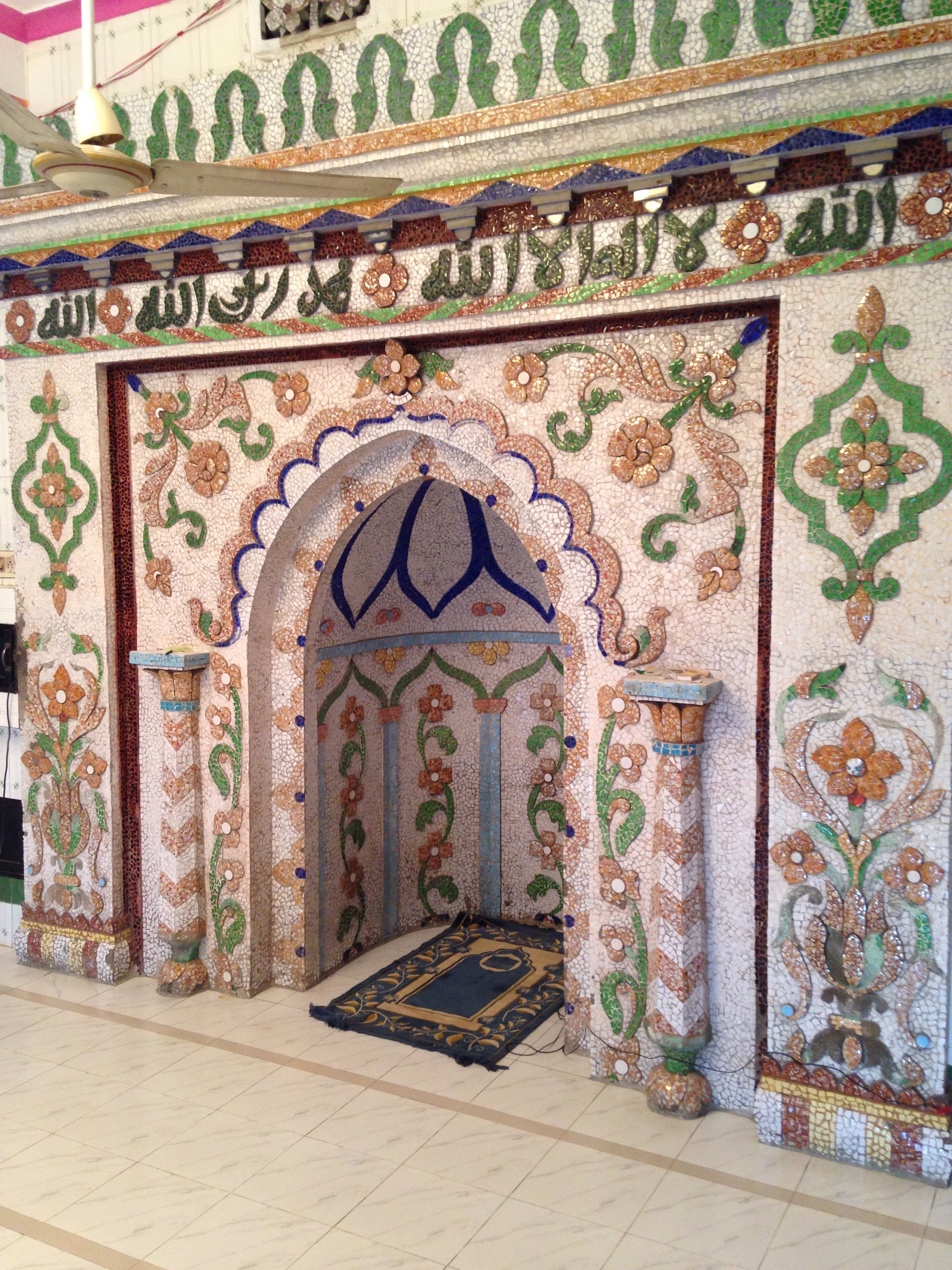
A mihrab on the western wall.

The Asrafia Jame Masjid is one of the oldest mosques in the Narayanganj District. On 20 April 1898, a Bengali Muslim zamindar by the name of Rahim Bakhsh Haji (1857-1935) and his wife talukdar Ahladi Bibi officially purchased Zamindari Portion from Harendra Kumar Roy Chowdhury, the Zamindar of Baliati. Later, Haji and his wife decided to donate a portion of land in Amlapara to serve as a charitable endowment and a place of worship. The mosque was named after the wife as "Ahladi Bibir Masjid". Over time, the name changed to Asrafia Jame Masjid. The mosque has been found recorded in the British map (C S Parcha).

After renovations in 2002, the mosque lost much of its past heritage, architectural style and decorative style. At present, there is nothing remaining from the original mosque except the dome, mihrab and minaret.

== Architectural elements and style ==
Although the mosque was constructed in the colonial period, the structure followed the style of Mughal architecture. It was built as an extremely tall single-storied mosque with great emphasis on the vertical qualities. There are small four domes in the four sides of the roof. A mihrab is located in the western wall, stood from the base of the ground floor to one-third of the height of the first floor. It contains the Shahada written in Arabic calligraphy with glass and stone-flowing Mughal styles. The mihrab's design is made of pieces of glass and stones of five colours; blue, green, yellow (light matte), brown and white. The architecture of the mosque is defined by a combination of embellishments and proportional adjustment among elements such as arches, domes, mihrab etc.

== See also ==
- Islam in Bangladesh
- List of mosques in Bangladesh
