= Hajiganj Fort =

Mughal fort in Narayanganj, Bangladesh

- হাজিগঞ্জ দুর্গ
- Narayanganj, Bangladesh
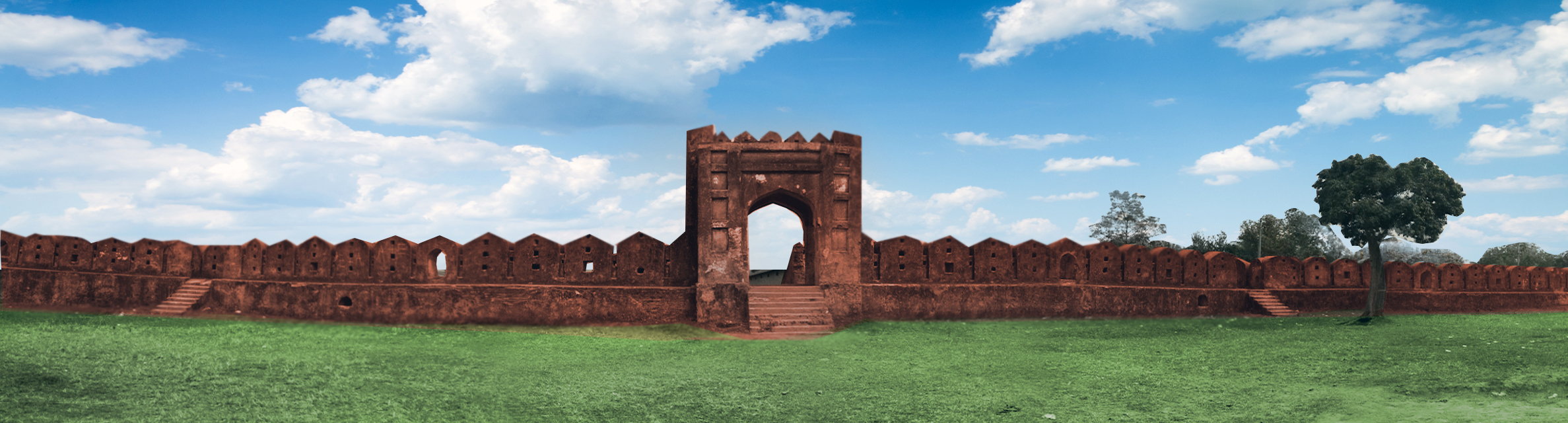
- Panoramic view of Hajiganj Fort in daylight

Site information
- Controlled by: Department of Archaeology, Dhaka Division
- Open to the public: Yes

Location
- Coordinates: 23.6334°N 90.5128°E

Site history
- Built: 1610/1650
- Built by: Mir Jumla I or Islam Khan I
- Materials: Burnt brick, plaster

Hajiganj Fort (Bengali: হাজীগঞ্জ দুর্গ) also known as Khizirpur Fort (Bengali: খিজিরপুর দুর্গ) is a historical Mughal fort situated at Hajiganj locality of Narayanganj, Bangladesh, on the western bank of Shitalakshya.

== History ==
The exact date of Hajiganj fort is uncertain but it may have been built soon after Subahdar Islam Khan established the Mughal capital at Dhaka. It was built to prevent Magh and Portuguese raids on Dhaka. It is a notable example of river-forts built by the Mughal Empire around the area of Dhaka, and predates the construction of other examples such as Sonakanda Fort and Idrakpur Fort. These three forts together formed a defence system for Dhaka. The historical name of the fort and its surrounding area was Khizirpur. The fort was used considerably by Islam Khan in assaults against the Baro-Bhuiyans.

== Architecture ==
The fort is built of burnt brick and plaster. The historic riverine fortification is characterized by its quadrangular layout and pentagonal curtain wall. The fort's design includes rounded corner bastions and a machicolated parapet equipped for musket fire. The curtain wall, pierced with musketry holes, supports a rampart walkway elevated 1.22 meters from the base, providing a defensive platform. Each corner bastion contains an internal staircase leading to the rampart level, where merlons feature wider openings designed for cannon fire. A distinctive feature of the fort is a freestanding, tall square brick column in one corner of the quadrangle, likely serving as a guard tower. This architectural element suggests connections to contemporaneous water forts in the region.

The fort’s sole gateway is positioned on the river-facing side. The pentagonal gateway is set within a rectangular structure adorned with engraved rectangular arches on both sides and crowned by a lotus finial. The absence of permanent structures within the fort’s interior suggests it was primarily occupied during the rainy season, when pirate activity was anticipated, with occupants likely using tents for shelter.

== Gallery ==
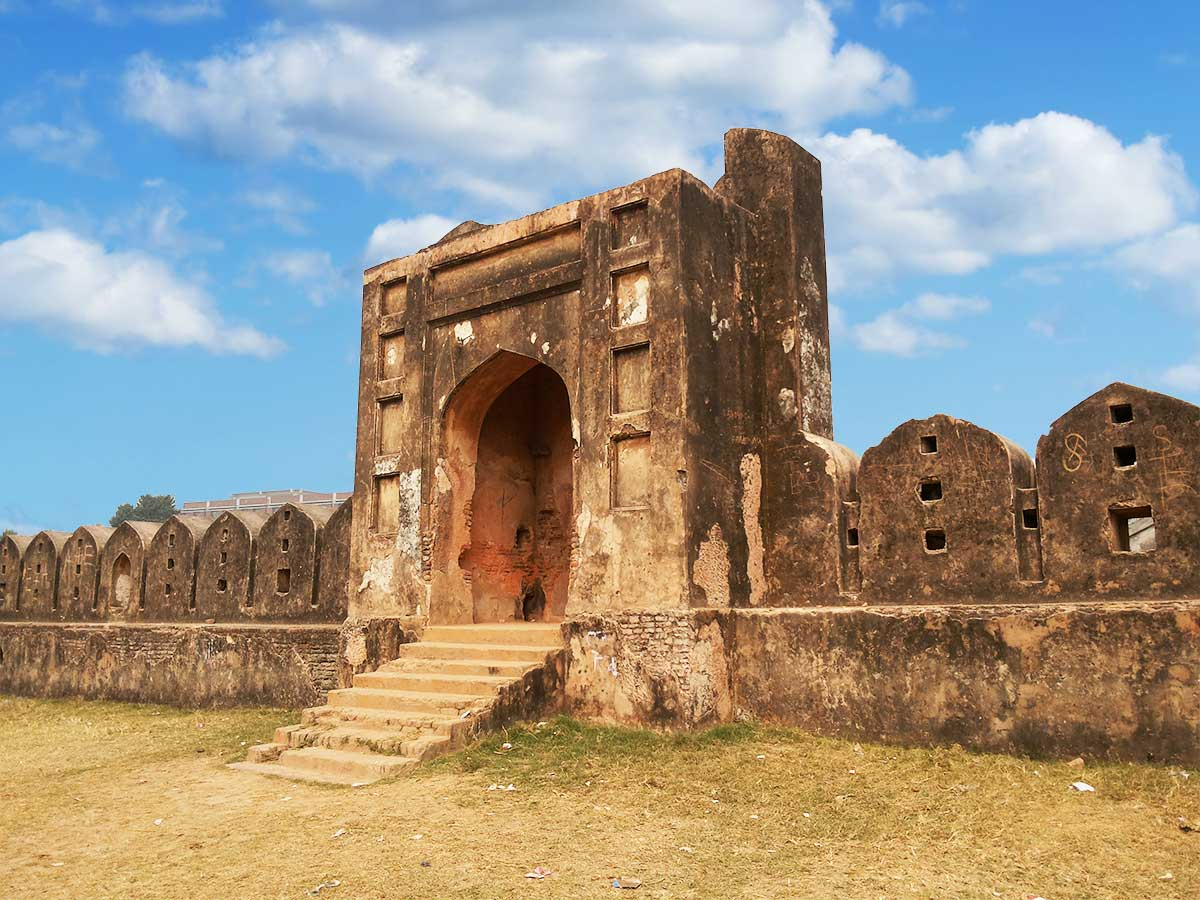
Gate of the fort

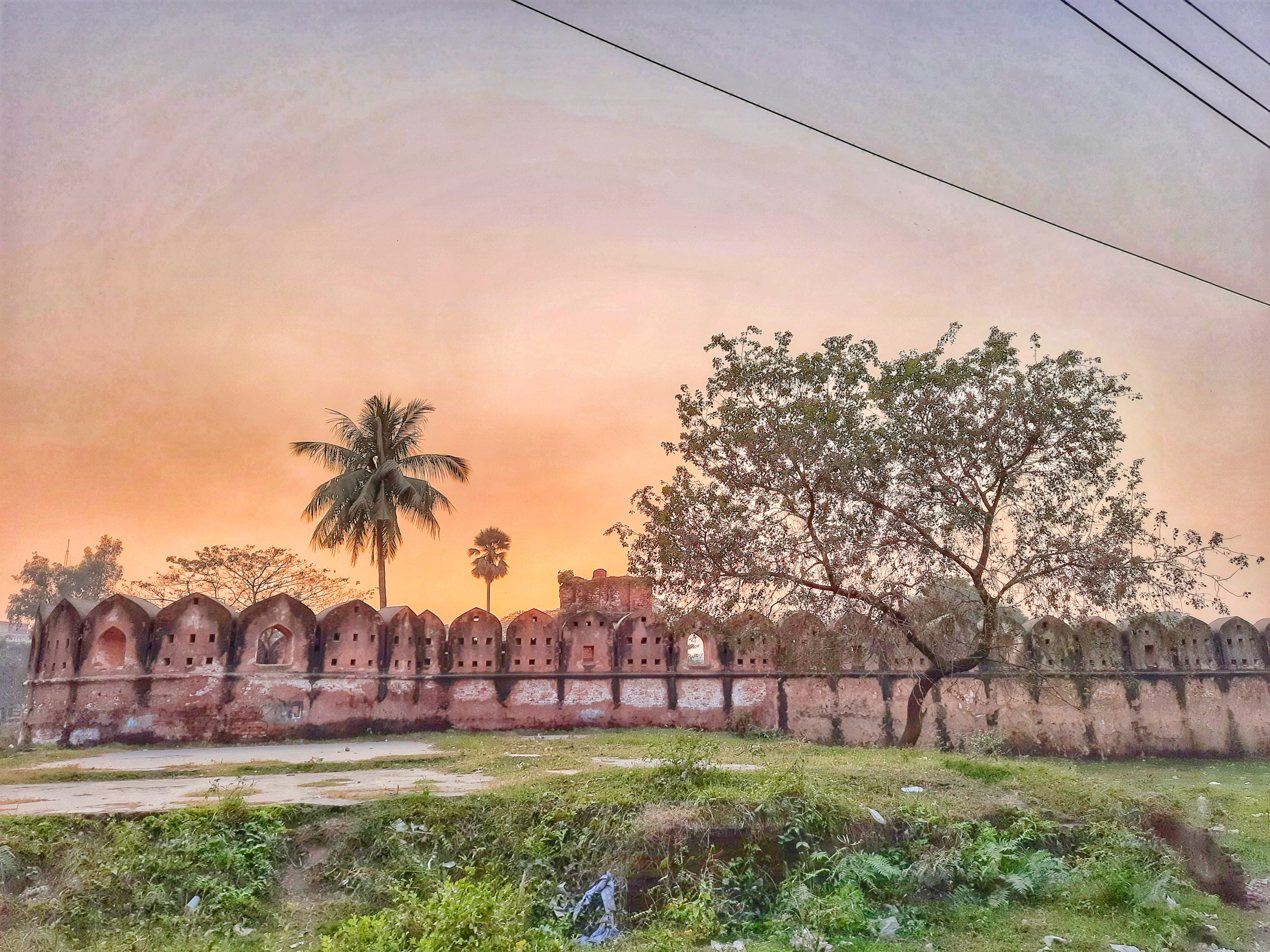
Wall of the fort

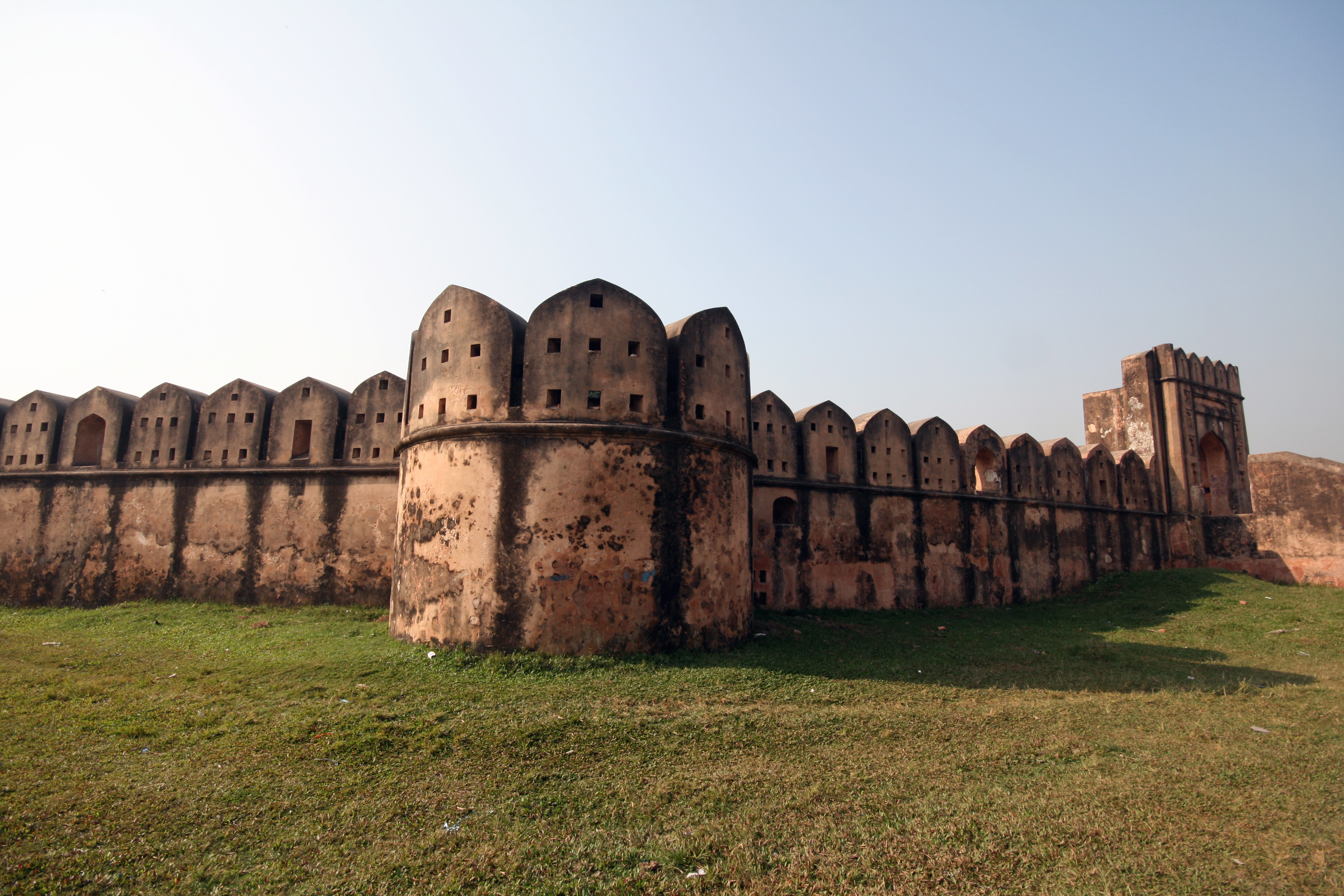
Corner towers

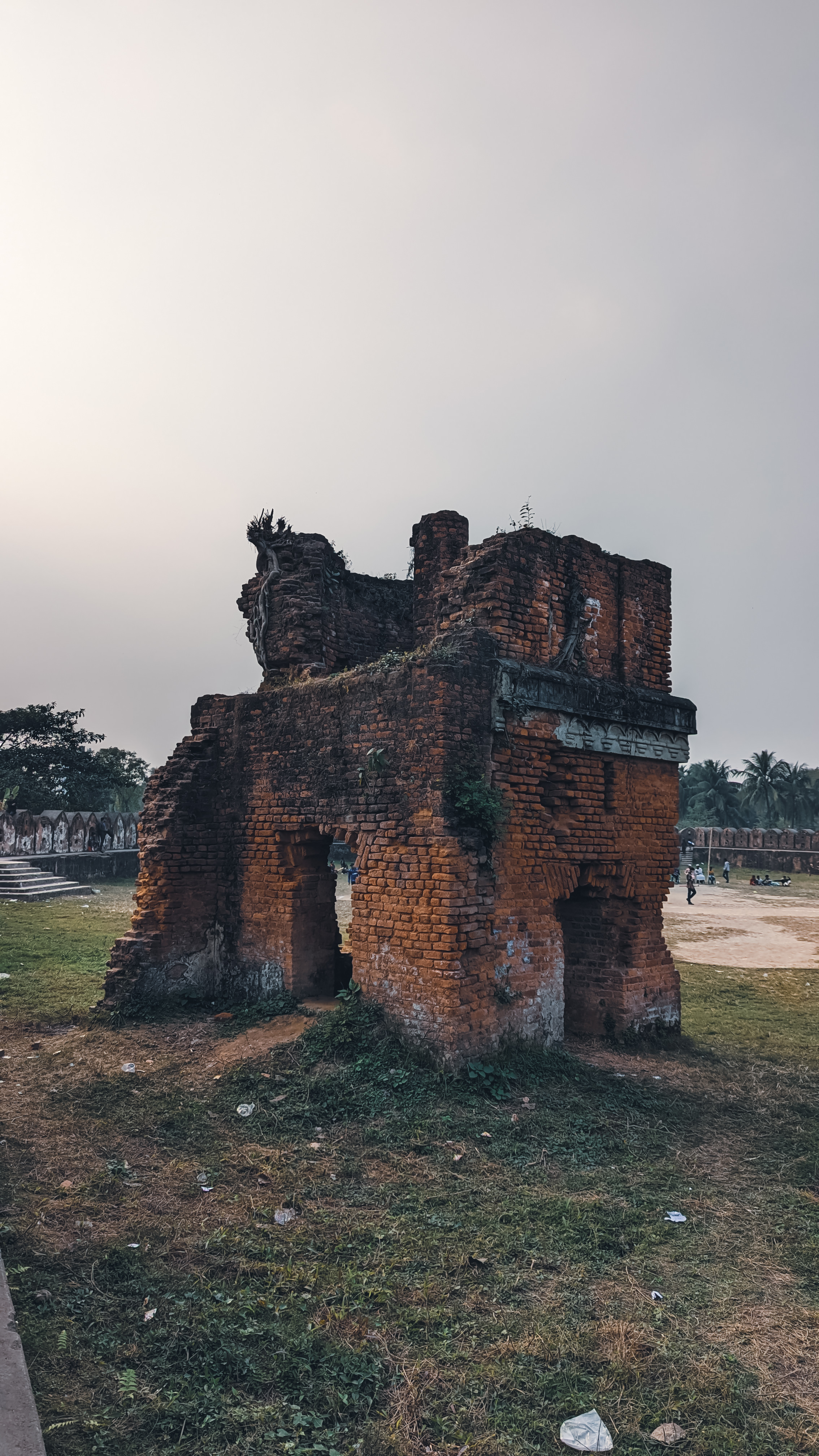
Watch tower in ruins

== See also ==
- List of archaeological sites in Bangladesh
