= Narayanganj City Corporation =

Local governing body of Narayanganj, Banglades

Narayanganj City Corporation নারায়ণগঞ্জ সিটি কর্পোরেশন
- Emblem of Narayanganj City Corporation

Type
- Type: City Corporation

History
- Founded: May 5, 2011; 15 years ago
- New session started: 23 February 2026

Leadership
- Mayor: Sakhawat Hossain Khan
- Administrator: Sakhawat Hossain Khan, BNP since 23 February 2026
- Deputy Mayor: Vacant since 19 August 2024
- Chief Executive Officer: Mohammad Zakir Hossain since 19 August 2024

Structure
- Seats: Vacant seats 36 councillors
- Length of term: Up to five years

Elections
- Voting system: First past the post
- Last election: 16 January 2022
- Next election: TBD

Meeting place
- Nagar Bhaban, Narayanganj

Website
- www.ncc.gov.bd

Narayanganj City Corporation (Bengali: নারায়ণগঞ্জ সিটি কর্পোরেশন - in short: NCC), is a local government authority responsible for administering all civic services in Narayanganj, the city of Bangladesh. The NCC government is elected by popular vote every five years. The corporation is headed by a mayor, who oversees a council consisting of 36 councillors representing different wards of the city. The functions and powers of the NCC are defined under the provisions of the City Corporation Act, 2009.

It was formed comprising Narayanganj Town, Siddhirganj Municipal area and Kadamrasul Municipality.

== About ==
NCC is a formation under the local government administration of Bangladesh to regulate the city area of Narayanganj, which is under the Ministry of Local Government & Rural Development (LGRD). It consists of 27 wards including 9 reserve seats for women. Before its establishment as city corporation, it was a municipal corporation. NCC has a total area of 72.43 square kilometers with approximately has the population of 967,887 people in the city corporation area.

== Significant places ==
- River Shitalakshya
- Narayanganj River Port
- Shahid Minar
- Freedom Monument
- Ram Krishna Mission
- Narayanganj Club
- Shudijon Pathagar
- Ali Ahmad Chunka Pathagar
- Bibi Marium Majar
- Siddhirganj Power Station
- Narayanganj Silo
- Kumodiny Trust
- Adamjee EPZ
- Narayanganj City Park

== Functions and Services ==
The Narayanganj City Corporation (NCC) is responsible for administering the city and ensuring the provision of essential infrastructure and public services. Its functions include urban planning, transport management, healthcare, education, waste management, water supply, and security. Through these services, NCC aims to improve the quality of life for residents and promote sustainable urban development.

Departments of Narayanganj City Corporation
#	Departments	Functions / Services
1	Office of the Mayor	Executive administration; city governance; supervision of all NCC services
2	Chief Executive Office	Departmental coordination; service implementation monitoring
3	Administration And Establishment	HR management; staff recruitment; service delivery monitoring
4	Finance and Accounts	Budget preparation; financial planning; payment processing; accounts management; internal audit
5	Engineering	Road-cutting permission; building design approval; contractor registration; land demarcation certificates
6	Urban Planning and Development	Road, drain, bridge, culvert and footpath development; land development; planned residential areas; city beautification
7	Electricity	Installation and maintenance of street lights; lamp-post management; city illumination
8	Transportation and Communication	Urban transport management; traffic & parking control; emergency transport; corpse handling; bus terminal management; road roller & ambulance services
9	Waste Management and Cleaning	Solid waste collection and disposal; street cleaning; drain clearing; mosquito control; landfill management
10	Health	Hospital & clinic management; maternal & child immunization; vitamin A campaigns; midwifery and health technology training
11	Registrar	Birth & death certificates; nationality, inheritance & character certificates
12	Education	Management of schools, madrasas, Sanskrit tolls, kindergartens, technical institutes; adult education; teacher training; cultural & theatre institutes
13	Water Supply and Sewerage	Water supply coordination; sewerage management under Dhaka WASA
14	Revenue	Trade license issuance & renewal; holding tax collection; shop/market allotment; lease and asset management
15	Security and Law and Order	City security; joint operations with Narayanganj District Police; CCTV installation and monitoring
16	Magistracy	Arbitration-based case settlement; mobile courts; anti-adulteration drives
17	Housing and Public Works	Distribution and maintenance of residential plots and flats
18	Cultural and Social Development	National Day celebrations; charity programs; and children's park and playground construction & maintenance
19	Environmental Protection	Pollution control; climate change mitigation; urban greening; tree plantation
20	Religious Welfare	Support for Eid, Puja, and religious events; Qurbani market permissions; land allocation for religious events

== Antiquities establishment ==
- Hajiganj Fort
- Sonakanda Fort
- Kadamrasul Darga
- Asrafia Jame Masjid

== Annual budget ==
Narayanganj City Corporation (NCC) has announced a budget of ৳775 crore (US$63 million) for 2025-26 fiscal year.

== Wards and councillors ==
Narayanganj City Corporation is administratively divided into 27 wards. Each ward is represented by one elected councillor, while additional reserved women councillors are elected for groups of wards, as provided under the Local Government (City Corporation) Act.

Ward Serial of Narayanganj City Corporation

=== Councillors of Narayanganj City Corporation ===
Ward	Locations Covered	Councillor	Party
Ward-1	Fatullah central	Vacant	TBD
Ward-2	Panchabati area	Vacant	TBD
Ward-3	Kutubpur north	Vacant	TBD
Ward-4	Enayetnagar	Vacant	TBD
Ward-5	Dapa area	Vacant	TBD
Ward-6	Aliganj	Vacant	TBD
Ward-7	Pagla	Vacant	TBD
Ward-8	Lamapara	Vacant	TBD
Ward-9	Isdair west	Vacant	TBD
Ward-10	Chashara central	Vacant	TBD
Ward-11	Nitaiganj	Vacant	TBD
Ward-12	Tanbazar	Vacant	TBD
Ward-13	Bandar central	Vacant	TBD
Ward-14	Bandar riverfront	Vacant	TBD
Ward-15	Siddhirganj north	Vacant	TBD
Ward-16	Adamjee EPZ	Vacant	TBD
Ward-17	Sanarpar	Vacant	TBD
Ward-18	Mizmizi	Vacant	TBD
Ward-19	Siddhirganj south	Vacant	TBD
Ward-20	Kanchpur	Vacant	TBD
Ward-21	Signboard area	Vacant	TBD
Ward-22	Shibu Market	Vacant	TBD
Ward-23	BSCIC industrial zone	Vacant	TBD
Ward-24	Delpara	Vacant	TBD
Ward-25	Bandar south	Vacant	TBD
Ward-26	Kadam Rasul	Vacant	TBD
Ward-27	Nabiganj	Vacant	TBD
Reserved women's seats
28	Women's seat-1	Vacant	TBD
29	Women's seat-2	Vacant	TBD
30	Women's seat-3	Vacant	TBD
31	Women's seat-4	Vacant	TBD
32	Women's seat-5	Vacant	TBD
33	Women's seat-6	Vacant	TBD
34	Women's seat-7	Vacant	TBD
35	Women's seat-8	Vacant	TBD
36	Women's seat-9	Vacant	TBD

== List of mayors ==
Political parties

- Bangladesh Awami League
- Bangladesh Nationalist Party

Other factions

- Independent

Status

- Acting Mayor and Administrator

No.	Portrait	Officeholder (birth–death)	Election	Term of office			Designation	Political party	Reference
No.	Portrait	Officeholder (birth–death)	Election	From	To	Period	Designation	Political party	Reference
1		Dr. Selina Hayat Ivy	2011; 2016; 2022	5 May 2011	19 August 2024	13 years, 106 days	Mayor	Bangladesh Awami League	
–		A. H. M. Kamruzzaman	–	19 August 2024	22 February 2026	1 year, 188 days	Administrator	Independent	
–		Sakhawat Hossain Khan	–	23 February 2026	Incumbent	206 days	Administrator	Bangladesh Nationalist Party	

== Deputies ==
The deputy mayor (also known as Panel mayor) is a second-ranking official of city corporation. 3 Panel mayors are appointed by vote of councillors. The 1st panel mayor with the highest number of votes is appointed as deputy mayor. In the absence of the mayor, the deputy mayor controls all functions of the City Corporation.

Serial No.	Post	Name
01	Panel Mayor 1	Vacant
02	Panel Mayor 2	Vacant
03	Panel Mayor 3	Vacant

== Past elections ==
=== Election results 2022 ===
Narayanganj Mayoral Election 2022
Party	Candidate	Votes	%	±%
AL	Dr. Selina Hayat Ivy	159,057	54.66	−9.44
Independent	Taimur Alam Khandaker	92,562	31.80	+31.80
IAB	Machum Billah	23,987	8.24	+8.24
Khelafat Majlis	ABM Shirzul Mamun	10,782	3.70	+3.70
Majority		66,495	22.86	−6.49
Turnout		290,991	56.23	+0.21
Registered electors		517,351		
AL hold				

=== Election results 2016 ===
Narayanganj Mayoral Election 2016
Party	Candidate	Votes	%	±%
AL	Dr. Selina Hayat Ivy	175,611	64.10	+8.64
BNP	Sakhawat Hossain Khan	96,044	35.06	+27.24
Majority		79,567	29.04	−6.83
Turnout		271,655	56.02	−5.01
Registered electors		484,931		
AL gain from Independent				

=== Election results 2011 ===
Narayanganj Mayoral Election 2011
Party	Candidate	Votes	%	±%
Independent	Dr. Selina Hayat Ivy	180,048	63.03	New
AL	Shamim Osman	78,705	27.57	New
BNP	Taimur Alam Khandaker	7,616	2.67	New
Majority		101,343	35.46	New
Turnout		282,593	61.03	New
Registered electors		463,050		
Independent win (new seat)				
