= Mirza Muhammad Amin Shahristani =

Persian noble and Indian official (died 1637)

- Mir Jumla
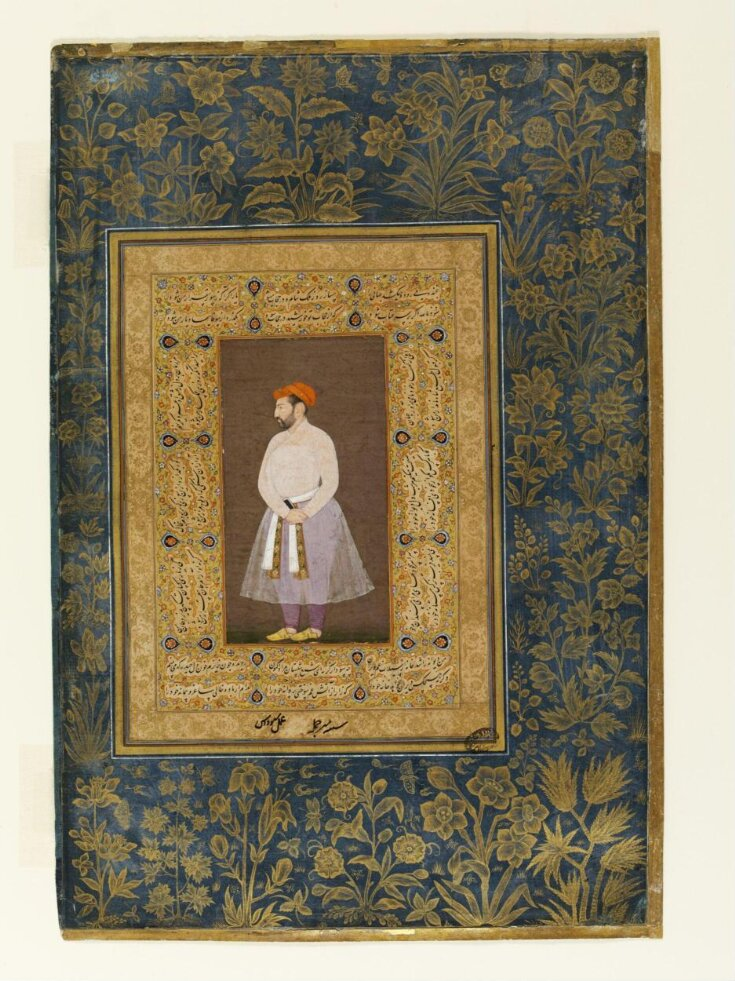
- Mir Jumla by Shiv Das, c. 1618–20
- Died: 13 September 1637; Agra

Mirza Muhammad Amin Shahristani (died 13 September 1637) was a nobleman who served in the courts of the Golconda Sultanate, Safavid Empire, and the Mughal Empire.

== Biography ==
Mirza Muhammad was from the prominent Sayyid Shahrestani family family hailing from Shahristan, near Isfahan. A few of his relatives held high posts in the Safavid administration, and his nephew married one of the daughters of Shah Abbas.

He emigrated to Golconda and Mir Mu'min, who was the prime minister of the Golconda Sultanate, recommended him to the ruler Muhammad Quli Qutb Shah, who awarded him the title of Mir Jumla. He was at the helm of the kingdom's administration, and would continue to serve in the court until Muhammad Quli's death in 1610.

Upon the death of Muhammad Quli, his nephew Sultan Muhammad succeeded him. The Mirza, who had been against Sultan Muhammad's accession, resigned and was allowed to emigrate from the kingdom. He went to the royal court of Bijapur, but was unable to obtain a position there.

He was able to secure an appointment in the court of Shah Abbas in 1614, where he served for four years. In 1618, he went to Agra, the capital of the Mughal empire, upon the invitation of the emperor Jahangir. After presenting some gifts to the emperor, he was awarded a position at court, with a mansab of 1,500 zat and 200 sawar. He was promoted at various intervals during his service, and in 1636, was awarded the title of Mir Bakshi, along with 5,000 zat and 2,000 sawar. He died on 13 September 1637, and was buried in Agra.

== Poetry ==
The Mirza was a poet as well, and wrote with the takhallus (pen name) Ruhu'l-Amin. He composed several imitations of works of Nizami Ganjavi. His diwan (collection of poems) containing ghazals written by him was entitled Gulistan-i Naz.
