= Selina Hayat Ivy =

Bangladeshi politician

Salina Hayat Ivy
- সেলিনা হায়াৎ আইভী
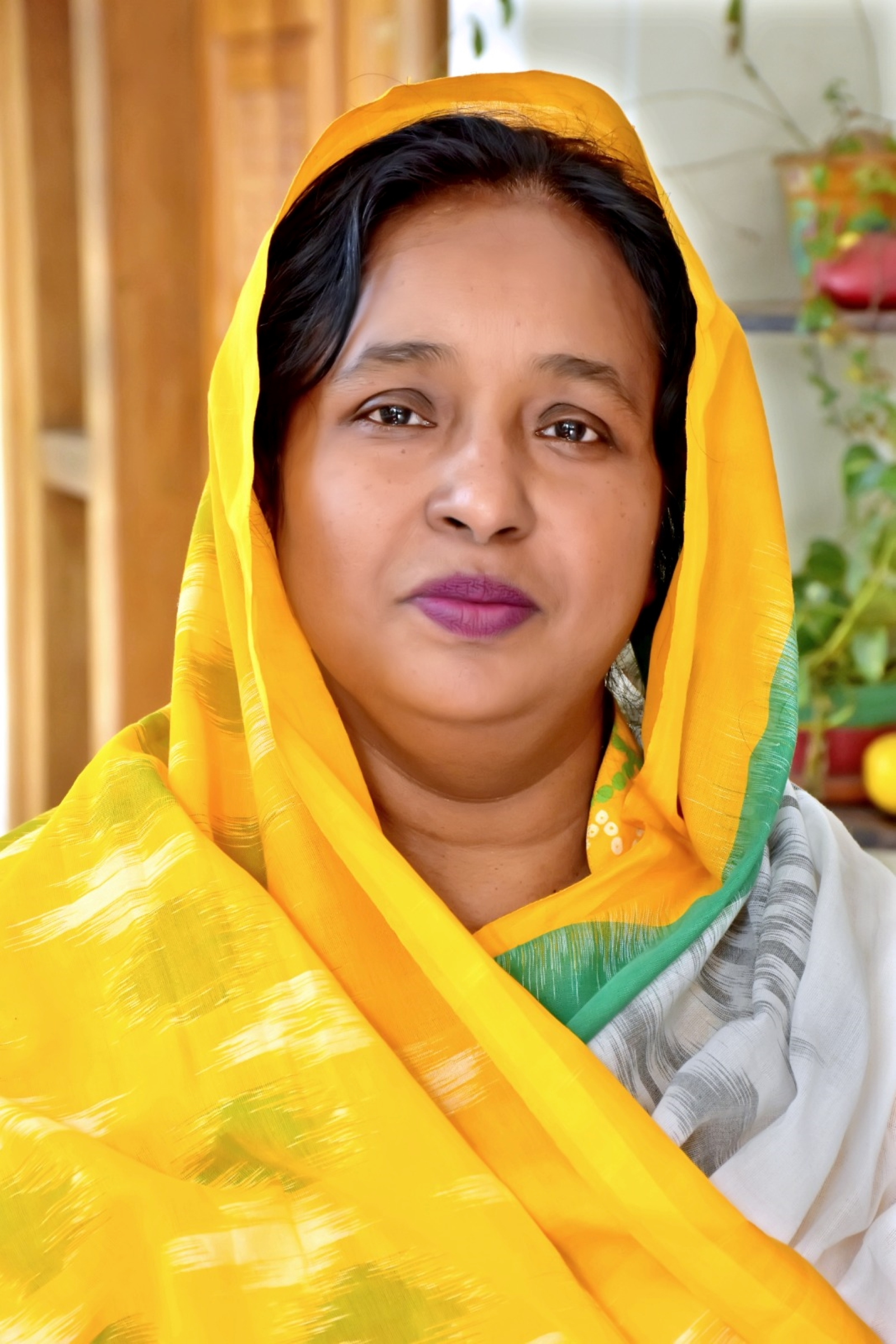
- Salina Hayat Ivy

1st Mayor of Narayanganj
- In office 5 May 2011 – 19 August 2024
- Preceded by: Post Established
- Succeeded by: A. H. M. Kamruzzaman (as Administrator)

Personal details
- Born: 5 June 1966 (age 60) Narayanganj, East Pakistan
- Party: Bangladesh Awami League
- Spouse: Kazi Ahsan Hayat
- Children: Shadman; Sharjil
- Parents: Ali Ahmed Chunka (father); Mamataj Begum (mother)
- Education: Odesa National Medical University; Mitford Hospital
- Profession: Politician
- Awards: Anannya Top Ten Awards (2016) Bangla Academy Award (2022)

Salina Hayat Ivy (born June 5) is a Bangladeshi politician, physician, and the first mayor of Narayanganj City Corporation. She was given the status of State Minister on August 8, 2022, along with the Mayor of Chattragram. She won her third term as mayor in the Narayanganj City Corporation election in 2022.

== Early life and education ==
Salina Hayat Ivy was born on June 6, 1966, in a political family in Narayanganj District. Her father was former Narayanganj municipal chairman Ali Ahmed Chunka and her mother was Momtaz Begum. Ivy is the first child among the five children. She started her education at Dewvog Akhra Primary School. Later, she was admitted to Narayanganj Preparatory School, where she studied until the sixth grade. Then, she was admitted to Morgan Girls High School. She got a junior scholarship in 1979 and passed her secondary school certificate examination in 1982. Then, she joined the Odesa National Medical University in 1985 on a scholarship from the Soviet government and earned a medical degree with merit in 1992. Later, in 1992–93, she completed her internship at Mitford Hospital. Ivy worked as an honorary doctor at Midwest Hospital in 1993–94 and in Narayanganj's 200-bed hospital in 1994–95. Previously, she had also run the municipality for eight years, beginning in 2003. She is affiliated with the Awami League.

== Political career ==
In 1993, Ivy was the health and environmental affairs officer of the Narayanganj City Awami League. Her political career began in 2003 when she participated in the municipal chairman election. In 2003, she was elected Chairperson of Narayanganj Municipality and became the first female Chairperson of Narayanganj Municipality. In 2011, She defeated Awami League-backed candidate and incumbent MP Shamim Osman by 120,000 votes to become the Narayanganj mayor for the first time. She was re-elected in 2016 and again in 2022, each time securing a majority of the votes. In the 2016 mayoral election, Ivy received approximately 106,887 votes, about 44,000 more than her closest rival. Her 2022 re-election saw her winning with a vote count of 159,057 to 161,273, surpassing her nearest competitor by a margin of approximately 66,000 to 69,000 votes. She also acted as the vice president of the Narayanganj City Awami League. Dr. Salina Hayat Ivy is the founder and president of the Ali Ahmad Chunka Foundation and the Narayanganj Heart Foundation. She is also in charge of the convening of the Narayanganj district of Swadhinata Chikitsak Parishad.

She was jailed after 2024 July Revolution for 5 murder cases, but she got bailed in early 2026.

== Personal life ==
Salina Hayat Ivy is married to Kazi Ahsan Hayat from New Zealand. They have two sons named Shadman Kazi and Sharjil Kazi.

== Awards ==
- Anannya Top Ten Awards (2015)
- Bangla Academy Award (2022)
