= Baidyer Bazar Union =

- Union
- Location in Bangladesh
- Coordinates: 23.6669°N 90.6264°E
- Country: Bangladesh
- Division: Dhaka Division
- District: Narayanganj District
- Upazilas: Sonargaon Upazila

Area
  - Total: 9.6 km^{2} (3.7 sq mi)

Population (2001)
  - Total: 19,797
- Time zone: UTC+6 (BST)

Baidyer Bazar Union is a union, the smallest administrative body of Bangladesh, located in Sonargaon Upazila, Narayanganj District, Bangladesh. The total population per 2001 census is 19,797.
