= Shahrestani family =

The Shahrestani family (Persian: خاندان شهرستانی) was one of the leading families in Isfahan during the Safavid era. This family was descended from Musa al-Kazim and lived in the Jay neighborhood of Isfahan, which had earlier been called "Shahrestan". Members of the Shahrestani family entered the Safavid court starting from the reign of Shah Ismail I (r. 1501–1524).

The first prominent figure of this family was Mir Sayyed Sharif Shahrestani, who became the mostowfi ol-mamalek (Minister of Finance). His son, Amir Abol-Fotuh Shahrestani, was the warden of the shrines of the Fourteen Infallibles and Imamzadehs) during the reign of Shah Tahmasp I (r. 1524–1576). Mirza Mohammad, the son of Amir Abol-Fotuh Shahrestani, was an erudite jurist, whose fatwas were considered important by his peers, though he never accepted government positions or titles.

The descendants of Mirza Mohammad's son Amir Jalal al-Din Hasan mostly served in the clergy, including Mirza Ruhollah Shahrestani (contemporary with Shah Soltan Hoseyn) and Seyyed Mohammad Mehdi Shahrestani, a prominent scholar in Karbala during the late 18th century.
