= Narayanganj =

Narayanganj নারায়ণগঞ্জ (Bengali)
- Metropolis
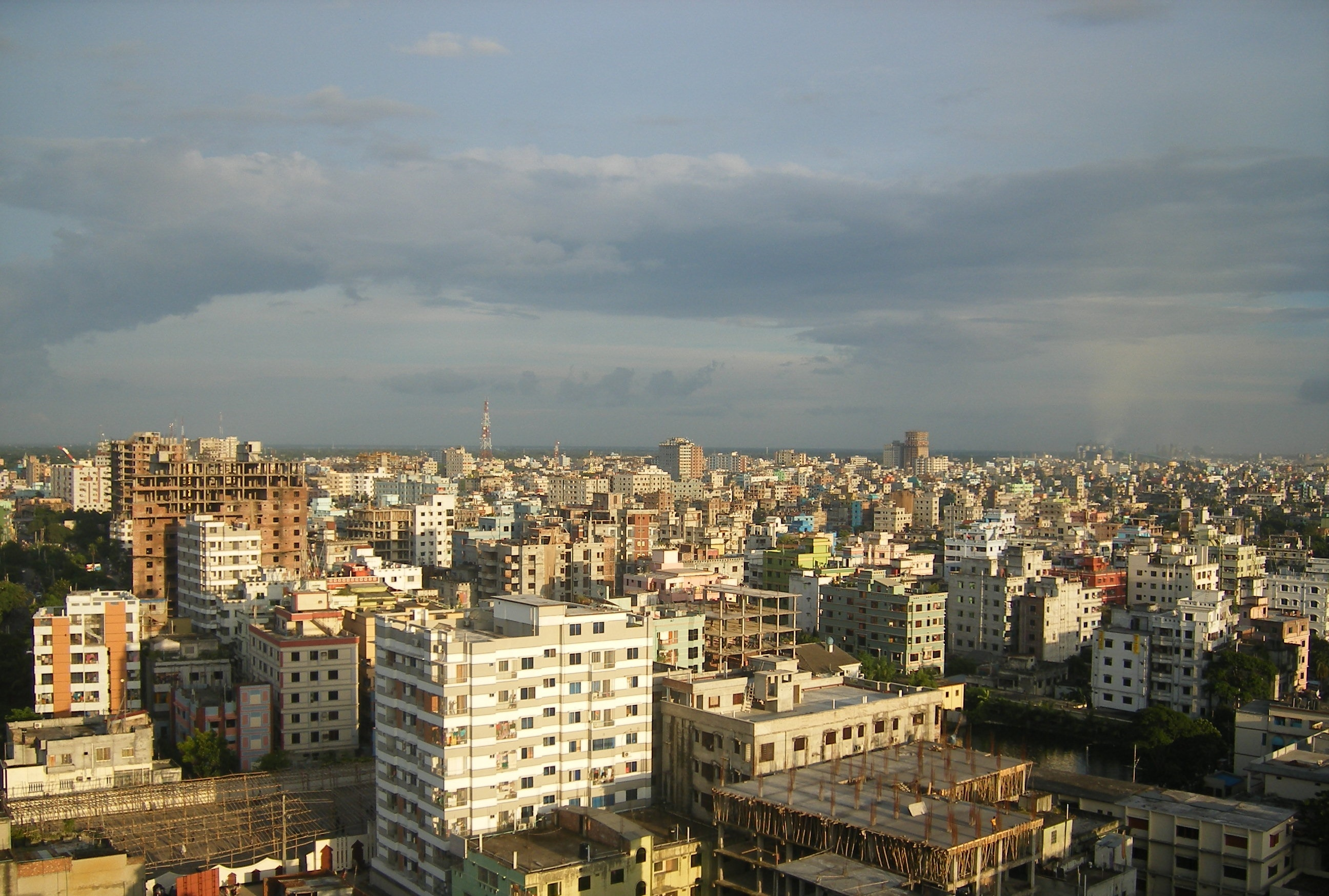
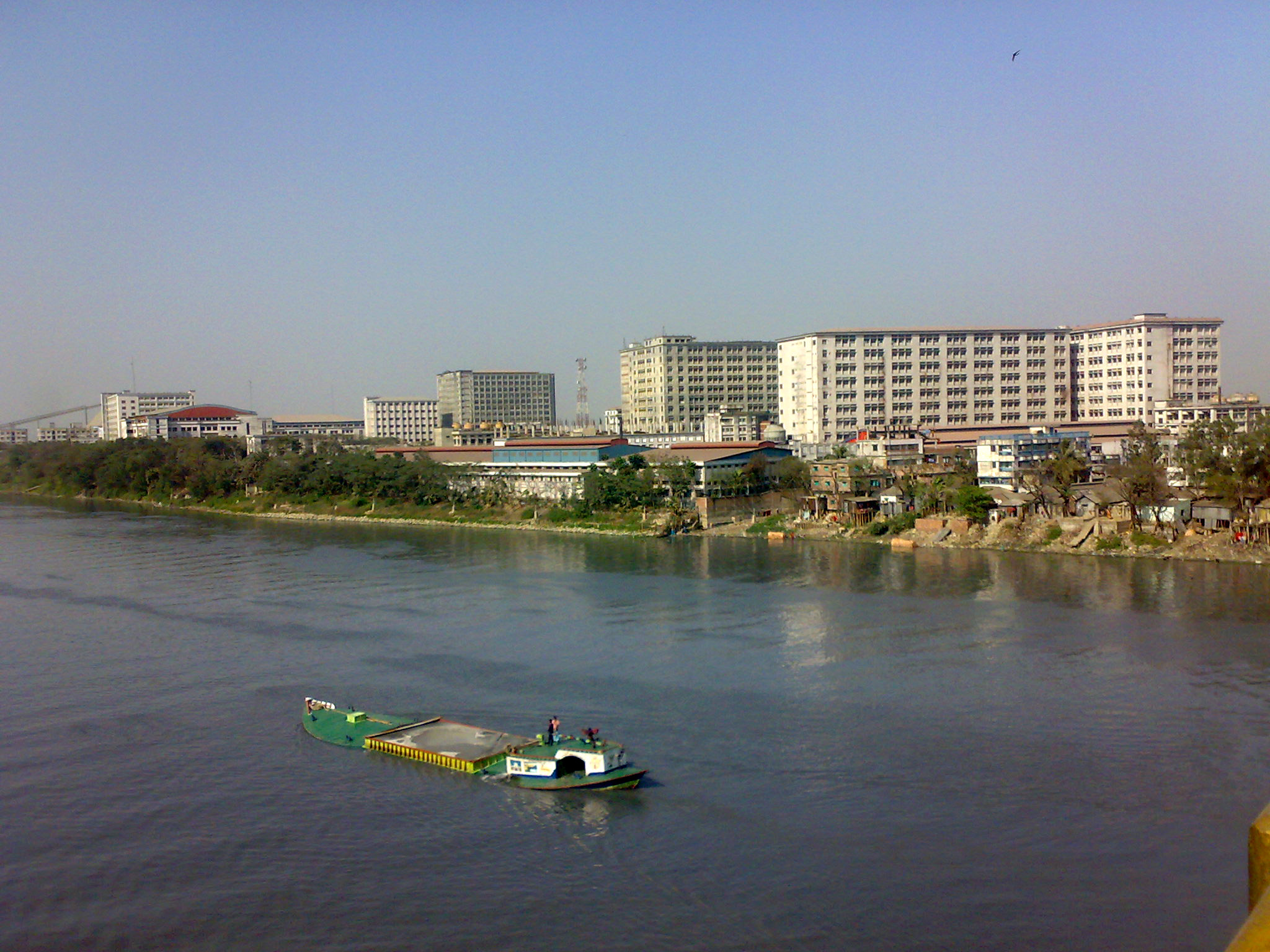
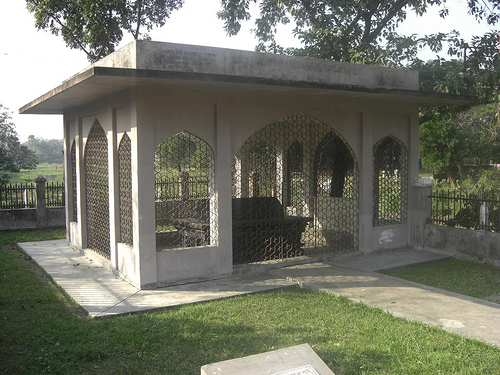
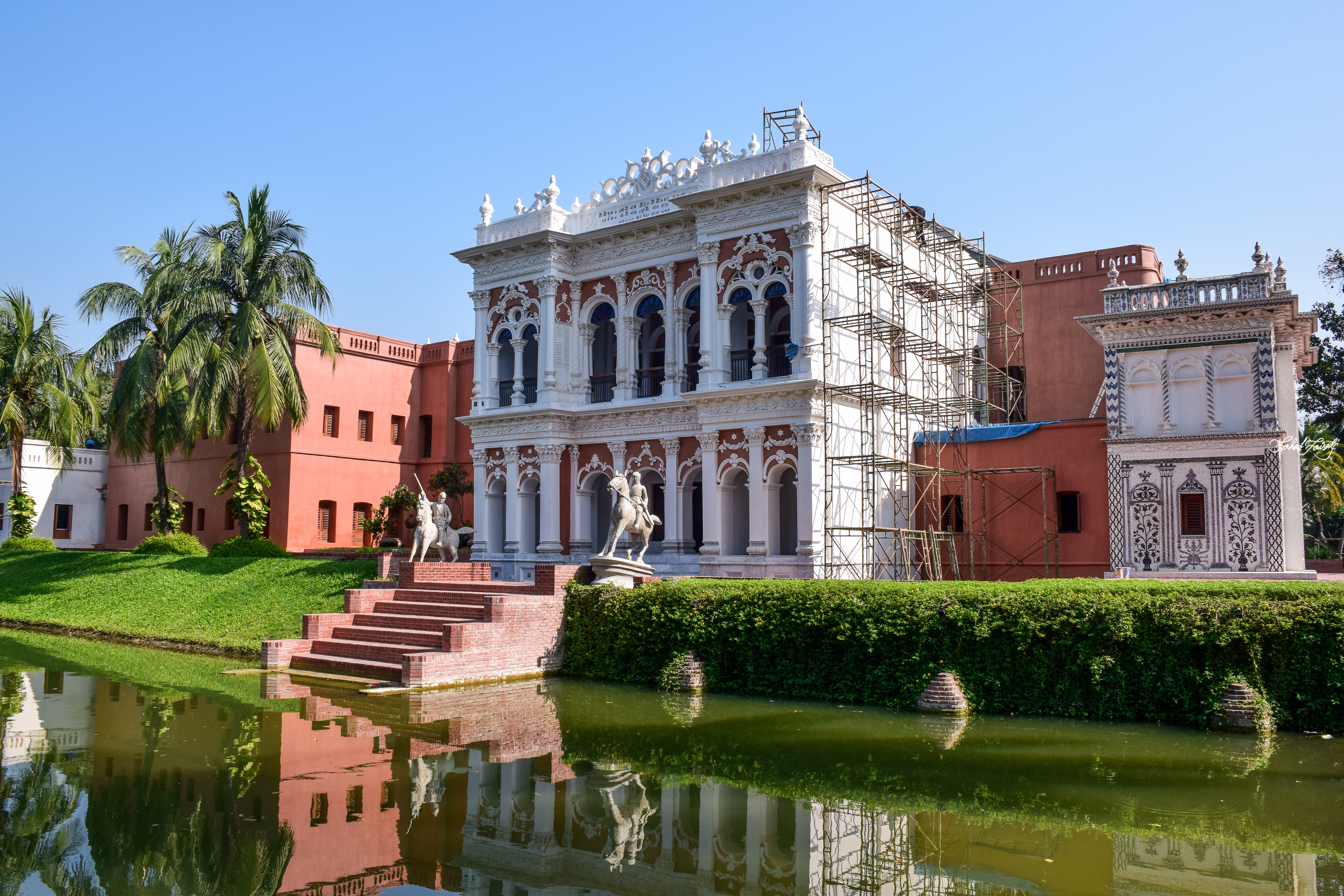
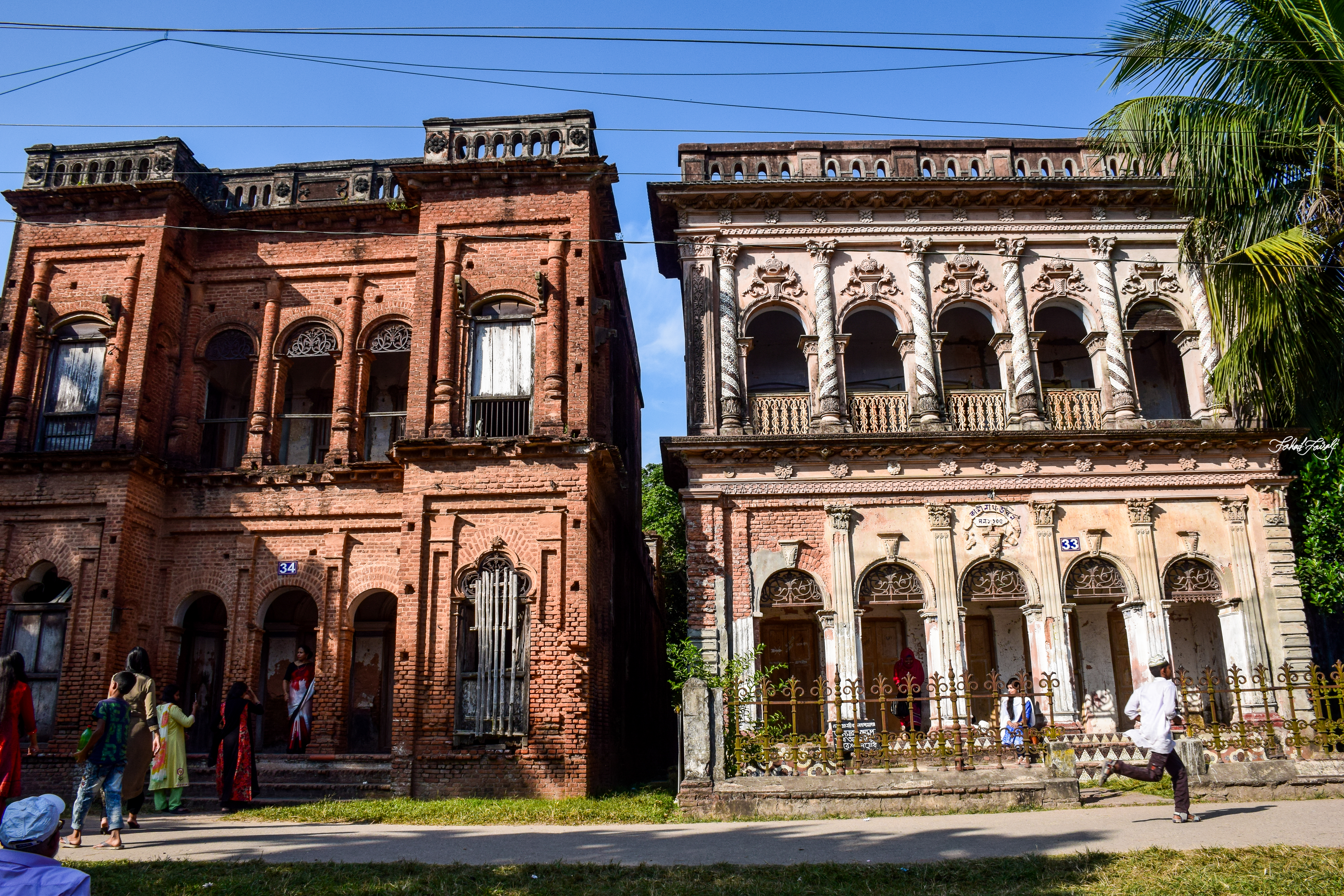
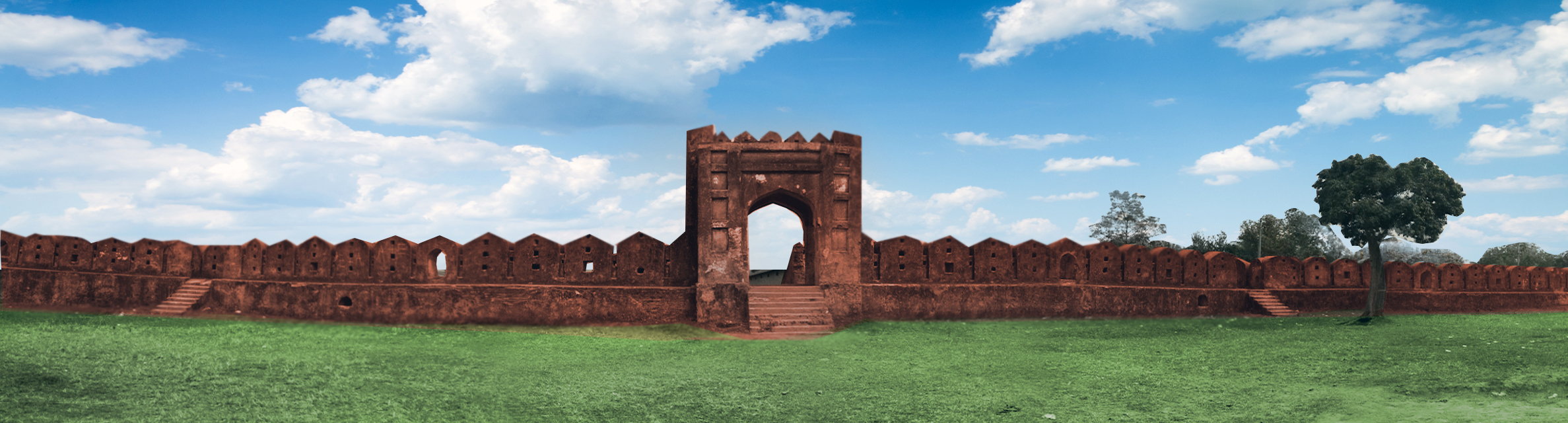
- From top: City Skyline, Port of Narayanganj, Tomb of Sultan Ghiyasuddin Azam Shah , Baro-Bhuyan Palace of Lord Isa Khan, Historical Panam City, Hajiganj Fort in City East

- Location in Bangladesh Narayanganj (Bangladesh)
- Country: Bangladesh
- Division: Dhaka
- District: Narayanganj
- Municipal Board: 8 September 1876
- Metropolitan city: 5 May 2011

Government
  - Type: Mayor-Council
  - Body: Narayanganj City Corporation
  - Administrator: Md Sakhawat Hossain Khan
  - City Council: 27 constituencies
  - Parliament: 1 constituencies

Area
  - Metropolis: 33.57 km^{2} (12.96 sq mi)
  - Water: 48.56 km^{2} (18.75 sq mi)
  - Metro: 72.43 km^{2} (27.97 sq mi)
- Elevation: 5 m (16 ft)

Population (2022)
  - Metropolis: 967,951
  - Density: 28,830/km^{2} (74,680/sq mi)
  - City Rank: 5th in Bangladesh

Languages
  - Official: Bengali • English
  - Regional: Dhakaiya Kutti · Eastern Bengali
- Time zone: UTC+6 (Bangladesh Time)
- Postal code: 1400
- Calling code: +880 671
- UN/LOCODE: BD NRG
- GDP (2022): PPP ▲$4.8 billion Nominal ▲$1.9 billion
- HDI (2023): 0.701 high · 5th of 22
- Website: ncc.gov.bd

Narayanganj (Bengali: নারায়ণগঞ্জ, romanized: Narayongônj) is the seat of Narayanganj District, and the third-largest city in Dhaka Division in central Bangladesh. It is about 16 km (10 mi) southeast of the capital city of Dhaka, in the Greater Dhaka area. With a population of about 967,951 as of 2022, it is the fourth most-populous city in Bangladesh. It is also a center of business and industry, especially the jute trade and processing plants, and the textile sector of the country. It is nicknamed the Dundee of Bangladesh, due to the presence of its many jute mills. (Dundee was the first industrialised 'Juteopolis' in the world.)

== History ==
The city got its name from Bicon Lal Pandey, a Hindu religious leader who was also known as Benur Thakur or 'Lakshmi Narayan Thakur'. He leased the area from the British East India Company in 1766 following the Battle of Plassey. He donated the markets and the land on the banks of the river as Devottor or 'Given to God' property, bequeathed for maintenance expenses for the worship of the god Narayan.

A post office was set up in 1866, and Dhaka-Narayanganj telegraph service was started in 1877. The Bank of Bengal introduced the first telephone service in 1882.

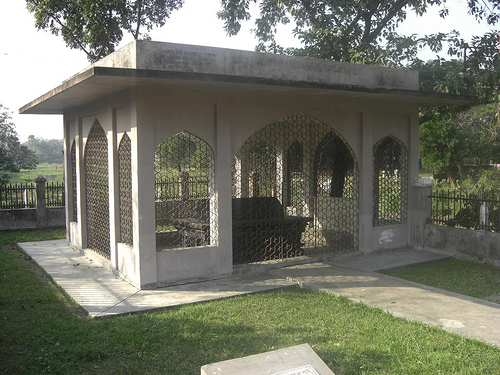
Tomb of Ghiyasuddin Azam Shah, Narayanganj, Bangladesh. ca 1410

The Narayanganj Municipality was incorporated on 8 September 1876. The first hospital in the area of Narayanganj Victoria Hospital was established in 1885 by the Municipality with financial contributions from Harakanta Banerjee.

Narayanganj City Corporation was established on 5 May 2011, unifying three former municipalities: Narayanganj Municipality, Siddhirganj Municipality, and Kadam Rasul Municipality. The mayor of Narayanganj City Corporation (NCC) is Selina Hayat Ivy. Prior to this, she was the mayor of Narayanganj Municipality.

== Demographics ==
Religions in Narayanganj City Corporation (2022)
Religion	Percent
Islam	92.75%
Hinduism	7.17%
Other or not stated	0.08%

According to the 2022 Census of Bangladesh, present-day Narayanganj City Corporation had 255,468 households and a population of 967,951. The average household size was 3.74. Narayanganj had a literacy rate (age 7 and over) of 83.66%, compared to the national average of 74.80%, and a sex ratio of 99.85.

Narayanganj has four railway stations named Pagla Halt railway station, Fatulla railway station, Chashara railway station and Narayanganj railway station. From Dhaka anyone can use three roads to enter the city: Dhaka–Narayanganj old road, Dhaka–Narayanganj link road and Narayanganj–Demra road. The BRTC AC Bus gives bus transport service from Narayanganj to Dhaka.

== Educational Institutes ==
Narayanganj city has many educational institutes. Government Tolaram College was established in 1937, it is located near Chashara at the center of the city. Govt. Tolaram College had 90.48% of passing rate on their HSC exams, and only 6.75% of the students got A+. Narayanganj Government Women's College, another college located in the center of the city, has its passing rate around at 82.99%, and A+ rate at 9.88%.

Prominent high schools in Narayanganj are Adarsha School Narayanganj, Narayanganj Government Girls' High School, and Morgan Girls High School. The latter two ones are girls-only school, and the former one is a co-educational school.

== Notable people ==
- Abdul Matin Chowdhury – Politician
- Mohammad Abdur Rashid – Judge
- Golam Dastagir Gazi – Politician
- Selina Hayat Ivy – Politician
- Tamij Uddin Rizvi – Freedom fighter, Film director
- Monem Munna – Footballer
- Topu Barman – Footballer
- Mohammed Sujan – Footballer
- Siddique Dewan – Footballer
- Ashraf Uddin Ahmed Chunnu – Footballer
- Alauddin Khan – Footballer

== See also ==
- Narayanganj Sadar Upazila
- Narayanganj District
- List of cities and towns in Bangladesh
