= N2 (Bangladesh) =

National Highway in Bangladesh

N2
- Dhaka–Sylhet Highway; Sylhet–Tamabil Highway
- Map of the N2 in red

Route information
- Part of AH1 AH2
- Maintained by Bangladesh Road Transport Authority
- Length: 287 km (178 mi)

Major junctions
- South end: Kanchpur
- List: N1 in Kanchpur R201 in Tarabo Z1090 in Borpa R202 in Bhulta N105 in Bhulta R203 in Bhulta R301 in Pachdona R210 in Shahepratap R211 in Itakhola R360 in Bhairab N102 in Sarail R220 in Sarail N204 in Jagadishpur R240 & N204 in Shaistaganj N207 in Mirpur R240 in Aushkandi R241 in Syedpur N207 in Sherpur
- North end: Tamabil

Location
- Country: Bangladesh

Highway system
- Roads in Bangladesh
| ← N1 | → N3 |

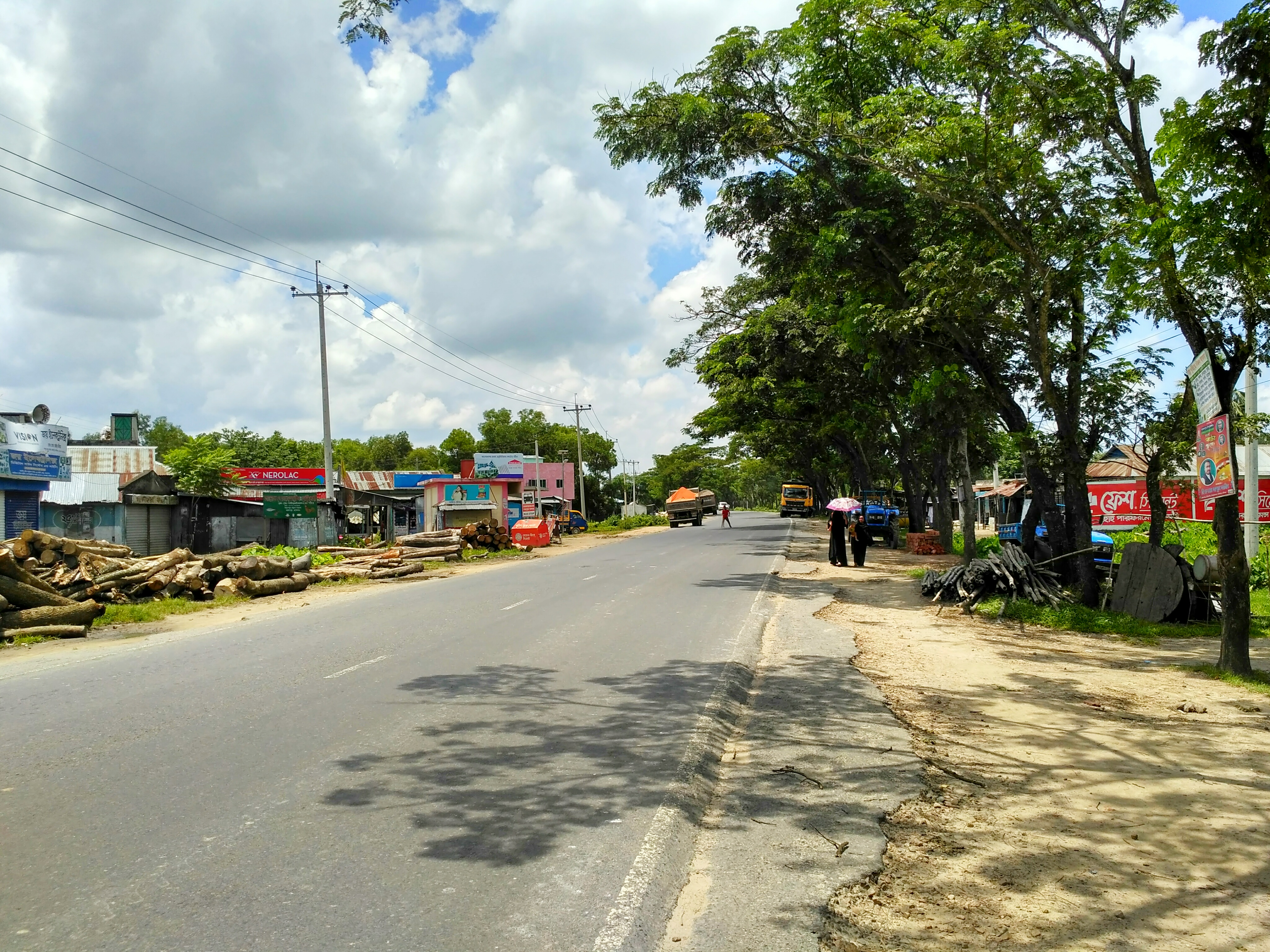
N2 near Shahpur bus station, Madhabpur, Habiganj.

The N2 is a Bangladeshi national highway connecting the capital Dhaka and the town of Tamabil in the Sylhet District at the Indian border. The route passes through the city of Sylhet, crossing the Surma River on the Keane bridge. Sections of the highway are known as the Dhaka–Sylhet Highway and the Sylhet–Tamabil Highway. It is part of AH1 and AH2 highways in the Asian Highway Network.

A project is currently underway to upgrade the two-lane Dhaka–Sylhet–Tamabil highway, parts of which have been described as among the most accident-prone in the country, to six lanes.

== Route ==
| Division | District | Location | Kilometres | Miles | Destinations |
|---|---|---|---|---|---|
| Dhaka Division | Narayanganj District | Kachpur Union, Sonargaon Upazila | 0.00 | 0.00 | N1 — Start of road |
| Dhaka Division | Narayanganj District | Tarabo, Rupganj Upazila | 2.27 | 1.41 | R201 |
| Dhaka Division | Narayanganj District | Bulta Union, Rupganj Upazila | 11.01 | 6.84 | R202 |
| Dhaka Division | Narayanganj District | Bulta Union, Rupganj Upazila | 11.40 | 7.08 | N105 |
| Dhaka Division | Narayanganj District | Bulta Union, Rupganj Upazila | 11.58 | 7.20 | R203 |
| Dhaka Division | Narsingdi District | Panchdona, Narsingdi Sadar Upazila | 30.13 | 18.72 | R301 |
| Dhaka Division | Narsingdi District | Shaheprotap, Narsingdi Sadar Upazila | 33.40 | 20.76 | R210 |
| Dhaka Division | Narsingdi District | Itakhola, Shibpur Upazila | 42.65 | 26.50 | R211 |
| Dhaka Division | Kishoreganj District | Bhairab | 70.38 | 43.73 | R360 |
| Chittagong Division | Brahmanbaria District | Kuttapara, Sarail Upazila | 84.71 | 52.67 | N102 |
| Chittagong Division | Brahmanbaria District | Kuttapara, Sarail Upazila | 85.52 | 53.14 | R220 |
| Sylhet Division | Habiganj District | Jagadishpur Union, Madhabpur Upazila | 115.40 | 71.71 | N204 |
| Sylhet Division | Habiganj District | Shayestaganj Upazila | 136.03 | 84.52 | R240 |
| Sylhet Division | Habiganj District | Shayestaganj Upazila | 140.30 | 87.18 | N204 |
| Sylhet Division | Habiganj District | Mirpur Union, Bahubal Upazila | 144.95 | 90.07 | N207 |
| Sylhet Division | Habiganj District | Nabiganj Upazila | 180.45 | 112.13 | R240 |
| Sylhet Division | Habiganj District | Nabiganj Upazila | 184.50 | 114.64 | R241 |
| Sylhet Division | Moulvibazar District | Sherpur, Moulvibazar Sadar Upazila | 189.61 | 117.82 | N207 |
| Sylhet Division | Sylhet District | Bishwanath Upazila | 214.38 | 133.21 | Z2016 |
| Sylhet Division | Sylhet District | Dakshin Surma Upazila | 223.86 | 139.10 | Z2013 |
| Sylhet Division | Sylhet District | Dakshin Surma Upazila | 223.90 | 139.13 | N208 |
| Sylhet Division | Sylhet District | Sylhet | 226.26 | 140.59 | N208 |
| Sylhet Division | Sylhet District | Tamabil | 280.88 | 182.42 | AH1, AH2 – Towards India |

== Significance ==
The significance of the Dhaka–Sylhet–Tamabil corridor lies in its status as the second most crucial highway in Bangladesh, serving as a vital route for regional connectivity and trade. This corridor is an integral part of the Asian Highway network. Sylhet, known for its potential in tourism and natural resources, hosts several industrial and economic zones. Expanding this highway will not only enhance trade with India's northeastern states, including Assam, but also establish sub-regional road connections and cross-border connectivity with China, Myanmar, and Bhutan.

The highway has been described as one of the most accident-prone in the country and the deadliest in the world.

== Expansion ==
A project to upgrade the two-lane Dhaka–Sylhet highway to six lanes, comprising four main lanes and two additional service lanes, was approved in February 2021, with a deadline set for December 2026. The estimated cost of the project, implemented by the Roads and Highways Department (RHD), is around ৳16918 crore (US$1.4 billion), with the Asian Development Bank (ADB) extending loan assistance of ৳13244 crore (US$1.1 billion). The total length of the road covered by the project is 209.328 kilometres (130.070 mi).

The RHD is also preparing to upgrade the 56.16-kilometre (34.90 mi) two-lane Sylhet–Tamabil highway to four lanes, including two additional service lanes. Despite approval in September 2020, delays in land acquisition and contractor selection have hindered progress. The ৳3528.24 crore (US$290 million) project is mostly funded by the Asian Infrastructure Investment Bank (AIIB), providing a loan of ৳2970.56 crore (US$240 million). Completion is expected by June 2025.
