= Masaba, Tarabo =

Coordinates: 23.750°N 90.556°E

Masaba (Bengali: মাসাব) is an area in ward 3 of the town of Tarabo, in Rupganj Upazila, Narayanganj District, Bangladesh. According to the 2011 Bangladesh census, Masaba had 1,134 households and a population of 4,896.
