= BSCIC Jamdani Village =

BSCIC Jamdani Village বিসিক জামদানি পল্লী BSCIC Town
- Industrial park
- Location in Dhaka Division BSCIC Jamdani Village (Bangladesh)
- Coordinates: 23.728398°N 90.514594°E
- Country: Bangladesh
- Division: Dhaka
- District: Narayanganj
- Upazilla: Rupganj

Languages
  - National: Bengali
- Time zone: UTC+6:00 (BST)
- PIN code: 1463

BSCIC Jamdani Industrial Estate & Research Center is a weaving village in Narayanganj District of Bangladesh. It is popularly known as "Jamdani Palli", as it is used as an industrial estate for weaving Jamdani clothing.

== Location ==
The village, situated in Noapara, Tarabo, Narayanganj District, is located 3 km (1.9 mi) north from the bridge of Kanchpur, the capital of Bangladesh, and 30 km (19 mi) from Dhaka. One needs to use N2 highway to access the village.

== History ==
The village was established on 20 acre land by Bangladesh Small and Cottage Industries Corporation as "BSCIC Jamdani Industrial Estate & Research Center" at a cost of ৳6 crore in 1991. In 2020 and 2021, the weavers of the village faced financial losses due to the inability to sell Jamdani due to the COVID-19 epidemic. In 2022, Jamdani village started selling clothes again. In 2021, the government decided to establish a museum, an exhibition and sales center and a fashion design institute in the Jamdani Village.

== Industry and market ==
Weaving jamdani at BSCIC Jamdani Village

416 plots were developed in the industrial park out of which 407 plots are currently allotted to weavers. The weavers working in the allotted plots live in this village and numbered 1,600 as of 2023. Here weavers make ready-made garments from jamdani without the help of machinery. Every Friday there is a temporary market in this Jamdani Village where clothes can be bought at wholesale prices. There are total 480 handlooms in this village.

== Issue ==
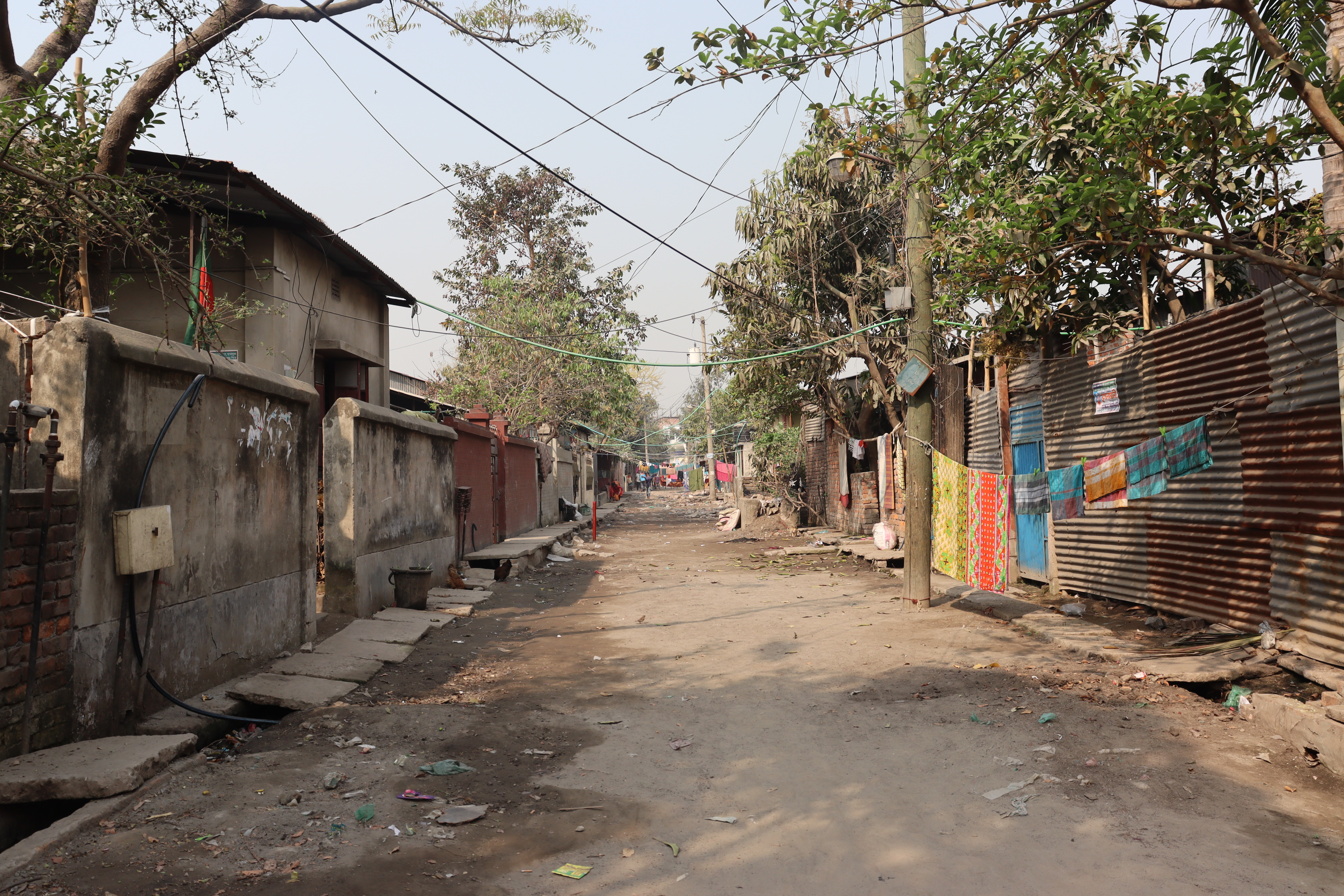
A road in the village

Most of the approach roads to Jamdani Village are in poor condition. Although this situation prevailed for a long time, the concerned authorities did not take any measures to solve the issue. It is alleged that weavers working in village looms are paid less than their due wages. Besides, some unscrupulous groups have set up commercial establishments in exchange of looms by allotting plots in this village in exchange of bribes. Besides, the income of the looms has decreased as a result of fake jamdani sarees imported from India.

== Gallery ==
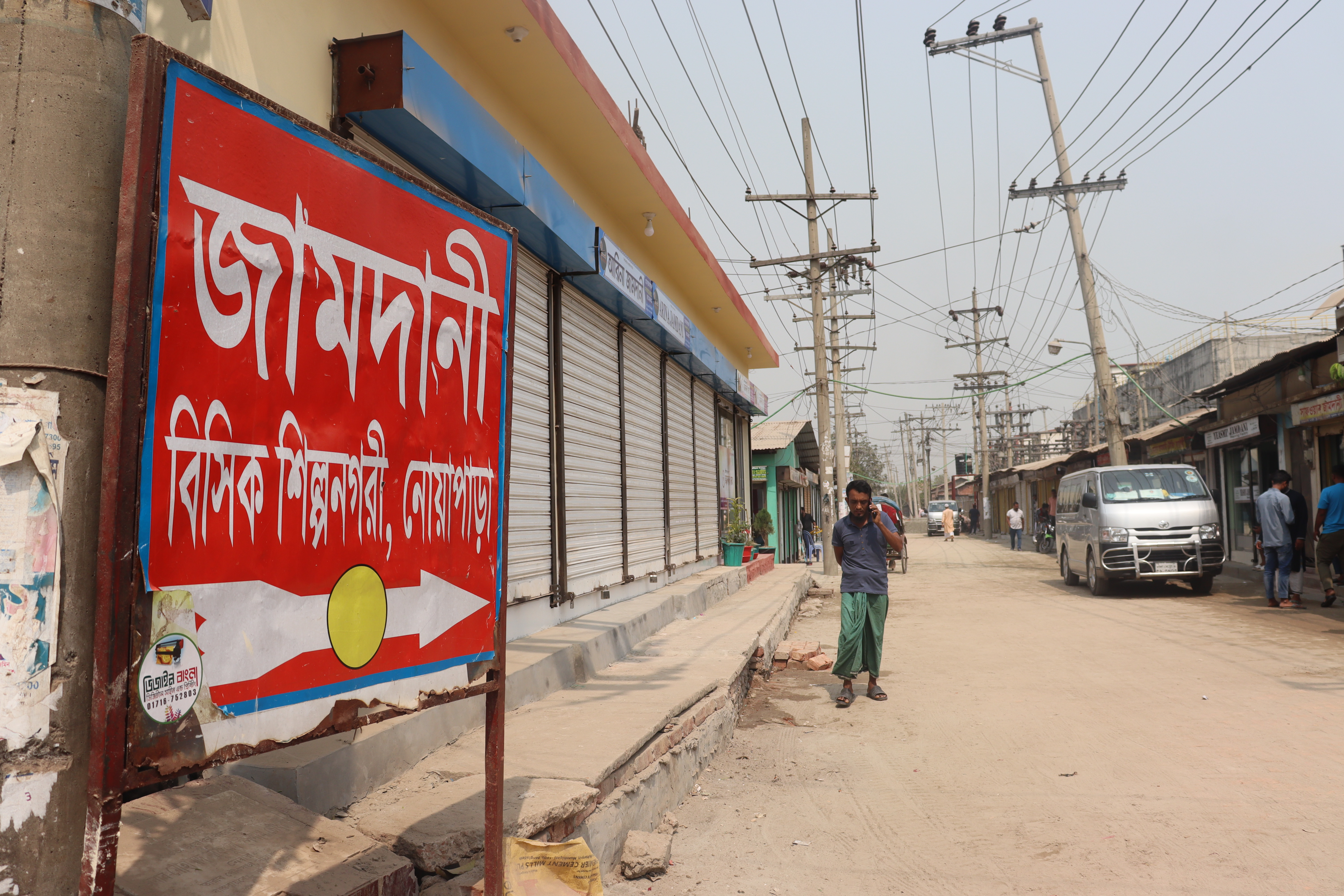
A access road of the village

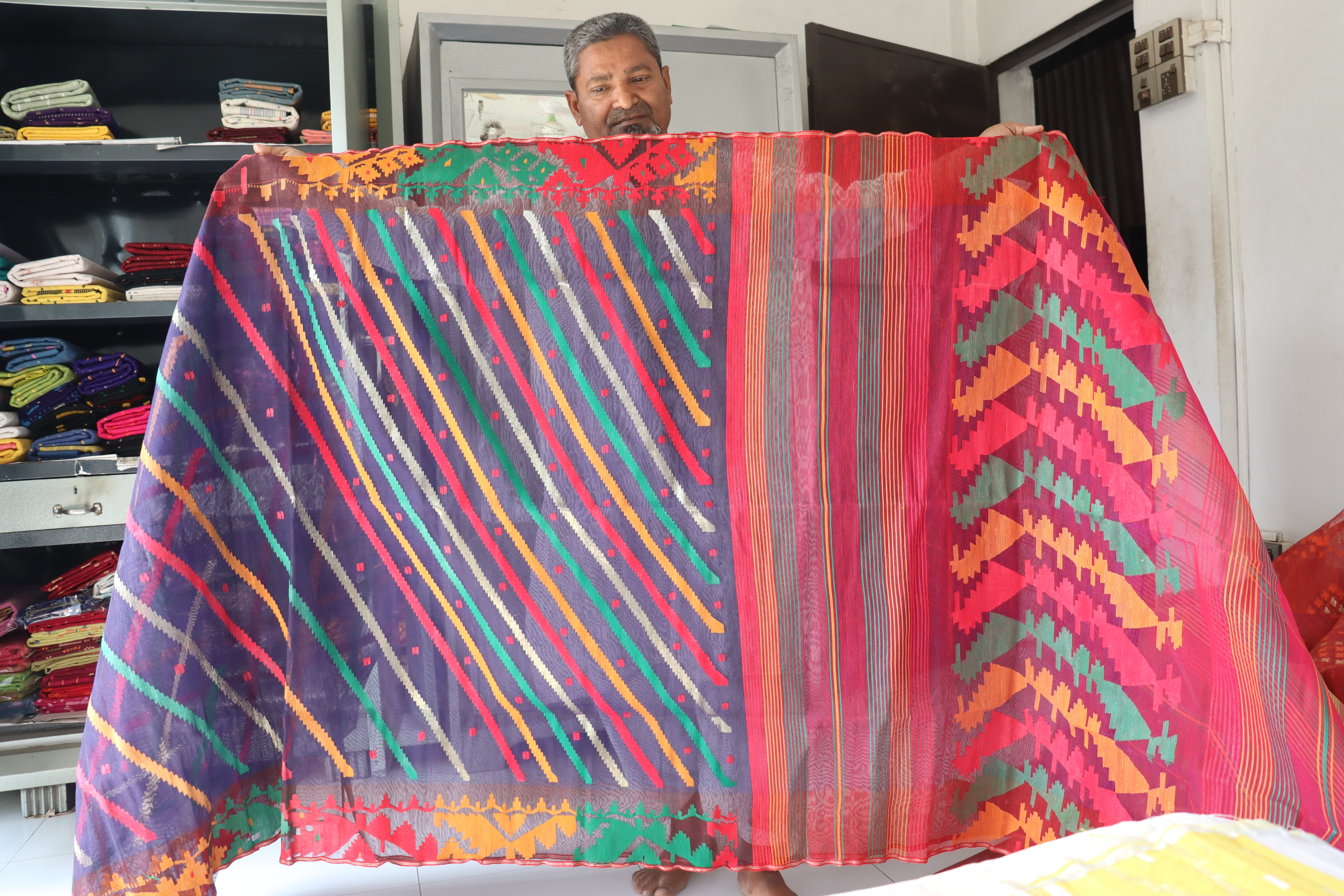
A jamdani shop in the village

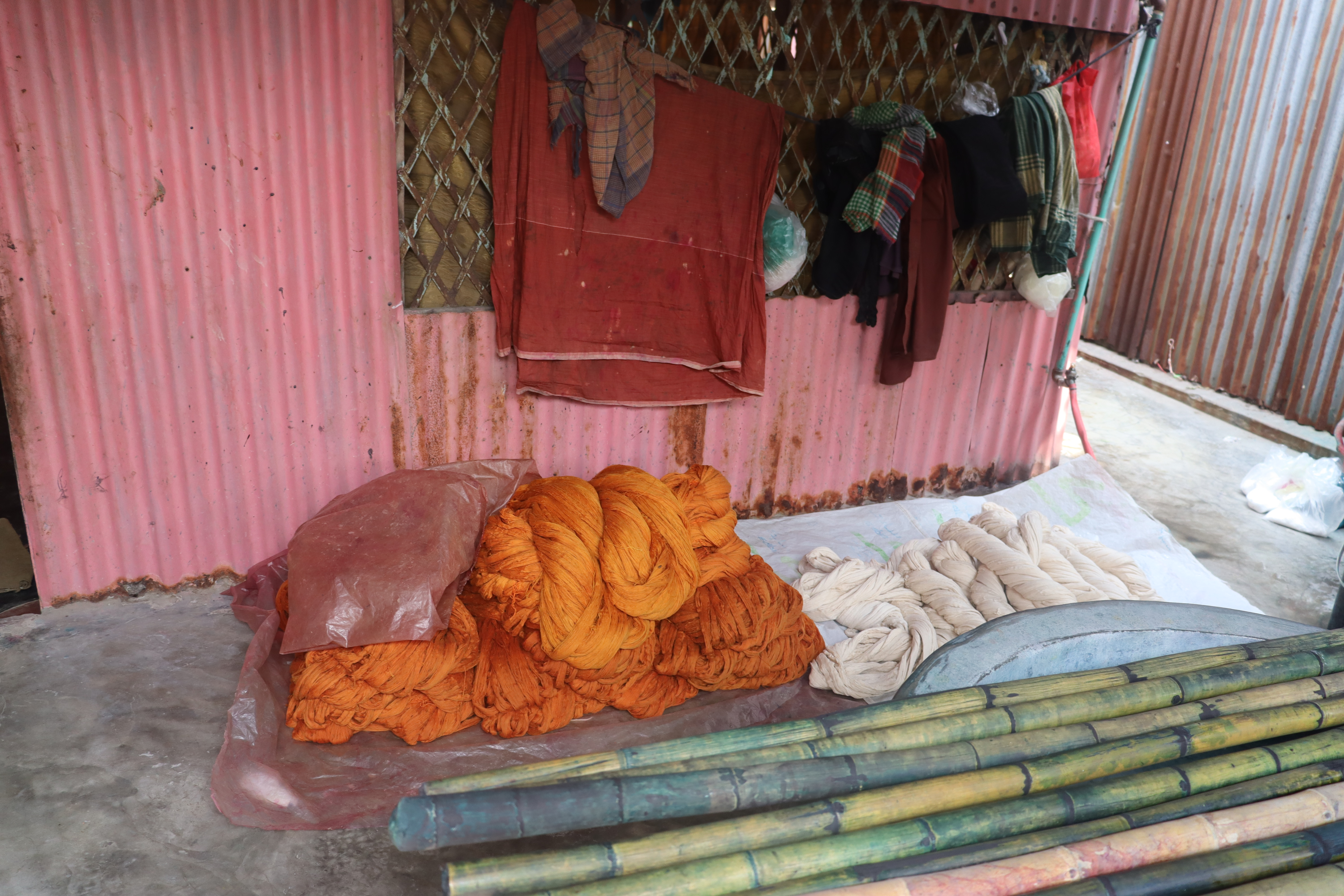
Dyeing process

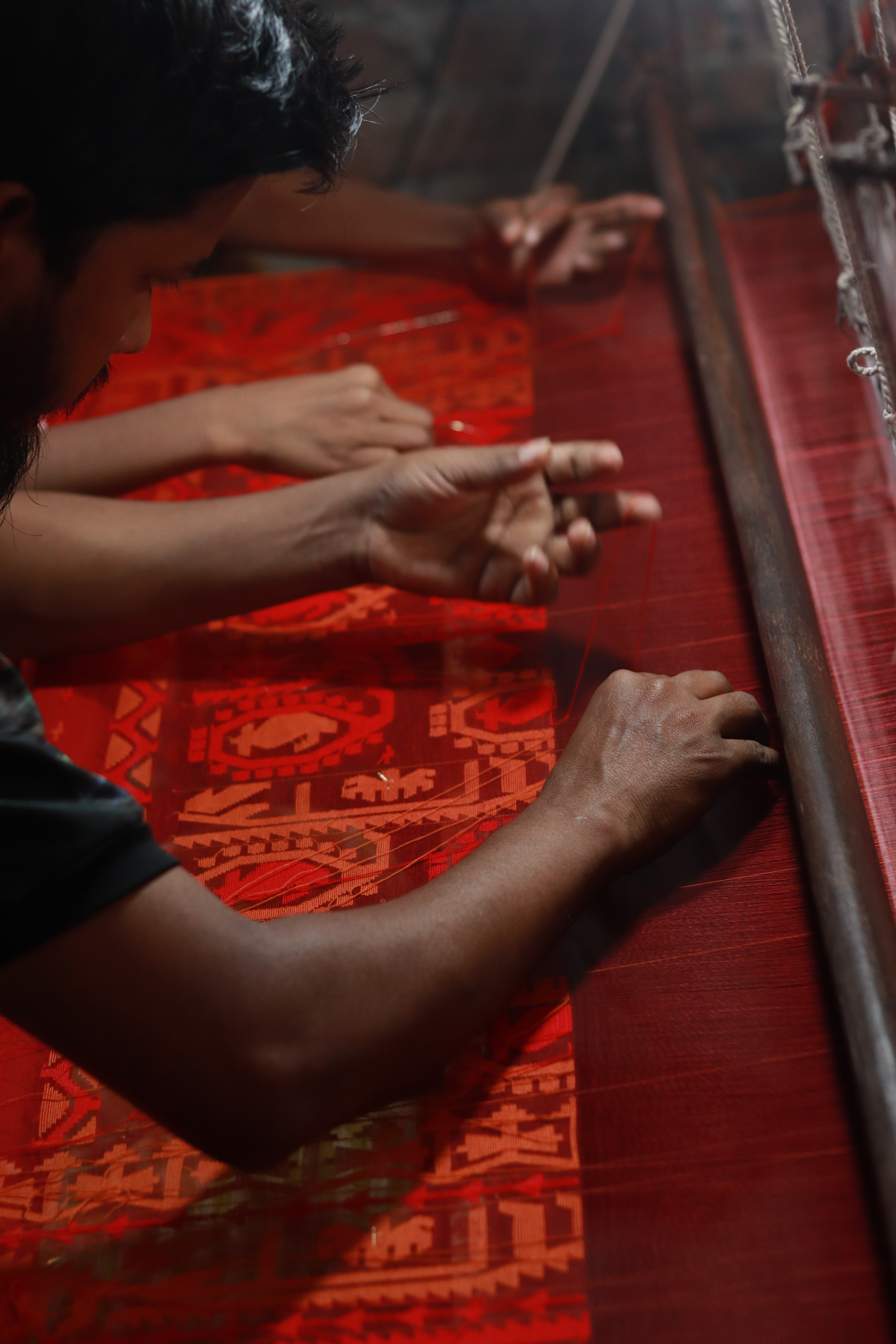
Jamdani weaving in a loom of the village

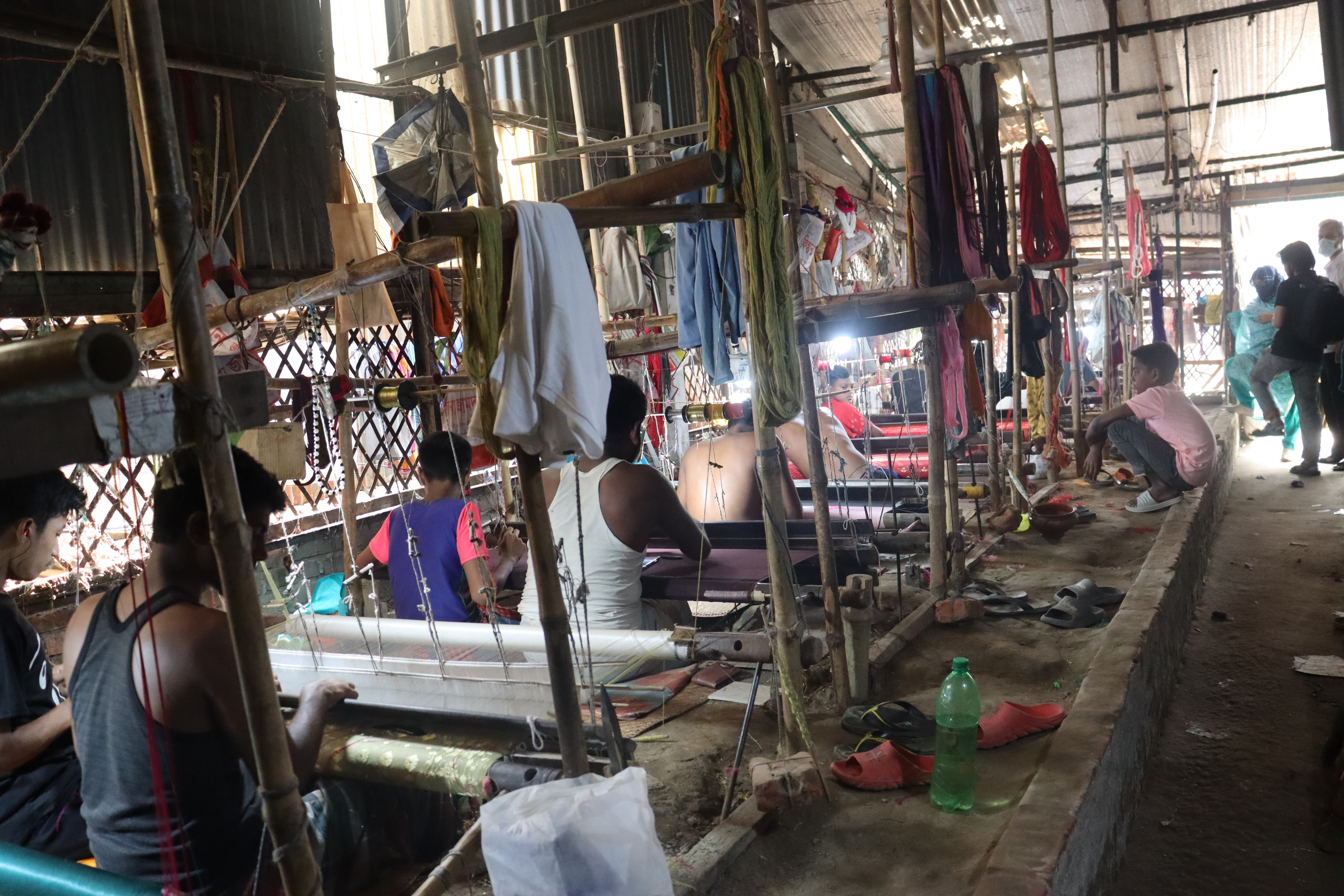
A loom in the village
