= Bholaba Union =

- Union
- Location in Bangladesh
- Country: Narayanganj Bangladesh
- Division: Dhaka Division
- District: Narayanganj District
- Upazilas: Rupganj Upazila

Area
  - Total: 17.2 km^{2} (6.6 sq mi)

Population (2001)
  - Total: 32,219
- Time zone: UTC+6 (BST)

Bholaba Union is a union, the smallest administrative body of Bangladesh, located in Rupganj Upazila, Narayanganj District, Bangladesh. The total population is 32,219.
