= Murapara Rajbari =

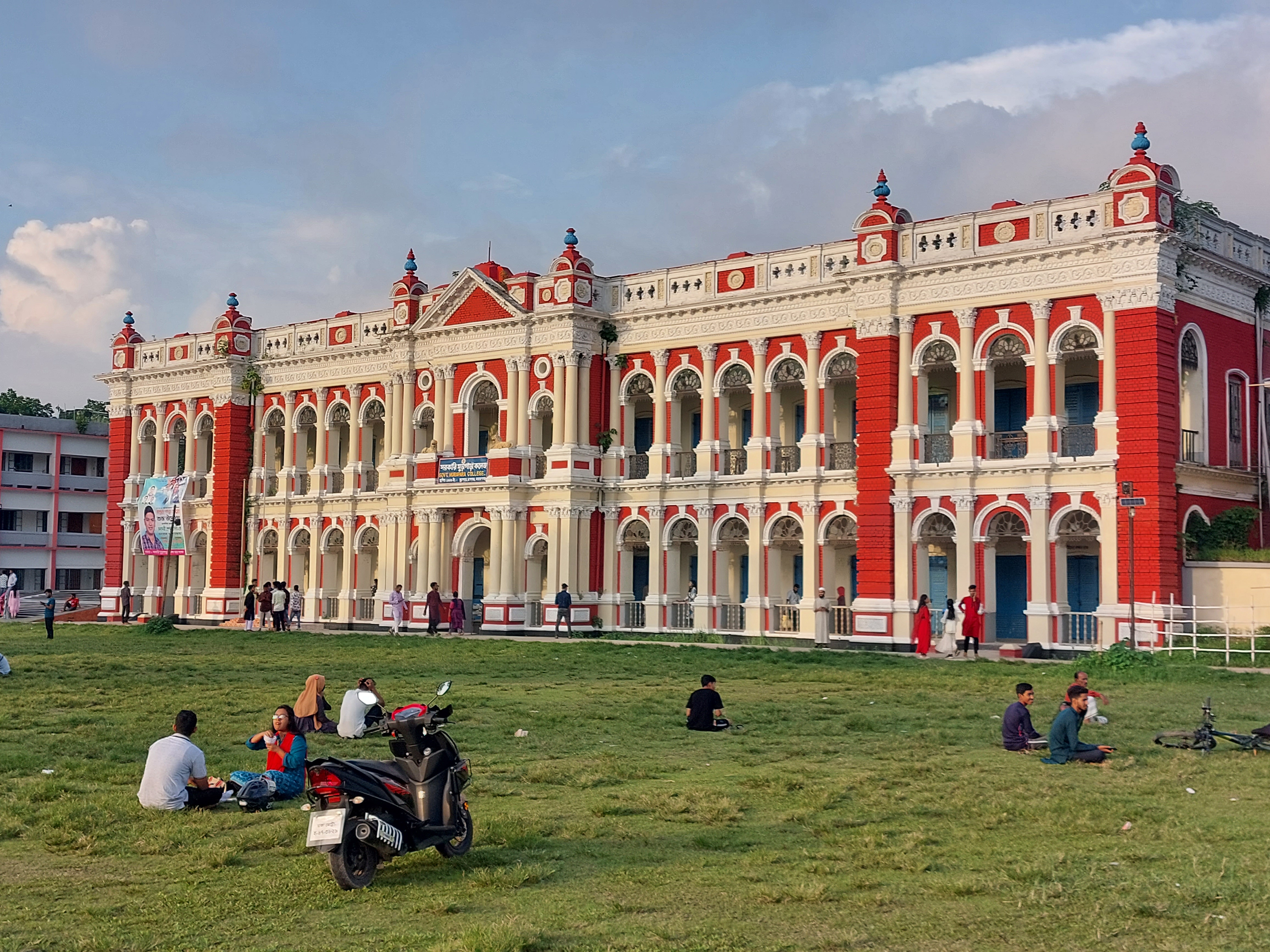
- Pictured in 2025
- Interactive map of the Murapara Rajbari area

General information
- Architectural style: Mix of Indo-Saracenic Revival architecture and Bengali architecture
- Location: Narayanganj, Bangladesh
- Coordinates: 23.7837°N 90.5231°E

Murapara Rajbari is a well known palace in Rupganj Upazila of Narayanganj District, Bangladesh. The palace is situated in Murapara village, about 25 km southeast of Dhaka on the Narsindghi road. It is connected 5 km stretch of bumpy brick-paved feeder road on the west of main Dhaka- Sylhet trunk road.

== History ==
"Murapara Rajbari" is one of the examples of such activity of an affluent community located in Murapara village, about 25 kilometres southeast of Dhaka on the western side of the Dhaka-Narsingdi road. The Murapara Jomidarbari/Palace was established by the founder of the Murapara Raj family named Ramratan Banerjee. He was appointed as treasurer of the Natore estate and rose to a high position and acquired large properties by dint of his honesty. One source says it was Ramratan Banarjee who constructed the palace in 1889 but the other source says he just established the basement of the structure. It was Protap Chandra Banarjee who left his old traditional house and made new palace behind the old one in 1889.

== Architecture ==
The two-storey picturesque palace is rectangular in plan and has a grand frontage facing west of about 200 feet long. A 10 feet wide verandah runs in front of the palace at both levels, providing access to the rooms. The depth of the verandah is used as a shading device from the western sun. It has semicircular arches. The areas in the arches are filled with cast iron tracery decorated with green, red and blue glasses, so that the floor of the verandah demonstrates as a colorful mosaic pattern by casting shadow from the sun.

== See also ==
- Somapura Mahavihara
- Kantajew Temple
- Shahbaz Khan Mosque
- Shona Mosque
- Bagha Mosque
- Chawk Mosque
- Khan Mohammad Mridha Mosque
- Sixty Dome Mosque
- Saat Masjid
- Lalbagh Fort
