= Rupganj Union =

- Union
- Country: Narayanganj Bangladesh
- Division: Dhaka Division
- District: Narayanganj District
- Upazilas: Rupganj Upazila

Area
  - Total: 29.2 km^{2} (11.3 sq mi)

Population (2001)
  - Total: 44,013
- Time zone: UTC+6 (BST)

Rupganj Union is a union parishad, the smallest administrative body of Bangladesh, located in Rupganj Upazila, Narayanganj District, Bangladesh. The total population is 44,013.
