= Mura Para Union =

- Union
- Country: Narayanganj Bangladesh
- Division: Dhaka Division
- District: Narayanganj District
- Upazilas: Rupganj Upazila

Area
  - Total: 8.7 km^{2} (3.4 sq mi)

Population (2001)
  - Total: 27,009
- Time zone: UTC+6 (BST)

Mura Para Union is a union, the smallest administrative body of Bangladesh, located in Rupganj Upazila, Narayanganj District, Bangladesh. The total population is 27,009.
