= Zinda Park =

Park in Narayanganj, Bangladesh

- Oikotan Eco Resort
- জিন্দা পার্ক
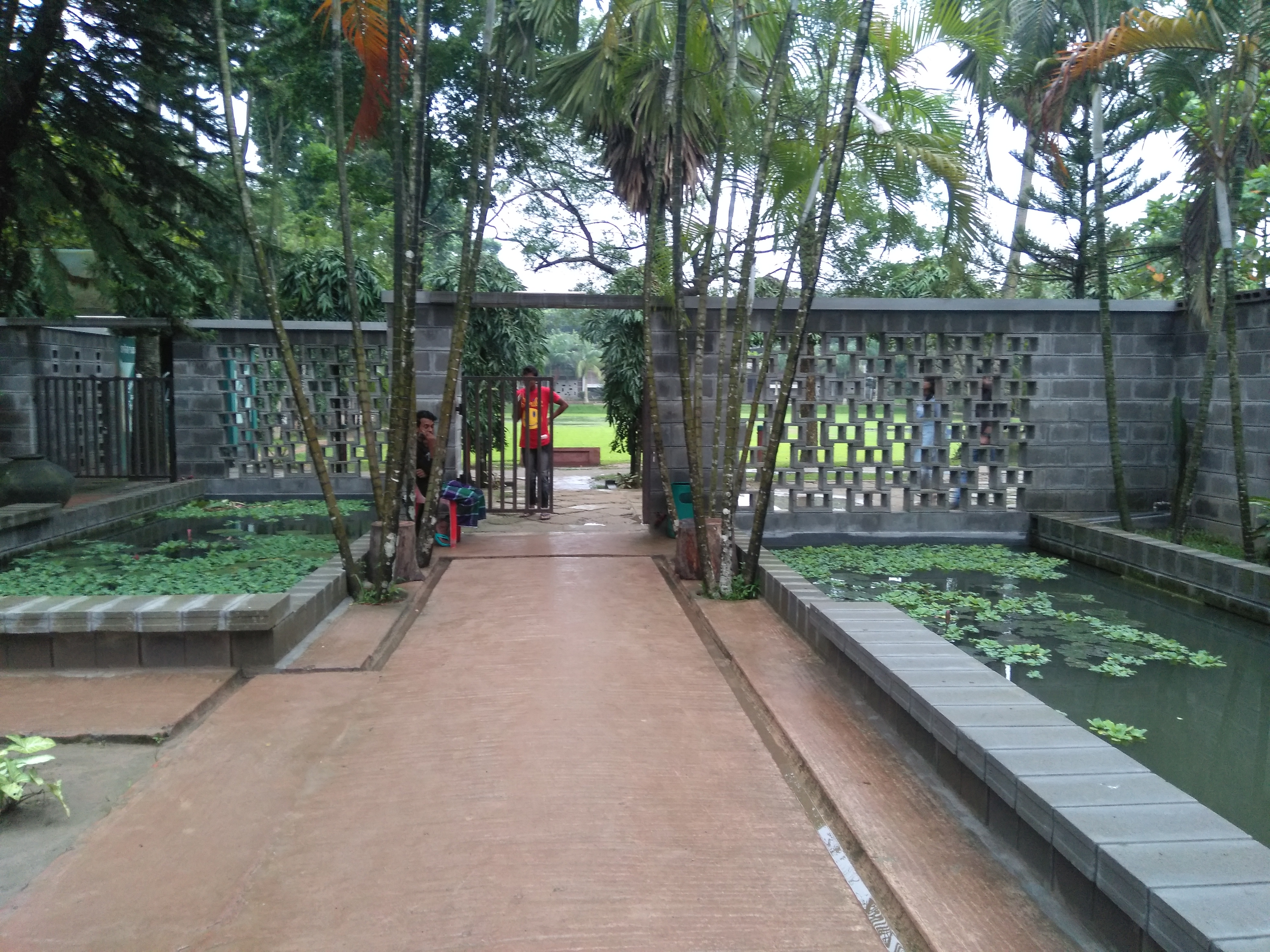
- Inside of the park
- Interactive map of Zinda Park
- Type: Vacation Center
- Location: Dawudpur union, Rupganj Upazila, Narayanganj District
- Nearest city: Purbachal
- Coordinates: 23.8660423°N 90.5103741°E
- Area: 33 acres (0.13 square kilometres)
- Created: 1981
- Operator: Agrapathik Palli Samity (1981-1993, 2014-present); RAJUK (1993-2014)
- Visitors: 70-80 (as of 2018)
- Website: zindapark.com

Zinda Park or Oikotan Eco Resort is an amusement park and leisure center located in Narayanganj District of Bangladesh. The area of the park is 33 acres. The park is a tourist attraction of Narayanganj district.

== Location ==
Zinda Park is located in Daudpur Union, Rupganj Upazila, Narayanganj District, Bangladesh. The park is located along the Dhaka Bypass Expressway in the north-east corner of Purbachal, a new satellite town 37 km from the capital Dhaka. A small lake surrounds it to the north and east of the park.

== History ==
"Agrapathik Palli Samity", formerly "Augnibina Students Forum", started in 1980. The park was established in 1981 under the initiative of this organization. The area of the park is 100 bighas, of which 60 bighas were provided by Tabarak Hossain Kusum. It was initially named Shantikanan, later renamed Zinda Park. Work began with the establishment of a school and offices. Libraries, sanatoriums, mosques, etc. were gradually built.

In 1995, Rajuk acquired the Zinda Park area for its Purbachal project. After that, there were several attempts at encroachment and resistance between Rajdhani Unnayan Kartripakkha and the natives. The matter is also taken into consideration. Eventually RAJUK put up a signboard reading Owned by RAJUK/Established and managed by 'Agrapathik Kalyan Samity', Protests erupted on 27 February 2014 when the police tried to evict people from Zinda Park. Zinda Park was then named "Rajuk Zinda Park". The same year Agrapathika Palli Samiti again acquired the park area and renamed it Zinda Park.

== Description ==
Zinda Park is situated over about 33 acres land. There are 20-25 thousand trees of about 250 species. The 25 percent of the park covers five reservoirs. There are tree-houses, dunes, flower gardens and bridges over lakes. Besides, the samity also established several buildings on the park area including schools, mosques, libraries, cottages, offices, etc.

== Gallery ==
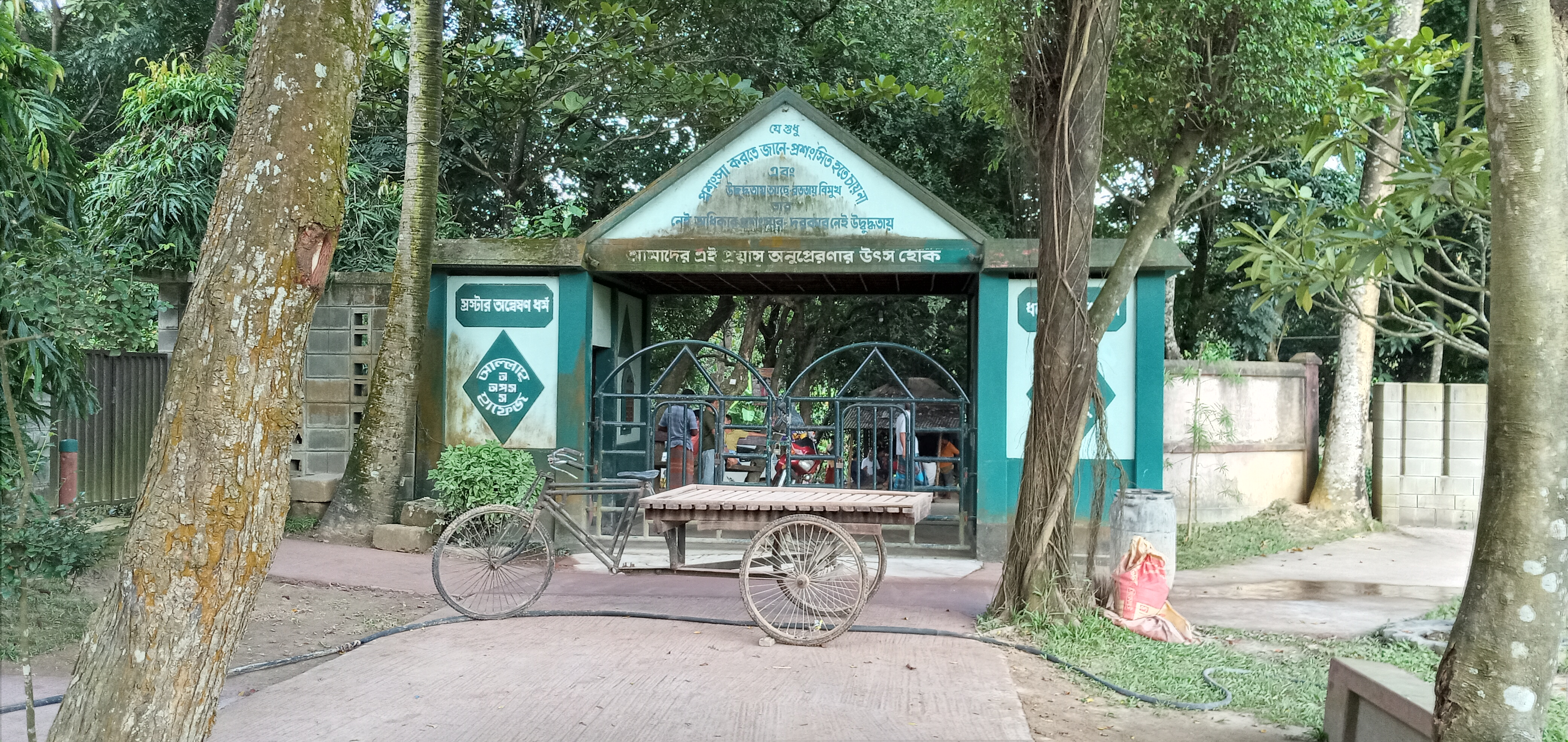
Entrance of Zinda Park

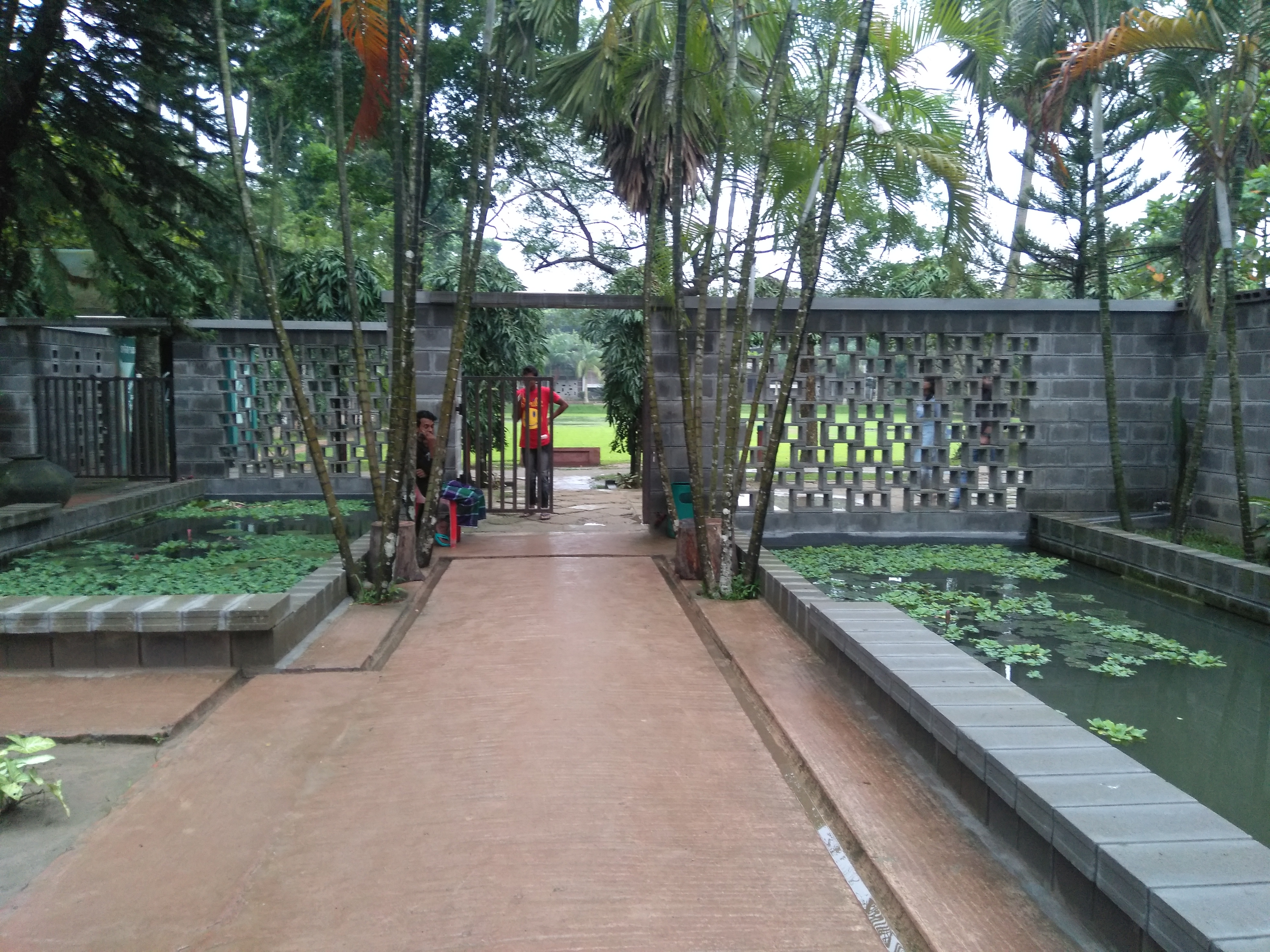
Main entrance way

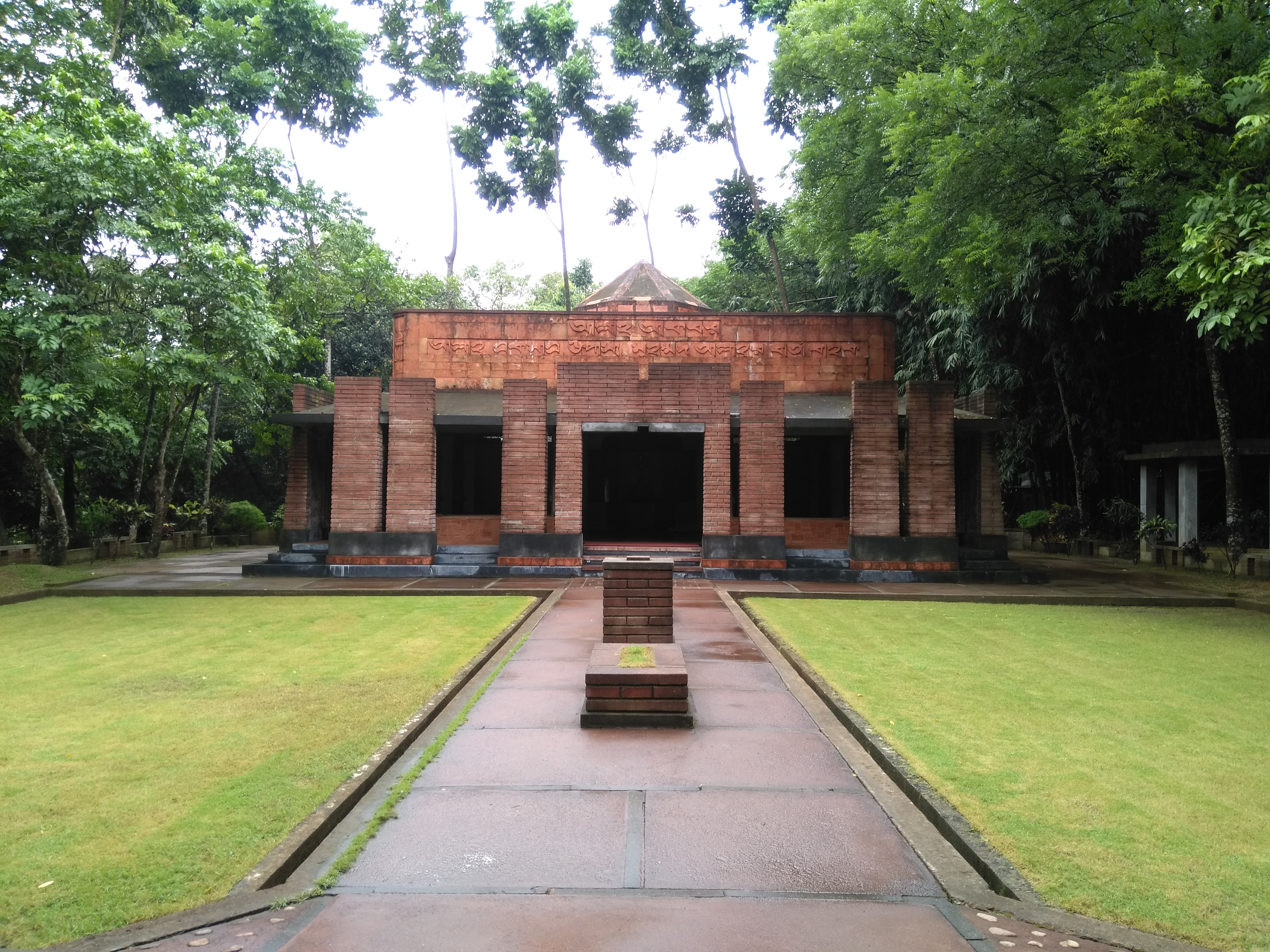
Mosque

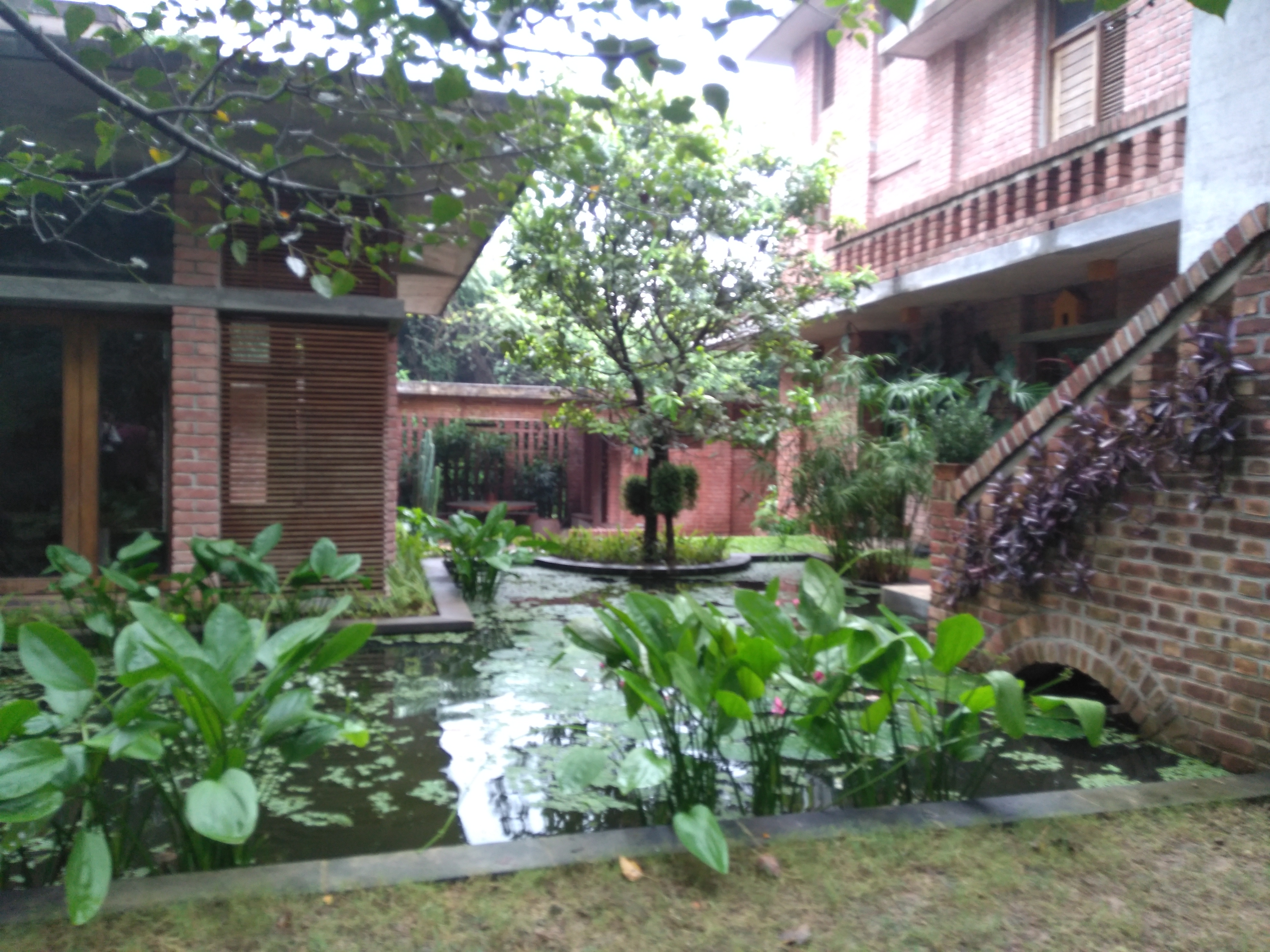
Guest house

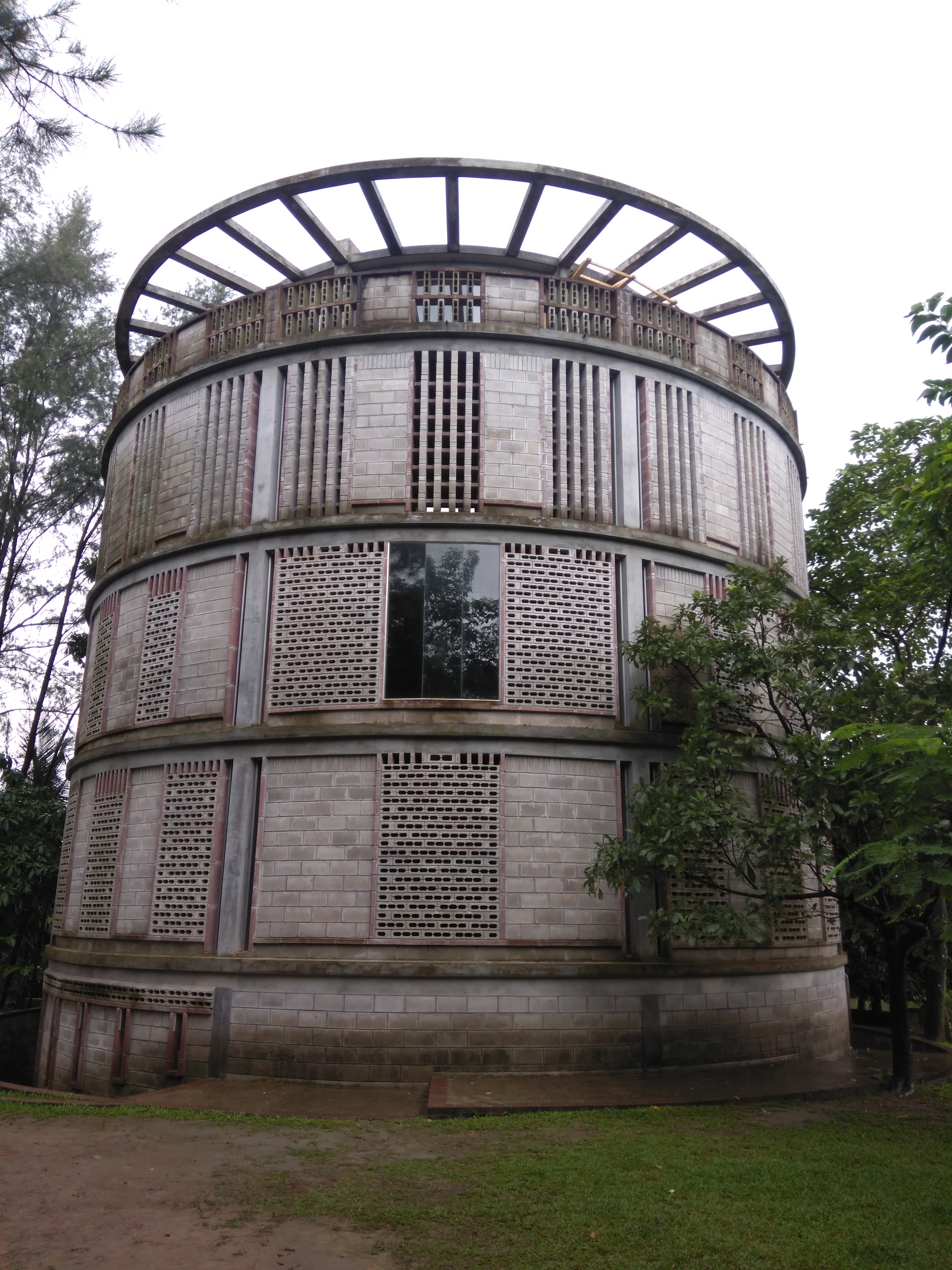
Library

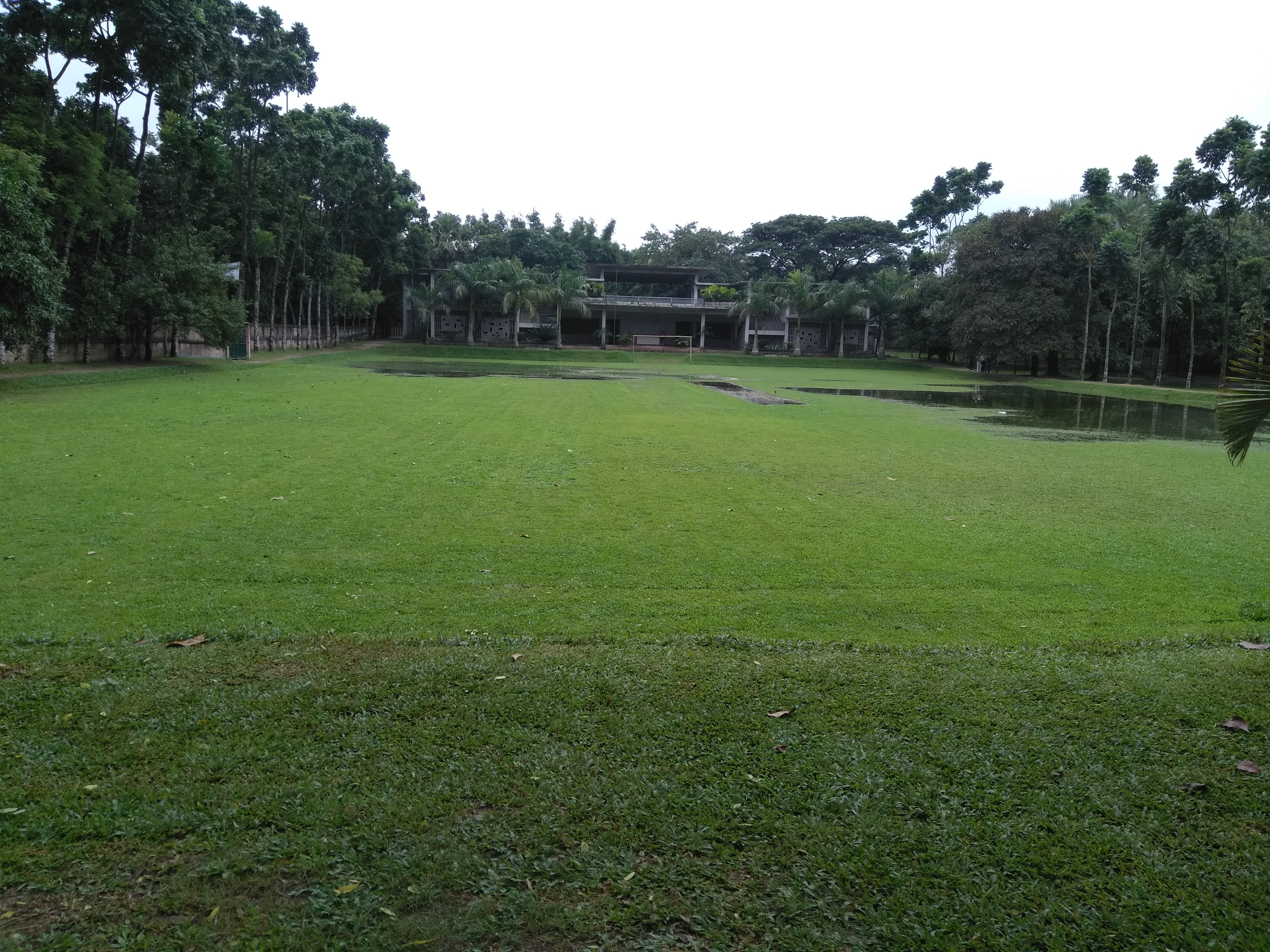
School and garden

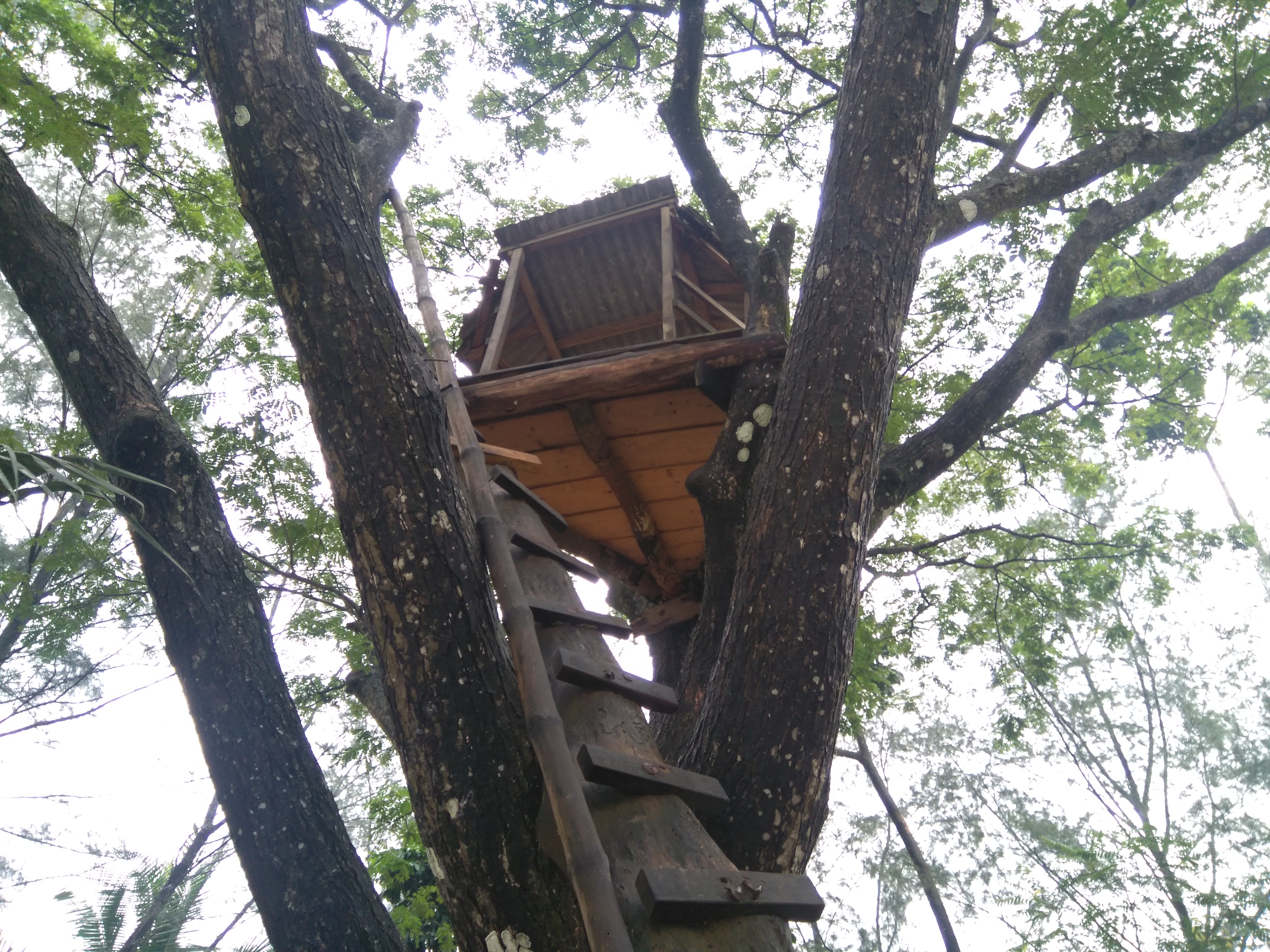
Tree house

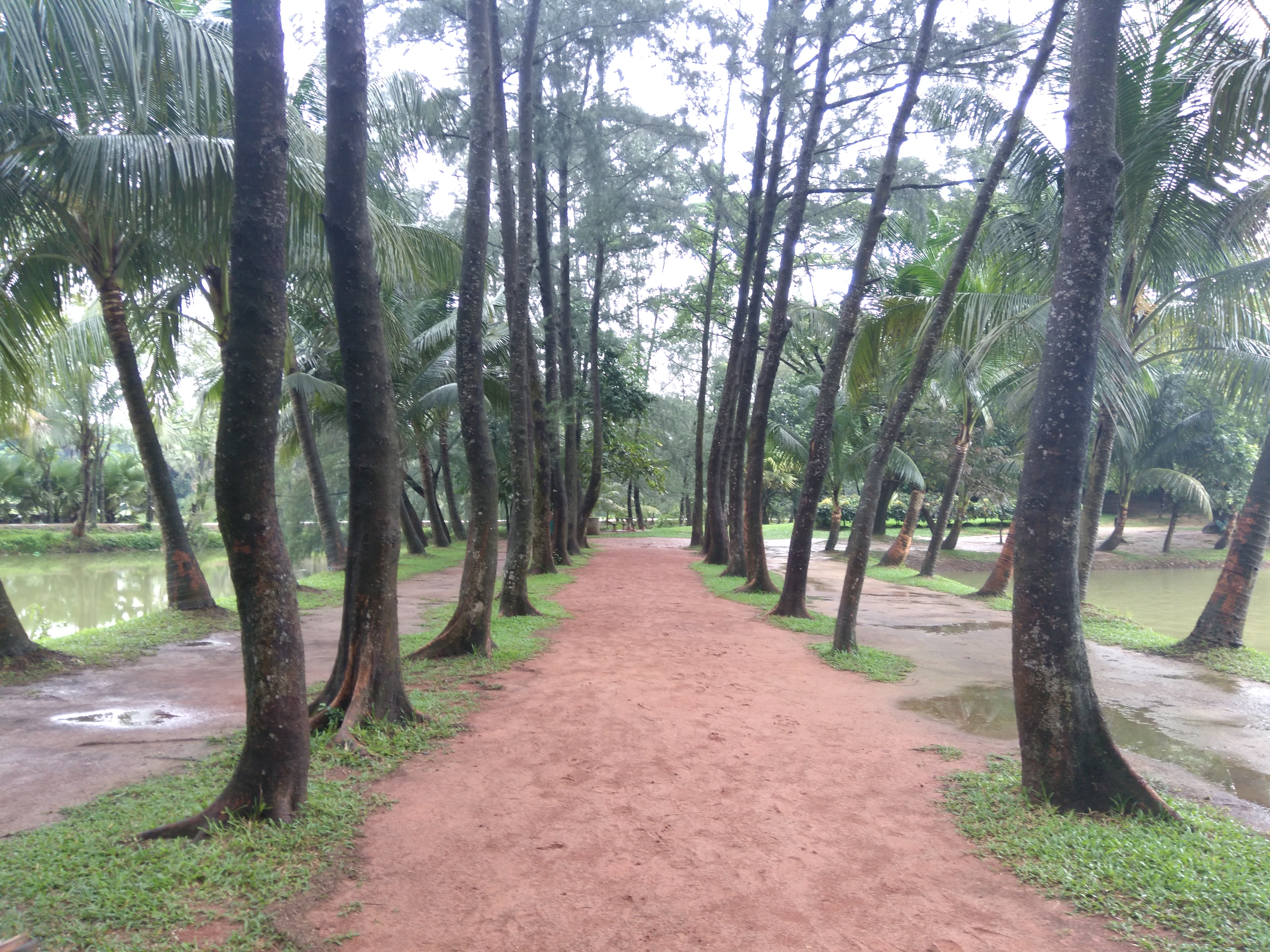
Trees

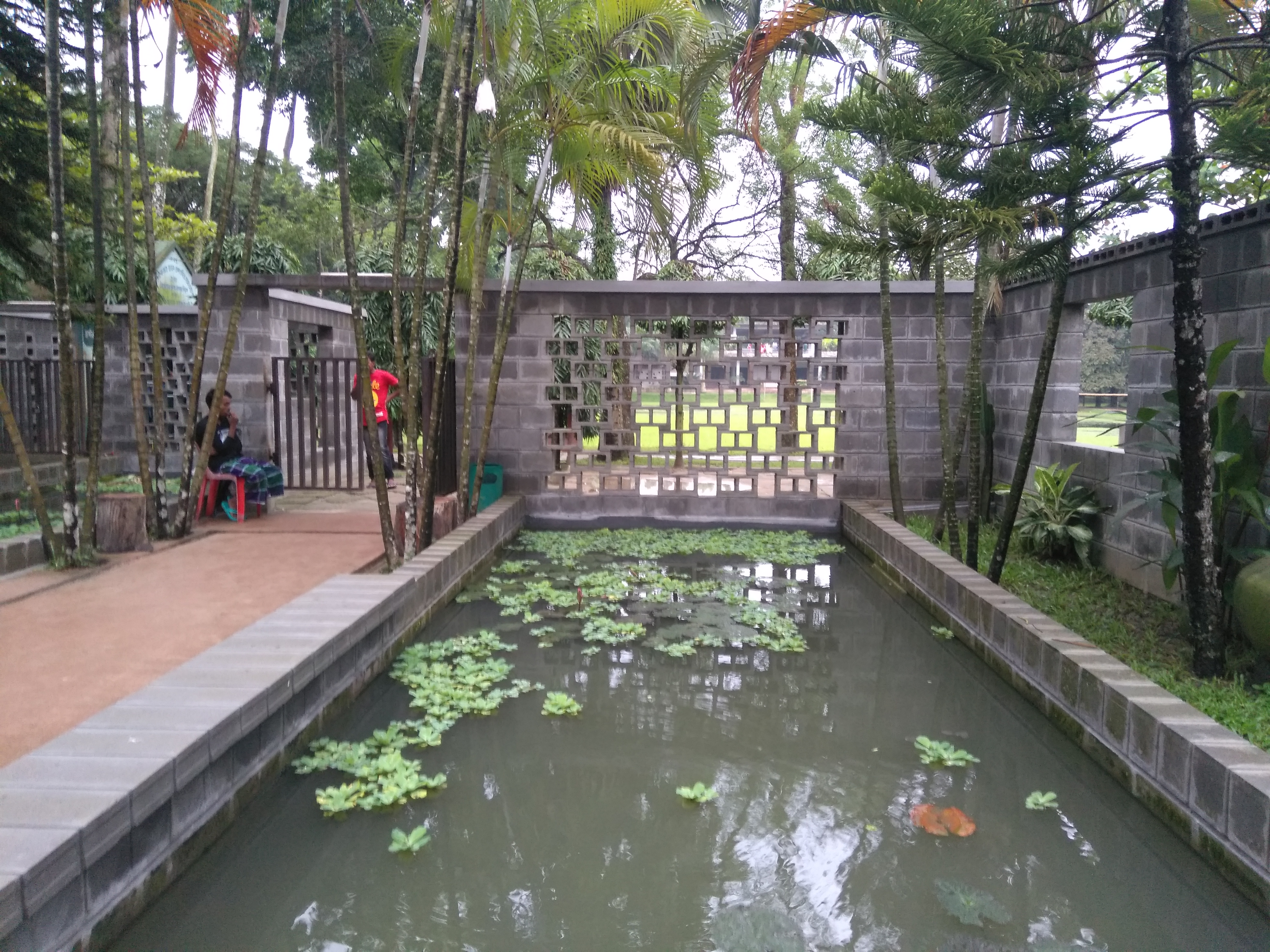
Artificial reservoirs along the way

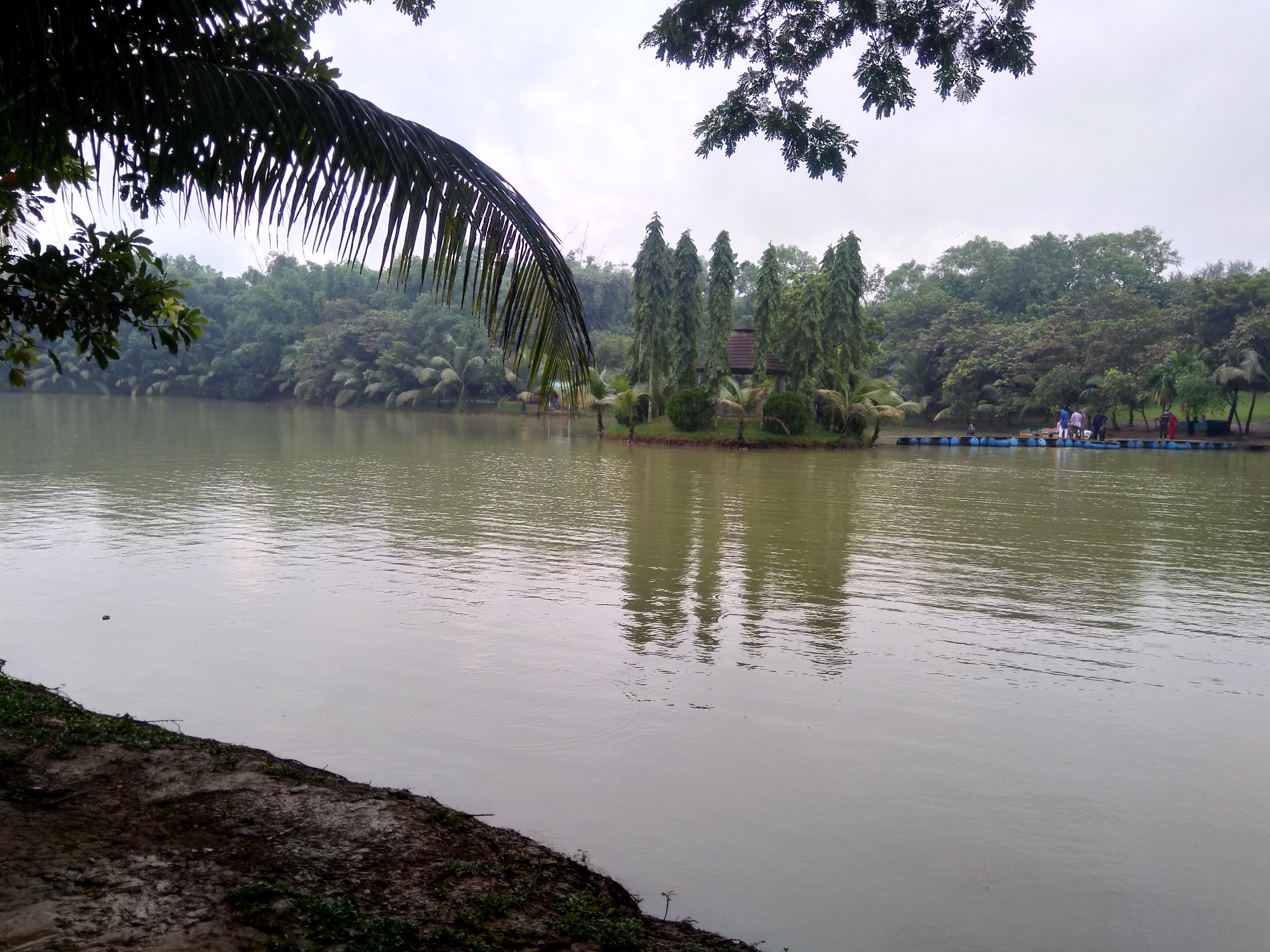
Lake
