= Golakandail Union =

- Union
- Country: Narayanganj Bangladesh
- Division: Dhaka Division
- District: Narayanganj District
- Upazilas: Rupganj Upazila

Area
  - Total: 18.5 km^{2} (7.1 sq mi)

Population (2001)
  - Total: 28,440
- Time zone: UTC+6 (BST)

Golakandail Union is a union, the smallest administrative body of Bangladesh, located in Rupganj Upazila, Narayanganj District, Bangladesh. The total population is 28,440.
