= Fultali (village) =

Fultali ফুলতলী
- Village
- Interactive map of Fultali
- Coordinates: 23.55°N 91.05°E
- Country: Bangladesh
- Division: Chittagong Division
- District: Comilla District
- Upazila: Debidwar

Government
  - Chairman: Md Shirajul islam sarkar
  - Member: Md Shohidullah & azad

Area
  - Total: 5.5 km^{2} (2.1 sq mi)

Population (2011)
  - Total: 3,459
  - Density: 630/km^{2} (1,600/sq mi)
- Time zone: UTC+6 (BST)
- Postal code: 3531
- Website: elahabadup.comilla.gov.bd

Fultali (Bengali: ফুলতলী) is a village in Elahabad Union of Debidwar Upazila, Comilla District, Bangladesh. It is situated 1–2 kilometres (0.62–1.24 mi) southwest of the Gumti River and the Comilla-Sylhet Highway. According to the census of 2011, the population of the village was 3,482.
