= Daudpur Bazar Union =

Daudpur Union Parishad Daudpur Union
- Union
- Country: Narayanganj Bangladesh
- Division: Dhaka Division
- District: Narayanganj District
- Upazilas: Rupganj Upazila

Government
  - Ex Chairman: Md Nurul Islam

Area
  - Total: 27.8 km^{2} (10.7 sq mi)

Population (2001)
  - Total: 39,683
- Time zone: UTC+6 (BST)

Daudpur Union Parishad is a union parishad, the smallest administrative body of Bangladesh, located in Rupganj Upazila, Narayanganj District, Bangladesh. The total population is 39,683.
