= Bulta Union =

- Union
- Country: Narayanganj Bangladesh
- Division: Dhaka Division
- District: Narayanganj District
- Upazilas: Rupganj Upazila

Area
  - Total: 9.6 km^{2} (3.7 sq mi)

Population (2001)
  - Total: 32,182
- Time zone: UTC+6 (BST)

Bulta Union is a union, the smallest administrative body of Bangladesh, located in Rupganj Upazila, Narayanganj District, Bangladesh. The total population is 32,182.
