= N207 =

N207 may refer to:

- Congressman Andres Acop Cosalan Road, a Philippine national road signed as N207
- London Buses route N207, a night bus route in London
