= N102 (Bangladesh) =

National Highway in Bangladesh

N102
- Comilla-Sylhet Highway

Route information
- Length: 82 km (51 mi)

Major junctions
- From: Sarail (Connecting with N2)
- To: Mainamati (Connecting with N1)

Location
- Country: Bangladesh

Highway system
- Roads in Bangladesh

The N102 is a main transportation artery in Bangladesh, between Comilla and Brahmanbaria. It connects Chittagong Division to Sylhet Division. The highway is known along various stretches as the Comilla-Sylhet Highway.

== The highway ==
The highway, connecting the Comilla and Brahmanbaria districts of Chittagong Division, runs approximately 82 km (51 mi) from Sarail, an upazila in the Brahmanbaria district, to Mainamati, of Comilla.

The highway cuts through the Burichang, Brahmanpara upazila in Comilla district and Kasba, Brahmanbaria Sadar and Sarail upazila in Brahmanbaria district.

=== Brahmanbaria section ===
At 41 kilometres (25 mi) in length, the Brahmanbaria section of the highway starts in Sarail biswa road crossing (Connecting with N2).

=== Comilla section ===
At 41 kilometres (25 mi) in length, the Comilla section of the highway starts in Makimpur in Brahmanpara Upazila.
