= Tarabo =

Municipality in Dhaka Division, Bangladesh

Tarabo তারাবো
- Municipality
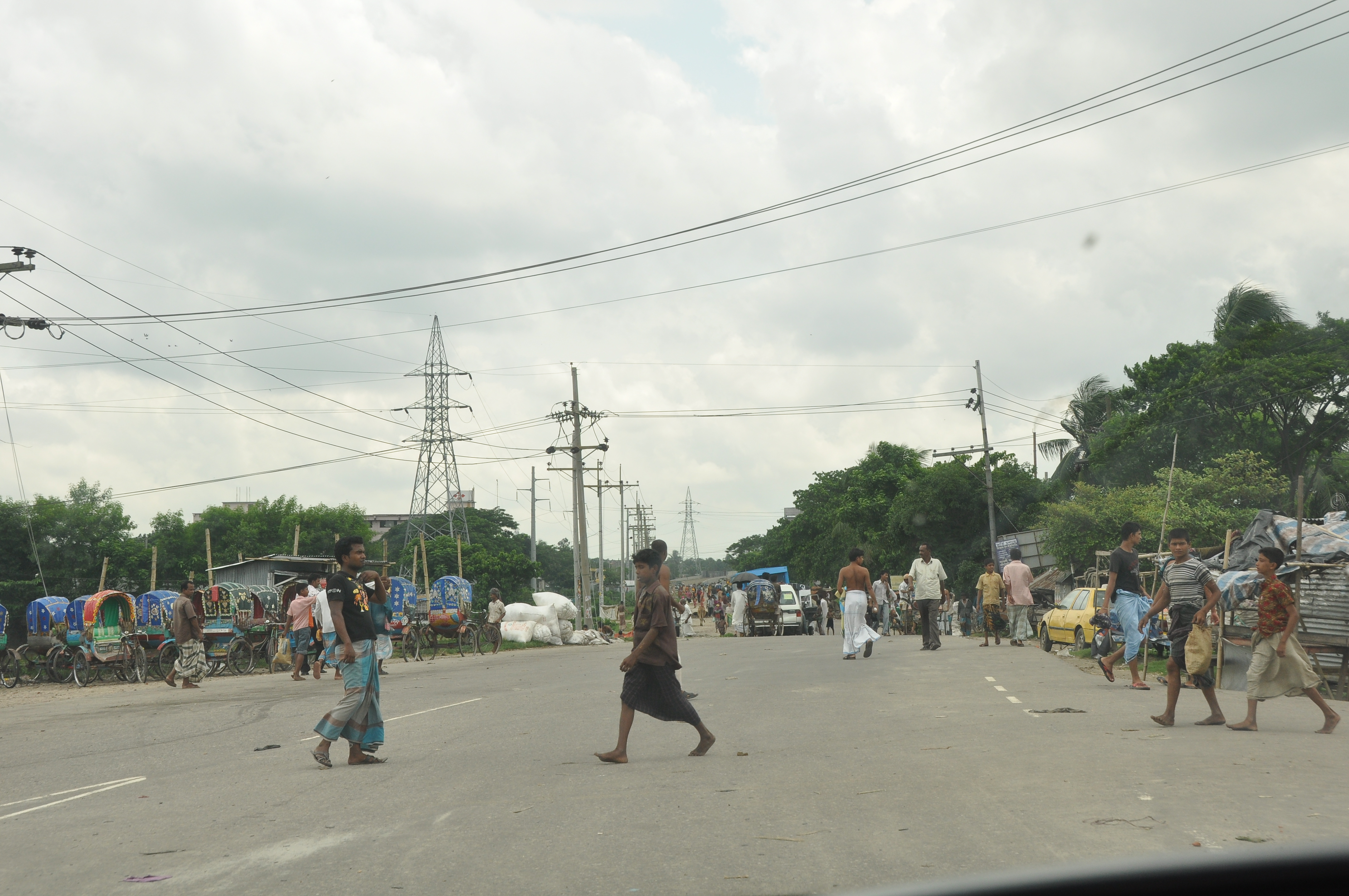
- Tarabo-Demraghat Road within the city

- Location within Dhaka division Location within Bangladesh
- Coordinates: 23°43′23″N 90°30′25″E
- Country: Bangladesh
- Division: Dhaka
- District: Narayanganj
- Upazila: Rupganj

Government
  - Type: Municipal corporation
- Elevation: 6 m (20 ft)

Population (2022)
  - Total: 197,658
- Time zone: UTC+6 (BST)
- Postal code: 1460

Tarabo Municipality mahallah geocode map

Tarabo (Bengali: তারাবো) is a municipal city in Rupganj Upazila in Narayanganj District, Bangladesh. The city has a population of 197,658. Which makes it the 25th largest city in Bangladesh. BSCIC Industrial Town and Research Centre is located at Tarabo municipality.

== Demographics ==
Religions in Tarabo Paurashava (2022)
Religion	Percent
Islam	95.54%
Hinduism	4.38%
Other or not stated	0.08%

According to the 2022 Bangladesh census, Tarabo Paurashava had 57,045 households and a population of 197,672. Tarabo had a literacy rate of 77.54%: 79.33% for males and 75.53% for females, and a sex ratio of 111.00 males per 100 females. 8.76% of the population was under 5 years of age.

According to the 2011 Bangladesh census, Tarabo city had 38,612 households and a population of 150,709. 29,826 (19.79%) were under 10 years of age. Tarabo had a literacy rate (age 7 and over) of 57.66%, compared to the national average of 51.8%, and had 69,621 females for a sex ratio of 859 females per 1000 males.

== See also ==
- List of cities and towns in Bangladesh
