= Rupganj Upazila =

Rupganj রূপগঞ্জ
- Upazila
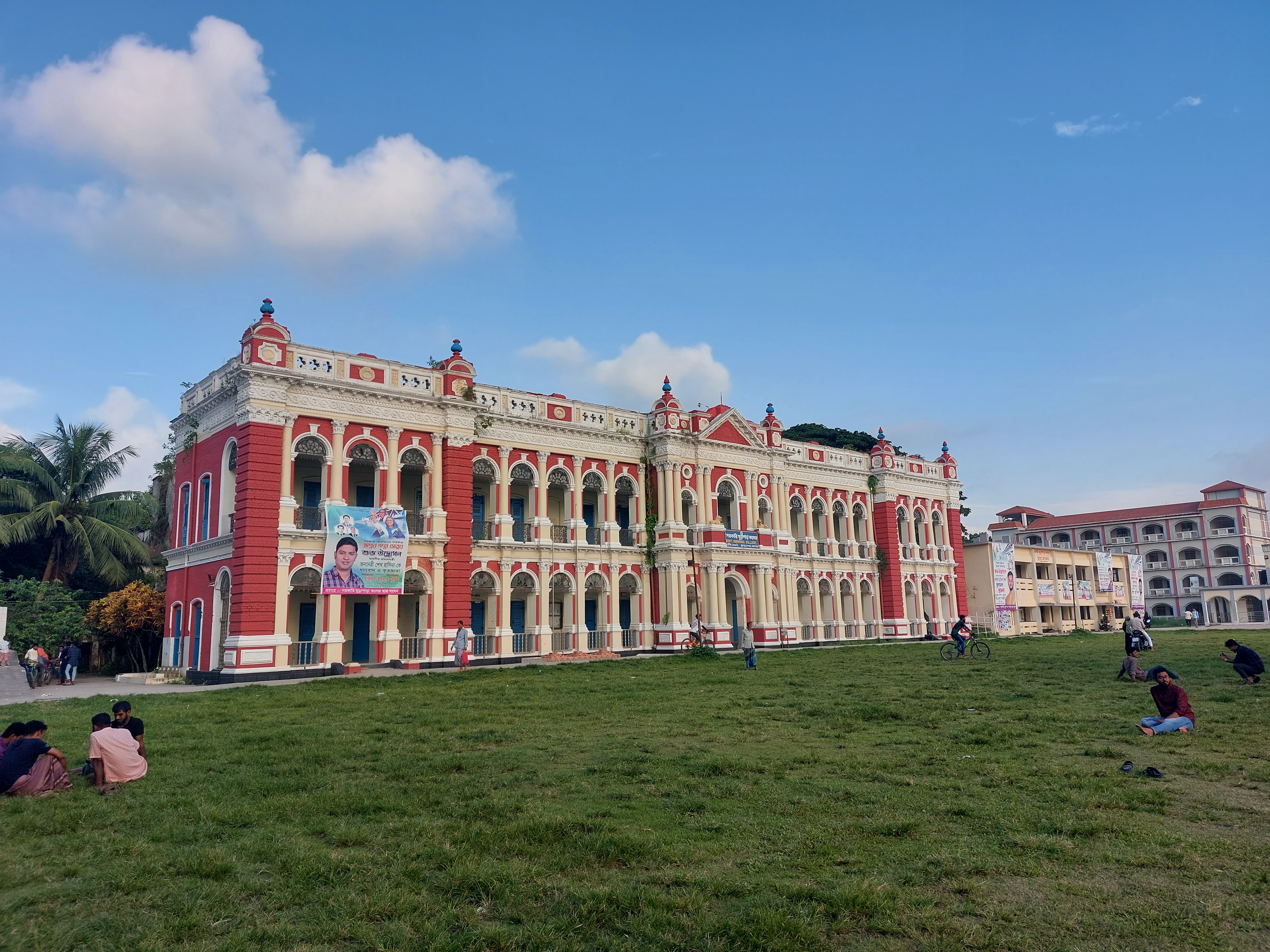
- Murapara Rajbari

- Coordinates: 23°47.6′N 90°31′E
- Country: Bangladesh
- Division: Dhaka
- District: Narayanganj

Government
  - University: Green University of Bangladesh

Area
  - Total: 176.48 km^{2} (68.14 sq mi)

Population (2022)
  - Total: 704,869
  - Density: 3,994.0/km^{2} (10,345/sq mi)
- Demonym(s): Rupganji, Rupgonji
- Time zone: UTC+6 (BST)
- Postal code: 1460
- Area code: 06725
- Notable sport teams: Legends of Rupganj
- Website: Official Map of Rupganj

Rupganj Upazila mauza geocode map

Rupganj (Bengali: রূপগঞ্জ) is an upazila of Narayanganj District in Dhaka Division, Bangladesh.

== Geography ==
Rupganj is located at 23.7931°N 90.5167°E. It has 188,226 households and total area 176.48 km^{2}.

== Demographics ==
Religions in Rupganj Upazila (2022)
Religion	Percent
Islam	94.43%
Hinduism	5.46%
Other or not stated	0.11%

According to the 2022 Bangladeshi census, Rupganj Upazila had 188,177 households and a population of 704,869. 9.05% of the population were under 5 years of age. Rupganj had a literacy rate (age 7 and over) of 78.70%: 80.79% for males and 76.42% for females, and a sex ratio of 108.64 males for every 100 females. 290,934 (41.27%) lived in urban areas.

According to the 2011 Census of Bangladesh, Rupganj Upazila had 122,140 households and a population of 534,868. 112,136 (20.97%) were under 10 years of age. Rupganj had a literacy rate (age 7 and over) of 54.8%, compared to the national average of 51.8%, and a sex ratio of 913 females per 1000 males. 232,356 (43.44%) lived in urban areas.

As of the 1991 Bangladesh census, Rupganj has a population of 375,935. Males constitute 53% of the population, and females 47%. This Upazila's eighteen-up population is 187,590. Rupganj has an average literacy rate of 37.9% (7+ years), and the national average of 32.4% literate.

== Administration ==
Rupganj Upazila is divided into Kanchan Municipality, Tarabo Municipality and seven union parishads: Bholaba, Bulta, Daudpur, Golakandail, Kayetpara, Murapara, and Rupganj. The union parishads are subdivided into 144 mauzas and 285 villages.

Kanchan Municipality and Tarabo Municipality are each subdivided into 9 wards and 9 mahallas.

== Points of interest ==
- Murapara Rajbari
- BSCIC Jamdani Village

== See also ==
- Purbachal New Town Project
- Upazilas of Bangladesh
- Districts of Bangladesh
- Divisions of Bangladesh
