= Narayanganj District =

District of Bangladesh in Dhaka Division

Narayanganj District নারায়ণগঞ্জ জেলা
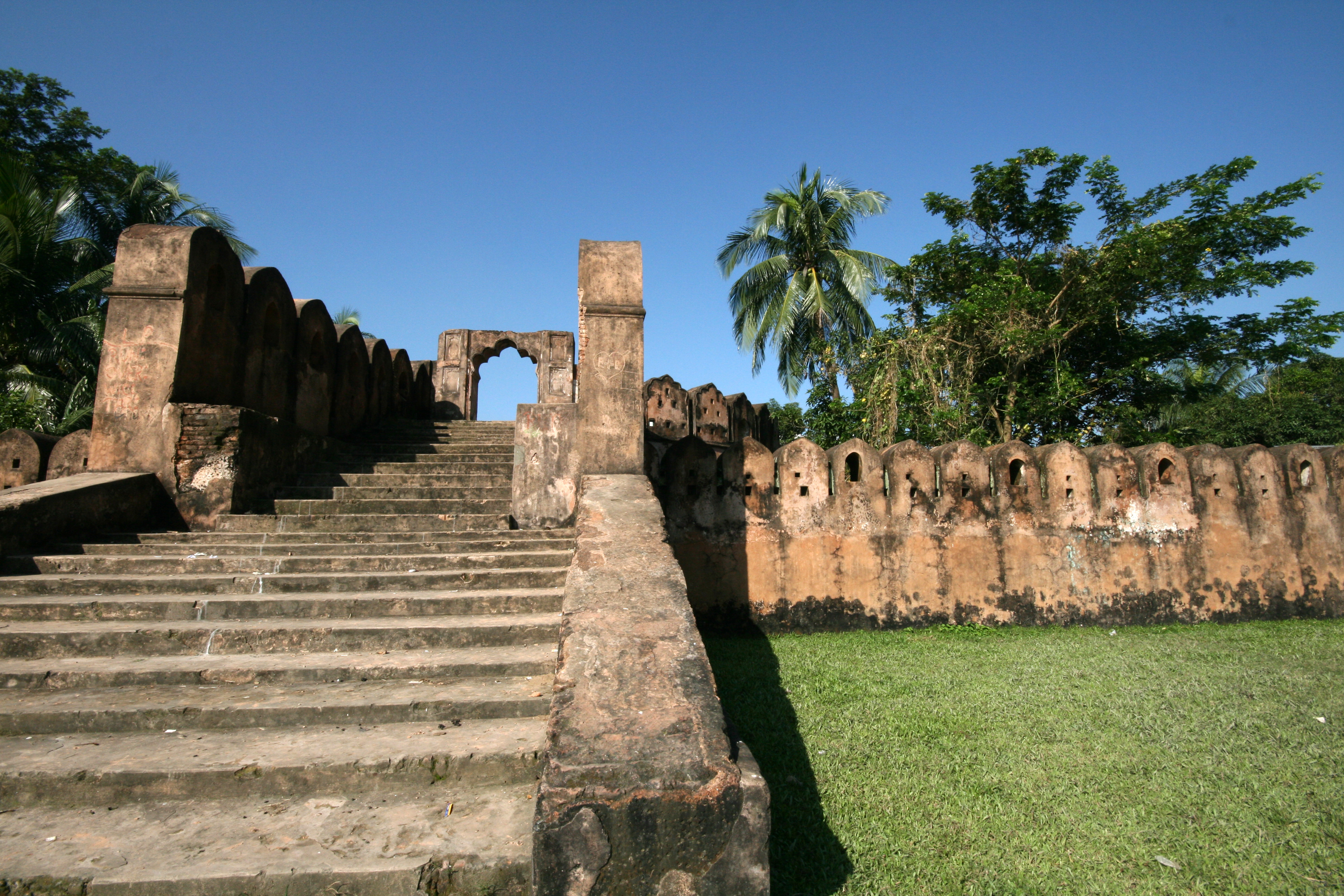
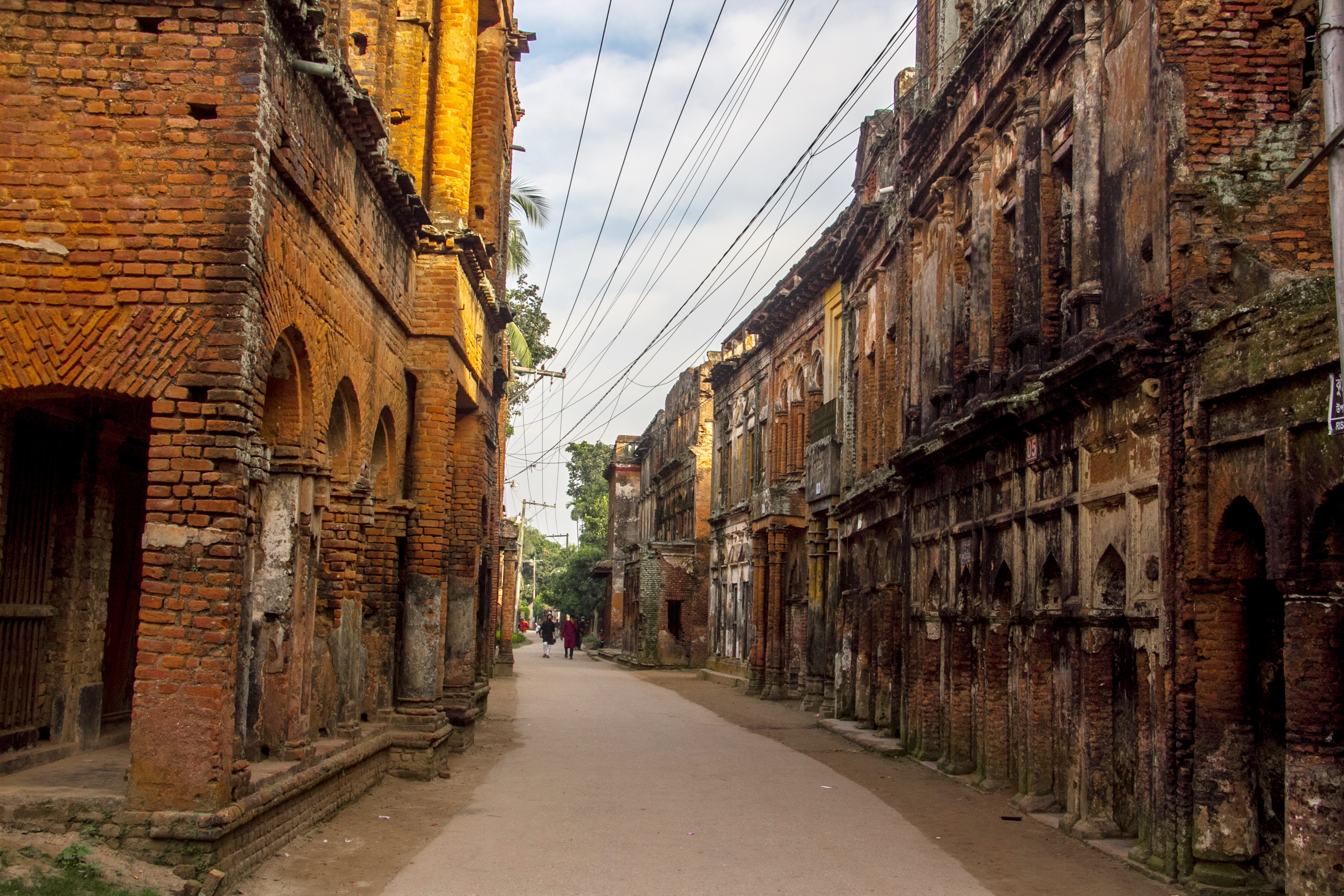
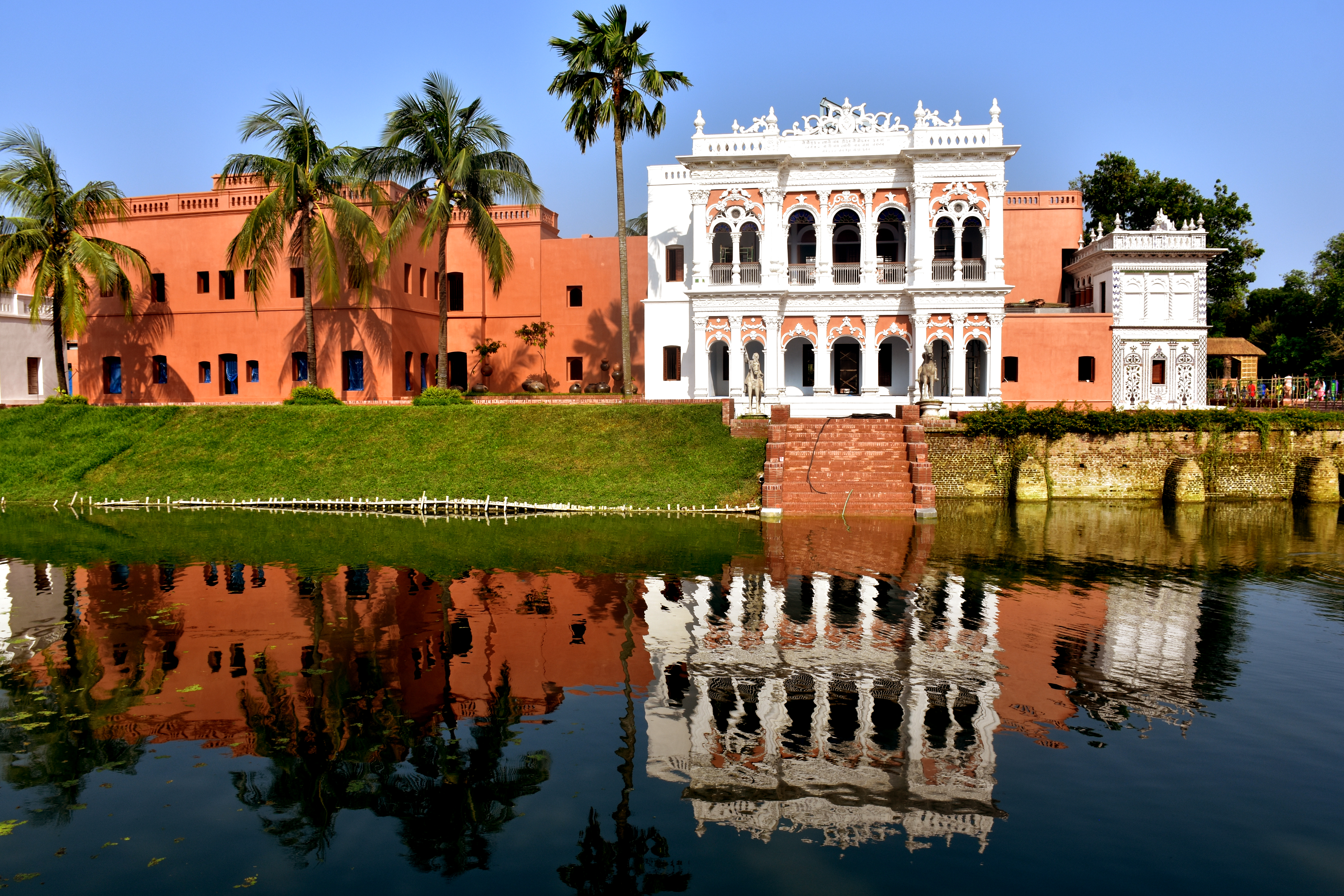
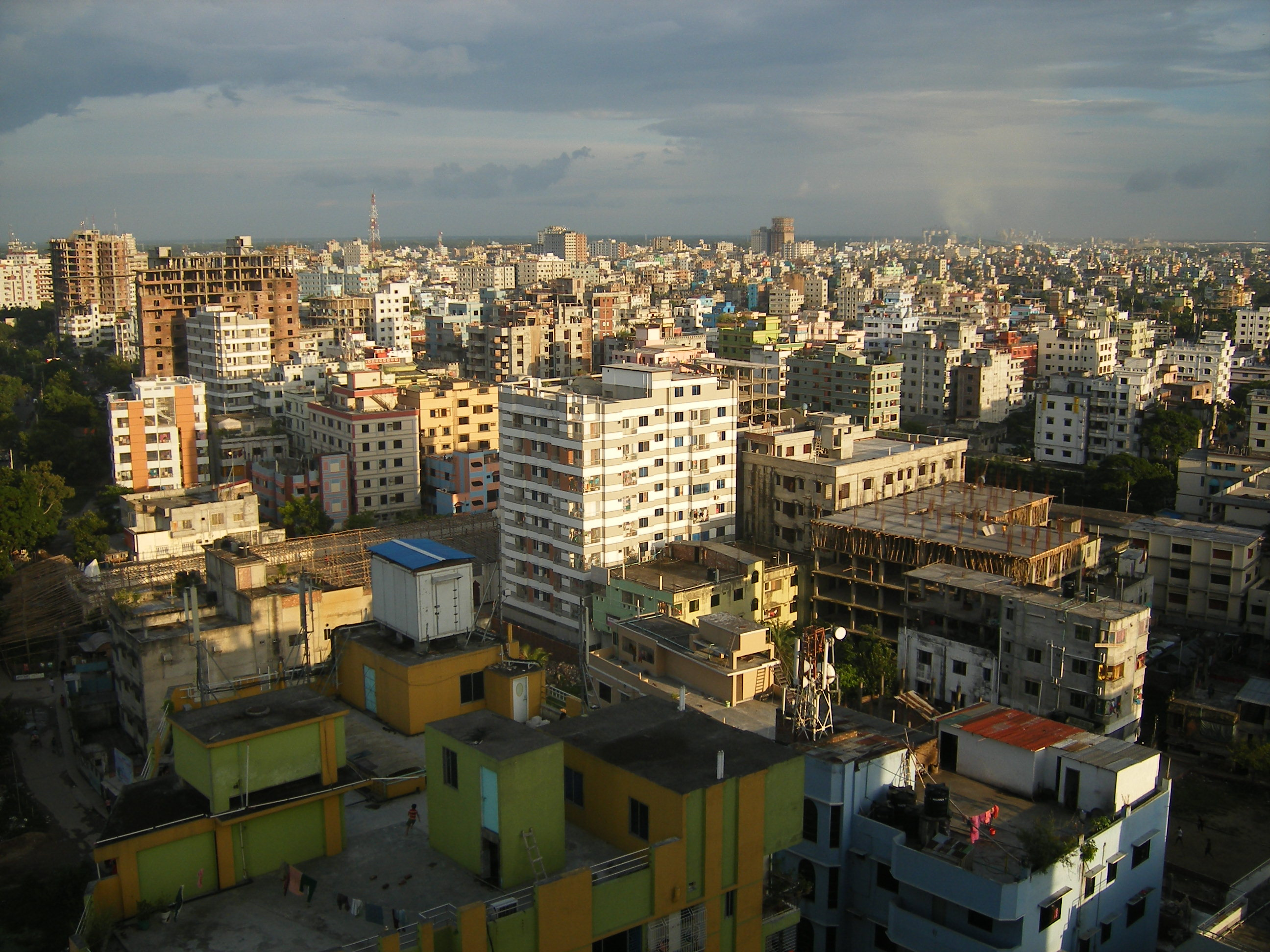
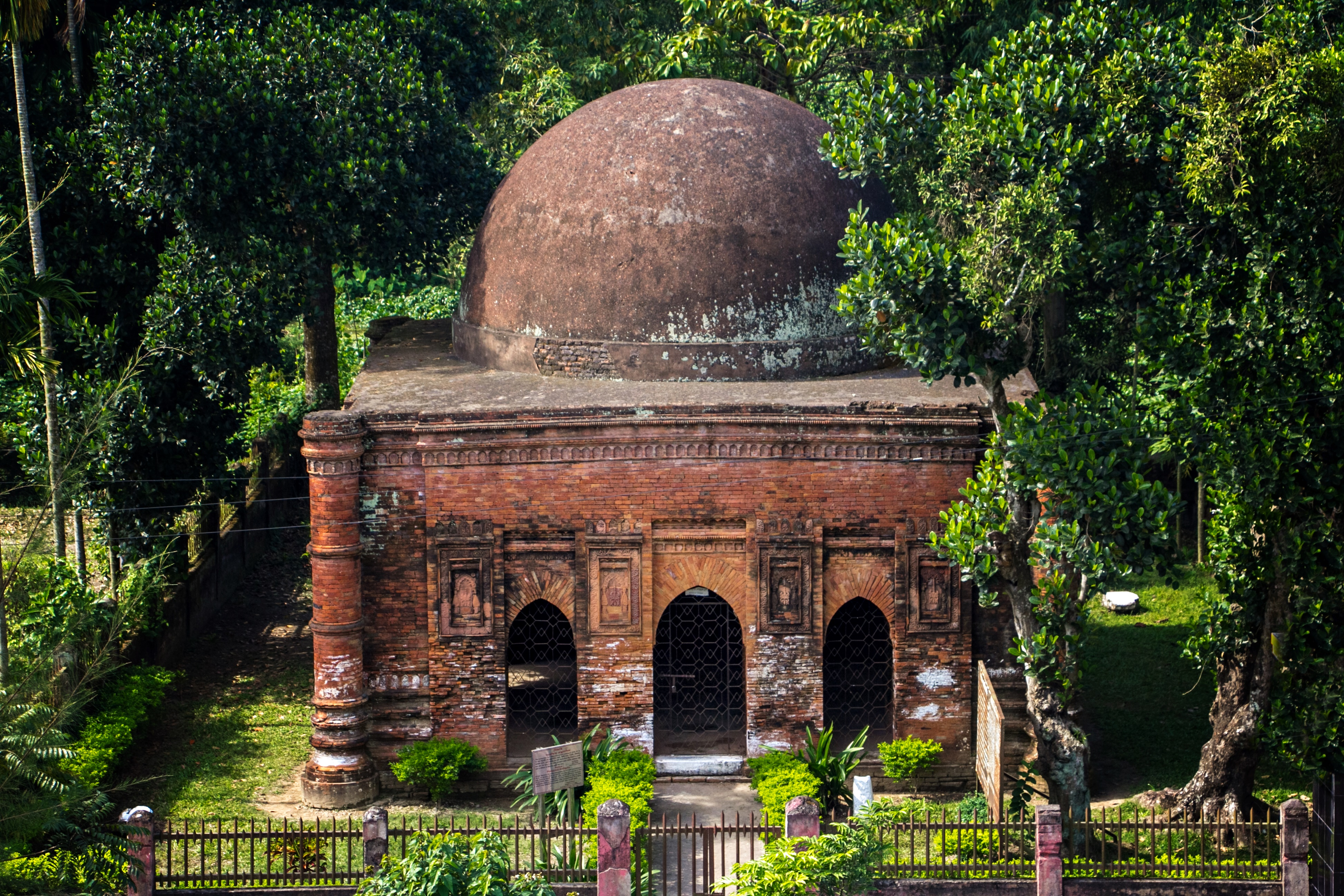
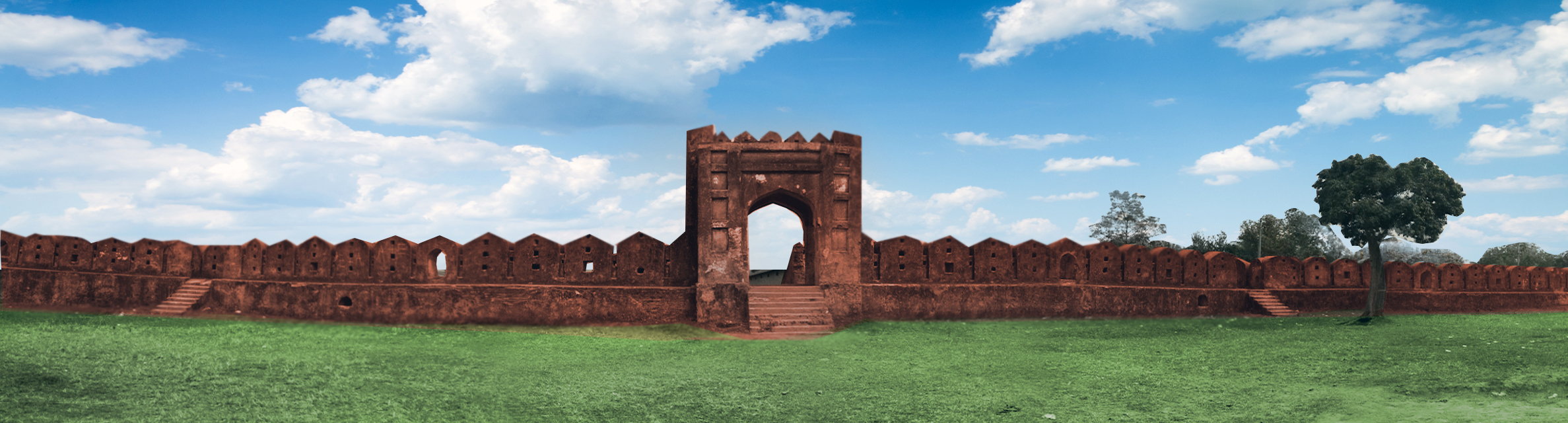
- Clockwise from top-left: Sonakanda Fort, Choto Sardar Bari, Goaldi Mosque, Hajiganj Fort, Skyline of Narayanganj City and Panam Nagar
- Nickname: Dundee of Bangladesh
- Expandable map of Narayanganj District
- Coordinates: 23.60°N 90.50°E
- Country: Bangladesh
- Division: Dhaka
- Headquarters: Narayanganj

Government
  - Deputy Commissioner: Md. Rayhan Kabir

Area
  - Total: 684.35 km^{2} (264.23 sq mi)

Population (2022)
  - Total: 3,909,138
  - Density: 5,712.2/km^{2} (14,795/sq mi)
- Time zone: UTC+06:00 (BST)
- Postal code: 1400
- Area code: 0671
- ISO 3166 code: BD-40

Narayanganj District (Bengali: নারায়ণগঞ্জ জেলা, romanized: nārāẏoṇgoñjo jela) is a district in central Bangladesh which is a part of Dhaka Division. It is the smallest district in Bangladesh. It is home to the ancient city of one of the oldest industrial districts in the country. The district lies on the banks of the Shitalakshya River and the Meghna River. It is an industrial hub and plays an important part in the country's jute trade, plant processing and sector. It is nicknamed the "Dundee of Bangladesh" due to the presence of many jute mills.

== History ==
Narayanganj had the same history as much of the rest of the Dhaka area. Formerly ruled by the Palas and Senas, the region became part of the Muslim Bengal Sultanate in the 14th century. Sonargaon, the capital of Bengal during the reign of Isa Khan, is in the district. Later the region was taken over by the Mughals as the Bengal Subah. The district is named after Bicon Lal Pandey, a Hindu religious leader who was also known as Benur Thakur or Lakshmi Narayan Thakur. Pandey acquired ownership of the region from the British East India Company in 1766 after the Battle of Plassey. He declared the marketplaces on the banks of the Shitalakshya river as endowed property to pay for expenses for the worship of Narayan. Subsequently, the region was named Narayanganj.

Important developments

- The post office was established in 1866.
- The Narayanganj municipality was officially founded on 8 September 1876.
- Dhaka–Narayanganj telegraph service was set up in 1877.
- Telephony was introduced by the Bank of Bengal in 1882.

It grew in importance in the seventeenth and eighteenth centuries, due to the influx of the Portuguese and the English. The first to develop was the west bank of Shitalakshya. Narayanganj only became important in the nineteenth century, when the Rally Brothers started a company exporting jute to the west in 1830, aided by a company from Assam. By 1908, 18 European companies, and two Indian companies were trading in jute from Calcutta.

With the formation of Pakistan in 1947, the economy transformed from being mainly a jute production to including jute milling due to the location of most existing jute mills in India. This followed the establishment of a number of mills in and around Narayanganj that gave the local economy a great boost.

During the War of Independence, the Pakistan Army massacred 139 people in Fatulla Thana on 29 November 1971. Eight days earlier, members of the Mukti Bahini and other freedom fighter groups fought the Pakistan Army in which one freedom fighter was killed.

Formerly a sub-district of the Dhaka District, Narayanganj became a district on 15 February 1984.

== Administrative areas ==
Narayanganj Zila consists of 1 city corporation and 5 upazilas (Narayanganj Sadar, Bandar, Rupganj, Sonargaon and Araihazar). Narayanganj City Corporation is subdivided into 27 wards and 184 city mahallas. Upazilas are subdivided into 39 unions, 759 mauzas and 1172 villages. There are also 5 paurashavas, subdivided into 45 paura wards and 209 paura mahallas. The areas and populations (at the 2022 Census) of the upazilas are:

Internal map of Narayanganj District.

No.	Upazila	Union	Mouza	Village	Area	Population (2022)
1	Narayanganj Sadar Upazila	10	55	450	100.74 km^{2}	1,770,734
2	Sonargaon Upazila	11	352	899	171.67 km^{2}	551,841
3	Bandar Upazila	05	90	780	54.39 km^{2}	414,019
4	Araihazar Upazila	12	184	438	181.07 km^{2}	467,547
5	Rupganj Upazila	09	146	434	176.48 km^{2}	704,869

There are also 7 police stations here, which are: Narayanganj Sadar, Bandar, Fatulla, Siddhirganj, Rupganj, Sonargaon and Araihazar. All the upazilas have more or less similar characteristics.

== Administration ==
Narayanganj District upazila geocode map

- Mayor of Narayanganj City Corporation: Md. Sakhawat hossain Khan
- Chairman of Zila Porishod:Mo. Mamun mahmud
- Deputy Commissioner (DC): Mohammad Zmmahidul Islam miah
- Chairman Of Bandar Upazila: Shibani Sarker
- Chairman Of Sonargaon Upazila: Advocate Shamsul Islam Bhuiyan

== Economy ==
The district pioneered in merchandising yarn and dyeing items. The cottage industry, like weaving, is abundant in this district. International trading, import and export business, shipyard brickfields, etc. create employment opportunities for the people which facilitate additional income to the household population. The small and medium industries of cotton are increasing day-by-day which fills the employment aids to the local people. The rural economy of Narayanganj is mostly based on agriculture. According to Bangladesh Bank, the district is ranked third in the nation in terms of gross national income (GNI) and possession of wealth. Nowadays Network marketing is the best position here. So, the economy of Narayanganj has been increasing day by day and also contributing to nation-building initiatives.

== Demographics ==
Historical population
Year	Pop.	±% p.a.
1974	1,067,026	—
1981	1,356,728	+3.49%
1991	1,754,804	+2.61%
2001	2,173,948	+2.16%
2011	2,948,217	+3.09%
2022	3,909,138	+2.60%

According to the 2022 Census of Bangladesh, Narayanganj District had 1,023,175 households and a population of 3,909,138 with an average 3.78 people per household. Among the population, 684,724 (17.52%) inhabitants were under 10 years of age. The population density was 5,712 people per km^{2}. Narayanganj District had a literacy rate (age 7 and over) of 79.24%, compared to the national average of 74.80%, and a sex ratio of almost 939 females per 1000 males. Approximately, 40.52% of the population lived in urban areas. The ethnic population was 1,267.

=== Religion ===
Religions in Narayanganj District (2022)
Religion	Percent
Islam	95.22%
Hinduism	4.71%
Other or not stated	0.07%

Religion in present-day Narayanganj district
Religion	1941 (Note: 1941 figures are for Narayanganj, Fatullah, Baidyabazar, Rupganj and Araihazar thanas of erstwhile Dhaka district. District and thana borders have shifted since 1941.)		1981		1991		2001		2011		2022	
Religion	Pop.	%	Pop.	%	Pop.	%	Pop.	%	Pop.	%	Pop.	%
Islam	420,140	72.91%	1,236,101	91.11%	1,624,772	92.59%	2,057,398	94.64%	2,802,567	95.06%	3,722,125	95.22%
Hinduism	149,650	25.97%	107,605	7.93%	112,769	6.43%	115,157	5.30%	144,105	4.89%	184,309	4.71%
Christianity	6,090	1.06%	11,966	0.88%	14,116	0.80%	695	0.03%	963	0.03%	1,511	0.04%
Others (Note: Including Jainism, Buddhism, Zoroastrianism, Judaism, Ad-Dharmis, or not stated)	349	0.06%	1,056	0.08%	3,147	0.18%	698	0.03%	582	0.02%	1,193	0.03%
Total Population	576,229	100%	1,356,728	100%	1,754,804	100%	2,173,948	100%	2,948,217	100%	3,909,138	100%

In 2011, the district had 95.06% Muslims and 4.89% Hindus. The district of Narayanganj has 3080 mosques, 269 temples, 10 churches and 4 Buddhist temples. There are around 1,500 Christians and 1,000 Buddhists in the district. Moreover; there is an institute called 'Narayanganj Institute of Islam', which conducts research activities on comparative religions.

== Places of interest ==
- BSCIC Jamdani Village
- ancient city of Sonargaon
- The Dhaka-Narayanganj-Demra (DND) embankment
- Shaira Garden near Nazimuddin Bhuiyan Degree College at Madanpur
- The Bangladesh Engineering and Ship Building Corporation at Sonakanda on the east bank of the Shitalakshya River
- Zinda Park
- Narayanganj City Park, Purbachal City.
- Bishnandi Ferry Ghat and Meghan River.

== Flora and fauna ==
=== Flora ===
Almost the whole of Narayanganj district lies on the meander flood plain. Most of this area is now flooded only by rainwater. Only minor areas near the Old Brahmaputra, Meghna, Shitalakshya and Dhaleswari rivers are affected by river water and receive fresh silt deposits. A wide variety of soils occurs in this district.

=== Fauna ===
==== Mammals ====
Mammals that are commonly seen in the district are Indian pipistrelle (Pipistrellus coromandra).

==== Birds ====
The most common birds of the district include doel, salik, crow and duck.

==== Fish ====
In the river, canals, beels, and ponds there are various kinds of fish, but because of water pollution, it is very hard to see fish in the river.

== See also ==
- Districts of Bangladesh
- Divisions of Bangladesh
- Upazilas of Bangladesh
- Administrative geography of Bangladesh
- Upazila Nirbahi Officer
- Jolshiri Abashon
