= Union councils of Narayanganj District =

Union councils of Narayanganj District (Bengali: নারায়ণগঞ্জ জেলার ইউনিয়ন পরিষদসমূহ) are the smallest rural administrative and local government units in Narayanganj District of Bangladesh. The district consists of 5 municipalities, 5 upazilas, 7 thana, 39 union porishods, mouza 757 and 1374 villages.

== Araihazar Upazila ==
Araihazar Upazila is divided into Araihazar Municipality, Gopaldi Municipality, and 11 union parishads:

- Araihazar Union
- Bishnandi Union
- Brahmandi Bazar Union
- Duptara Union
- Fatehpur Union
- Haizadi Union
- Kala Paharia Union
- Khagakanda Union
- Mahmudpur Union
- Satgram Union
- Sadasardi Union
- Uchitpur Union

== Bandar Upazila ==
The union parishads are subdivided into 89 mauzas and 158 villages. Bandar Upazila is divided into five union parishads:

- Bandar Union
- Dhamgar Union
- Kalagachhia Union
- Madanpur Union
- Musapur Union

== Narayanganj Sadar Upazila ==
Narayanganj Sadar Upazila is divided into 10 union parishads and a City Corporation. The union parishads are subdivided into 56 mauzas and 132 villages.

- Alirtek Union
- Baktaboli Union
- Enayetnagar Union
- Fatullah Union
- Gognagar Union
- Kashipur Union
- Kutubpur Union
- Siddhirganj (defunct)

== Rupganj Upazila ==
Rupganj Upazila is divided into Kanchan Municipality, Tarabo Municipality and seven union parishads: The union parishads are subdivided into 144 mauzas and 285 villages.

Kanchan Municipality and Tarabo Municipality are each subdivided into 9 wards and 9 mahallas.

- Bholaba Union
- Bulta Union
- Daudpur Bazar Union
- Golakandail Union
- Kayet Para Union
- Mura Para Union
- Rupganj Union

== Sonargaon Upazila ==
Sonargaon Municipality is subdivided into 9 wards and 60 mahallas. The union parishads are subdivided into 351 mauzas and 487 villages.

Sonargaon Upazila is divided into Sonargaon Municipality and ten union parishads:

- Aminpur Union
- Baradi Union
- Baidyer Bazar Union
- Jampur Union
- Kachpur Union
- Mugra Para Union
- Noagaon Union, Narayanganj
- Pirijpur Union
- Shambhupura Union
- Sanmandi Union
- Sadipur Union
