= Baradi (disambiguation) =

Baradi is a rāga belonging to the tradition of Odissi music.

Baradi may also refer to:

== Places ==
=== India ===
- Baradi, Goa, village subdivision in Goa, India
- Bara Dih, village in Uttar Pradesh, India
- Baradi (village), village in Maharashtra, India
- Baradiya, village in Gujarat, India

=== Australia ===
- Baradine, town in New South Wales, Australia
- Baradine County, one of the Cadastral divisions of New South Wales, Australia

=== Other ===
- Baradili, municipality in the Province of Oristano, Italy

== Unions ==
- Baradi Union, smallest administrative body of Bangladesh
- Baradi Union, Alamdanga, union parishad in Alamdanga Upazila, Bangladesh

== Railway station ==
- Baradighi railway station, railway station in West Bengal, India
