= Bandar Upazila =

Bandar বন্দর
- Upazila
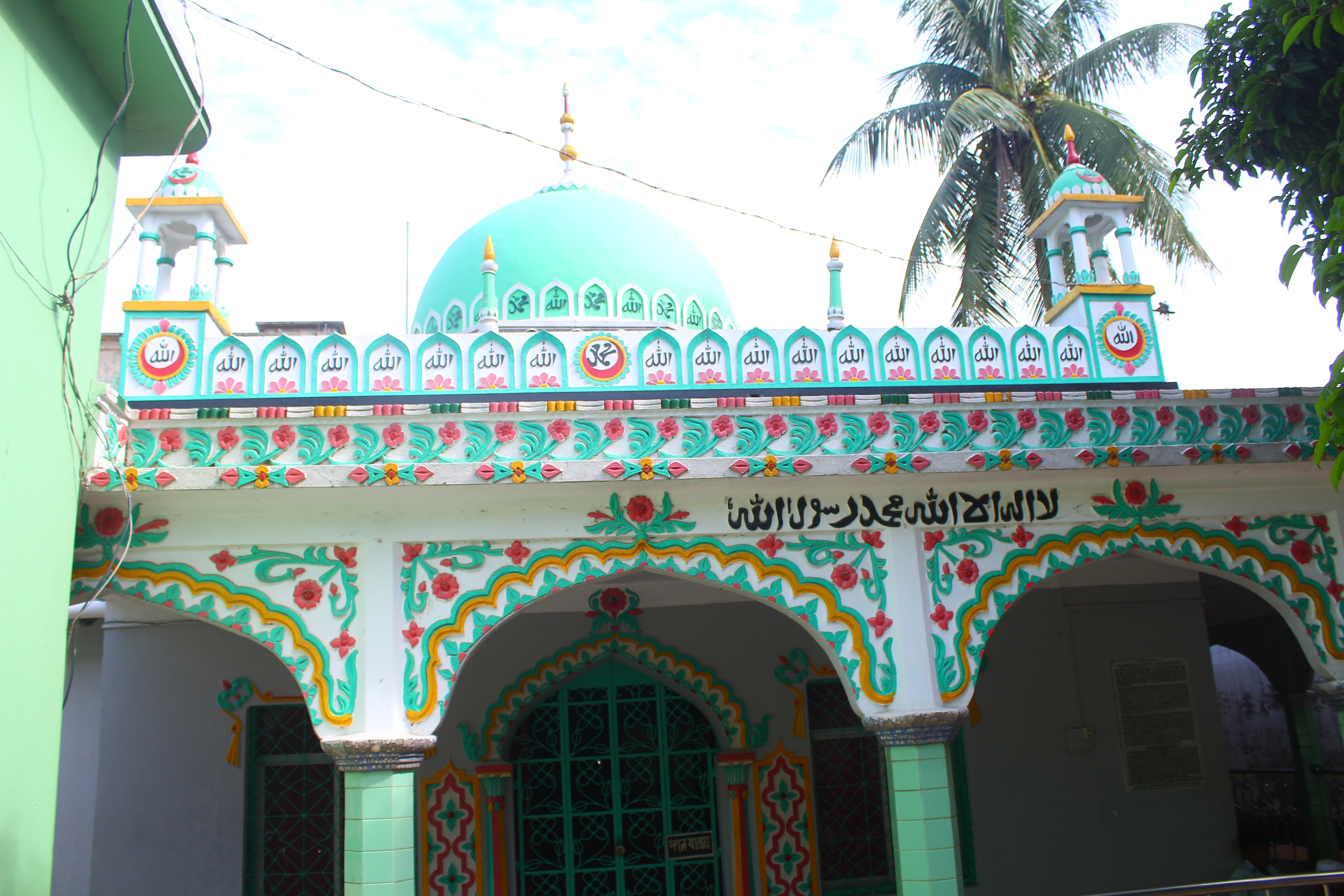
- Tomb of Haji Baba Saleh

- Coordinates: 23°37′N 90°31.5′E
- Country: Bangladesh
- Division: Dhaka
- District: Narayanganj
- Thana: 1964
- Upazila: 1993

Area
  - Upazila: 54.39 km^{2} (21.00 sq mi)

Population (2022)
  - Upazila: 414,019
  - Density: 7,612/km^{2} (19,720/sq mi)
  - Urban: 209,233
- Time zone: UTC+6 (BST)
- Postal code: 1410
- Area code: 06724
- Website: bandar.narayanganj.gov.bd

Bandar Upazila mauza geocode map

Bandar (Bengali: বন্দর, romanized: Bondor, lit. 'Port') is an upazila (sub-district) of the Narayanganj District in central Bangladesh, part of the Dhaka Division. Bandar is a part of Greater Dhaka; the conurbation surrounding the Bangladeshi capital city of Dhaka.

== Geography ==
Bandar is located at 23°35′35″N 090°31′13″E. It has a total area of 54.39 km^{2}. It is separated from Narayanganj Sadar Upazila and Munshiganj Sadar Upazila by the Shitalakshya River to its west and south. Bandar is bounded by Sonargaon Upazila to its north and east.

== History ==
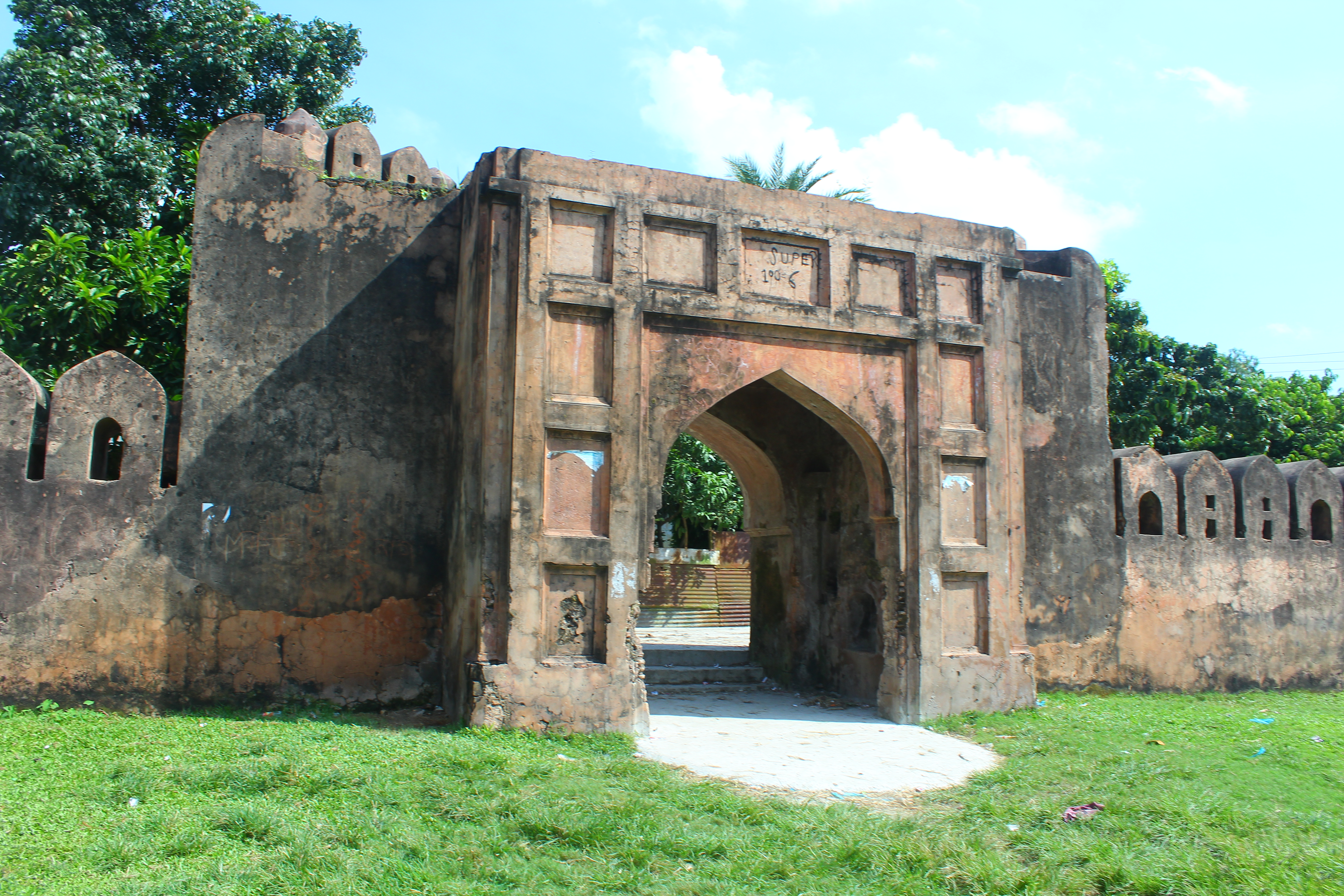
Entrance gate of the Sonakanda Fort in Bandar.

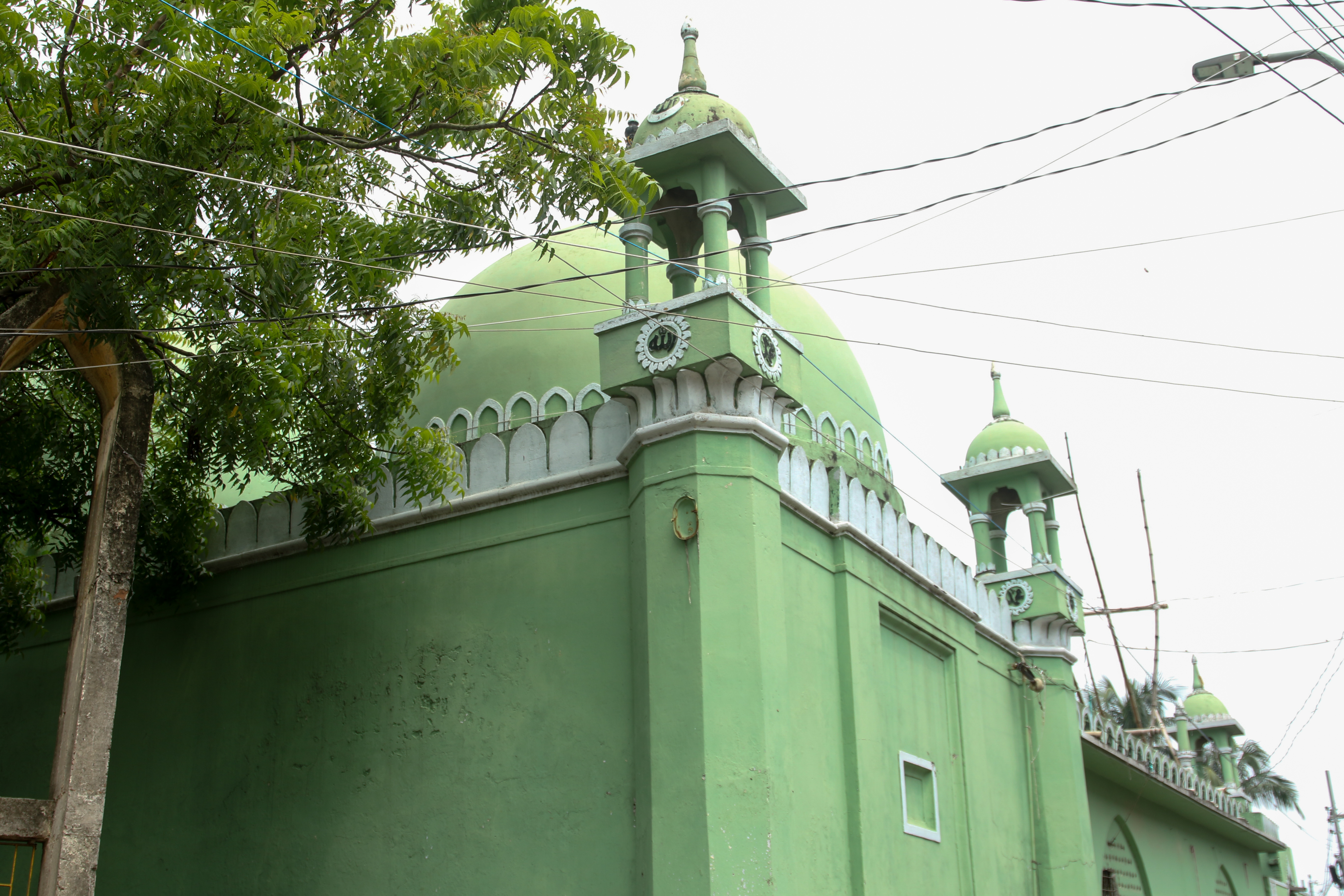
The 16th-century Haji Baba Saleh Mosque is a prominent place of worship in Salehnagar, Bandar Upazila.

The history of Bandar spans several centuries, and it became a principal bandar (port) not far from the medieval capitals of Sonargaon and Jahangirnagar. In 1481 AD, the Bandar Shahi Mosque was constructed which became a focal point for Islam in Bandar. A Muslim preacher and Bengal Sultanate officer by the name of Haji Baba Saleh migrated to a village in Bandar where he invited the locals to Islam. The village then came to be known as Salehnagar, or the city of Saleh. A mosque and mazar (mausoleum) was later built and named after him in 1504 AD.

After the fall of the Bengal Sultanate in the late sixteenth century, independent chieftains formed a confederacy known as the Baro-Bhuiyans to defend Bengal from Mughal integration. Numerous battles were fought in Bandar between the Mughal forces and Baro-Bhuiyans such as Musa Khan, Dawud Khan, Abdullah Khan and others. Musa's grandson, Dewan Munawwar Khan, later moved his residence to what came to be known as Dewanbagh (or Munawwar Khan Bagh) in Bandar, where he also built the Qadam Rasul monument and was buried east of the historic Dewanbagh Mosque. Historians suggest that the Sonakanda Fort in Bandar was built by Mughal governor Mir Jumla II to protect against pirates.

Bandar was established as a thana in 1964. During the Bangladesh Liberation War of 1971, a mass killing was conducted in Sirajdoullah Club playground leading to the death of 54 people on 4 April. On 22 November, a brawl took place between the Pakistan Army and the Bengali freedom fighters at the banks of the Shitalakshya in Dhamgar. Another battle took place 5 days later in which a Pakistan Army gunboat was destroyed and numerous Pakistan Army soldiers killed. Defeated again on 12 December, the Pakistan Army fled to the western side of the Shitalakshya. A direct encounter took place in Bandar Railway Station where many soldiers were killed or wounded and were forced to surrender. Bandar Thana became liberated on 15 December. In 1993, Bandar Thana's status was upgraded to upazila.

== Demographics ==
Historical population
Year	Pop.	±%
1981	198,000	—
1991	213,000	+7.6%
2001	250,000	+17.4%
2011	313,000	+25.2%
2022	414,019	+32.3%
Source: Bangladesh Bureau of Statistics

Religions in Bandar Upazila (2022)
Religion	Percent
Islam	97.57%
Hinduism	2.39%
Other or not stated	0.04%

According to the 2022 Bangladeshi census, Bandar Upazila had 51,231 households and a population of 204,786. 9.20% of the population were under 5 years of age. Bandar had a literacy rate (age 7 and over) of 78.50%: 80.27% for males and 76.67% for females, and a sex ratio of 102.92 males for every 100 females. 17,640 (8.61%) lived in urban areas.

Madrasas in Bandar
Name
Bandar Islamia Senior Madrasa
Madanpur Riazul Uloom Senior Madrasa

== Administration ==
Bandar Upazila is divided into five union parishads: Bandar, Dhamgar, Kalagachhia, Madanpur, and Musapur. The union parishads are subdivided into 89 mauzas and 158 villages.

== Economy and tourism ==
Bandar's ancient history has made it a popular place of tourism. Home to 252 mosques, noted ones include the Bandar Shahi Mosque, the mosque and mausoleum of Haji Baba Saleh and the Farazikanda Mosque. Other notable sites include the Qadam Rasul in Nabiganj and the Sonakanda Fort, both dating back several hundred years.

== See also ==
- Upazilas of Bangladesh
- Districts of Bangladesh
- Divisions of Bangladesh
