= Azharul Islam Mannan =

Bangladeshi politician (born 1965)

- আজহারুল ইসলাম মান্নান

Member of the Bangladesh Parliament for Narayanganj-3
- Incumbent
- Assumed office 17 February 2026
- Preceded by: Abdullah-Al-Kaisar

Personal details
- Born: 25 December 1965 (age 60) Sonargaon Upazila, Narayanganj District
- Party: Bangladesh Nationalist Party

Azharul Islam Mannan is a Bangladeshi politician. As of March 2026, he is serving as a member of parliament from Narayanganj-3.

== Early life ==
Mannan was born on 25 December 1965 at Sonargaon Upazila under Narayanganj District.
