= Narayanganj-3 =

Constituency of Bangladesh's Jatiya Sangsad

- Constituency for the Jatiya Sangsad
- District: Narayanganj District
- Division: Dhaka Division
- Electorate: 593,348 (2026)

Current constituency
- Created: 1984
- Party: Bangladesh Nationalist Party
- Member: Azharul Islam Mannan
- ← 205 Narayanganj-2 207 Narayanganj-4 →

Narayanganj-3 is a constituency represented in the Jatiya Sangsad (National Parliament) of Bangladesh since 2026 by Azharul Islam Mannan of the Bangladesh Nationalist Party.

== Boundaries ==
The constituency encompasses Sonargaon Upazila and Siddhirganj thana of Narayanganj City Corporation.

== History ==
The constituency was created in 1984 from a Dhaka constituency when the former Dhaka District was split into six districts: Manikganj, Munshiganj, Dhaka, Gazipur, Narsingdi, and Narayanganj.

As of 2008, the constituency encompassed Sonargaon Upazila, and three union parishads of Narayanganj Sadar Upazila: Godnail, Siddirganj, and Sumil Para.

Ahead of the 2014 general election, the Election Commission reduced the boundaries of the constituency to include only Sonargaon Upazila.

In 2025, the Election Commission expanded the boundaries of the constituency to include Siddhirganj thana of Narayanganj City Corporation.

== Members of Parliament ==
Election	Member	Party
1986	Mubarak Hossain	Jatiya Party
1988	Abu Nur Mohammad Bahaul Haq	Jatiya Party
1991	Rezaul Karim	Bangladesh Nationalist Party
Feb 1996	Rezaul Karim	Bangladesh Nationalist Party
Jun 1996	Rezaul Karim	Bangladesh Nationalist Party
2001	Rezaul Karim	Bangladesh Nationalist Party
2008	Abdullah-Al-Kaisar	Awami League
2014	Liyakot Hossain Khoka	Jatiya Party (Ershad)
2018	Liyakot Hossain Khoka	Jatiya Party (Ershad)
2024	Abdullah-Al-Kaisar	Awami League
2026	Azharul Islam Mannan	Bangladesh Nationalist Party

== Elections ==
=== Elections in the 2020s ===
General Election 2026: Narayanganj-3
Party	Candidate	Votes	%	±%
BNP	Azharul Islam Mannan	155,400	46.7	N/A
Jamaat	Md. Iqbal Hossain Bhuiyan	134,918	40.5	N/A
Independent	Muhammad Ghiyas Uddin	20,379	6.1	N/A
IAB	Golam Masih	14,223	4.3	N/A
Independent	Md. Rezaul Karim	4,596	1.4	N/A
Bangladesh Khelafat Majlis	Md. Shahjahan	1,193	0.4	N/A
GSA	Anjan Das	838	0.3	N/A
BKA	Md. Atiqur Rahman Nannu Munshi	769	0.2	N/A
GOP	Md. Wahidur Rahman Milky	314	0.1	N/A
Janotar Dol	Abdul Karim Munshi	285	0.1	N/A
AB Party	Ariful Islam	137	0.0	N/A
Majority		20,482	6.1	N/A
Turnout		333,052	56.1	N/A
Registered electors		593,348		
BNP gain from AL				

=== Elections in the 2010s ===
Liyakot Hossain Khoka was elected unopposed in the 2014 general election after opposition parties withdrew their candidacies in a boycott of the election.

=== Elections in the 2000s ===
General Election 2008: Narayanganj-3
Party	Candidate	Votes	%	±%
AL	Abdullah-Al-Kaisar	192,659	61.1	+23.8
BNP	Rezaul Karim	110,062	34.9	−22.5
IAB	Md. Atiqur Rahman Nanlu Munshi	10,636	3.4	N/A
CPB	Zia Haider	823	0.3	+0.1
BTF	Md. Mujibur Rahman (Manik)	727	0.2	N/A
BSD	Zahirul Islam	237	0.1	N/A
Majority		82,597	26.2	+6.2
Turnout		315,144	86.3	+11.8
AL gain from BNP				

General Election 2001: Narayanganj-3
Party	Candidate	Votes	%	±%
BNP	Rezaul Karim	84,001	57.4	+13.7
AL	Abu Nur Mohammad Bahaul Haq	54,683	37.3	+4.2
IJOF	Golam Masih	7,402	5.1	N/A
CPB	Zia Haider Dipty	363	0.2	N/A
Majority		29,318	20.0	+9.5
Turnout		146,449	74.5	−7.6
BNP hold				

=== Elections in the 1990s ===
General Election June 1996: Narayanganj-3
Party	Candidate	Votes	%	±%
BNP	Rezaul Karim	50,791	43.7	−9.7
AL	Abul Hasnat	38,529	33.1	+2.0
JP(E)	Abu Nur Mohammad Bahaul Haq	24,399	21.0	+12.4
Jamaat	Abu Jafar Md. Ataullah	1,536	1.3	N/A
Zaker Party	Md. Habibur Rahman Khan	884	0.8	−4.5
Ganotantrik Sarbahara Party	Md. Sirajul Islam	140	0.1	N/A
Majority		12,262	10.5	−11.7
Turnout		116,279	82.1	+23.1
BNP hold				

General Election 1991: Narayanganj-3
Party	Candidate	Votes	%	±%
BNP	Rezaul Karim	50,769	53.4	
AL	Abul Hasnat	29,613	31.1	
JP(E)	Ahammad Hossein Bhuiya	8,166	8.6	
Zaker Party	A. S. M. Solaiman	5,065	5.3	
Bangladesh Samajtantrik Dal (Khalekuzzaman)	Zahirul Islam	465	0.5	
JSD (Rab)	Sahab Uddin Ahmed	456	0.5	
Jatiya Janata Party and Gonotantrik Oikkya Jot	Sirajul Islam Kondokar	426	0.4	
Independent	Sadekur Rahman	142	0.1	
Majority		21,156	22.2	
Turnout		95,102	59.0	
BNP gain from JP(E)				
