= Samiullah Azmi =

Bangladeshi Maoist insurgent (1947–1971)

- সামিউল্লাহ আজমী
- Born: January 1947; Ballia, United Provinces, British India
- Died: August 1971 (aged 24); Savar, Dhaka, Bangladesh
- Cause of death: Assassinated
- Other names: Comrade Taher, Ruhul Amin
- Education: Government Shaheed Suhrawardy College; Government Science College, Dhaka; BAF Shaheen College Dhaka
- Occupations: Revolutionary, political activist
- Years active: 1967–1971
- Organization(s): East Bengal Workers' Movement; National Freedom Fighters of East Bengal
- Known for: Freedom Fighter, Politician, Second-in-command of the East Bengal Workers' Movement
- Political party: Purba Banglar Sarbahara Party
- Spouse: Monji Khaleda Begum (m. 1970; died 1971)

Samiullah Azmi (Bengali: সামিউল্লাহ আজমী; January 1947 – August 1971) was a Bangladeshi revolutionary, freedom fighter and Marxist–Leninist–Maoist insurgent who served as the second-in-command of the East Bengal Workers' Movement and closest associate of Siraj Sikder.

== Early life ==
Samiullah Azmi was born in January 1947 in Ballia, United Provinces, British India, as the fifth of eight children born to Mohammad Safiullah and Mehrunnessa Begum. Both parents originated from Koiriyapar in the Azamgarh district (present-day Mau district) of Uttar Pradesh. Although a 1991 Purba Banglar Sarbahara Party publication titled Shfulingo described his family as refugees from Hyderabad, family records indicate their origins were in Uttar Pradesh. Following the partition of India in 1948, the family migrated to East Pakistan, where his father worked as a station master for the East Bengal Railway (later renamed the Pakistan Eastern Railway). Due to his father's frequent postings, Azmi lived across various railway towns in East Bengal, including Tistamuk Ghat, Ruhea, Badarganj, Kauniya, Gaibandha, Feni, Sylhet, Jamalpur, South Dhaka, and Goalundo Ghat.

Azmi received his primary education at Bengali-medium schools in Talora, Gaibandha, and Feni before moving with his family to Dhaka, where he attended English-medium institutions, including Don's School and Shaheen School. He pursued his higher secondary education at the Intermediate Technical College in Tejgaon and later enrolled at Quaid-i-Azam College (now Government Shaheed Suhrawardy College) in Dhaka to pursue a Bachelor of Science degree in Soil Science. Azmi did not complete his university studies, leaving higher education to engage in underground political activities. Prior to entering political clandestinity in 1969, he resided with his family in the Sabujbagh area of Kamalapur, Dhaka.

== Political activity ==
=== Early career ===
Azmi began his political involvement in early 1967 when he organized participation in a public demonstration commemorating Language Movement Day in Dhaka. In late 1967, during a visit to East Pakistan by Zulfikar Ali Bhutto to gather support for the newly formed Pakistan People's Party (PPP), Azmi arranged an in-person meeting with Bhutto at the Hotel Intercontinental in Dhaka. During the meeting, Azmi presented Bhutto with copies of Teach Yourself Bengali and an English translation of Kazi Nazrul Islam's poetry.

=== Joining underground communist movement (1967–1969) ===
In late 1967, Azmi met civil engineer and activist Siraj Sikder at the office of the East Pakistan Students' Union (EPSU-Menon Faction) in Azimpur, Dhaka. Azmi subsequently became Sikder's primary associate and key recruit in organizing a revolutionary movement aimed at East Bengal's independence. The group held regular planning sessions at Sikder's residence in Rampura, Dhaka. Sikder developed a thesis based on Mao Zedong's theoretical framework, identifying "Pakistani colonialism" as the principal political enemy of East Bengal, alongside feudalism, imperialism, and local agents' interests. The group's strategy involved mobilizing the rural peasantry, conducting guerrilla operations, encircling urban areas, and establishing a socialist state. During this period, early associates experimented with manufacturing explosives at Sikder's home.

==== Teknaf Operation ====
In the spring of 1968, Sikder took an engineering position on a bridge construction project near Teknaf, in southernmost East Pakistan, to secure funding and establish a geographical base near the East Pakistan-Burma border. Approximately twelve recruits, including Azmi, traveled to Teknaf posing as university students conducting academic research. The group attempted to disseminate Marxist-Maoist concepts among local agricultural workers and later initiated manual excavation of Viet Cong style defensive tunnels in the nearby forested hills. Azmi was placed in charge of the hilltop camp, but the difficult terrain and poor weather forced the abandonment of the tunneling project.

Azmi led a small unit across the Naf River into Arakan, Burma to seek material support and training from the Communist Party of Burma (CPB). Upon arrival, local Rohingya villagers brought them food but informed them that their guides were actually bandits who had no affiliation with CPB. The unit returned across the border to East Pakistan without making contact with the CPB. Following a brief, unsuccessful attempt to organize industrial workers in Chittagong, the group returned to Dhaka.

Following the failure of early field operations, Sikder, Azmi, and Azmi's brother Razi met in late 1968 at Rampura, where they signed a formal oath in blood to reaffirm their political commitment. The members adopted pseudonyms sharing the prefix "Ruhul"; Sikder became "Ruhul Alam", while Azmi assumed the name "Ruhul Amin" (later known within the underground movement as "Comrade Taher").

In the second half of 1968, the group founded an open political front, the Mao Tse Tung Chintadhara Gobeshonakendra (Maoist Thought Research Centre), in Malibagh, Dhaka, to recruit students and host political discussions. Azmi served as its primary director and organizer before transitioning fully into underground operational work.

==== Jinjira Congress (1969) ====
On 8 January 1969, the group convened the First Congress of the Purba Banglar Sramik Andolon (East Bengal Workers' Movement), the organizational precursor to the Purba Banglar Sarbahara Party. The secret meeting was held in Jinjira, Keraniganj, across the Buriganga River from Dhaka. The congress formally recognized Sikder as the principal leader of the movement and designated Azmi as second-in-command. Following the congress, Azmi ceased regular contact with his family and entered full clandestinity.

=== Full underground activities and urban guerrilla operations (1970) ===
By late 1969, Azmi had entered full clandestinity, cutting off regular contact with his family to manage the party's secret network. He operated primarily out of a safe house in Khilgaon, Dhaka, which served as a depot for storing improvised explosives and planning tactical weapons acquisitions.

In 1970, Azmi married Monji Khaleda Begum (known by the party aliases "Bulu" and "Sufia"), who had traveled from West Bengal to East Pakistan. Following her departure to join the underground movement, Khaleda's brother filed a criminal complaint against Azmi and his brother Razi, falsely alleging abduction. The legal case was eventually dismissed by police after Khaleda's family declined to pursue prosecution. During a brief meeting arranged with his mother in Mirpur during this period, Azmi's mother presented Khaleda with a traditional gold wedding necklace, which Azmi immediately consigned to the party's central operational fund.

==== May 1970 urban arson attacks ====
On 5 May 1970, the East Bengal Workers' Movement (EBWM) carried out synchronized urban sabotage actions in Dhaka to mark Karl Marx's 152nd birth anniversary. Azmi commanded a squad of student cadres in an attack on the library of the Pakistan Council for National Integration on Topkhana Road. After securing the premises and delivering a speech condemning the council, the squad set fire to the facility using Molotov Cocktail. A simultaneous attack was conducted by a second squad against the adjacent United States Information Service (USIS) building. The synchronized operations caused notable property damage, received widespread press coverage, and marked the EBWM's first major public acts of urban guerrilla violence.

==== Regional expansion to Barisal and Chittagong ====
In mid-1970, Azmi was reassigned to the southern district of Barisal to extend the party's rural network. Due to increased police surveillance, Azmi and a group of approximately fourteen cadres to evacuate Barisal for Chittagong in September 1970. While separate detachments were sent into Ramgarh and Bandarban to mobilize tea plantation workers and local indigenous populations, Azmi remained in Chittagong to direct regional operations. Operating under severe financial constraints from a safe house in Halishahar, Azmi and his associates organized political study circles for urban students and industrial factory workers until early 1971.

=== 1971 Liberation War ===
During the Operation Searchlight by the Pakistan military on 25 March 1971, Azmi was stationed in Chittagong. To escape the military crackdown, he, his wife Monji Khaleda Begum, and several party associates crossed the Ramgarh-Tripura border into India. The group relocated to Cooch Behar in West Bengal, briefly taking refuge at Khaleda's family residence. During their stay, Khaleda's mother presented the couple with gold jewelry as wedding gifts, which Azmi immediately turned over to the party's central fund.

Azmi subsequently re-entered East Pakistan via the Jessore border to participate in the armed resistance. He initially resumed underground organizing in Barisal during the early months of the conflict. On 30 April 1971, the East Bengal Workers' Movement formally founded its armed wing, the Purba Bangla Jatiya Muktibahini (National Freedom Fighters of East Bengal). In July 1971, Azmi was appointed president of the regional coordinating committee for the Savar Front Area, exercising operational leadership over guerrilla units across the Savar and Manikganj districts. Operating under the pseudonym Comrade Taher, he oversaw the expansion of the party's political and military infrastructure in those regions.

== Personal life ==
In 1970, Azmi married Monji Khaleda Begum (known by the party aliases "Bulu" and "Sufia"), a native of Shyamnagar in West Bengal, India. Khaleda Begum became the first female activist to join the Purba Banglar Sarbahara Party and later served as joint editor of its official publication, Lal Pataka. Azmi's political activities created tension with his conservative family. In mid-1970, during a brief meeting in Mirpur, Dhaka, Azmi's mother presented Khaleda with a gold wedding necklace, which Azmi immediately donated to the party treasury. He similarly turned over additional gold jewelry given by Khaleda's mother in West Bengal during the 1971 war.

In mid-1971, amidst the war, Azmi's parents and siblings relocated to Karachi, Pakistan, severing direct communication with him.

== Assassination ==
In August 1971, while serving as the regional commander for the Purba Banglar Sarbahara Party in Savar under the pseudonym Comrade Taher, Azmi was invited to a meeting by Giasuddin (known as Gesu Chairman), a local Awami League leader from Kashimpur Union. Azmi attended the meeting alongside a guerrilla squad comprising cadres Saheed, Palash, Khokon, Enayet, and Monindra. According to party records, the entire squad was poisoned during the meal provided at the meeting and subsequently shot dead; two organizational couriers dispatched to locate them were also captured and killed.

== Legacy ==
In January 1991, on the twentieth anniversary of its formal launching, the Purba Banglar Sarbahara Party published a commemorative magazine titled Shfulingo (Spark), which included an official roll of honor listing its fallen cadres. In this publication, Azmi (listed under his real name and party pseudonym, "Taher") was placed first on the list of martyrs, immediately following party founder Siraj Sikder. Although Shfulingo erroneously recorded Azmi's family as refugees from Hyderabad, India, family records documented by his brother, Razi Azmi, confirmed their origins in Uttar Pradesh. Shfulingo credited Azmi's underground organizational work with expanding the party's network from its initial stages across several districts in East Bengal. The publication acknowledged that his assassination in August 1971 created a long-term leadership vacuum from which the organization struggled to recover, particularly regarding the development of a secondary leadership structure alongside Siraj Sikder.

Following the assassination, party founder Siraj Sikder authored a handwritten eulogy addressed to Azmi's sister in Mohammadpur, Dhaka, comparing Azmi's revolutionary dedication to that of Canadian physician Norman Bethune. Because most of Azmi's family had relocated to Karachi, West Pakistan, in mid-1971 due to wartime conditions, they were initially isolated from direct information regarding his death.

According to memoirs by former party member Raisuddin Ariff, Azmi and his wife, Monji Khaleda Begum, were the primary co-designers of the Sarbahara Party's official flag during their period in the underground. The design, featuring a red circle set against a solid green field to symbolize working-class revolution within East Bengal's agrarian landscape, mirrored the spatial composition of the national flag of Bangladesh adopted in 1972.
