= Rezaul Karim Mannan =

Bangladeshi politician

- রেজাউল করিম মান্নান

Minister of Industries
- In office 9 December 2001 – 29 October 2002
- Prime Minister: Khaleda Zia
- Preceded by: Tofail Ahmed
- Succeeded by: Matiur Rahman Nizami

Member of Bangladesh Parliament
- In office 1991–2008
- Preceded by: Abu Nur Mohammad Bahaul Haq
- Succeeded by: Abdullah-Al-Kaisar
- Constituency: Narayanganj-3

Personal details
- Party: Bangladesh Nationalist Party

Rezaul Karim Mannan (Bengali: রেজাউল করিম মান্নান) is a Bangladesh Nationalist Party politician and a former three-time member of parliament for Narayanganj-3.

== Early life and family ==
Rezaul Karim Mannan was born to a Bengali Muslim family in the village of Ramgovindapur in present-day Shambhupura Union, Sonargaon Upazila, Narayanganj District. He has one son with his wife Suraiya Chowdhury Munni, a lawyer who died on 13 February 2017.

== Career ==
Rezaul Karim was elected to parliament from Narayanganj-3 as a Bangladesh Nationalist Party candidate in 1991, 1996, and 2001.
