= Jampur (disambiguation) =

Jampur is a city in Punjab, Pakistan.

Jampur may also refer to:

== Things named after Jampur, Pakistan ==
- Jampur District
  - Jampur Tehsil
- Jampur railway station

== Other places ==
- Jampur Union, a union council in Narayanganj District, Bangladesh
- Jampur, Uttar Pradesh, a village in Uttar Pradesh, India
- Jampur (crater), a crater on Mars
