= Nazrul Islam Azad =

Bangladeshi politician (born 1976)

- নজরুল ইসলাম আজাদ

Member of the Bangladesh Parliament for Narayanganj-2
- Incumbent
- Assumed office 17 February 2026
- Preceded by: Nazrul Islam Babu

Personal details
- Born: 12 December 1976 (age 49) Araihazar Upazila, Narayanganj District
- Party: Bangladesh Nationalist Party

Nazrul Islam Azad is a Bangladeshi politician. As of March 2026, he is a member of parliament from Narayanganj-2.

== Early life ==
Azad was born on 12 December 1976 at Araihazar Upazila under Narayanganj District.
