= M. A. Awal (Narayanganj politician) =

Bangladeshi politician from Narayanganj

MA Awal
- এম এ আউয়াল

Member of Parliament for Narayanganj-2
- In office 10 July 1986 – 6 December 1990
- Preceded by: Position created
- Succeeded by: Ataur Rahman Khan Angur

Personal details
- Party: Bangladesh Awami League

MA Awal is a Bangladesh Awami League politician and a former Jatiya Sangsad member representing the Narayanganj-2 constituency since its inception until 1990.
