= Alirtek Union =

Alirtek Union আলিরটেক ইউনিয়ন
- Union
- Alirtek Union
- Country: Bangladesh
- Division: Dhaka
- District: Narayanganj
- Upazila: Narayanganj Sadar

Area
  - Total: 24.18 km^{2} (9.34 sq mi)

Population (2011)
  - Total: 23,434
  - Density: 969.1/km^{2} (2,510/sq mi)
- Time zone: UTC+6 (BST)
- Website: alirtekup.narayanganj.gov.bd

Alirtek Union (Bengali: আলিরটেক ইউনিয়ন) is a union parishad in Narayanganj Sadar Upazila, part of Narayanganj District in the Dhaka Division of Bangladesh. It is one of the seven rural unions that, together with the Narayanganj City Corporation area, make up Narayanganj Sadar Upazila.

The union covers an area of 24.18 square kilometres (9.34 sq mi) and, according to the 2011 Bangladesh census, had a population of 23,434. It contains 17 villages and 13 mouzas.

== Geography ==
Alirtek lies in the low-lying, river-fed plains of Narayanganj Sadar Upazila, a part of central Bangladesh laced by the channels of the Dhaleshwari and Shitalakshya rivers. The Dhaleshwari, joined upstream by the Kaliganga, meets the Shitalakshya near Narayanganj, and the resulting network of waterways shapes the flat, seasonally flooded landscape in which the union sits. Like much of the surrounding upazila, the area is close to the sprawling Dhaka–Narayanganj conurbation, one of the most densely settled regions of the country.

== Administration ==
Alirtek is governed as a union parishad, the lowest tier of rural Local Government in Bangladesh, administered by an elected chairman and councillors. For national elections it falls within the Narayanganj-4 parliamentary constituency; in the 2025 delimitation, the Bangladesh Election Commission added the Alirtek and Gognagar union parishads to the constituency, which was redrawn to cover Narayanganj Sadar Upazila.

== Demographics ==
At the 2011 census the union had a population of 23,434, giving a population density of roughly 970 per square kilometre (2,500/sq mi). The wider Narayanganj Sadar Upazila recorded a literacy rate of about 80 per cent and a population that has grown rapidly with the expansion of industry and the nearby metropolitan area. As elsewhere in the district, the population is overwhelmingly Muslim, with a Hindu minority.

== See also ==
- Narayanganj Sadar Upazila
- Union councils of Narayanganj District
