= Noagaon =

Noagaon is the name of several local divisions and villages in Bangladesh:

- Noagaon Union, Brahmanbaria and Noagaon, Sarail (a village within it)
- Noagaon Union, Lakshmipur
- Noagaon Union, Narayanganj
