= Bandar Shahi Mosque =

Mosque in Bandar, Narayanganj, Bangladesh

- বন্দর শাহী মসজিদ
- Location within Bangladesh

Religion
- Affiliation: Islam
- Status: Active

Location
- Location: Narayanganj District, Bangladesh
- Coordinates: 23.612821°N 90.516843°E

Architecture
- Type: Mosque architecture
- Style: Bengal Sultanate
- Founder: Malik al-Muazzam Baba Saleh
- Funded by: Jalaluddin Fateh Shah
- Established: 1482; 544 years ago

Specifications
- Interior area: 6m²
- Dome: 1
- Materials: Brick, Stones

Bandar Shahi Mosque (Bengali: বন্দর শাহী মসজিদ) is a medieval mosque situated at Bandar, Narayanganj district. It was built in 1482 AD by Baba Saleh a high official under Sultan Jalaluddin Fateh Shah (r. 1481–1487).

== History ==
The mosque is located in Khondkartola, a residential area in Bandar Upazila, Narayanganj District, Bangladesh. It is about situated about a half kilometers from the mosque and tomb of Haji Baba Saleh. It was built in 1482 AD (886 AH) by Malik al-Muazzam Baba Saleh, under Sultan Jalaluddin Fateh Shah. Baba Saleh is credited to have also built mosque at Azimnagar (1495 AD), and the Baba Saleh Mosque (1505 AD) during the reign of Alauddin Husain Shah (r. 1494–1519).

== Architecture ==
The mosque is a square-shaped structure measuring 6.20 m (20.3 ft) a side in the interior and 9.70 m (31.8 ft) in the exterior. There are five entrances: three on the eastern facade, one on the northern side, and one on the southern side. The central eastern entrance measures 1.70 m (5.6 ft) in width, while the northern and southern entrances, as well as the two flanking eastern entrances, each measure 1.50 m (4.9 ft) in width. The western wall contains three semicircular mihrab niches, each surmounted by a half-dome. The mosque's interior is dominated by a large hemispherical dome, supported by squinches. The inscription of the Mosque reads:

Allah the most High, says, 'And the places of worship are for Allah [alone]. So invoke not anyone along with Allah' [Quran 72:18]. The Prophet, peace and blessings of Allah be upon him, says, 'He who builds a mosque, Allah will build for him a palace in Paradise' [Hadith). This blessed mosque was built by the great Malik [lord] Baba Saleh, in the reign of the Sultan, son of the Sultan, Jalal al-Dunya wal-Din, Abul Muzaffar Fath Shah the Sultan, son of Mahmud Shah the Sultan, may Allah perpetuate his kingdom and sovereignty; on the 1st of the month of Dhul Qada, in the Hijri year of the Prophet 886 [22 December 1481].

== See also ==
- Islam in Bangladesh
- List of mosques in Bangladesh
- Bengal Sultanate
