= Araihazar Union =

Araihazar Union আড়াইহাজার ইউনিয়ন
- Country: Bangladesh
- Division: Dhaka Division
- District: Narayanganj district
- Upazila: Araihazar Upazila

Government
  - Type: Union Council
- Time zone: UTC+6 (BST)
- Website: Official Website

Araihazar Union (Bengali: আড়াইহাজার ইউনিয়ন) is a Union of Araihazar Upazila in the District and Division of Dhaka, Bangladesh. It has a population of 12,898 men and 12,695 women. The Union has a literacy rate of 47.8 percent.
