= Emdadul Haque Bhuiyan =

Bangladeshi politician

- এমদাদুল হক ভূঁইয়া

Member of Bangladesh Parliament Narayanganj-2
- In office June 1996 – 2001
- Preceded by: Ataur Rahman Khan Angur
- Succeeded by: Ataur Rahman Khan Angur

Personal details
- Political party: Bangladesh Awami League

Emdadul Haque Bhuiyan is a Bangladesh Awami League politician and a former member of parliament for Narayanganj-2.

== Career ==
Bhuiyan was elected to parliament from Narayanganj-2 as a Bangladesh Awami League candidate in 1996.
