= Gognagar Union =

Gognagar Union গোগনগর ইউনিয়ন
- Union
- Gognagar Union
- Country: Bangladesh
- Division: Dhaka
- District: Narayanganj
- Upazila: Narayanganj Sadar

Area
  - Total: 12 km^{2} (4.6 sq mi)

Population (2011)
  - Total: 23,305
  - Density: 1,900/km^{2} (5,000/sq mi)
- Time zone: UTC+6 (BST)
- Website: gognagarup.narayanganj.gov.bd

Gognagar Union (Bengali: গোগনগর ইউনিয়ন) is a union parishad situated at Narayanganj Sadar Upazila, in Narayanganj District, Dhaka Division of Bangladesh. The union has an area of 12 square kilometres (4.6 sq mi) and as of 2001 had a population of 23,305. There are 9 villages and 5 mouzas in the union.
