= Enayetnagar Union =

Enayetnagar Union এনায়েতনগর ইউনিয়ন
- Union
- Enayetnagar Union
- Country: Bangladesh
- Division: Dhaka
- District: Narayanganj
- Upazila: Narayanganj Sadar
- Established: 1960

Area
  - Total: 11.65 km^{2} (4.50 sq mi)

Population (2011)
  - Total: 97,049
  - Density: 8,330/km^{2} (21,580/sq mi)
- Time zone: UTC+6 (BST)
- Website: enayetnagorup.narayanganj.gov.bd

Enayetnagar Union (Bengali: এনায়েতনগর ইউনিয়ন) is a union parishad situated at Narayanganj Sadar Upazila, in Narayanganj District, Dhaka Division of Bangladesh. The union has an area of 11.65 square kilometres (4.50 sq mi) and as of 2001 had a population of 97,049. There are 19 villages and 10 mouzas in the union.
