= Narayanganj-2 =

Constituency of Bangladesh's Jatiya Sangsad

Coordinates: 23.79°N 90.66°E

- Constituency for the Jatiya Sangsad
- District: Narayanganj District
- Division: Dhaka Division
- Electorate: 364,098 (2026)

Current constituency
- Created: 1984
- Party: Bangladesh Nationalist Party
- Member: Nazrul Islam Azad
- ← 204 Narayanganj-1 206 Narayanganj-3 →

Narayanganj-2 is a constituency represented in the Jatiya Sangsad (National Parliament) of Bangladesh since 2026 by Nazrul Islam Azad of the Bangladesh Nationalist Party.

== Boundaries ==
The constituency encompasses Araihazar Upazila.

== History ==
The constituency was created in 1984 from a Dhaka constituency when the former Dhaka District was split into six districts: Manikganj, Munshiganj, Dhaka, Gazipur, Narsingdi, and Narayanganj.

Ahead of the 2008 general election, the Election Commission redrew constituency boundaries to reflect population changes revealed by the 2001 Bangladesh census. The 2008 redistricting altered the boundaries of the constituency.

== Members of Parliament ==
Election	Member	Party
1986	M. A. Awal	Awami League
1988	M. A. Awal	Jatiya Party
1991	Ataur Rahman Khan Angur	Bangladesh Nationalist Party
Feb 1996	Ataur Rahman Khan Angur	Bangladesh Nationalist Party
Jun 1996	Emdadul Haque Bhuiyan	Awami League
2001	Ataur Rahman Khan Angur	Bangladesh Nationalist Party
2008	Nazrul Islam Babu	Awami League
2014	Nazrul Islam Babu	Awami League
2018	Nazrul Islam Babu	Awami League
2024	Nazrul Islam Babu	Awami League
2026	Nazrul Islam Azad	Bangladesh Nationalist Party

== Elections ==
=== Elections in the 2020s ===
General Election 2026: Narayanganj-2
Party	Candidate	Votes	%	±%
BNP	Nazrul Islam Azad	124,291	54.0	N/A
Jamaat	Md. Ilias Mollah	81,054	35.2	N/A
Independent	Ataur Rahman Khan Angur	18,744	8.1	N/A
IAB	Md. Habibullah	5,265	2.3	N/A
CPB	Md. Hafizul Islam	350	0.2	N/A
Bangladesh Republican Party	Md. Abu Hanif Hridoy	227	0.1	N/A
GOP	Kamrul Mia	142	0.1	N/A
Majority		43,237	18.8	N/A
Turnout		230,073	63.2	N/A
Registered electors		364,098		
BNP gain from AL				

=== Elections in the 2010s ===
Nazrul Islam Babu was re-elected unopposed in the 2014 general election after opposition parties withdrew their candidacies in a boycott of the election.

=== Elections in the 2000s ===
General Election 2008: Narayanganj-2
Party	Candidate	Votes	%	±%
AL	Nazrul Islam Babu	117,435	59.3	+18.0
BNP	A. M. Badruzzaman Khan	78,675	39.7	−17.7
IAB	Md. Habibullah	1,671	0.8	N/A
Independent	Emdadul Haque Bhuiyan	377	0.2	N/A
Majority		38,760	19.6	−3.4
Turnout		198,158	91.3	+10.8
AL gain from BNP				

General Election 2001: Narayanganj-2
Party	Candidate	Votes	%	±%
BNP	Ataur Rahman Khan Angur	89,757	57.4	+11.0
AL	Emdadul Haque Bhuiyan	64,482	41.3	−5.5
IJOF	Mamtaz Hasan	1,330	0.9	N/A
Independent	Khokon Jasim	419	0.3	N/A
CPB	Md. Hafizul Islam	271	0.2	N/A
Majority		25,275	16.2	+15.8
Turnout		156,259	80.5	−2.3
BNP gain from AL				

=== Elections in the 1990s ===
General Election June 1996: Narayanganj-2
Party	Candidate	Votes	%	±%
AL	Emdadul Haque Bhuiyan	58,947	46.8	+26.3
BNP	Ataur Rahman Khan Angur	58,388	46.4	+12.2
JP(E)	Md. Alamgir Shikdar Loton	4,238	3.4	+3.0
Jamaat	Ilias Molla	3,251	2.6	−3.5
Zaker Party	Md. Majibur Rahman Bhuiyan	661	0.5	−6.7
Gano Forum	Qazi Md. Sajawar Hossain	243	0.2	N/A
Islamic Sashantantrik Andolan	Abu Bakar Siddique Khan	238	0.2	N/A
Majority		559	0.4	−2.3
Turnout		125,966	82.8	+15.8
AL gain from BNP				

General Election 1991: Narayanganj-2
Party	Candidate	Votes	%	±%
BNP	Ataur Rahman Khan Angur	38,400	34.2	
Independent	Emdadul Haque Bhuiyan	35,353	31.5	
AL	Md. Mamtaz Hossein	23,047	20.5	
Zaker Party	Md. Zakir Hossein	8,056	7.2	
Jamaat	Ilias Molla	6,830	6.1	
JP(E)	M. A. Awal	404	0.4	
CPB	Md. Hafizul Islam	123	0.1	
Jatiyatabadi Gonotantrik Chashi Dal	Md. Rup Miah	113	0.1	
Majority		3,047	2.7	
Turnout		112,326	67.0	
BNP gain from AL				
