= Abdullah-Al-Kaisar =

Bangladeshi politician

Abdullah Al-Kaisar
- আবদুল্লাহ আল কায়সার

Member of the Bangladesh Parliament for Narayanganj-3
- In office 30 January 2024 – 6 August 2024
- Preceded by: Liyakot Hossain Khoka
- In office 25 January 2009 – 24 January 2014
- Preceded by: Rezaul Karim Mannan

Personal details
- Born: April 7, 1973 (age 52)
- Political party: Bangladesh Awami League

Abdullah Al-Kaisar (born 7 April 1973) is a Bangladesh Awami League politician and a former Jatiya Sangsad member representing the Narayanganj-3 constituency.

== Early life ==
Abdullah Al-Kaisar was born on 7 April 1973 to a Bengali Muslim political family in Sonargaon, Narayanganj District. His father, Abul Hasnat, was the president of the Awami League's Sonargaon branch. His mother, Mamtaz Begum, was female correspondent of the Sonargaon Awami League. He has a B.S.S degree.

== Career ==
Abdullah was elected to parliament from Narayanganj-3 as a Bangladesh Awami League candidate in 2008. He re-elected during 2024 parliamentary election.
