= Musapur Union =

Musapur Union may refer to:

- Musapur Union, Bandar, a union in Bandar Upazila
- Musapur Union, Raipura, a union in Raipura Upazila
