= Liyakot Hossain Khoka =

Bangladeshi politician

- লিয়াকত হোসেন খোকা

Member of Parliament for Narayanganj-3
- In office 29 January 2014 – 7 January 2024
- Preceded by: Abdullah-Al-Kaisar
- Succeeded by: Abdullah-Al-Kaisar

Personal details
- Born: 31 December 1964 (age 60)
- Party: Jatiya Party

Liyakot Hossain Khoka (born 31 December 1964) is a Bangladeshi politician and former member of the Bangladesh Parliament representing the Narayanganj-3 constituency.

== Career ==
Khoka was elected to parliament from Narayanganj-3 as a Jatiya Party candidate in 2014 and re-elected in 2018.

=== Controversy ===
On 4 November 2020, Khoka said he would "gladly accept the death penalty after he kills Emmanuel Macron, the president of France, for insulting the Prophet Muhammad". He also appealed to the prime minister of Bangladesh to sever diplomatic ties with France.
