= Baktaboli Union =

Baktaboli Union বক্তাবলী ইউনিয়ন
- Union
- Baktaboli Union
- Location within Bangladesh
- Country: Bangladesh
- Division: Dhaka
- District: Narayanganj
- Upazila: Narayanganj Sadar

Area
  - Total: 15 km^{2} (5.8 sq mi)

Population (2011)
  - Total: 44,434
  - Density: 3,000/km^{2} (7,700/sq mi)
- Time zone: UTC+6 (BST)
- Website: baktaboliup.narayanganj.gov.bd

Baktaboli Union (Bengali: বক্তাবলী ইউনিয়ন) is a union parishad situated at Narayanganj Sadar Upazila, in Narayanganj District, Rangpur Division of Bangladesh. The union has an area of 15 square kilometres (5.8 sq mi) and as of 2001 had a population of 44,434. There are 22 villages and 7 mouzas in the union.
