= Narayanganj High School =

Coordinates: 23°45′54″N 90°22′4″E

Narayanganj High School & College
- নারায়ণগঞ্জ হাই স্কুল অ্যান্ড কলেজ

Location
- 25-26 Sirajdullah Road; Narayanganj; Bangladesh

Information
- Established: 1885
- School code: 112420
- Principal: Mahamudul Hasan Bhuiyan
- Grades: 1–12
- Gender: Boys and girls
- Age range: 5–18
- Language: Bengali
- Campus size: 5 Acre
- Campus type: City
- Affiliation: Board of Intermediate and Secondary Education, Dhaka
- Website: www.narayanganjhighschoolandcollege.edu.bd

Narayanganj High School and College (formerly known as Narayanganj High School), is one of the oldest educational institutions of Narayanganj. It was established in 1885.

Narayanganj High School and College is a private school located in Kalir Bazar, Narayanganj Sadar Upazila, Bangladesh. The school offers education for students ranging from first grade to twelfth grade (approximately ages 6 to 18). Narayanganj High School is one of the largest schools in the city of Narayanganj.

== History ==
At first, Narayanganj High School was an Anglo-Vernacular school. It became an ME school in 1876 and finally it was promoted to high school in 1885. The school was located on the bank of the river Sitalakhya near Netaiganj from 1885 to 1907. In those days the school used to sit in a fenced house.

The school was shifted to its present location from Netaiganj in 1907 with the increase of students. The sub-divisional officer's bungalow was there at that time and the bungalow was also shifted to its present site in the same year. There was a pond behind the school named 'Ornamental Tank'. The pond is filled up now and some buildings have been constructed.

== Campus ==
Narayanganj High School is located on the prime location of Narayanganj District. The campus is in southeast Narayanganj at S. K. Road, just opposite the Narayanganj Rail Junction. The campus consists of dormitories, teachers' quarters, staff quarters, an auditorium, an administrative building, and a full-size football field.

A monument has been built in front of Main Building, to commemorate those killed during the Bengali language movement demonstrations of 1952. The Language Movement was a political effort in East Pakistan, advocating the recognition of the Bengali language as an official language of Pakistan.

=== Buildings ===
With three buildings (including the newly built House), one of which is the Main Building, it is one of the largest school in the Narayanganj Sadar Upazila The school has one field and playgrounds. Two buildings known as Academic Buildings are used for academic purposes. Academic Building 1, is located at the northeast side; and Academic Building 2, is located at southeast corner of the campus.
