= Pirijpur Union =

Pirijpur Union pirojpur
- Union
- Country: Narayanganj Bangladesh
- Division: Dhaka Division
- District: Narayanganj District
- Upazilas: Sonargaon Upazila

Government
  - Chairman: Masudur Rahman Masum
  - School And College: Meghna Shilpa Nagari School and College

Area
  - Total: 17.2 km^{2} (6.6 sq mi)

Population (2001)
  - Total: 32,461
- Time zone: UTC+6 (BST)

Pirijpur Union is a union, the smallest administrative body of Bangladesh, located in Sonargaon Upazila, Narayanganj District, Bangladesh. The total population is 32,461. It is situated alongside Mugrapara Chowrasta and Meghna bridge. Meghna River is located on East side. It is the last union of Sonargaon Upazila. After this Union Munshiganj Gazaria and Cumilla subdistrict starts. Pirijpur Union's bus stop name is Meghna bridge toll plaza or, Meghna bridge counter.
