= Aminpur Union =

Aminpur
- Union
- Country: Narayanganj Bangladesh
- Division: Dhaka Division
- District: Narayanganj District
- Upazilas: Sonargaon Upazila

Area
  - Total: 9.1 km^{2} (3.5 sq mi)

Population (2001)
  - Total: 23,627
- Time zone: UTC+6 (BST)

Aminpur is a union, the smallest administrative body of Bangladesh, located in Sonargaon Upazila, Narayanganj District, Bangladesh. The total population is 23,627.

In April 2020, the family planning inspector of Aminpur Union was suspended for violating the COVID-19 lockdown by holding a wedding ceremony for himself.
