= Fatehpur Union (Araihazar) =

Fatehpur Union ফতেপুর ইউনিয়ন
- Location within Bangladesh
- Coordinates: 23.7846°N 90.6659°E
- Country: Bangladesh
- Division: Dhaka Division
- District: Narayanganj district
- Upazila: Araihazar Upazila

Government
  - Type: Union Council
- Time zone: UTC+6 (BST)

Fatehpur Union (Bengali: ফতেপুর ইউনিয়ন) is a union parishad of Araihazar Upazila in Narayanganj District of the Division of Dhaka, Bangladesh. It has a population of 10,556 men and 10,278 women. The union has a literacy rate of 36.4 per cent.
