= Satgram Union =

Satgram Union সাতগ্রাম ইউনিয়ন
- Location within Bangladesh
- Coordinates: 23.8477°N 90.6298°E
- Country: Bangladesh
- Division: Dhaka Division
- District: Narayanganj district
- Upazila: Araihazar Upazila

Government
  - Type: Union Council
- Time zone: UTC+6 (BST)

Satgram Union (Bengali: সাতগ্রাম ইউনিয়ন) is a union parishad of Araihazar Upazila in Narayanganj District of the Division of Dhaka, Bangladesh. It has a population of 21,124 men and 20,607 women. The union has a literacy rate of 47.2 per cent.
