= Musapur Union, Bandar =

Musapur Union মুছাপুর ইউনিয়ন
- Location within Bangladesh
- Coordinates: 23.6503°N 90.5645°E
- Country: Bangladesh
- Division: Dhaka Division
- District: Narayanganj district
- Upazila: Bandar Upazila

Government
  - Type: Union Council
- Time zone: UTC+6 (BST)

Musapur Union (Bengali: মুছাপুর ইউনিয়ন) is a union parishad of Bandar Upazila in Narayanganj District of the Division of Dhaka, Bangladesh. It has a population of 13,171 men and 12,762 women. The union has a literacy rate of 47.6 per cent.
