= Bandar Union =

Bandar Union বন্দর ইউনিয়ন
- Country: Bangladesh
- Division: Dhaka Division
- District: Narayanganj district
- Upazila: Bandar Upazila

Government
  - Type: Union Council
- Time zone: UTC+6 (BST)

Bandar Union (Bengali: বন্দর ইউনিয়ন) is a Union of Bandar Upazila in the District and Division of Dhaka, Bangladesh. It has a population of 14,962 men and 14,616 women. The Union has a literacy rate of 55.4 per cent.
