= Khagakanda Union =

Khagakanda Union খাদকান্দা ইউনিয়ন
- Location within Bangladesh
- Coordinates: 23.7257°N 90.6767°E
- Country: Bangladesh
- Division: Dhaka Division
- District: Narayanganj district
- Upazila: Araihazar Upazila

Government
  - Type: Union Council
- Time zone: UTC+6 (BST)

Khagakanda Union (Bengali: খাদকান্দা ইউনিয়ন) is a union parishad of Araihazar Upazila in Narayanganj District of the Division of Dhaka, Bangladesh. It has a population of 11,826 men and 12,974 women. The union has a literacy rate of 36.3 per cent.
