= Bara Dih =

Bara Dih Baradih
- Village
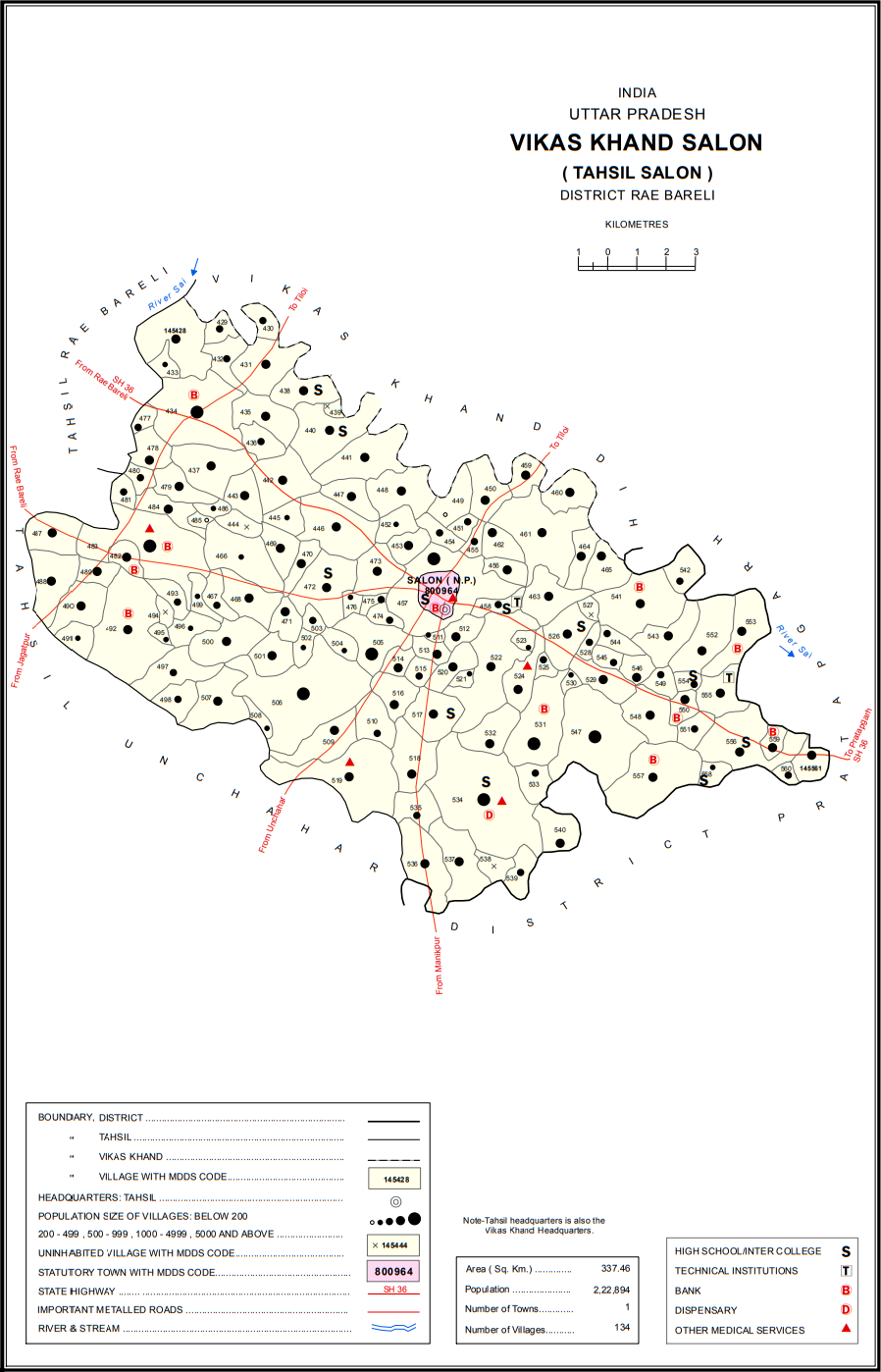
- Map showing Bara Dih (#145428) in Salon CD block

- Location in Uttar Pradesh, India
- Coordinates: 26.108764°N 81.356212°E
- Country India: India
- State: Uttar Pradesh
- District: Raebareli

Area
  - Total: 4.427 km^{2} (1.709 sq mi)

Population (2011)
  - Total: 2,248
  - Density: 507.8/km^{2} (1,315/sq mi)

Languages
  - Official: Hindi
- Time zone: UTC+5:30 (IST)
- Vehicle registration: UP-35

Bara Dih, also spelled Baradih, is a village in Salon block of Rae Bareli district, Uttar Pradesh, India. It is located 3 km northwest of Salon, the block headquarters, close to the point where the Chob stream joins the Sai river. As of 2011, Bara Dih has a population of 2,248 people, in 386 households.

The 1961 census recorded Bara Dih as comprising 7 hamlets, with a total population of 894 people (480 male and 414 female), in 179 households and 173 physical houses. The area of the village was given as 1,177 acres and it had a post office at that point.

The 1981 census recorded Bara Dih (as "Baradeeh") as having a population of 1,330 people, in 309 households, and having an area of 442.73 hectares. The main staple foods were given as wheat and rice.
