= Kala Paharia Union =

Kalapaharia Union কালাপাহাড়িয়া ইউনিয়ন
- Location within Bangladesh
- Coordinates: 23.6950°N 90.7181°E
- Country: Bangladesh
- Division: Dhaka Division
- District: Narayanganj district
- Upazila: Araihazar Upazila

Government
  - Type: Union Council
  - Chairman: Faizul Haque Dalim
- Time zone: UTC+6 (BST)

Kalapaharia Union (Bengali: কালাপাহাড়িয়া ইউনিয়ন) is a union parishad of Araihazar Upazila in the Narayanganj district and division of Dhaka, Bangladesh. It has a population of 27000 men and 23000 women. The union has a literacy rate of 56 per cent.
