= Kalagachhia Union =

Kalagachhia Union কলাগাছিয়া ইউনিয়ন
- Location within Bangladesh
- Coordinates: 23.5957°N 90.5342°E
- Country: Bangladesh
- Division: Dhaka Division
- District: Narayanganj district
- Upazila: Bandar Upazila

Government
  - Type: Union Council
- Time zone: UTC+6 (BST)

Kalagachhia Union (Bengali: কলাগাছিয়া ইউনিয়ন) is a union parishad of Bandar Upazila in the district and division of Dhaka, Bangladesh. It has a population of 21,580 men and 21,976 women. The union has a literacy rate of 60.5 per cent.
