= Baradi Union =

- Union
- Location in Bangladesh
- Country: Narayanganj Bangladesh
- Division: Dhaka Division
- District: Narayanganj District
- Upazilas: Sonargaon Upazila

Area
  - Total: 13.6 km^{2} (5.3 sq mi)

Population (2001)
  - Total: 24,286
- Time zone: UTC+6 (BST)

Baradi Union is a union parishad, the smallest administrative body of Bangladesh, located in Sonargaon Upazila, Narayanganj District, Bangladesh. The total population is 24,286.
