= Sadasardi Union =

Sadasardi Union সাদাসর্দি ইউনিয়ন
- Country: Bangladesh
- Division: Dhaka Division
- District: Narayanganj district
- Upazila: Araihazar Upazila

Government
  - Type: Union Council
- Time zone: UTC+6 (BST)

Sadasardi Union (Bengali: সাদাসর্দি ইউনিয়ন) is a Union of Araihazar Upazila in the District and Division of Dhaka, Bangladesh. It has a population of 20,416 men and 19,199 women. The Union has a literacy rate of 46.3 per cent.
