= Haizadi Union =

Haizadi Union হাইজাদী ইউনিয়ন
- Location within Bangladesh
- Coordinates: 23.7481°N 90.6659°E
- Country: Bangladesh
- Division: Dhaka Division
- District: Narayanganj district
- Upazila: Araihazar Upazila

Government
  - Type: Union Council
- Time zone: UTC+6 (BST)

Haizadi Union (Bengali: হাইজাদী ইউনিয়ন) is a union parishad of Araihazar Upazila in the District and Division of Dhaka, Bangladesh. It has a population of 12,317 men and 13,225 women. The union has a literacy rate of 38.6 per cent.
