= Baradiya =

Village in Gujarat, India

Baradiya is a village in Visavadar taluka of Junagadh district, in the Indian state of Gujarat.

== Demographics ==
As of the 2011 Census of India, Baradiya had a population of 2,710 in 586 households, with 1,396 males and 1,314 females. The sex ratio was 941. Children aged 0–6 numbered 226. The literacy rate was 74.7% (81.0% for males and 67.99% for females).

== Economy ==
Of the 1,128 residents recorded as workers, the majority were engaged in agriculture, including 587 cultivators and 273 agricultural labourers.
