= Duptara Union =

Duptara Union দুপ্তারা ইউনিয়ন
- Location of Shovna Union in Bangladesh
- Coordinates: 23.7897°N 90.6060°E
- Country: Bangladesh
- Division: Dhaka Division
- District: Narayanganj district
- Upazila: Araihazar Upazila

Government
  - Type: Union Council
- Time zone: UTC+6 (BST)
- Website: duptaraup.narayanganj.gov.bd

Duptara Union (Bengali: দুপ্তারা ইউনিয়ন) is a union parishad of Araihazar Upazila in Narayanganj District, Dhaka Division, Bangladesh.
