= Jampur, Uttar Pradesh =

Village in Uttar Pradesh, India

Jampur
- Village
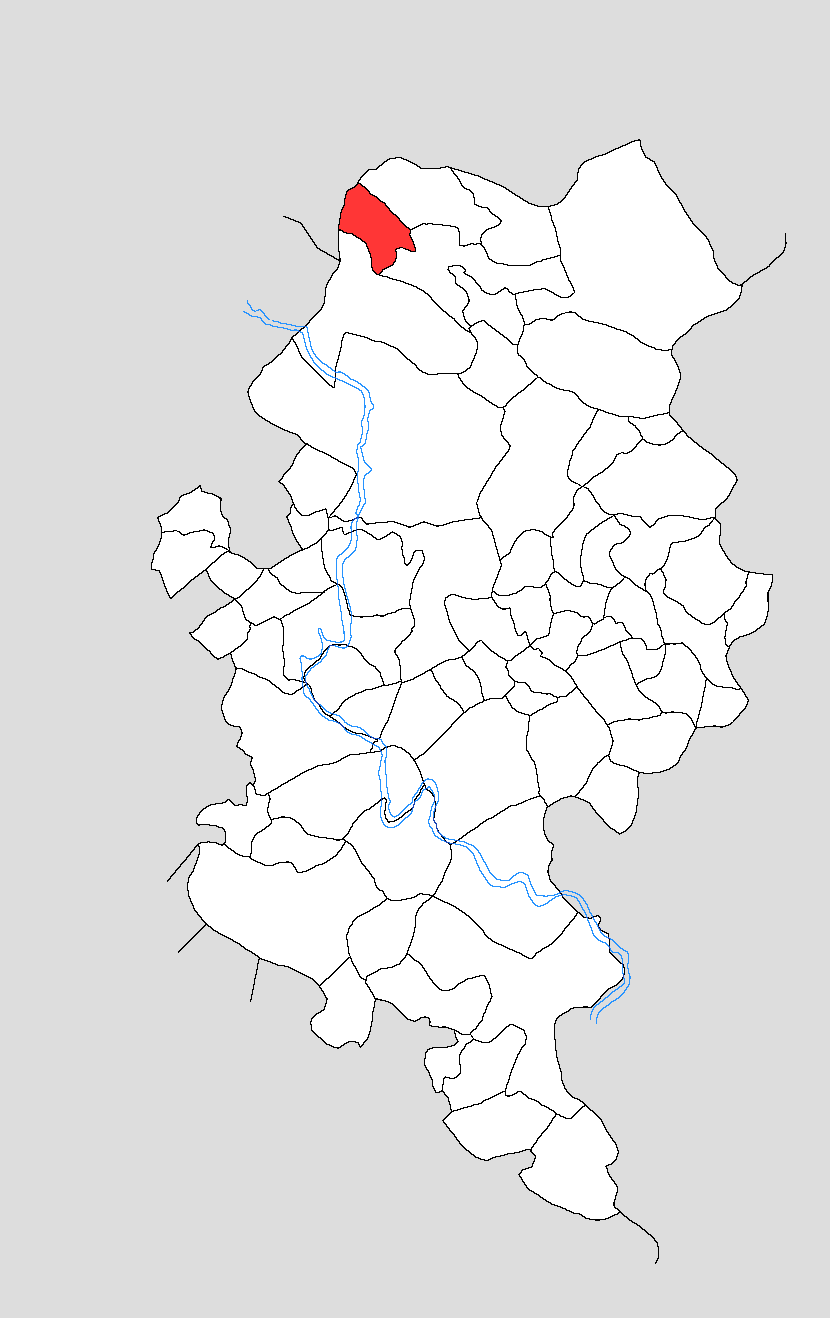
- Map showing Jampur in Kotla block

- Location in Uttar Pradesh, India
- Coordinates: 27.3585°N 78.3903°E
- Country: India
- State: Uttar Pradesh
- District: Firozabad
- Tehsil: Firozabad

Area
  - Total: 3.739 km^{2} (1.444 sq mi)

Population (2011)
  - Total: 2,551
  - Density: 682.3/km^{2} (1,767/sq mi)
- Time zone: UTC+5:30 (IST)

Jampur (Jāmpur) is a village in Kotla block of Firozabad district, Uttar Pradesh, India. As of 2011, it had a population of 2,551, in 420 households.

== Demographics ==
As of 2011, Jampur had a population of 2,551, in 420 households. This population was 52.4% male (1,337) and 47.6% female (1,214). The 0-6 age group numbered 398 (200 male and 198 female), making up 15.6% of the total population. 614 residents were members of Scheduled Castes, or 24.1% of the total.

The 1981 census recorded Jampur as having a population of 1,664 people (898 male and 766 female), in 321 households and 309 physical houses.

The 1961 census recorded Jampur as comprising 3 hamlets, with a total population of 1,159 people (650 male and 509 female), in 208 households and 150 physical houses. The area of the village was given as 964 acres.

== Infrastructure ==
As of 2011, Jampur had 1 primary school; it did not have any healthcare facilities. Drinking water was provided by tap, hand pump, and tube well/borehole; there were no public toilets. The village did not have a post office or public library; there was at least some access to electricity for all purposes. Streets were made of both kachcha and pakka materials.
