= Dhamgar Union =

Dhamgar Union ধামগড় ইউনিয়ন
- Location within Bangladesh
- Coordinates: 23.6704°N 90.5358°E
- Country: Bangladesh
- Division: Dhaka Division
- District: Narayanganj district
- Upazila: Bandar Upazila

Government
  - Type: Union Council
- Time zone: UTC+6 (BST)

Dhamgar Union (Bengali: ধামগড় ইউনিয়ন) is a union parishad of Bandar Upazila in Narayanganj District of the Division of Dhaka, Bangladesh. It has a population of 13,362 men and 12,848 women. The union has a literacy rate of 54.3 per cent.
