= Kashipur Union, Narayanganj Sadar =

Kashipur Union কাশীপুর ইউনিয়ন
- Union
- Enayetnagar Union
- Country: Bangladesh
- Division: Dhaka
- District: Narayanganj
- Upazila: Narayanganj Sadar

Area
  - Total: 11.65 km^{2} (4.50 sq mi)

Population (2011)
  - Total: 55,187
  - Density: 4,737/km^{2} (12,270/sq mi)
- Time zone: UTC+6 (BST)
- Website: kashipurup.narayanganj.gov.bd

Kashipur Union (Bengali: কাশীপুর ইউনিয়ন) is a union parishad situated at Narayanganj Sadar Upazila, in Narayanganj District, Dhaka Division of Bangladesh. The union has an area of 11.65 square kilometres (4.50 sq mi) and as of 2001 had a population of 55,187. There are 20 villages and 4 mouzas in the union.
