= Noagaon Union, Narayanganj =

Noagaon Union
- Union
- Country: Bangladesh
- Division: Dhaka Division
- District: Narayanganj District
- Upazilas: Sonargaon Upazila

Area
  - Total: 12.4 km^{2} (4.8 sq mi)

Population (2001)
  - Total: 18,258
- Time zone: UTC+6 (BST)

Noagaon Union is a union, the smallest administrative body of Bangladesh, located in Sonargaon Upazila, Narayanganj District, Bangladesh. The total population as of 2001 was 18,258.
