= Nazrul Islam Babu =

Bangladeshi politician

- নজরুল ইসলাম বাবু

Member of the Bangladesh Parliament for Narayanganj-2
- In office 25 January 2009 – 5 August 2024
- Preceded by: Ataur Rahman Khan Angur

General Secretary of Bangladesh Chatra League
- In office 2002–2006
- Preceded by: Ajay Kar Khokon
- Succeeded by: Mahfuzul Haider Chowdhury

Personal details
- Born: 10 March 1967 (age 59)
- Party: Bangladesh Awami League
- Spouse: Sayema Islam Eva
- Children: 1

Nazrul Islam Babu (Bengali: মোঃ নজরুল ইসলাম বাবু; born 10 March 1967) is a Bangladesh Awami League politician and the incumbent member of parliament for Narayanganj-2.

== Early life ==
Babu was born on 10 March 1967. He was general secretary of the Bangladesh Chhatra League, the student wing of the Awami League, from 2002 to 2006.

== Career ==
Babu was a leader of the Bangladesh Chhatra League.

Babu was elected to Parliament in 2008 from Narayanganj-2 as a candidate of the Awami League. He received 117,435 votes while his nearest rival, A. M. Badruzzaman Khan of the Bangladesh Nationalist Party, received 78,675. He represents Araihazar Upazila. He was member of the Member of the parliamentary standing committee on Shipping Ministry.

Babu was re-elected in 2014 from Narayanganj-2 unopposed after the main opposition parties boycotted the elected.

Babu was re-elected in 2018 from Narayanganj-2 as a candidate of the Awami League. He received 232,722 votes while his nearest rival, Nazrul Islam Azad of the Bangladesh Nationalist Party, 5,012 votes.

In October 2019, the National Board of Revenue sough bank information from Babu and his wife. He owns M/S Babu Enterprise, M/S Star Trading Co, M/S Suchana Dying Printing Weaving Industries, and Suchana Dyeing and Printing Limited.

In 2020, Babu led a parliamentary enquiry into alleged corruption in the purchase of books for Sheikh Mujib corners in government primary schools across Bangladesh.
