= Uchitpur Union =

Uchitpur Union উচিৎপুরা ইউনিয়ন
- Location within Bangladesh
- Coordinates: 23.7494°N 90.6725°E
- Country: Bangladesh
- Division: Dhaka Division
- District: Narayanganj district
- Upazila: Araihazar Upazila

Government
  - Type: Union Council
- Time zone: UTC+6 (BST)

Uchitpur Union (Bengali: উচিৎপুরা ইউনিয়ন) is a union parishad of Araihazar Upazila in Narayanganj District of the Division of Dhaka, Bangladesh. It has a population of 12,317 men and 13,225 women. The union has a literacy rate of 38.6 per cent.
