= Brahmandi Bazar Union =

Brahmandi Union ব্রাক্ষন্দী ইউনিয়ন
- Location within Bangladesh
- Coordinates: 23.7802°N 90.6326°E
- Country: Bangladesh
- Division: Dhaka Division
- District: Narayanganj district
- Upazila: Araihazar Upazila

Government
  - Type: Union Council
- Time zone: UTC+6 (BST)

Brahmandi Union (Bengali: ব্রাক্ষন্দী ইউনিয়ন) is a union parishad of Araihazar Upazila in Narayanganj District of the Division of Dhaka, Bangladesh. It has a population of 24,570 men and 24,429 women. The union has a literacy rate of 52.3 percent.
