= Government Shaheed Suhrawardy College =

Public college in Dhaka, Bangladesh

- সরকারী শহীদ সোহ্‌রাওয়ার্দী কলেজ
- Crest of Government Shaheed Suhrawardy College
- Former name: Quaid-i-Azam College
- Type: Public
- Established: November 11, 1949; 76 years ago
- Parent institution: Dhaka Central University
- Affiliations: Dhaka Education Board
- Chancellor: President of Bangladesh
- Vice-Chancellor: Md. Lutfor Rahaman
- Principal: Dr Kakali Mukhopadhyay
- Location: 36-37, Municipality Street, Luxmibazar, Old Dhaka, Dhaka, 1100, Bangladesh
- Campus: 1 acre (0.40 ha); Urban
- Website: https://gssc.college.gov.bd/

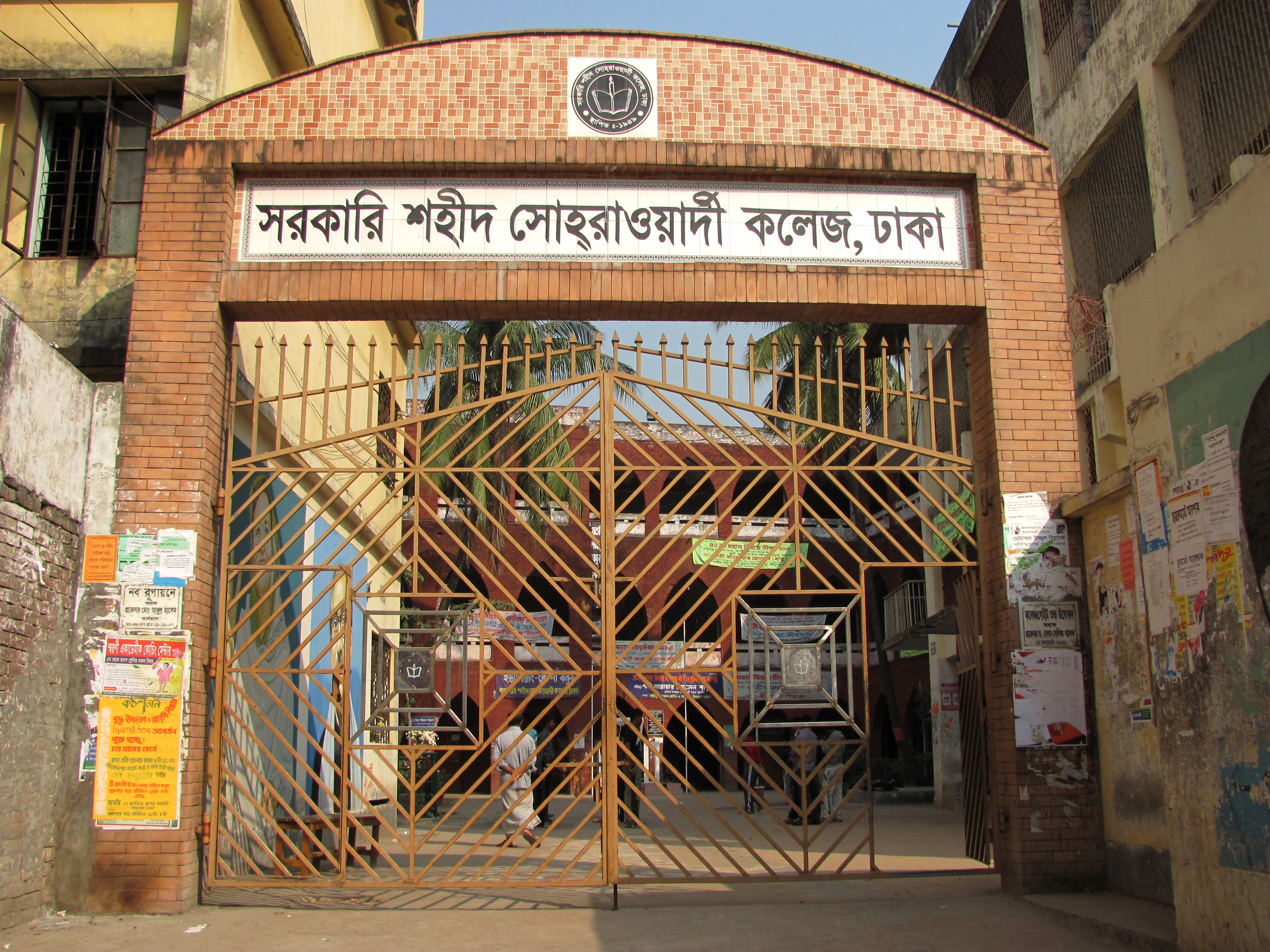
College entrance gate

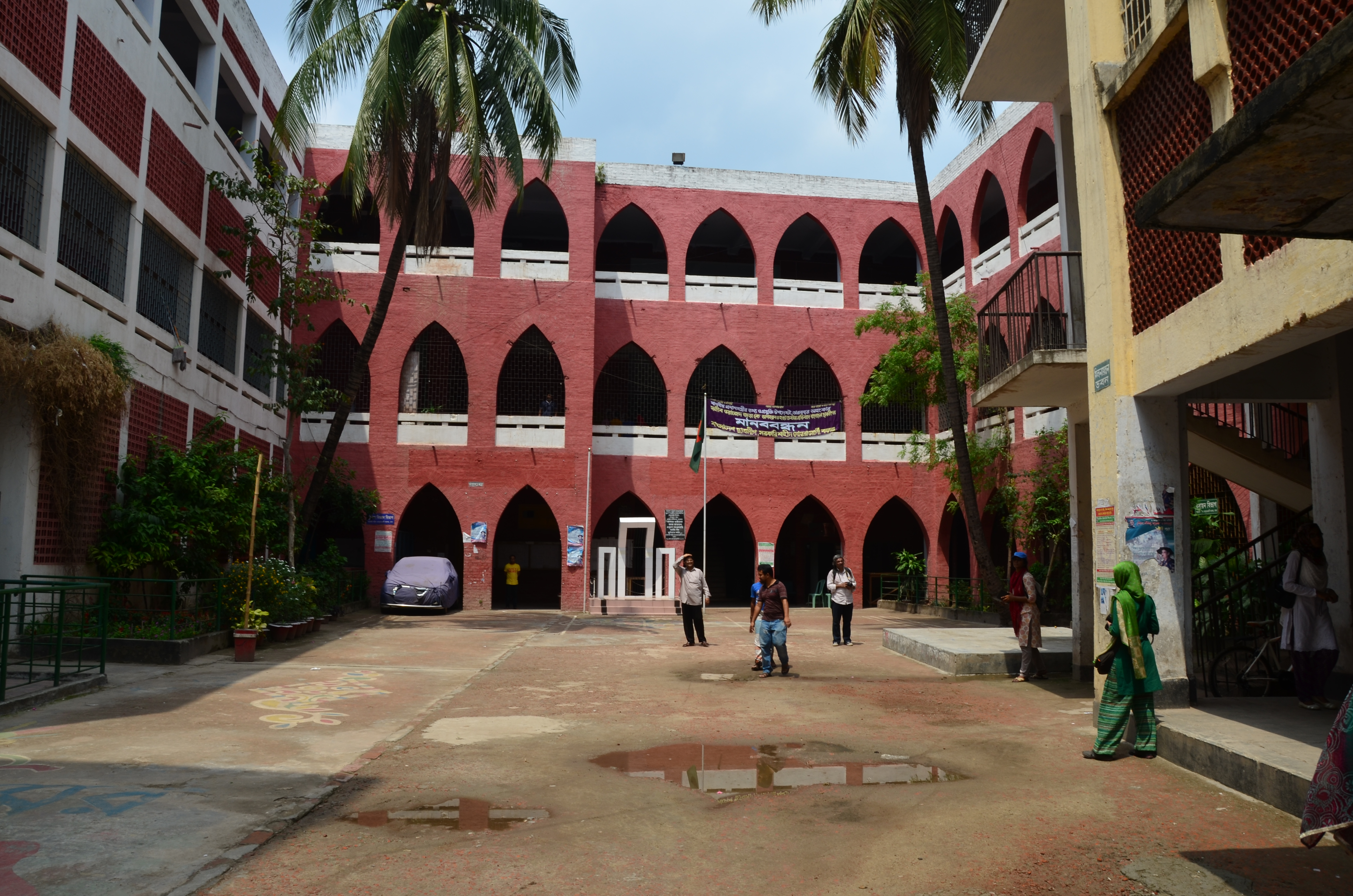
Main campus

Government Shaheed Suhrawardy College (Bengali: সরকারি শহীদ সোহরাওয়ার্দী কলেজ) (Dhaka Central University Attached: Government Shaheed Suhrawardy College, Dhaka) is a public college in Luxmibazar near Bahadurshah Park of Old Dhaka, Bangladesh. It offers higher-secondary education (HSC), bachelor's degree and master's degree programs that were affiliated to the University of Dhaka from February 2017 to January 2025.

== History ==
Government Shaheed Suhrawardy College was established on 11 November 1949 as the Quaid-i-Azam College. Professor Syed Zahir Ahsan of the Bihar Provincial Service became the first principal of the college in 1950. On 15 April 1954, A. M. A. R. Fatemi became principal of the college.

The Governor of East Pakistan, A. K. Fazlul Huq, inaugurated science courses in 1956. Governor of East Pakistan, Zakir Husain, inaugurated graduate courses at the college.

After the Independence of Bangladesh in 1971, the college was renamed as Shaheed Suhrawardy College. In 1984, the college was nationalized and the word government added to the name.

In September 2005, the president of the college unit of the Jatiyatabadi Chhatra Dal was gunned down in the college.

Government Shaheed Suhrawardy College is one of seven affiliated colleges under the University of Dhaka since 2017. The other affiliated colleges are Begum Badrunnesa Government Girls' College, Dhaka College, Eden Mohila College, Government Bangla College, Government Titumir College, and Kabi Nazrul Government College. The affiliation has drawn criticism from students of the University of Dhaka and the affiliated colleges who claim that the University of Dhaka does not have the manpower to run the seven colleges.

== Academics ==
=== Faculty of Arts ===
- Bangla
- English
- History
- Philosophy
- Islamic History and Culture
- Islamic Studies

=== Faculty of Social Science ===
- Economics
- Political Science
- Social Work

=== Faculty of Science ===
- Physics
- Chemistry
- Zoology
- Botany
- Soil Science
- Mathematics
- Geography and Environment

=== Faculty of Business Administration ===
- Accounting
- Management

International Club:

- Leo Club of Government Shahid Suhrawardy College

Since 24 October 2024

Founder: Leo Md. Eleyas (Botany 2018-2019)

Join now: https://www.facebook.com/leoclubgssc
