= Ataur Rahman Khan Angur =

Bangladeshi politician from Narayanganj

- আতাউর রহমান খান আঙ্গুর

Member of Bangladesh Parliament
- In office 1st and 2nd
- In office 1991 – Jun 1996
- Preceded by: MA Awal
- Succeeded by: Emdadul Haque Bhuiyan
- In office 3rd
- In office 2001–2006
- Preceded by: Emdadul Haque Bhuiyan
- Succeeded by: Nazrul Islam Babu

Personal details
- Party: Bangladesh Nationalist Party

Ataur Rahman Khan Angur is a Bangladesh Nationalist Party politician and a former member of parliament for Narayanganj-2.

== Career ==
Angur was elected to parliament from Narayanganj-2 as a Bangladesh Nationalist Party candidate in 2001.
