= Abu Nur Mohammad Bahaul Haq =

Bangladeshi politician

Member of Bangladesh Parliament
- In office 1988–1990

Personal details
- Party: Jatiya Party (Ershad)

Abu Nur Mohammad Bahaul Haq (Bengali: আবু নূর মোহাম্মদ বাহাউল হক) is a Jatiya Party (Ershad) politician in Bangladesh and a former member of parliament for Narayanganj-3.

== Career ==
Bahaul Haq was elected to parliament from Narayanganj-3 as a Jatiya Party candidate in 1988.
