= Bishnandi Union =

Bishnandi Union বিশনন্দী ইউনিয়ন
- Location within Bangladesh
- Coordinates: 23.7857°N 90.7302°E
- Country: Bangladesh
- Division: Dhaka Division
- District: Narayanganj district
- Upazila: Araihazar Upazila

Government
  - Type: Union Council
- Time zone: UTC+6 (BST)

Bishnandi Union (Bengali: বিশনন্দী ইউনিয়ন) is a union parishad of Araihazar Upazila in Narayanganj District of the division of Dhaka, Bangladesh. It has a population of 18,180 men and 18,241 women. The union has a literacy rate of 28.8 per cent.
