= Baradi, Maharashtra =

Village in Maharashtra

Baradi
- village
- Location in Maharashtra, India Baradi (India)
- Coordinates: 20.1199843°N 72.8101887°E
- Country: India
- State: Maharashtra
- District: Palghar
- Taluka: Talasari
- Elevation: 49 m (161 ft)

Population (2011)
  - Total: 3,418
- Time zone: UTC+5:30 (IST)
- 2011 census code: 551560

Baradi is a village in the Palghar district of Maharashtra, India. It is located in the Talasari taluka.

== Demographics ==
According to the 2011 census of India, Baradi has 697 households. The effective literacy rate (i.e. the literacy rate of population excluding children aged 6 and below) is 53.78%.

Demographics (2011 Census)
	Total	Male	Female
Population	3418	1666	1752
Children aged below 6 years	564	282	282
Scheduled caste	0	0	0
Scheduled tribe	3386	1647	1739
Literates	1535	897	638
Workers (all)	1611	893	718
Main workers (total)	907	607	300
Main workers: Cultivators	325	220	105
Main workers: Agricultural labourers	348	244	104
Main workers: Household industry workers	2	2	0
Main workers: Other	232	141	91
Marginal workers (total)	704	286	418
Marginal workers: Cultivators	34	13	21
Marginal workers: Agricultural labourers	607	239	368
Marginal workers: Household industry workers	4	1	3
Marginal workers: Others	59	33	26
Non-workers	1807	773	1034
