= Jampur Union =

- Union
- Country: Narayanganj Bangladesh
- Division: Dhaka Division
- District: Narayanganj District
- Upazilas: Sonargaon Upazila

Area
  - Total: 22 km^{2} (8.5 sq mi)

Population (2001)
  - Total: 33,457
- Time zone: UTC+6 (BST)

Jampur Union is a union, the smallest administrative body of Bangladesh, located in Sonargaon Upazila, Narayanganj District, Bangladesh. The total population is 33,457.
