= Mahmudpur Union =

Mahmudpur Union মাহমুদপুর ইউনিয়ন, আড়াইহাজার
- Location within Bangladesh
- Coordinates: 23.7770°N 90.6910°E
- Country: Bangladesh
- Division: Dhaka Division
- District: Narayanganj district
- Upazila: Araihazar Upazila

Government
  - Type: Union Council
- Time zone: UTC+6 (BST)

Mahmudpur Union (Bengali: মাহমুদপুর ইউনিয়ন, আড়াইহাজার) is a union parishad of Araihazar Upazila in Narayanganj District of the Division of Dhaka, Bangladesh. It has a population of 13,766 men and 13,735 women. The union has a literacy rate of 29.9 per cent.
