= Araihazar Upazila =

Araihazar আড়াইহাজার
- Upazila
- Araihazar Upazila
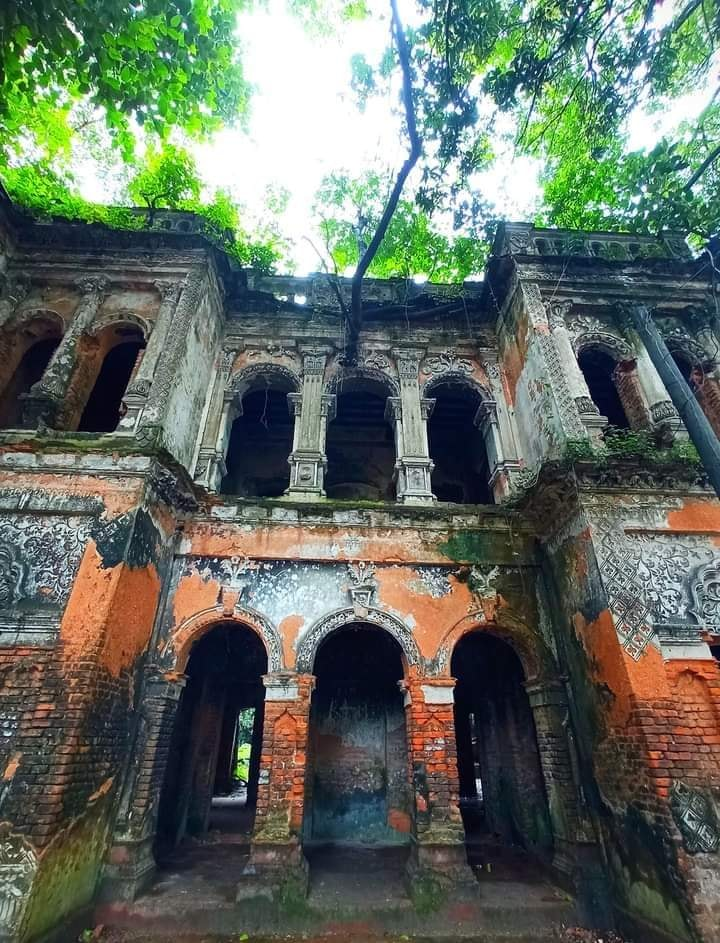
- Balipara Zamindar Bari

- Coordinates: 23°47.5′N 90°39′E
- Country: Bangladesh
- Division: Dhaka
- District: Narayanganj
- Thana: 1977
- Upazila: 1983

Government
  - Upazila Chairman: Junayed Habib
  - MP (Narayanganj-2): Nazrul Islam Babu

Area
  - Total: 181.07 km^{2} (69.91 sq mi)

Population (2022)
  - Total: 467,547
  - Density: 2,582.1/km^{2} (6,687.7/sq mi)
- Demonym: Araihazari
- Time zone: UTC+6 (BST)
- Postal code: 1450
- Area code: 06722
- Website: Official Map of Araihazar

Araihazar Upazila mauza geocode map

Araihazar (Bengali: আড়াইহাজার) is an upazila (sub-district) of the Narayanganj District in Bangladesh, part of the Dhaka Division.

== Etymology ==
Araihazar is named after the leftover 2,500 Mughal soldiers of Man Singh I that fought with Isa Khan in the 17th century. The word for "two thousand and five hundred" in Bangla is "Araihazar" (Bengali: আড়াইহাজার romanised: Araihajar), hence the name.

== History ==
In 1921, a thana (police outpost administrative headquarters) was established in Araihazar, under the former Dhaka district. Araihazar Thana's status was upgraded to upazila (sub-district) in 1983 as part of the President of Bangladesh Hussain Muhammad Ershad's decentralisation programme.

== Geography ==
Araihazar is located at 23.7917°N 90.6500°E. It has 111,040 households and total area 181.07 km^{2}.

== Demographics ==
Religions in Araihazar Upazila (2022)
Religion	Percent
Islam	96.77%
Hinduism	3.21%

According to the 2022 Bangladeshi census, Araihazar Upazila had 111,021 households and a population of 467,547. 10.27% of the population were under 5 years of age. Araihazar had a literacy rate (age 7 and over) of 69.34%: 70.73% for males and 67.95% for females, and a sex ratio of 99.85 males for every 100 females. 90,937 (19.45%) lived in urban areas.

According to the 2011 Census of Bangladesh, Araihazar Upazila had 77,462 households and a population of 376,550. 96,076 (25.51%) were under 10 years of age. Araihazar had a literacy rate (age 7 and over) of 41.0%, compared to the national average of 51.8%, and a sex ratio of 999 females per 1000 males. 14,423 (3.83%) lived in urban areas.

As of the 2001 Bangladesh census, Araihazar has a population of 331566. Males constitute 51.75% of the population, and females 48.25%. This Upazila's eighteen up population is 142883. Araihazar has an average literacy rate of 32% (7+ years), and the national average of 32.4% literate.

== Administration ==
Araihazar Upazila is divided into Araihazar Municipality, Gopaldi Municipality, and 11 union parishads: Bishnandi, Brahmandi, Duptara, Fatepur, Haizadi, Kalapaharia, Khagakanda, Mahmudpur, Sadasardi, Satgram, and Uchitpur.

== See also ==
- Upazilas of Bangladesh
- Districts of Bangladesh
- Divisions of Bangladesh
