= Narayanganj Sadar Upazila =

Sub-District of Narayanganj district

Narayanganj Sadar নারায়নগঞ্জ
- Upazila
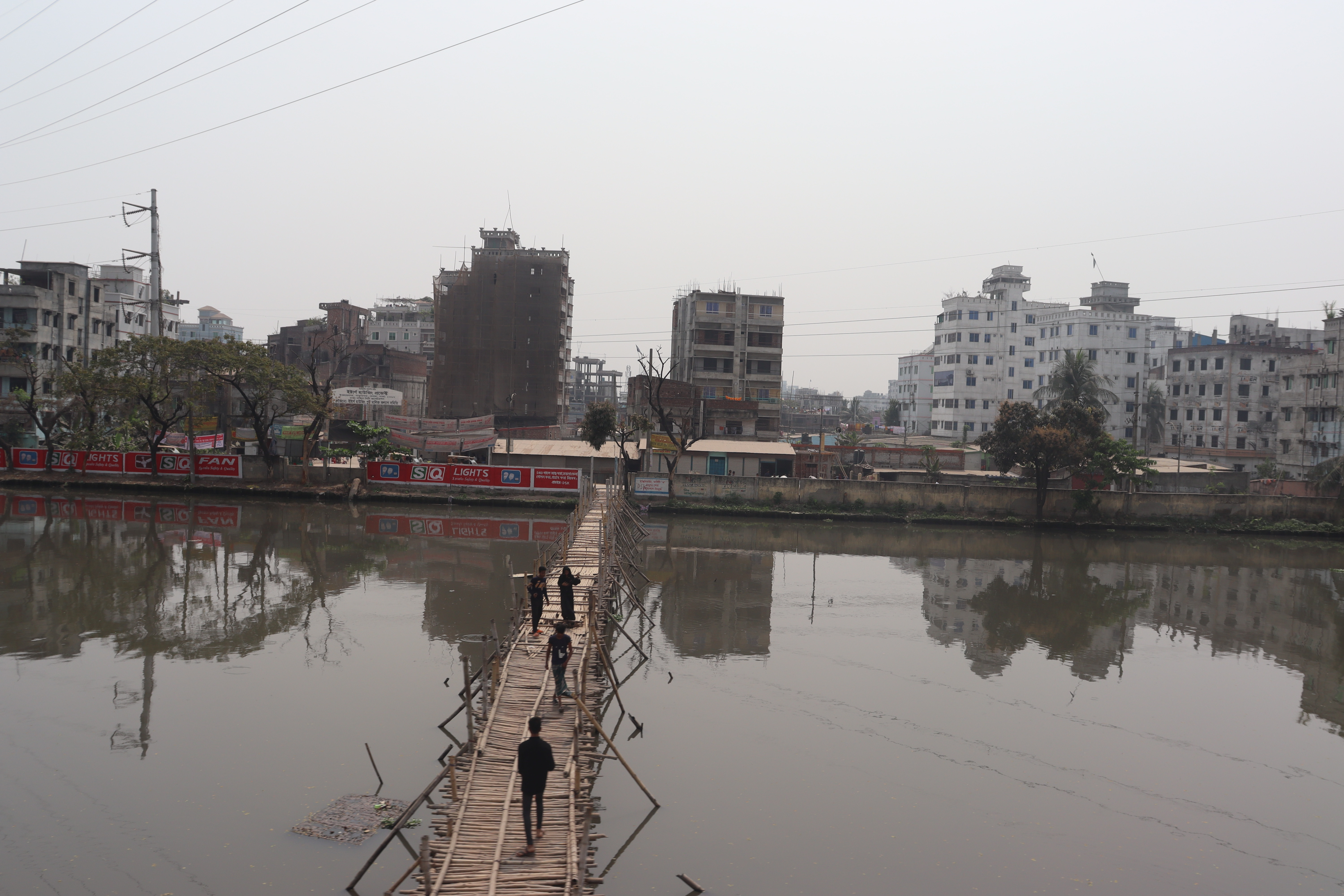
- Shitalakshya River at Narayanganj Sadar

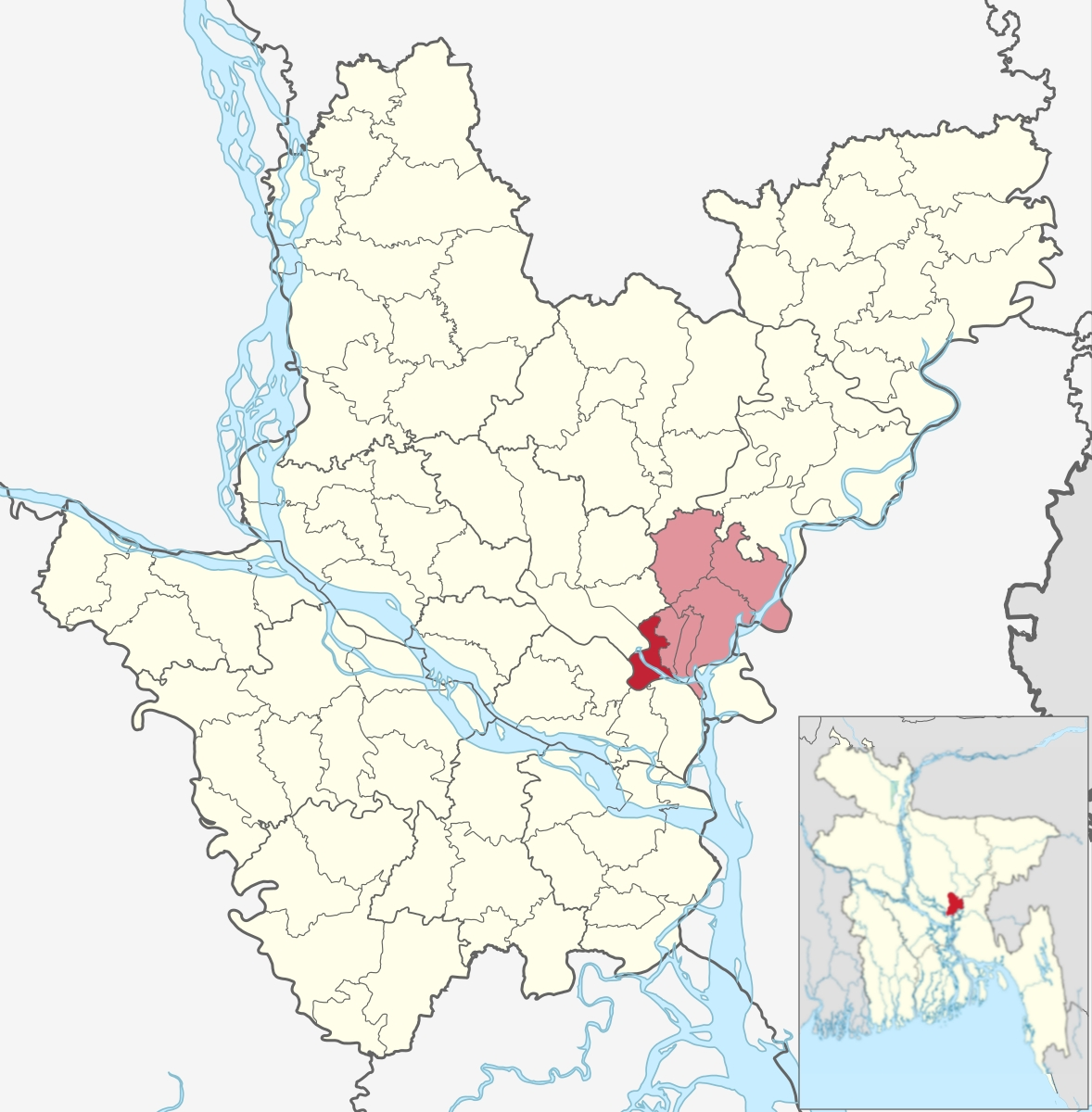
- Map of Narayanganj Sadar upazila
- Coordinates: 23°36′N 90°30′E
- Country: Bangladesh
- Division: Dhaka
- District: Narayanganj

Area
  - Total: 100.74 km^{2} (38.90 sq mi)

Population (2022)
  - Total: 1,770,734
  - Density: 17,577/km^{2} (45,525/sq mi)
- Time zone: UTC+6 (BST)
- Postal code: 1400
- Area code: 0671
- Website: Official Map of Narayanganj Sadar

Narayanganj Sadar Upazila mauza geocode map

Narayanganj Sadar (Bengali: নারায়নগঞ্জ) is an upazila of Narayanganj District in Dhaka Division, Bangladesh.

== Geography ==
Narayanganj Sadar is located at 23.6000°N 90.5000°E. It has 476,148 households and total area 100.74 km^{2}.

== Demographics ==
Religions in Narayanganj Sadar Upazila (2022)
Religion	Percent
Islam	96.30%
Hinduism	3.65%
Other or not stated	0.05%

According to the 2022 Bangladeshi census, Narayanganj Sadar Upazila had 274,502 households and a population of 1,012,144. 8.54% of the population were under 5 years of age. Narayanganj Sadar had a literacy rate (age 7 and over) of 80.59%: 82.21% for males and 78.82% for females, and a sex ratio of 109.23 males for every 100 females. 110,106 (10.88%) lived in urban areas.

As of the 1991 Bangladesh census, Narayanganj Sadar has a population of 604,561. Males constitute 55.89% of the population, and females 44.11%. This Upazila's eighteen-up population is 339,155. Narayanganj Sadar has an average literacy rate of 49.6% (7+ years), and the national average of 32.4% literate.

== Administration ==
Narayanganj Sadar Upazila is divided into 07 Union Parishads and a City Corporation.

Union Parishads

1. Alirtek
2. Baktaboli
3. Enayetnagar
4. Fatullah
5. Gognagar
6. Kashipur
7. Kutubpur

The union parishads are subdivided into 56 mauzas and 132 villages.

City Corporation

- Narayanganj City Corporation

Narayanganj City Corporation is subdivided into 27 wards.

Upazila Chairman: - Woman Vice Chairman: -

Vice Chairman: -

Upazila Nirbahi Officer (UNO): Md.Gausul Azam

== Education ==
There are twelve colleges in the upazila. They include honors level colleges Haji Misir Ali University College, Narayanganj College, and Narayanganj Government Mohila College. Government Tolaram College, founded in 1937, is the only masters level college.

According to Banglapedia, Adarsha Girls' School and College, Narayanganj govt. Technical School and college, Deobhog Hazi Uzir Ali High School (founded in 1924), Morgan Girls High School (1910), Adarsha School Narayanganj (1906), Narayanganj Government Girls' High School, Narayanganj Ideal School (2000) and Narayanganj High School and College (1885) are notable secondary schools.

The madrasa education system includes three fazil madrasas and one kamil madrasa.

== See also ==
- Upazilas of Bangladesh
- Districts of Bangladesh
- Divisions of Bangladesh
- Administrative geography of Bangladesh
