= Sonargaon Upazila =

Sonargaon সোনারগাঁও
- Upazila
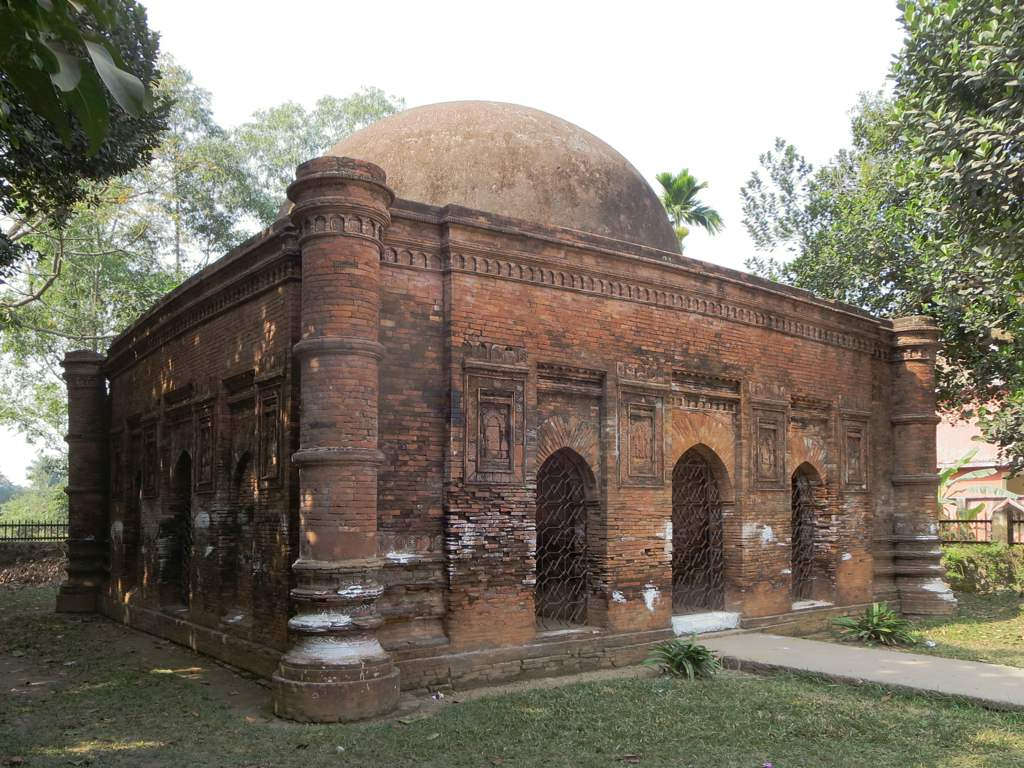
- Goaldi Mosque in Sonargaon

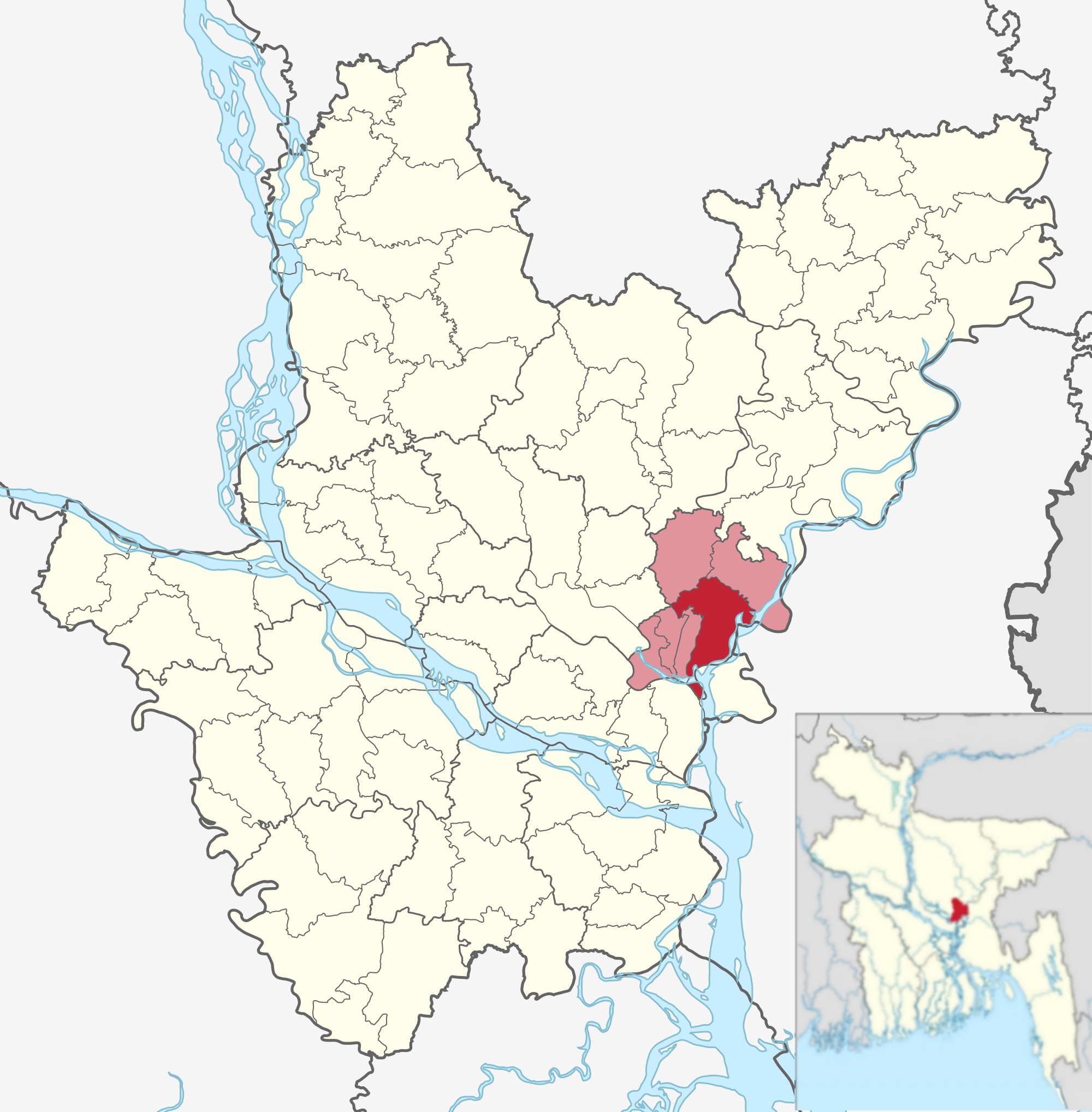
- Coordinates: 23°39.5′N 90°36.5′E
- Country: Bangladesh
- Division: Dhaka
- District: Narayanganj

Area
  - Total: 171.67 km^{2} (66.28 sq mi)

Population (2022)
  - Total: 551,841
  - Density: 3,214.5/km^{2} (8,325.6/sq mi)
- Time zone: UTC+6 (BST)
- Postal code: 1440
- Area code: 06723
- Website: sonargaon.narayanganj.gov.bd

Sonargaon (Bengali: সোনারগাঁও) is an upazila of Narayanganj District in the Division of Dhaka, Bangladesh.

Sonargaon Upazila mauza geocode map

== Demographics ==
Religions in Sonargaon Upazila (2022)
Religion	Percent
Islam	96.36%
Hinduism	3.54%
Other or not stated	0.10%

According to the 2022 Bangladeshi census, Sonargaon Upazila had 142,631 households and a population of 551,841. 9.24% of the population were under 5 years of age. Sonargaon had a literacy rate (age 7 and over) of 78.04%: 79.78% for males and 76.20% for females, and a sex ratio of 105.72 males for every 100 females. 106,386 (19.28%) lived in urban areas.

According to 2011 Census of Bangladesh, Sonargaon Upazila had 89,565 households and a population of 400,358. 88,186 (22.03%) were under 10 years of age. Sonargaon had a literacy rate (age 7 and over) of 54.6%, compared to the national average of 51.8%, and a sex ratio of 958 females per 1000 males. 32,796 (8.19%) lived in urban areas.

As of the 1991 Bangladeshi census, Sonargaon has a population of 261,881 in 44,405 households. Males constitute 52.11% of the population, and females 47.89%. The population over 18 years of age is 118,319.

Sonargaon has an average literacy rate of 33.1% (7+ years), compared with the national average of 32.4%.

== Food ==
Local food includes Gurer Zilapi, Murali, Binni Khoi, Shwandesh, etc.

== Administration ==
Sonargaon Upazila is divided into Sonargaon Municipality and ten union parishads: Baidyerbazar, Baradi, Jampur, Kachpur, Mugrapara, Naogaon, Pirijpur, Sadipur, Shambhupura, and Shanmandi. The union parishads are subdivided into 351 mauzas and 487 villages.

Sonargaon Municipality is subdivided into 9 wards and 60 mahallas.

== See also ==
- Sonargaon
- Upazilas of Bangladesh
- Districts of Bangladesh
- Divisions of Bangladesh
