= Murder of Tanvir Muhammad Taqi =

2013 murder in Bangladesh

Murder of Tanvir Muhammad Taqi তানভীর মুহাম্মদ ত্বকী হত্যাকাণ্ড
- Tanvir Muhammad Taqi

- Murder of Tanvir Muhammad Taqi (Bangladesh)
- Date: March 6, 2013
- Time: Abducted around 4:00 PM; tortured and murdered between 10:30 PM and 11:00 PM (BST (UTC+6))
- Location: Body recovered from Kumudini canal of the Shitalakshya River in Narayanganj, Bangladesh
- Also known as: Taqi Murder Case
- Type: Murder, abduction, torture
- Motive: Political vengeance against Taqi's father, Rafiur Rabbi, for his civic activism
- Target: Tanvir Muhammad Taqi
- Outcome: Formation of the Santrash Nirmul Taqi Mancha; stalled judicial process for over 13 years; renewed investigation in 2024
- Casualties: 1
- Deaths: 1 (Tanvir Muhammad Taqi)
- Burial: River port area, Narayanganj
- Inquiries: Rapid Action Battalion (RAB-11)
- Arrests: 11
- Convicted: None (Trial pending)
- Charges: Murder, abduction, torture, and concealing a body
- Trial: Pending (Awaiting formal charge sheet)

The Murder of Tanvir Muhammad Taqi (Bengali: তানভীর মুহাম্মদ ত্বকী হত্যাকাণ্ড) was the abduction and killing of a 17-year-old student in Narayanganj, Bangladesh in 2013. He died after being tortured and strangled inside a clandestine torture cell operated by local political figures. His dead body was found floating in the Kumudini canal off the Shitalakshya River two days after his disappearance.

== Background ==
=== Victim ===
Tanvir Muhammad Taqi was a 17-year-old student residing in the Puratan Court Road area of Narayanganj, Bangladesh. He was enrolled at ABC International School in the city's Chashara area, where he had recently completed his A-Level examinations. On 7 March 2013, one day after his disappearance, his A-Level results were published, revealing that he had scored 294 in chemistry and 297 in physics out of 300

=== Political context ===
Taqi's father, Rafiur Rabbi, is a prominent cultural activist, vice-president of the Narayanganj Nagarik Committee, and the convener of the Narayanganj Gonojagoron Mancha, an organization that demanded capital punishment for perpetrators of crimes against humanity during the 1971 Bangladesh Liberation War. Over several years, Rabbi led several local civic movements that directly challenged the political dominance and economic interests of the influential Osman family in Narayanganj.

In 2011 Narayanganj City Corporation mayoral election, Selina Hayat Ivy defeated the Awami League-backed candidate, Shamim Osman, winning by a margin of over 100,000 votes, in which Rabbi served as the member secretary of the election steering committee for Ivy and heavily mobilized public support.

Also in 2011, Rabbi established a passenger rights forum to organize mass protests against unauthorized bus fare increases on the Narayanganj route. The movement directly opposed Shamim Osman, who supported the fare hikes, and publicly alleged that millions of takas in extortion fees were being funneled to Shamim and Nasim Osman; the sustained public pressure ultimately forced transport operators to lower the fares.

In 2012, Rabbi led another major citizen mobilization against the illegal grabbing of railway land in Narayanganj, where local figures operating under Nasim Osman's patronage were constructing an unauthorized market. The protest forced local authorities to reclaim the land, halting the multimillion-taka project. Investigators and local commentators concluded that Taqi was targeted as an act of political retribution against his father, intended both to inflict emotional suffering on Rabbi and to instill a climate of terror among those opposing the Osman family's control in Narayanganj.

== Disappearance and murder ==
On 6 March 2013, at approximately 4:00 PM, 17-year-old Tanvir Muhammad Taqi left his residence on Shaista Khan Road in Narayanganj to visit Sudhijon Pathagar, a local library. When Taqi failed to return home by evening, his father, Rafiur Rabbi, initiated a search across the city and subsequently filed a First information report (FIR) alongside written complaints with both the Narayanganj Kotwali Police Station and the Rapid Action Battalion (RAB).

On 8 March 2013, at approximately 10:15 AM, local residents discovered a body floating in the Kumudini canal, an offshoot of the Shitalakshya River located in the Charargop area. Police recovered the body shortly after, finding Taqi's powered-off mobile phone in his pocket, and Rabbi officially identified the remains before they were transferred to the Narayanganj General Hospital morgue for an autopsy. That same day, Rabbi filed a formal murder case against unnamed individuals at the Narayanganj Sadar Model Police Station.

Forensic examinations and autopsy findings established that Taqi had been subjected to severe torture and mutilation prior to his death. Medical examiners reported heavy blunt force trauma to three sides of his head, crushing injuries to his testicles, a severely damaged eye, and visible bruises across his throat, face, and right eye, determining that the perpetrators ultimately strangulated him to hasten death.

On 8 March 2013, Taqi's funeral was conducted at the Kalibazar mosque around 4:00 PM. Prior to his burial at the family graveyard in the Port area, his body was brought to the Chashara Shaheed Minar, where citizens, civil society leaders, cultural activists, political figures, and Narayanganj City Corporation Mayor Selina Hayat Ivy gathered to pay their tribute.

== Investigation ==
On 8 March 2013, the day Taqi's body was recovered, his father, Rafiur Rabbi, filed a formal murder case against unidentified individuals at the Narayanganj Sadar Model Police Station. On 18 March 2013, Rabbi submitted a supplementary complaint to the Superintendent of Police, explicitly accusing seven individuals including Awami League lawmaker Shamim Osman and his son Ayon Osman alongside eight to ten unnamed accomplices. Dissatisfied with the initial police probe, Rabbi appealed to the High Court, leading the Home Ministry to officially transfer the investigation to the Rapid Action Battalion (RAB) on 20 June 2013.

On 7 August 2013, a specialized RAB-11 team led by Lt. Col. Jahangir Alam conducted a two-hour raid on "Winner Fashion," an office located on Allama Iqbal Road in Narayanganj belonging to Azmeri Osman, son of the Jatiya Party Member of the parliament Nasim Osman and nephew of Shamim Osman. The location had previously been identified by local civic groups as a torture cell operated by the Osman family. During the search, law enforcement seized forensic evidence, including a pair of blood-stained jeans, a broken hockey stick, nylon ropes, and a pistol butt, while documenting numerous bullet marks on the facility's walls, sofa, and almirah; four employees at the office were detained for questioning. On 20 December 2013, the torture cell was demolished following the expiration of its lease agreement.

Following initial investigative leads, law enforcement arrested five suspects: Yusuf Hossain Liton, Sultan Shawkat (alias Bhromor), Rifat Bin Osman, Tayebuddin Jacky, and Saleh Rahman Shimanto. On 12 November 2013, Sultan Shawkat, a close associate of Azmeri Osman, recorded a judicial confession under Section 164 of the Code of Criminal Procedure before Senior Judicial Magistrate M. M. Mohiuddin. In his statement, Shawkat confessed how the victim was abducted and killed. According to him, on the evening of March 6, 2023, was abducted from Bangabandhu Road in Narayanganj while on his way to a local library. At the instruction of Azmeri Osman, his accomplices followed Taqi and forcefully transported him to Osman's commercial establishment, Winner Fashion, which functioned as a clandestine torture cell on Allama Iqbal Road. Inside the cell, the abductors subjected Taqi to severe physical assault, beating him unconscious with wooden truncheons in the presence of Azmeri Osman. An accomplice, Kalam Shikder, then knelt on Taqi's chest and strangled him to death. Before midnight, the perpetrators stuffed his body into a sack, transported it to the Charargop area in Azmeri Osman's Toyota vehicle Jamshed Hossain, and subsequently ferried it by boat to the Kumudini Jora canal, where they dumped the corpse into the Shitalakshya River in the early hours of March 7. However, sixteen days after recording the confession, Shawkat petitioned to retract his statement, and following his release on bail on 20 March 2014, he fled the country, prompting the court to issue an arrest warrant against him in absentia.

On 5 March 2014, one day before the first anniversary of Taqi's disappearance, RAB's Additional Director General Col. Ziaul Ahsan convened a press briefing to state that the agency had cracked the case and secured concrete evidence implicating eleven individuals led by Azmeri Osman. Concurrently, a draft copy of the RAB investigation report leaked to the media, detailing the logistics of the killing and confirming that political vengeance against Rabbi served as the primary motive. During the briefing, Col. Ahsan publicly assured that the formal charge sheet against the accused would be submitted to the court imminently.

=== Judicial delays and political interference (2014–2024) ===
Despite the Rapid Action Battalion (RAB) announcing the completion of its initial probe and leaking a draft charge sheet implicating eleven individuals in early 2014, the formal charge sheet was not submitted to court for over a decade. The judicial process experienced severe stagnation, with court deadlines extended repeatedly; investigators failed to submit formal findings across over 80 scheduled hearing dates over the years.

The victim's family, human rights activists, and civil society leaders consistently alleged that the investigation was deliberately stalled due to high-level interference from the Awami League-led government to protect the Osman family. On 30 April 2024, Jatiya Party lawmaker Nasim Osman, the father of prime suspect Azmeri Osman, died. Shortly thereafter, Prime Minister Sheikh Hasina offered condolences in Parliament and publicly defended the Osman family. Rabbi explicitly asserted that all progress in the murder investigation ceased following this parliamentary endorsement, accusing Hasina of shielding the suspects.

Narayanganj City Corporation Mayor Selina Hayat Ivy repeatedly demanded a speedy trial regardless of political affiliations, condemning what she characterized as an "Osmani reign" where local authorities operated under the influence of powerful political patrons.

The prolonged delay sparked a continuous civil society campaign. Activists established the Santrash Nirmul Taqi Mancha (Platform to Eliminate Terrorism) and organized monthly protests and candlelight vigils on the 8th of every month. Prominent national figures, including Professor Serajul Islam Choudhury, Professor Anisuzzaman, and human rights advocate Sultana Kamal, issued joint statements condemning state inaction, arguing that the failure to prosecute identified suspects fostered a culture of criminal impunity.

On 12 February 2022, an armed group of over 100 men on motorcycles attacked the Narayanganj office of the local newspaper Dainik Somoyer Narayanganj. The assailants forcefully entered the premises, vandalized property, destroyed security equipment, confiscated digital storage devices, and issued death threats to the editor and staff, threatening to burn down the facility unless a public apology was issued. The attack occurred in direct response to the newspaper publishing a detailed front-page report the previous day outlining the leaked 2014 RAB draft charge sheet that named Azmeri Osman in connection with the murder. 11 people were arrested in connection to the attack

=== Renewed investigation (2024–present) ===
The trajectory of the investigation shifted following the July Uprising and fall of the Awami League government in August 2024. Lt. Col. Tanvir Mahmud Pasha, commanding officer of RAB, subsequently acknowledged to the media that the probe into Taqi's murder had been stalled for years due to political pressure.

The Rapid Action Battalion (RAB) initiated a series of law enforcement operations in September 2024, apprehending six suspects connected to prime accused Azmeri Osman. In September 2024, law enforcers arrested Shafayet Hossain Shipon, Mamun Mia, and Kajal Hawlader during operations in Dhaka and Narayanganj. On 11 September 2024, RAB arrested Jamshed Sheikh, Azmeri Osman's personal driver who allegedly drove the vehicle used to move Taqi's body in Mirpur, Dhaka. Later that month, RAB detained Yaar Mohammad (alias Parvez) and Abdullah Al Mamun (alias Jamai Mamun), with Mamun, a relative of Azmeri Osman, apprehended on 30 September while attempting to board a bus bound for Khagrachhari on the Dhaka-Chattogram highway.

On 15 September 2024, suspect Kajal Hawlader delivered a judicial confession under Section 164 of the Code of Criminal Procedure before Senior Judicial Magistrate Haider Ali. In his deposition, Kajal stated that he was present at Azmeri Osman's "Winner Fashion" office when the abducted teenager was brought to the location in a Toyota X-Fielder car around 10:30 PM on 6 March 2013. He detailed that Taqi was tortured for over 30 minutes in the presence of Azmeri Osman before his body was placed in the boot of the car to be dumped in the Shitalakshya River.

On 18 September 2024, RAB investigators revisited key locations alongside suspect Shipon, inspecting the former site of the "Winner Fashion" office on College Road, which had been demolished to construct a multi-storey building and the Kumudini canal where the body was originally recovered.

On 1 November 2025, RAB-11 Commanding Officer Lt. Col. H. M. Sajjad Hossain convened a press briefing at the RAB Media Centre in Karwan Bazar, announcing that the investigation into the murder was complete. He confirmed that the interrogations of the newly arrested suspects provided key evidence and stated that the final charge sheet would be submitted to the court.

== Reaction ==
Following the discovery of Taqi's mutilated body on 8 March 2013, Narayanganj experienced widespread public demonstrations. Citizens, representatives from various political, social, and cultural organizations, and Narayanganj City Corporation Mayor Selina Hayat Ivy gathered at the Chashara Shaheed Minar to pay their final respects at his funeral. Local cultural organizations, including the Sammilito Sangskritik Jote, called for a dawn-to-dusk hartal (general strike) on 9 March 2013, which received backing from political parties including the Communist Party of Bangladesh (CPB) and Workers Party of Bangladesh. Local citizens, educators, and rights activists established the Santrash Nirmul Taqi Mancha (Taqi Platform for Elimination of Terrorism) under the convenorship of Taqi's father, Rafiur Rabbi. The platform initiated a long-standing civic movement, organizing monthly rallies, protests, and candlelight vigils on the 8th of every month. Narayanganj-4 Member of Parliament Sarah Begum Kabori publicly blamed the influential Osman family for the murder.

In March 2014, following the leak of RAB's draft charge sheet implicating Azmeri Osman, and the subsequent parliamentary endorsement of the Osman family by Prime Minister Sheikh Hasina in April 2014, progress on the judicial process effectively ceased.

In March 2016, twenty-two prominent national figures, including Professor Emeritus Anisuzzaman, Professor Emeritus Serajul Islam Choudhury, cultural personality Kamal Lohani, and human rights advocate Sultana Kamal issued a joint statement demanding the immediate submission of the formal charge sheet. They criticized the state's inaction, explicitly contrasting the delayed Taqi investigation with the swift trials conducted in other contemporary child murder cases, such as those of Rajon and Rakib. In 2018, at the fifth anniversary of the murder, the Santrash Nirmul Taqi Mancha and Mayor Ivy again publicly condemn the deliberate delays and called for direct state intervention to advance the trial.

In February 2020, twenty-six eminent citizens issued another joint statement seeking executive intervention to expedite the trial. By March 2021, Rafiur Rabbi publicly noted that while law enforcement had identified the perpetrators within a year of the crime, high-level political pressure had deliberately blocked the submission of the final probe report.

During the tenth anniversary of the murder in March 2023, Mayor Selina Hayat Ivy addressed a memorial gathering, asserting that the identities of the killers were an open secret nationwide. She alleged that the perpetrators operated under direct state patronage, sustaining an "Osmani reign" of terror where local administrative and law enforcement officials were subjugated by political figures.

In May 2023, public outrage resurfaced following media disclosures that prime suspect Azmeri Osman had formally applied to the Narayanganj Deputy Commissioner's office for licenses to acquire two personal firearms (a shotgun and a pistol). The application was forwarded to the Special Branch of the district police for verification. Representatives of the Santrash Nirmul Taqi Mancha and legal experts from the Narayanganj District Bar Association strongly condemned the request, arguing that approving firearm licenses for an individual implicated in a high-profile murder and accused of running torture cells posed a severe threat to public safety.

Following the fall of the Awami League government through July Uprising, a rally was organized by the Santrash Nirmul Taqi Mancha, Rafiur Rabbi publicly accused former Prime Minister Sheikh Hasina of personally obstructing the trial for over a decade to protect the Osman family. In late February 2026, a coalition of twenty-four prominent citizens including Badiul Alam Majumdar, legal expert Shahdeen Malik, and Ekushey Padak recipient photojournalist Shahidul Alam issued a joint statement expressing concern that the formal charge sheet had still not been submitted to the court despite 101 scheduled hearing dates spanning thirteen years. On 6 March 2026, marking exactly thirteen years since Taqi's abduction, mourners, political leaders, and cultural activists gathered at his grave in Bandar Upazila to demand the finalization of the legal process. On 22 May 2026, a large demonstration titled Taqi Samabesh was held at Manik Mia Avenue in Dhaka, featuring cultural performances and public addresses denouncing the prolonged delay and demanding the immediate commencement of a formal trial.
