= Ghiyath =

Ghiyath or Ghiyāth is a given name. Notable people with the name include:

- Ghiyath al-Kashi (1380–1429), Persian astronomer and mathematician
- Ghiyath al-Din Abu'l-Fath Omar ibn Ibrahim Al-Nisaburi Khayyami (1048–1131), Persian polymath: philosopher, mathematician, astronomer and poet
- Ghiyath ad-Din Mas'ud (1108–1152), the Seljuq Sultan of Iraq and western Persia
- Ghiyāth al-dīn Naqqāsh (fl. 1419–22), envoy of the Timurid ruler of Persia and Transoxania to China
- Ghiyath ad-Din Mehmed I Tapar (died 1118), son of Seljuq Sultan Malik Shah I
- Ghiyath al-Din Tughluq (died 1325), the founder and first ruler of the Muslim Tughluq dynasty

== See also ==
- Ghiyath al-Din (disambiguation)
- Ghiyas (disambiguation) (a different transcription of essentially the same name)
- Gaeth
- Goath
