= M Osman Ali =

Bangladeshi politician (1900–1971)

Mohammad Osman Ali
- মোহম্মদ ওসমান আলী

Member of East Bengal Legislative Assembly
- In office 1947–1954

Member of Bengal Legislative Assembly
- In office 1946–1947
- Preceded by: Khwaja Shahabuddin
- Succeeded by: Assembly disbanded
- Constituency: Narayanganj South

Personal details
- Born: 1 January 1900 Jamalkandi, Tipperah district, Bengal Presidency
- Died: 19 March 1971 (aged 71) East Pakistan
- Party: Awami League
- Children: AKM Samsuzzoha
- Relatives: Osman family
- Education: Calcutta Islamia College

Mohammad Osman Ali (Bengali: মোহম্মদ ওসমান আলী; 1 January 1900 – 19 March 1971) was a founding member of the Awami Muslim League and a member of the East Bengal Legislative Assembly.

== Early life and education ==
Ali was born on 1 January 1900 to a Bengali Muslim family of Pradhans in the village of Jamalkandi in Tipperah district, Bengal Presidency (now Comilla District, Bangladesh). His father was Haji Dengu Pradhan. Ali had his primary education at his village school and passed matriculation examination in 1920. Then he took admission in Calcutta Islamia College.

== Career ==
Ali was involved in the Khilafat Movement in 1920 and later in the Non-Cooperation Movement. While the Non-cooperation Movement was going on he started a jute trade in Narayanganj, East Bengal. He helped organise the Pakistan movement in Narayanganj. In 1930s, he published Sabuz Bangla (Green Bengal), a literary magazine.

With the beginning of the Pakistan Movement based on the Lahore Resolution of 1940, Ali organised the movement in Narayanganj. In 1946, he was elected a member of the Bengal Legislative Assembly. He defeated Khwaja Habibullah, the last Nawab of Dhaka. He was awarded the title Khan Sahib by the British Government, which he disavowed in 1944 for the policies of the British Raj.

Ali served as the president of Narayanganj City Muslim League from 1942 to 1947 and the vice president of Dhaka District Muslim League. On 23 June 1949, he helped found the Awami Muslim League. He was involved in all the major movement of East Pakistan, the Language Movement of 1952, Six point movement and the 1969 uprising in East Pakistan.

== Family and legacy ==
Ali was married to Jamila Osman and later Awami Muslim League president Amirunnesa Begum. He died on 19 March 1971. His eldest son, AKM Samsuzzoha (d. 1987), joined politics and was elected to the East Pakistan Provincial Assembly. He was elected a member of parliament of Bangladesh in 1973. He was awarded posthumously Independence Day Award in 2011. Shamsuzzoha's eldest son, Nasim Osman (d. 2014) joined Bangladesh Jatiya Party and became an MP in the elections of 1986, 1988, 2008 and 2014. The second son, Salim Osman got elected as an MP from the same constituency in 2014. The third son, Shamim Osman joined Bangladesh Awami League and became an MP from another constituency in Narayanganj during 1996-2001 and 2014–2024.
