= Mohammad Ali (Narayanganj politician) =

Bangladeshi politician

Member of Bangladesh Parliament
- In office 15 February 1996 – 12 June 1996
- Preceded by: Sirajul Islam
- Succeeded by: Shamim Osman

Personal details
- Party: Bangladesh Nationalist Party

Mohammad Ali is a Bangladesh Nationalist Party politician and a former member of parliament for Narayanganj-4.

== Career ==
Ali was elected to parliament from Narayanganj-4 as a Bangladesh Nationalist Party candidate on 15 February 1996.
