= Abul Kalam (politician) =

Bangladeshi politician

Member of Bangladesh Parliament
- In office 1991–1996
- Preceded by: Nasim Osman
- Succeeded by: S. M. Akram
- In office 2001–2008
- Preceded by: S. M. Akram
- Succeeded by: Nasim Osman

Personal details
- Party: Bangladesh Nationalist Party

Abul Kalam is a Bangladesh Nationalist Party politician and a former member of parliament for Narayanganj-5.

== Career ==
Abul Kalam was elected to parliament from Narayanganj-5 as a Bangladesh Nationalist Party candidate in 2001.
