= S. M. Akram =

Bangladeshi politician (1939– 2024)

Member of Bangladesh Parliament
- In office 12 June 1996 – 15 July 2001
- Preceded by: Abul Kalam
- Succeeded by: Abul Kalam
- Constituency: Narayanganj-5

Personal details
- Born: 16 October 1939 Bandar, Narayanganj District, Bengal Province, British India
- Died: 16 December 2024 (aged 85) Dhaka, Bangladesh
- Party: Awami League

S. M. Akram (Bengali: এস এম আকরাম; 16 October 1939 – 16 December 2024) was a Bangladeshi politician and government bureaucrat. He was a member of parliament for Narayanganj-5.

== Life and career ==
Akram was born to Peer Mohammad Master in Alinagar village in what is now Bandar Upazila of Narayanganj District. He father was a renowned and successful jute trader in Narayanganj. Akram held an M.A. in Political Science and LL.B. from the University of Dhaka.

Mr. S. M. Akram had a distinguished and long career as a civil servant. He served in the National Board of Revenue, the Privatization Board, the Board of Investment, the External Relations Division, and various other departments of the Government of Bangladesh as a civil servant, mostly in functions related to finance, economics, and planning. In his capacity as a civilian servant, he worked with several Finance Ministers and represented Bangladesh at various international forums. He was an Additional Secretary at the time of his retirement. After his retirement from civil service, he briefly served as the Managing Director of Scala Industries Ltd., a manufacturer of toothpaste tubes, for a few years.

He was a founder member of the Uttara Club, Dhaka, and served as its President for two successively terms 1993-94 and 1994-95.

Akram was elected to parliament from Narayanganj-5 as a Bangladesh Awami League candidate in 1996. He headed the Public Account Committee (PAC) in the parliament. A World Bank report described the Public Account Committee's role during Akram's tenure as its chariman as follows:

The PAC of the seventh parliament, headed by S. M. Akram (hereafter referred to as Akram Committee), appears to be more active than most of its predecessors. It has devised some different, albeit important, ways of working. For example, unlike its predecessors, which mostly examined the CAG reports that were more than a decade old, the Akram Committee is examining both current and old audit reports.

In 2011, Akram sought the Awami League nomination in the first election for Mayor of Narayanganj. The party instead chose Shamim Osman as their candidate. Akram withdrew from the race and threw his support behind another Awami Leaguer, Selina Hayat Ivy, who went on to win. Immediately after the mayoral election in Narayanganj, Akram resigned from the Awami League, saying he felt ill used by the national party in the mayoral election and in other instances. Mr. Akram had a troubled relationship with the Awami League leadership. He left the Awami League in November 2011 following serious disagreements with then Prime Minister Sheikh Hasina over policy matters and her support for Shamin Osman. After leaving the Awami League, he was Chief Patron of Nagorik Oikyo, a small political party that was active in opposing Sheikh Hasina's rule and stage-managed elections.

Akram died in Dhaka on 16 December 2024, at the age of 85. He was preceded in death by his wife, Dr. Fateha Akram, a gynecologist who worked at Holy Family Hospital in Dhaka.
