= Khela Hobe =

Bengali political slogan

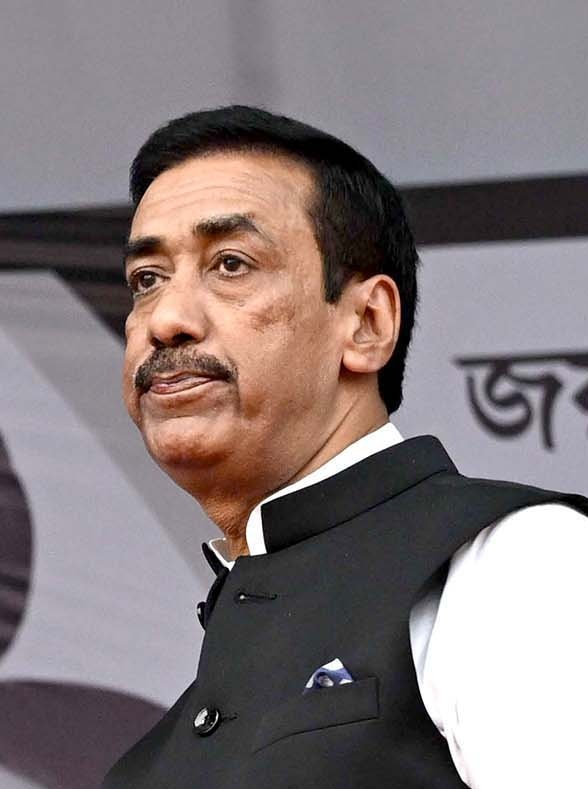
Shamim Osman, Bangladeshi politician, first used the slogan.

Khela Hobe (Bengali: খেলা হবে, Sanskrit: खेला होबे) is a popular Bengali language political slogan in Bangladesh and India, especially in West Bengal and Assam. It translates to English as "The game is on". The slogan was first popularized by Bangladeshi politician Shamim Osman.

== Usage ==
=== Politics ===
==== Bangladesh ====
Shamim Osman, an Awami League and Jatiya Sangsad member, first used the slogan "Khela Hobe" in 2013. He gave the slogan on the eve of the 10th National Assembly elections in the context of the movement led by Bangladesh Nationalist Party and Bangladesh Jamaat-e-Islami. He said at a political meeting in Narayanganj,

"কারে খেলা শেখান? আমরা তো ছোটবেলার খেলোয়াড়। খেলা হবে!" (lit. 'Who are you teaching the game? We are players from childhood. The game is on!')

He also used the slogan on 27 August 2022. On 16 July 2022, Obaidul Quader, General Secretary of Awami League and Jatiya Sangsad member also used the slogan to call the Bangladesh Nationalist Party on the way to the election. Then in 17 August, in a rally organized on the occasion of 2005 Bangladesh bombings day, At the triennial conference of the Awami League held in Dhaka in 29 October, and Tangail in 7 November, he used the slogan against the party. Obaidul Quader was later criticized by some members of the opposition in Parliament for using the slogan "Khela Hobe". In response to the criticism, he said that "Khela Hobe" was a political slogan and its use did not violate democracy.

==== India ====
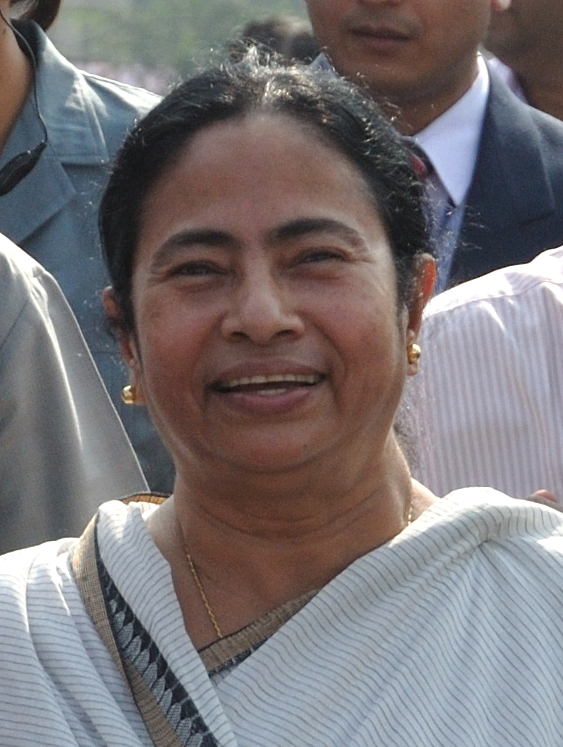
Mamata Banerjee, former Chief Minister of West Bengal, used the slogan.

In 2021 West Bengal Legislative Assembly election, the All India Trinamool Congress (AITC or TMC) utilised the sense of fighting spirit through its unofficial election anthem Khela Hobe (The Game is On) which was later modified into the slogan Bhanga Paye Khela Hobe (The Game will be played even with a fractured leg). The song was viral in the state of West Bengal to the extent that even BJP cadres used the slogan Khela Hobe instead of the official party slogans Aar Noy Onnyay (No More Injustice) and Sonar Bangla (Golden Bengal) until Narendra Modi himself disapproved of it. 'Khela Hobe' (the game is on), used by Trinamool Congress in their election campaigns, proved to be highly successful. Debangshu Bhattacharya, Trinamool spokesperson and General Secretary of Trinamool Youth Congress, had composed a song titled 'Khela Hobe' which was uploaded on social media on January 7 and later its DJ version from the independent music artists like DJ ABHI-Maheshtala (Indian DJ and music producer) went viral on the internet.

After the victory in the 2021 election, TMC party workers celebrated using the slogan 'Party hobe' and danced to the song Khela Hobe.

In view of the popular slogan of Khela Hobe, Mamata Banerjee declared that her party would observe 16 August (on that day in 1980, supporters of East Bengal FC and Mohun Bagan AC, 2 rival football clubs clashed with each other, leading to death of 12 supporters, thereby signifying Bengali people's passion for football) as Khela Hobe Divas, which the BJP tried to link with Direct Action Day. 'Khela Hobe Divas' was celebrated as planned.

Mamata Banerjee also launched a government scheme named Khela Hobe under which a grant of 5,00,000 INR alongside free footballs were distributed to 25,000 sporting clubs of the state for promotion of sports among the economically poorer sections of the society.

Inspired by the slogan, the political parties Samajwadi Party and Suheldev Bharatiya Samaj Party in Uttar Pradesh used the slogan 'Khadeda Hobe'.

== Successor slogans ==
Following the success of "Khela Hobe" in the 2021 elections, the AITC continued to develop musical campaign slogans. "Mamata Di Arekbar" (Bengali: মমতা দি আরেকবার, lit. 'Mamata Di One More Time') emerged as a subsequent slogan emphasizing administrative continuity and leadership endorsement.

Like "Khela Hobe," Debangshu Bhattacharya composed and performed "Mamata Di Arekbar," with digital production by Kolkata-based DJ ABHI-Maheshtala (Abhilash Ghosh). The track was released on August 21, 2025, through Mermaidz Records and distributed on streaming platforms including YouTube, Apple Music, and Spotify.

For the 2026 Assembly elections, the party released a new campaign song with the slogan "Je Lorche Sobar Daake, Sei Jetabe Bangla Maake" (The one who fights for everyone's call, will win over Bengal).

=== Other ===
Kolkata hosted its first football tournament named Khela Hobe for the blind in November 2021.

Durga Puja pandals were created on the Khela Hobe theme.
