= AKM Samsuzzoha =

Bangladeshi politician

- আবুল খায়ের মোহাম্মদ শামসুজ্জোহা

Member of Parliament
- In office 7 March 1973 – 15 August 1975
- Succeeded by: ASM Solomon
- Constituency: Dhaka-30

Personal details
- Born: c. 1924 Narayanganj District, Bengal Presidency, British India
- Died: 20 February 1987 (aged 62–63)
- Party: Bangladesh Awami League
- Relations: Osman family
- Children: Nasim Osman; Salim Osman; Shamim Osman
- Education: University of Dhaka

Abul Khayer Mohammad Samsuzzoha (Bengali: আবুল খায়ের মোহাম্মদ শামসুজ্জোহা; 1924 – 20 February 1987) was a Bangladesh Awami League politician. He was a Member of Parliament from Narayanganj constituency. He received the Independence Day Award in 2011 posthumously from the Government of Bangladesh.

== Early life and education ==
Samsuzzoha was born in 1924 to politician Mohammad Osman Ali and Jamila Osman in Narayanganj, East Pakistan. He belongs to a Bengali Muslim family of Pradhans from Jamalkandi in present-day Comilla. His father was a founding member of the Awami League.

He graduated from the University of Dhaka.

== Career ==
Samsuzzoha was a founding member of Awami Muslim League. He was involved in the Bengali Language Movement of 1952 that demanded Bengali be made a state language of Pakistan. He was elected a member of parliament at the Pakistani general election in 1970 and Bangladeshi general election in 1973.

== Personal life ==
Samsuzzoha was married to Nagina Zoha. Three of his sons went on to win parliamentary elections – Salim Osman and Nasim Osman were elected from the Jatiya Party, and Shamim Osman is member of Parliament from Bangladesh Awami League.

Samsuzzoha died on 20 February 1987.
