= Narayanganj-5 =

Constituency of Bangladesh's Jatiya Sangsad

Coordinates: 23.63°N 90.50°E

- Constituency for the Jatiya Sangsad
- District: Narayanganj District
- Division: Dhaka Division
- Electorate: 485,288 (2026)

Current constituency
- Created: 1984
- Party: Bangladesh Nationalist Party
- Member: Abul Kalam
- ← 207 Narayanganj-4 209 Rajbari-1 →

Narayanganj-5 is a constituency represented in the Jatiya Sangsad (National Parliament) of Bangladesh since 2026 by Abul Kalam of the Bangladesh Nationalist Party.

== Boundaries ==
The constituency encompasses Narayanganj City Corporation wards 11-27 and Bandar Upazila.

== History ==
The constituency was created in 1984 from a Dhaka constituency when the former Dhaka District was split into six districts: Manikganj, Munshiganj, Dhaka, Gazipur, Narsingdi, and Narayanganj.

Ahead of the 2008 general election, the Election Commission redrew constituency boundaries to reflect population changes revealed by the 2001 Bangladesh census. The 2008 redistricting altered the boundaries of the constituency.

As of 2008, the constituency encompassed Narayanganj Municipality, Bandar Upazila and two union parishads of Narayanganj Sadar Upazila: Alirtek and Gognagar.

In 2011, Narayanganj City Corporation was formed by amalgamating three municipalities. Siddhriganj Municipality, in the north, became wards 1-9 of the new city. Narayanganj Municipality, in the south, became wards 10-18. Kadam Rasul Municipality, on the opposite bank of the Shitalakshya River, became wards 19-27.

For the 2014 general election, the commission described the constituency in terms of thanas, saying it encompassed two of the four thanas that made up Bandar Upazila, Narayanganj Sadar Upazila, and Narayanganj City Corportation: Bandar and Narayanganj. This change of nomenclature did not alter the geographical extent of the constituency.

Ahead of the 2018 general election, the Election Commission reduced the boundaries of the constituency by moving ward 10 of Naryanganj City Coporation to Narayanganj-4. What remained was Narayanganj City Corporation wards 11-27, Bandar Upazila, and two union parishads of Narayanganj Sadar Upazila: Alirtek and Gognagar.

In 2025, the Election Commission reduced the boundaries of the constituency by moving Alirtek and Gonagar union parishads to Naryanganj-4.

== Members of Parliament ==
Election	Member	Party
1986	Nasim Osman	Awami League
1988	Nasim Osman	Jatiya Party
1991	Abul Kalam	Bangladesh Nationalist Party
Feb 1996	Abul Kalam	Bangladesh Nationalist Party
Jun 1996	S. M. Akram	Awami League
2001	Abul Kalam	Bangladesh Nationalist Party
2008	Nasim Osman	Jatiya Party (Ershad)
2014	Nasim Osman	Jatiya Party (Ershad)
2014 by-election	Salim Osman	Jatiya Party (Ershad)
2018	Salim Osman	Jatiya Party (Ershad)
2024	Salim Osman	Jatiya Party (Ershad)
2026	Abul Kalam	Bangladesh Nationalist Party

== Elections ==
=== Elections in the 2020s ===
General Election 2026: Narayanganj-5
Party	Candidate	Votes	%	±%
BNP	Abul Kalam	114,799	43.1	N/A
Bangladesh Khelafat Majlis	ABM Sirajul Mamun	101,196	38.0	N/A
Independent	Md. Maksud Hossain	34,151	12.8	N/A
IAB	Mao Md. Masum Billah	7,708	2.9	N/A
Islamic Front	Syed Bahadur Shah Mujaddidi	4,650	1.7	N/A
CPB	Montu Chandra Ghosh	1,575	0.6	N/A
GSA	Tariqul Islam	1,023	0.4	N/A
GOP	Md. Nahid Hossain	643	0.2	N/A
BSD	Abu Naeem Khan Revolution	370	0.1	N/A
BSM	H.M. Amjad Hossain Mollah	242	0.1	N/A
Majority		13,603	5.1	N/A
Turnout		266,357	54.9	N/A
Registered electors		485,288		
BNP gain from JP(E)				

=== Elections in the 2010s ===
General Election 2018: Narayanganj-5
Party	Candidate	Votes	%	±%
JP(E)	Salim Osman	191,523	81.1	N/A
BNP	Abul Kalam	39,221	16.6	N/A
CPB	Montu Chandra Ghosh	3,517	1.5	N/A
Majority		152,302	64.5	N/A
Turnout		236,261	69.4	N/A
Registered electors		340,447		
JP(E) hold				

Nasim Osman died in April 2014. Salim Osman, his brother, was elected in a June by-election.

Nasim Osman was re-elected unopposed in the 2014 general election after opposition parties withdrew their candidacies in a boycott of the election.

=== Elections in the 2000s ===
General Election 2008: Narayanganj-5
Party	Candidate	Votes	%	±%
JP(E)	Nasim Osman	174,651	57.1	N/A
BNP	Abul Kalam	127,149	41.6	−1.4
CPB	Montu Ghosh	1,538	0.5	+0.3
BTF	Zahid Bahar Shaiploo	1,210	0.4	N/A
BSD	Abu Naeem Khan Biplob	827	0.3	N/A
BDB	Md. Delwar Hossain	220	0.1	N/A
Gano Forum	Md. Jahir Uddin	194	0.1	N/A
Majority		47,502	15.5	+9.1
Turnout		305,789	96.9	+20.1
JP(E) gain from BNP				

General Election 2001: Narayanganj-5
Party	Candidate	Votes	%	±%
BNP	Abul Kalam	73,013	43.0	+12.7
AL	S. M. Akram	62,232	36.7	−3.9
IJOF	Nasim Osman	32,166	19.0	N/A
Independent	Shahabuddin Ahmmad	462	0.3	N/A
BSD	G. M. Faruk	375	0.2	N/A
Independent	Md. Shombhu Hasan	375	0.2	N/A
CPB	Montu Ghosh	354	0.2	−0.1
Jatiya Party (M)	Md. Abdus Sattar	335	0.2	N/A
PGS	Gias Uddin Ahmed	136	0.1	N/A
Independent	Akteruzzaman	114	0.1	N/A
Independent	Shamsus Salehin	87	0.1	N/A
Majority		10,781	6.4	−4.0
Turnout		169,649	76.8	−2.9
BNP gain from AL				

=== Elections in the 1990s ===
General Election June 1996: Narayanganj-5
Party	Candidate	Votes	%	±%
AL	S. M. Akram	58,483	40.6	+10.2
BNP	Abul Kalam	43,562	30.3	−11.7
JP(E)	Nasim Osman	35,510	24.7	+4.1
Jamaat	Md. A. Qader	3,299	2.3	−2.1
Zaker Party	Khaja Mahiuddin	1,223	0.9	N/A
BIF	Md. Iqbal Sobahan	969	0.7	+0.4
Bangladesh Samajtantrik Dal (Khalekuzzaman)	G. M. Faruk	387	0.3	N/A
CPB	Montu Ghosh	355	0.3	+0.1
BKA	Hafez Muhammad Abu Saleh	185	0.1	N/A
Majority		14,921	10.4	+7.7
Turnout		143,973	79.7	+23.6
AL gain from BNP				

General Election 1991: Narayanganj-5
Party	Candidate	Votes	%	±%
BNP	Abul Kalam	53,300	42.0	
AL	Nazma Rahman	38,603	30.4	
JP(E)	Nasim Osman	26,143	20.6	
Jamaat	Md. Nazrul Islam	5,582	4.4	
FP	Khaja Mahiuddin	1,989	1.6	
BIF	Baki Billah	329	0.3	
Jatiya Janata Party and Gonotantrik Oikkya Jot	Gias Uddin Ahmed	303	0.2	
CPB	Montu Ghosh	296	0.2	
Jatiya Samajtantrik Dal-JSD	Tofazzol Hussein	274	0.2	
Majority		14,697	2.7	
Turnout		126,819	56.1	
BNP gain from JP(E)				
