= Ghiyas =

Ghiyas may refer to:

- Ghiyas, Iran, a village in West Azerbaijan Province, Iran
- Ghiyas ud din Balban (1200-1286), ruler of the Delhi Sultanate
- Mirza Ghiyas Beg (17th century), important Mughal official

== See also ==
- Ghiyath al-Din (disambiguation)
- Ghiya, an Indian gourd
