= Abdullah Al Amin =

Bangladeshi lawyer and politician

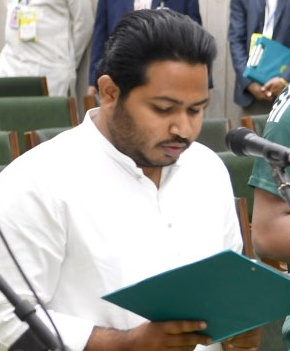
- Amin in 2026

Member of the Bangladesh Parliament for Narayanganj-4
- Incumbent
- Assumed office 17 February 2026
- Preceded by: Shamim Osman

Personal details
- Born: Abdullah Al Amin; September 4, 1995 (age 31) Narayanganj, Bangladesh
- Party: National Citizen Party
- Spouse: Segupta Nasrin
- Education: University of Dhaka
- Profession: Lawyer
- Known for: Coordinator; Students Against Discrimination; 2024 quota reform movement in Bangladesh

Abdullah Al Amin (Bengali: আব্দুল্লাহ আল আমিন; born 4 September 1995) is a Bangladeshi lawyer and politician. He is the head of discipline of the National Citizen Party. He was elected from Narayanganj-4 in the 13th Jatiya Sangsad election.

== Early life and education ==
Abdullah Al Amin was born on 4 September 1995 in Narayanganj, Bangladesh. He studied at the University of Dhaka.

== Politics ==
He contested the 13th Jatiya Sangsad election from the Narayanganj-4 constituency with the nomination of the 11-party electoral alliance and the National Citizen Party. He received 106,171 votes and was unofficially declared elected.
