= M. A. Sattar =

Bangladeshi industrialist and politician (1925–2009)

- এম এ সাত্তার ایم اے ستار

4th Chief Whip of Parliament
- In office 15 April 1988 – 6 December 1990
- Speaker: Shamsul Huda Chowdhury
- Preceded by: T.I.M. Fazlay Rabbi Chowdhury
- Succeeded by: Khandaker Delwar Hossain

Member of Parliament
- In office 10 July 1986 – 6 December 1990
- Preceded by: Position established
- Succeeded by: Sirajul Islam
- Constituency: Narayanganj-4

Minister of Labor and Manpower
- In office July 1986 – March 1987
- Prime Minister: Mizanur Rahman Chowdhury

Minister of Jute and Textiles
- In office July 1985 – April 1986
- Prime Minister: Ataur Rahman Khan
- Preceded by: Sultan Ahmad
- Succeeded by: Sultan Mahmud

Advisor to the President of Bangladesh
- In office 1983–1985
- President: Hussain Muhammad Ershad

Personal details
- Born: Mohammad Abdus Sattar; 1 March 1925 Durgapur, Rangpur, Bengal Presidency, British India
- Died: 5 June 2009 (aged 84) Dhaka Bangladesh
- Resting place: Masdair Graveyard: British subject (1925–1947); Pakistani (1947–1971); Bangladeshi (1971)
- Party: Jatiya Party
- Other political affiliations: East Pakistan Awami Muslim League (1949–1971)
- Occupation: Industrialist; Politician

Mohammad Abdus Sattar (Bengali: মোহাম্মদ আবদুস সাত্তার, Urdu: محمد عبدالستار; 1 March 1925 – 5 June 2009), known as M. A. Sattar (এম এ সাত্তার), was a prominent Bangladeshi business magnate and politician. He was the founding chairman and managing director of Sattar & Company Ltd., Sattar Jute Mills Ltd., Hasna Shipbuilding & Navigation Ltd., and Rangpur Industries Ltd. In the 1980s, Sattar held several cabinet ministry positions, was elected as a member of parliament twice, and was chief whip in President Ershad's government from 1988 to 1990.

== Early life and education ==
Sattar was born on 1 March 1925, to Tofazzal Hossain and Hasna, a Bengali Muslim family in Durgapur, Rangpur, Bengal Presidency, British India (now Bangladesh). After completing his education in Rangpur and Kolkata, he entered the jute trade.

== East Pakistan period ==
=== Business career ===
Sattar founded Sattar & Company Ltd. in 1948 on 262 acres of land on the banks of the Shitalakshya River in Narayanganj.

In 1963–64, he was elected the first Bengali chairman of the then Pakistan Jute Association (PJA), and he was re-elected in 1965 and 1967. Sattar represented PJA at a number of conferences internationally and advocated for the interests of the Pakistan jute industry.

During his tenure as chairman of the PJA, the jute industry faced several challenges, including the loss of market monopoly, declining production, export limitations, smuggling, policy reforms, and the devaluation of sterling. Revisions of short-term policies weakened Pakistan's position, allowing rival countries like India, Thailand, and Burma to increase their jute production. Pakistani jute production witnessed a decline of 4.76% in the 1963–64 season. Export limitations, minimum prices, and duties imposed further hindered the industry's competitiveness. Smuggling activities resulted in substantial financial losses. The devaluation of sterling introduced additional obstacles due to fluctuating exchange rates, impacting jute exports and industry stability.

To address these challenges, Sattar proposed streamlining the jute licensing procedure by eliminating hindrances like police verification. He advocated for the abolition of the Agricultural Income Tax, which only added to the price of jute without providing any benefit to the growers. He sought to enhance access to bank finance at reduced interest rates to encourage investment within the sector. He emphasized the importance of implementing effective measures to combat smuggling activities to safeguard the industry's interests. At the conclusion of his tenure, the PJA acknowledged Sattar for his leadership in negotiating new gradations with overseas delegates, as well as for his efforts in addressing challenges arising from the devaluation of sterling. His efforts were well received by the broader jute community.

He also held the positions of vice-chairman and chairman of the Pakistan Jute Mills Association (PJMA).

Over the years, he expanded his business to other industries and founded Hasna Shipbuilding & Navigation Ltd., Rangpur Industries Ltd., Tobacco Industries Ltd., and Sattar Jute Mills. Over 10 thousand workers used to work in Sattar Jute Mills.

Sattar was made director of Australasia Bank Ltd. and Great Eastern Insurance Co.

During this period, Sattar was commonly listed as one of the wealthiest families in East Pakistan, ranked tenth, with five institutions and assets worth 30 million rupees (equivalent to US$6.3 million in 1970).

=== Bangladesh Liberation War (1971) ===
Sattar, as one of the few Bengali industrialists and due to his close association with Sheikh Mujibur Rahman, was targeted for elimination during Operation Searchlight. On 27 March 1971, Pakistani soldiers entered his home, "Rangpur House Massdair", in Narayanganj and immediately shot and killed his eldest son, Taufique Sattar (তৌফিক সাত্তার), and his friend Jalal Ahmed (জালাল আহমেদ). The soldiers ceased their attack when they saw a coveted civil award of Pakistan that had been given to Sattar for his contributions to the economy of Pakistan, thereby sparing his life along with the rest of his family.

== Post-independence activities ==
After the independence of Bangladesh, the Bangladeshi government added socialism to the constitution of Bangladesh and nationalized most industries, which resulted in Sattar losing ownership of his industries, including Sattar Jute Mills. The jute mills were placed under the Bangladesh Jute Mills Corporation.

Sattar organized Bengali jute mill owners and formed the Bangalees Jute Mills Entrepreneurs Society Ltd. (BJMES) to struggle for the return of the nationalized jute and cotton mills to their former Bengali owners. BJMES demanded compensation of around Tk 90 million for the 34 jute mills that were previously owned by Bengali entrepreneurs and were nationalized by the Bangladesh government.

During a press conference in Dhaka on 12 March 1974, Mr. M.A. Sattar pointed out that the Bengali entrepreneurs had continued to serve as heads of their mills after liberation until the boards of directors and managing director positions were abolished. However, their roles and responsibilities were never clearly defined, and their expertise was not effectively utilized.

Sattar strongly believed that jute mills should be operated on commercial principles rather than being treated as government departments. He proposed the establishment of an advisory council for all previously Bengali-owned mills, as well as a managing committee for each enterprise. The managing committee would consist of a representative from financial institutions, two from the entrepreneurs, and one from the workers community.

As chairman, Sattar presented arguments highlighting the significant losses and damage caused by nationalization in various sectors of the economy, including jute mills and the cotton textile industry. They provided statistics showing a decline in annual output per hessian loom from 16.4 tons in 1969/70 to 10.8 tons in 1975/76. Similar decreases were observed in carpet backing and sacking looms. These statistics served to illustrate the adverse effects of nationalization on sectors that are typically operated on commercial grounds.

During this nationalization period, most industries suffered devastating losses due to rising costs, the devaluation of the taka, and internal corruption. The jute industry never recovered and incurred heavy operating losses throughout the coming decades.

In 1982, the implementation of the New Industrial Policy (NIP) marked a significant milestone in the privatization efforts and brought about notable changes in the industrial policy landscape. As part of these reforms, 27 textile mills and 33 jute mills, including Sattar Jute Mills, were returned to their original owners. During the hand-over negotiations, buyers attempted to limit their liability to the period before 1972, stating they should not be held responsible for the liabilities built up during 1972–82, when the firms were operated by the government. After prolonged and frequently bitter debate, they were ultimately forced to accept responsibility for all accumulated liabilities and to absorb the existing workforce under terms that prohibited termination, regardless of prevailing economic and market conditions, after President Ershad presented the buyers with a "take it or leave it" ultimatum. Faced with this ultimatum, Sattar and the mill owners felt they had no realistic choice but to accept the terms, even though they believed the price demanded was unreasonably high. It was during this time that Sattar entered politics.

=== Political career ===
In 1983, he was appointed an adviser to President Hussain Muhammad Ershad with the rank and status of a cabinet minister.

From July 1985 to April 1986, he served as the jute minister in the cabinet of President Ershad. Sattar introduced several measures to enhance the jute industry in Bangladesh, which included modernization of jute mills, promoting jute-based industries, and diversifying jute products. During his term, he focused on developing new markets for jute goods and increased the country's jute exports. Sattar worked to improve the production and export of jute. He emphasized expanding the jute industry and increasing the use of jute in various sectors. He then went on to serve as the minister of labor and manpower from July 1986 to March 1987.

He was elected twice as a Jatiya Party candidate to represent the Narayanganj-4 constituency in parliament, first in 1986 and then again in 1988. During his second term, he held the position of chief whip for the Jatiya Party in the 4th Jatiya Sangsad from 1988 to 1990. As chief whip, Sattar was responsible for ensuring discipline among members of the ruling party and their attendance in parliamentary sessions. He played a significant part in maintaining the party's discipline and attendance in the parliament, particularly during crucial voting sessions. He worked to enhance the Bangladesh Jatiya Party's influence in parliament and strengthen its alliances with other political parties.

In the 1991 Bangladeshi general election, Sattar ran for office once more but did not succeed, receiving 11.7% of the votes.

== Personal life ==
M.A. Sattar was involved in social and cultural activities in his local community, and engaged in philanthropic activities. He was a patron of several educational institutions and social organizations in his constituency. In 1967, Sattar was elected as the first Bengali president of Narayanganj Club.

In 1980, Sattar established a secondary school named Sattar Jute Mills Model High School in Rupganj, Narayanganj. In the beginning it was established for the children of officials and workers working in the jute mills, but over time the children of local residents also got the opportunity to read in this school. The school has been developed further with a 4-storey modern building and a vast playground by the new landlords. He also established a mosque for prayer near the school.

To pay off the debts of the jute mills, he had to sell most of his assets throughout the years. In 2005, he sold Sattar Jute Mills, including the full-fledged factory buildings, warehouses, and remaining 55 acres with a riverfront, to industrialist Anisur Rahman Sinha, the owner of the Sinha Group.

M.A. Sattar died on 5 June 2009, at the age of 84.
