= Ghiyath al-Din =

Ghiyath al-Din (Arabic: غیاث الدین), also transcribed as Ghiyāthu'd-Dīn, Ghiyasuddin, etc. is the name of many persons in the Islamic world. It may refer to:

== People ==
- Ghiyath ad-Din Muhammad Tapar (died 1118), Sultan of the Seljuk Empire
- Ghiyath al-Din Abu'l-Fath Umar ibn Ibrahim Al-Nishapuri al-Khayyami, better known as Omar Khayyam, (1048–1131), Persian scientist and poet
- Ghiyasuddin Iwaz Shah (1150–1227), Ruler of Bengal
- Ghiyath al-Din Muhammad (fl. 1176–1200), ruler of the Ghorid dynasty in Khorāsān
- Ghīyāth al-Dīn Kaykhusraw bin Qilij Arslān, or Kaykhusraw I (died 1211), Seljuk Sultan of Rum
- Ghīyāth al-Dīn Kaykhusraw bin Kayqubād, or Kaykhusraw II (died 1246), Seljuk Sultan of Rum
- Ghīyāth al-Dīn Kaykhusraw bin Qilij Arslān, or Kaykhusraw III (died 1284), Seljuk Sultan of Rum
- Ghiyas ud din Balban (1200–1287), Sultan of Delhi
- Ghiyath al-Din Tughluq (died 1325), Sultan of Delhi
- Ghiyasuddin Bahadur Shah (died 1328), Sultan of Lakhnauti
- Ghiyas al-Din ibn Rashid al-Din, (died 1336), Ilkhanate politician
- Ghiyasuddin Tughluq Khan (died 1389), Sultan of Delhi
- Ghiyasuddin Baysunghur (1397–1433) son and associate of the Timurid ruler Shah Rukh in Herat
- Ghiyāth al-dīn Naqqāsh (fl. 1419–1422), the diarist of a Persian embassy to China
- Ghiyāth al-Dīn Jamshīd ibn Masʾūd al-Kāshī, or just Jamshīd al-Kāshī (c. 1380–1429), Persian astronomer and mathematician
- Ghiyasuddin Azam Shah (1390–1411), Sultan of Bengal
- Ghiyāth al-Dīn ʿAlī Iṣfahānī, fifteenth century, scholar in Badakhshān
- Ghiyath al-Din Shah Rukh Shahi Khan, Sultan of Kashmir
- Ghiyath Shah (1469–1500), Sultan of Malwa
- Ghiyasuddin Mahmud Shah (deposed 1538), Sultan of Bengal
- Ghiyasuddin Bahadur Shah II (r. 1555–1561), Sultan of Bengal
- Ghiyasuddin Jalal Shah (died 1563), Sultan of Bengal
- Muhammed Ghiya'as ud-din (fl. 1766–1773), Sultan of the Maldives
- Musa Ghiatuddin Riayat Shah of Selangor (1893–1955), Sultan of Selangor
- Ghayasuddin Pathan (1897–1963), Bengali politician
- Ghiasuddin Ahmad (born 1927), Indian-Bengali politician
- Ghyasuddin Ahmed (1933–1971), Bengali lecturer and historian
- Ghayasuddin Siddiqui (born 1939?), British-Pakistani academic and political activist
- T. M. Giasuddin Ahmed (1937–2020), Bangladeshi politician and former minister
- Muhammad Gias Uddin (born 1952), Bangladeshi politician
- Gias Uddin Ahmed (1954–2002), Bangladeshi politician and army officer
- Giasuddin Molla (born 1956), Indian-Bengali politician
- Giasuddin Selim, Bangladeshi film director
- Giasuddin Al Mamun, Bangladeshi businessman and owner of Channel 1
- Giasuddin Quader Chowdhury, Bangladeshi politician
- Gias Uddin Chowdhury, Bangladeshi politician
- Gyasuddin Shaikh, Indian politician

== Places ==
- Ghiyasuddin International School, Malé, Maldives. – School named after Sultan Muhammed Ghiya'as ud-din.
- Giasuddin Islamic Model College, Narayanganj, Bangladesh. – School named after former MP Muhammad Gias Uddin.

== See also ==
- A. K. Muhammad Ghaus Uddin (died 2019), Bangladeshi politician
