= Shamim Osman =

Bangladeshi politician

- শামীম ওসমান
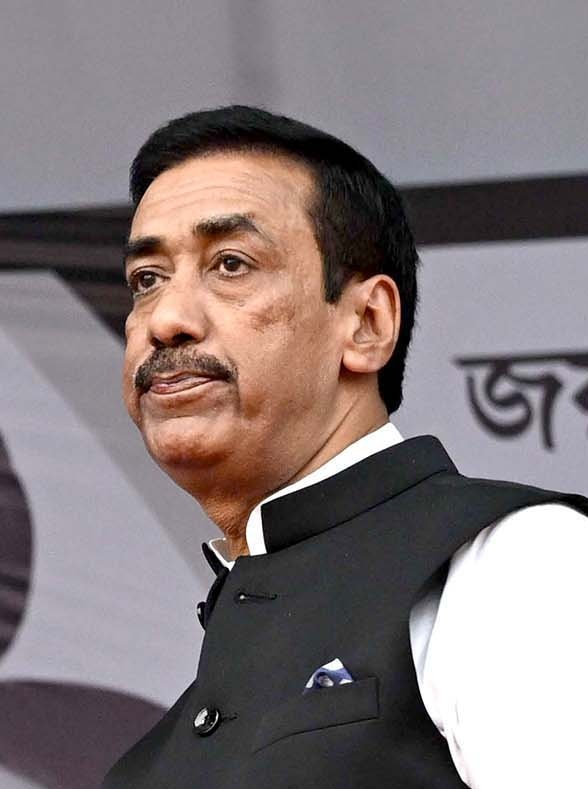
- Osman in 2024

Member of Parliament
- In office 5 January 2014 – 6 August 2024
- Preceded by: Kabori Sarwar
- Succeeded by: Abdullah Al Amin
- Constituency: Narayanganj-4
- In office 23 June 1996 – 15 July 2001
- Preceded by: Sirajul Islam
- Succeeded by: Muhammad Gias Uddin
- Constituency: Narayanganj-4

Personal details
- Born: 28 February 1961 (age 65) Narayanganj, East Pakistan, Pakistan
- Party: Bangladesh Awami League
- Spouse: Lipi Begum
- Children: Ayon Osman (son)
- Parent: AKM Samsuzzoha (father)
- Relatives: Osman family
- Education: University of Dhaka

Shamim Osman (Bengali: শামীম ওসমান; born 28 February 1961) is a politician from Bangladesh who belongs to Awami League. He is a former Jatiya Sangsad member representing the Narayanganj-4 constituency.

== Early life and family ==
Osman was born on 28 February 1961 to a Bengali Muslim political family in Narayanganj, East Pakistan. His family belongs to a Pradhan clan from Jamalkandi in present-day Comilla. His father, Abul Khayer Mohammad Shamsuzzoha, along with his elder brothers, Nasim Osman and Salim Osman of the Jatiya Party, all served as MPs in Narayanganj. His grandfather, Mohammad Osman Ali, was a founding member of the Awami League.

Osman is a graduate of the University of Dhaka.

== Career ==
Osman was elected as a member of parliament at the 7th National Parliamentary Elections in June 1996 from Narayanganj-4. Osman received 73,349 votes while his nearest rival, Sirajul Islam of the Bangladesh Nationalist Party, received 63,866 votes. He contested the 2001 Bangladeshi general election as a candidate of Awami League from Narayanganj-4 and lost. He received 106,104 votes, while the winner, Muhammad Gias Uddin of Bangladesh Nationalist Party received 137,323. After losing the position in 2001, he went on self-exile in India and Canada.

Bangladesh Police searched Osman's home in Narayanganj on 24 November 2003 when he was in Canada.

In November 2004, Osman's political rival, Mominullah Liton, also known as David, was killed in a crossfire by the Rapid Action Battalion.

On 1 May 2007, Osman was sentenced to jail for three years in a case filed by the Anti-Corruption Commission. On 14 August, a court ordered his property to be seized for tax evasion. In September 2007, the Anti-Corruption Commission sued Osman and his wife for illegal wealth and submitted the charge sheet in April 2008. On 12 September, he was sentenced to eight years imprisonment in a tax evasion case.

On 12 January 2009, Justices A. B. M. Khairul Haque and Md Abdul Hye of the Bangladesh High Court rejected Osman's petition seeking bail in three cases filed by the ⁣⁣Anti-Corruption Commission and the National Board of Revenue. After around eight years, Osman came back to Narayanganj in April 2009 when Bangladesh Awami League party returned to power. On 11 February, he received bail in two cases in which he was sentenced to three and eight years imprisonment. In 2011, he lost the Narayanganj City Mayoral election to Selina Hayat Ivy. He had received 78,000 votes in the city election. On 7 April 2011, High Court squashed the Anti-Corruption Commission case in which he was sentenced to three years imprisonment.

Osman was accused by Samrat Hossain Emily, a former national football player, of assaulting him in October 2013. On 8 March 2013, a 17-year-old student Tanvir Mohammad Toki, as found dead in Narayanganj two days after he had gone missing. The victim's father, Rafiur Rabbi, accused Osman's family of the killing of his son. On 25 March, High Court denied anticipatory bail to Osman and his son Ayon Osman. Osman filed a defamation lawsuit against Ivy.

For the 2014 Bangladesh general election, the party picked Osman to contest for Narayanganj-4 constituency, dropping the incumbent Kabori Sarwar. He was elected unopposed after the main Bangladesh Nationalist Party boycotted the election. By 2014, Awami League in Narayanganj had divided into two factions, one loyal to Osman and the other to Ivy. He had threatened ASP Mohammad Bashiruddin for not allowing Awami League activists to stuff ballots.

Osman was re-elected to parliament from Narayanganj in the 2018 Bangladeshi general election as a candidate of Awami League. He received 393,136 votes while his nearest rival, Monir Hossein of Bangladesh Nationalist Party, received 76,582.

He won the 2024 general election by attaining 195,827 votes, according to national statistics, which was canceled after 5 August 2024. The International Crimes Tribunal issued an arrest warrant against him on 30 April 2025, for organizing violent attacks on the movement protestors before the end of his tenure as the member of parliament. His residency was vandalized by protesters at 6 February 2025. His house was again burned down on 18 November 2026.

== Popular culture ==
Khela Hobe (English: The game is on) is a popular political slogan in Bangladesh and India, especially in West Bengal and Assam. The slogan was first used by Osman. Prominent politicians from India, notably Mamata Banerjee, have used 'Khela Hobe' repeatedly.
