= Salim Osman =

Bangladeshi politician

- সেলিম ওসমান

Member of the Bangladesh Parliament for Narayanganj-5
- In office June 2014 – 6 August 2024
- Preceded by: Nasim Osman

Personal details
- Born: 26 October 1958 (age 67)
- Party: Jatiya Party (Ershad)
- Relations: Osman family
- Parent: AKM Samsuzzoha (father)
- Occupation: Politician, businessman

Salim Osman (born 26 Oct 1958) is a Bangladesh Jatiya Party politician and a former member of Jatiya Sangsad representing Narayanganj-5, the constituency of his deceased elder brother.

== Career ==
In 2014, Osman was elected president of Bangladesh Knitwear Manufacturers and Exporters Association. In June 2014, he was elected to parliament from the Narayanganj-5, after the death of the former representative, Nasim Osman, his older brother.

On 13 May 2016, Osman publicly shamed the headmaster of a school at Narayanganj's Bandar Upazila for allegedly insulting Islam. The incident was recorded and published on YouTube. The headmaster, Shyamal Kanti Bhakta, filed a charge of assault against him. In October 2018, a Dhaka court discharged Osman from the case.

== Personal life ==
Osman's father AKM Samsuzzoha and elder brother Shamim Osman were former members of parliament from Bangladesh Awami League.
