= Osman family =

Political family in Bangladesh

Osman family ওসমান পরিবার
- Family
- Parent family: Pradhan
- Country: Bangladesh
- Current region: Bengal
- Origin: Narayanganj
- Founded: c. 1920
- Founder: M Osman Ali
- Current head: Shamim Osman
- Traditions: Sunni Islam

Osman family is a political family in Bangladesh. Based in Narayanganj, the family was founded by politician M Osman Ali. During the July Uprising, members of the family left Narayanganj.

== Origin ==
The family originated through politician M Osman Ali, who came to Narayanganj from the Comilla region of Bengal Presidency, British India in the 1920s. After achieving success in business, he built his residence, "Baitul Aman", in Chashara, Narayanganj, in 1935 and settled there permanently. He supported the Pakistan Movement and joined the Bengal Provincial Muslim League. He contested the 1946 provincial election and was elected a member of the Bengal Legislative Assembly. However, after the creation of Pakistan, when his party became divided between elitists and progressives, he supported the progressives. In 1949, when the progressive faction of the party formed the East Pakistan Awami Muslim League, he joined the new party. He subsequently died in 1971. His son AKM Samsuzzoha was also a politician and served as a member of the East Pakistan Provincial Assembly. He was a member of the Awami League and was elected a member of the National Parliament of independent Bangladesh in 1973.

== History ==
After 1975, the family fell into a political crisis and experienced a decline in the business world. However, their circumstances improved after 1981. AKM Shamsuzzohha's son AKM Nasim Osman joined the Jatiya Party in the 1980s and was elected as a member of parliament several times, including in 1986. After AKM Samsuzzoha's another son AKM Shamim Osman became a member of parliament in 1996, Shamim reportedly took control of Narayanganj through an alleged gang system. Although his downfall came in the 2001 election, he again established his dominance in Narayanganj in 2014, joined by his son Ayon Osman. Following the death of AKM Nasim Osman in the same year, his brother AKM Selim Osman became a member of parliament and gained an opportunity to establish dominance in Narayanganj's business world. On the eve of the 2018 election, Nasim's wife Parvin Osman contested against candidate Selim, who made negative comments about Parvin multiple times during the election campaign. During the COVID-19 pandemic in Bangladesh in 2020, the Osman family carried out charitable activities to gain the trust of the people of Narayanganj District. In the election for Narayanganj City Corporation in 2022, 10 councilor candidates supported by the Osman family were elected, three fewer than the number of candidates elected in the previous election. In 2023, without naming, Selim accused two members of his family of terrorism. In 2024, during the July Uprising, members of the family disappeared from the area. Following the fall of the government, angry crowds attacked and damaged their family-owned immovable properties. Shamim was subsequently reportedly seen in Delhi and Dubai. Subsequently, as the Anti-Corruption Commission began investigating the family's alleged illicit assets, the members began selling their properties for financial gain.

== Legacy ==
After 1996, Fatulla Stadium was named after M Osman Ali, the family's ancestor. In 2021, the government finalized the decision to name Third Shitalakshya Bridge in Narayanganj after AKM Nasim Osman of the Osman family, the Dhaka–Narayanganj link road after AKM Samsuzzoha, and the Chashara–Adamjee EPZ road after Nagina Joha, the wife of AKM Samsuzzoha.

Arild Engelsen Ruud, a researcher on South Asia and cultural and professor of the University of Oslo, described the family as a "dynasty" that developed in Bangladesh through the combination of legitimate political mobilization with financial activities and leadership like a Latin American-style criminal system, but began to weaken after the fourth generation.

== Members ==
- M Osman Ali (1900–1971), businessman and politician
- Jamila Osman, homemaker, wife of M Osman Ali
- Amirun Nessa Begum, politician, wife of M Osman Ali
- AKM Samsuzzoha (1922–1987), politician, son of M Osman Ali
- Mostafa Sarwar, politician, son of M Osman Ali
- Nagina Joha (1935–2026), member of the Zamindar family of Kashemnagar, wife of AKM Samsuzzohha
- AKM Nasim Osman (1953–2014), politician, son of AKM Samsuzzohha
- AKM Selim Osman (born 1958), businessman and politician, son of AKM Samsuzzohha
- AKM Shamim Osman (born 1961), politician, son of AKM Samsuzzohha
- Parvin Osman, politician, wife of AKM Nasim Osman
- Nasrin Osman, social worker, wife of AKM Selim Osman
- Salma Osman Lippi, politician and social worker, wife of AKM Shamim Osman
- Azmeri Osman, businessman, son of AKM Nasim Osman
- Sabrina Osman Joya, wife of Azmeri Osman
- Irin Osman, daughter of AKM Nasim Osman
- Afrin Osman, daughter of AKM Nasim Osman
- Anannya Sharmin, daughter of AKM Selim Osman
- Farhana Sharmin, daughter of AKM Selim Osman
- Rumana Sharmin, daughter of AKM Selim Osman
- Imtinan Ayon Osman, businessman, son of AKM Shamim Osman
- Labiba Joha Angana, daughter of AKM Shamim Osman
- Irfana Osman Reshmi, granddaughter of Mahiuddin Ahmed Khoka and wife of Imtinan Ayon Osman
- Ifraim Osman Arzian (born 2019), son of Imtinan Ayon Osman
