= Gaeth =

Defunct American motor vehicle manufacturer

- Industry: Automotive
- Founded: 1902
- Founder: Paul Gaeth
- Defunct: 1911
- Fate: Receivership, assets and brand sold to Stuyvesant Motor Car Company
- Headquarters: Cleveland, Ohio
- Products: Automobiles, commercial vehicles
- Production output: Around 100 (1908)

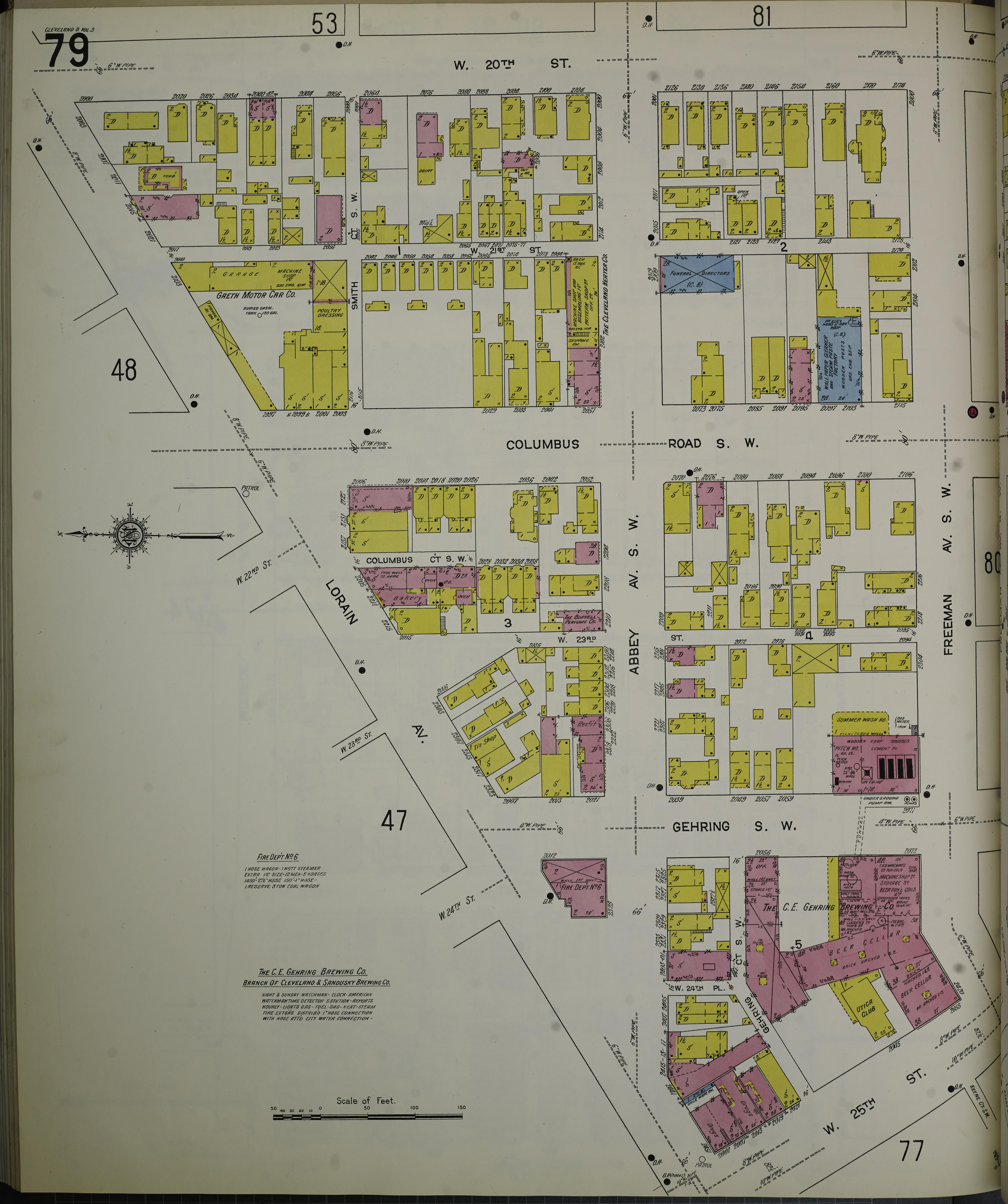
Gaeth plant (1912)

Gaeth was an American automobile manufacturer based in Cleveland, Ohio, which operated from 1902 until 1911. The company was founded and led by Paul Gaeth for most of the company's existence. The brand made one-, two-, three- and four-cylinder gasoline cars, and a single-cylinder commercial van. Distribution was focused on the Cleveland area and production was very low, even for the standards of the day. Sales likely never reached much more than 100 cars per year.

== History ==
=== Founding ===
The Gaeth car was created by Cleveland resident Paul Gaeth. He spent the late 1800s building bicycles and stationary engine. In 1898 he built an experimental steam car, and, later that year, a gasoline car. In 1900, he joined the People's Automobile Company as the superintendent. He left the position in 1902 when the company went bankrupt.

After People's Automotive Company's bankruptcy, Gaeth partnered with a local businessman and formed the Gaeth Automobile Company at 54 Warden Street. Initially the firm only produced cars on a special-order basis out of a small machine shop. The cars were initially sold under the Gaethmobile brand name.

=== Gaeth Automobile Company ===
By October 1903 total production was 24 cars since inception.

In late October 1904, after producing one-cylinder cars (and apparently a single two-cylinder car) Gaeth expanded their product offering to include a three-cylinder touring car known as the Gaeth Triplex.

In 1905 the three-cylinder Triplex was discontinued, and the 1905 lineup instead included a four-cylinder and two-cylinder car. Distribution was still largely regional as opposed to the larger firms who would market to the whole country and even other nations, but in late 1905 plans were being made for a larger factory and more expansive distribution network. The plant was being provided by outside funding. Another development for 20–5 was a still unnamed 50 horsepower model.

The company offered three four-cylinder models for 1906: The 20–24 horsepower Type G, the 30–40 horsepower Type H, and the 50–54 horsepower Type J. A commercial wagon, known as the Model K, was also offered starting in the middle of the year.

For the 1907 model year the company offered a 35 horsepower four-cylinder model known as the Type XII.

Over the course of three days in September 1907 a reliability run was held in Cleveland. Eight cars would have their hoods sealed and then driven a route of over 150 miles each day. The competing cars were two Buicks, two Cartercars, two Jacksons, a Mora and a Gaeth Type K Delivery Wagon. Points were deducted for each stop and repair. During the contest it rained heavily and cars were skidding and failing in the muddy roads. The Gaeth was the only car to score a perfect score during the trial. Granted the trail had a much lower turnout than hoped for.

Six years after being formed the company was still extremely small, production for 1908 was estimated to be 75 to 100 cars for the whole year. To expand, the company would be reorganized and incorporated with a capitalization of $100,000. Paul Gaeth remained as president, and R.P. Hawkins was made vice president. For the 1908 model year the company would use another four-cylinder model known as the Type XV which was almost identical to the previous year's model.

In mid 1909 the company expanded its repair, paint, and finishing shops. and would report "Business at present we have found to be rather steady and we expect this condition to hold for the remainder the present year or there may of course be a small increase in general business activity" The cars for the next few years would be very slightly modified variants of the Type XV.

=== Gaeth Motor Company ===
In late July 1910 the assets of the Gaeth Automobile company were transferred to a new firm called the Gaeth Motor Company. The new firm was incorporated at $400,000. Paul Gaeth who was in Europe at the time, was apparently in poor health and might have offloaded the company to new investors as a result. As part of the reorganization, a new factory was planned and production was hoped to be increased from anywhere from 100 to 500 cars a year. As another part of the reorganization the company would move from Cleveland to Pittsburgh.

=== Discontinuation ===
It is unclear at this point what happened to the Gaeth Automobile Company and the Gaeth Motor Company. In November 1910 it was reported that the Gaeth Automobile Company had fallen into the hands of a receiver. The newly formed Stuyvesant Motor Car Company of Cleveland purchased the assets and moved the factory to Sandusky. For 1911, Stuyvesant planned to build 200 Gaeth cars and 100 of their own namesake cars. It is unclear if the reorganization did not go through, or if the new firm was mislabeled as the old firm. Regardless of these facts, no more mention is made of either firm after 1910.

== Innovations ==
=== Make and Break Ignition ===
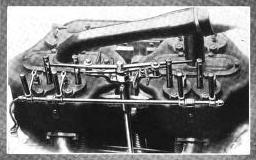
Gaeth Ignition System

Gaeth would patent and heavily market its so-called "make and break ignition system" around 1906. This system would be a major selling point on all Gaeth four-cylinder cars after its introduction. It was a low tension ignition system that also was able to facilitate starting the car (the only of its kind according to Gaeth). The ignition system would be composed of a vertical shaft running between the cylinder pairs; the vertical shaft would be connected to the engine by means of a gear running off of the intake manifold. From the vertical shaft the system would be described as:

"To the top of the vertical shaft is fastened a pair of small cranks connected to which are four horizontal push rods for tripping the contact arms of the ignitors The times of tripping are regulated by four small eccentrics carried on vertical spindles and against which the push rods are caused to bear by means of coiled springs It is seen that as the cranks revolve the operative ends of the push rods will be given a combination reciprocating and side motion through their engagement with the eccentrics thus permit ting of controlling their tripping action through the eccentrics Each ignitor has a moving member or contact arm which is brought into contact with its stationary electrode by means of one of the horizontal push rods. By making the spiral gear on the camshaft of sufficient length a range of action is secured by the spark lever such that the ignitor nearest the firing point may be snapped off thus causing a spark within the cylinder and enabling the motor to start on compression"

== Models ==
=== Gaethmobile ===
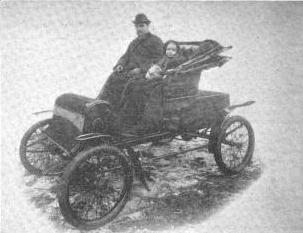
1902 Gaethmobile

The first production model was introduced in 1902 and was known as the Gaethmobile. It was a two-seat runabout with a single-cylinder horizontal engine underneath the rear of the body. RPM varied between 200 and 1000. Top speed was 30 miles an hour. There were two forward speeds and a reverse from a planetary transmission. It was right hand drive and used a tiller to steer. The Gaethmobile weighed 1,200 pounds and was sold on an order only basis.

=== Gaeth Triplex ===
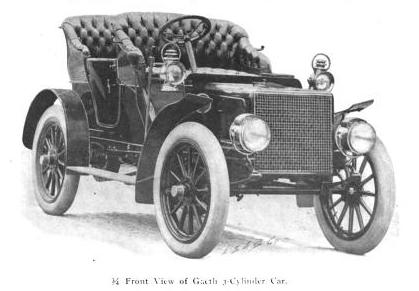
1904 Gaeth Triplex

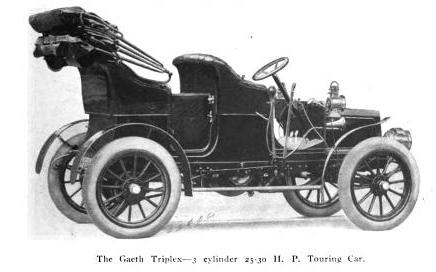
1904 Gaeth Triplex Rear

The Gaeth Triplex was introduced sometime in 1904. The car was powered by a three-cylinder horizontal gasoline engine making 25–30 horsepower; the hood did not contain the engine, and the engine was under the seats like many early touring cars. The advertised body was a side entrance touring car. Cooling was by thermo-syphon, and the car had a two-speed planetary transmission and reverse. Top speed was 50 miles an hour; engine speed was between 150 and 1200 RPM. The car was right hand drive with a steering wheel by Brown-Lipe and a foot throttle. Two brakes were employed, a service brake that operated on the differential which was controlled by a foot lever, and an emergency brake that operated on the rear wheels that was controlled by a lever. Wheelbase was 100 inches.

=== Type H ===
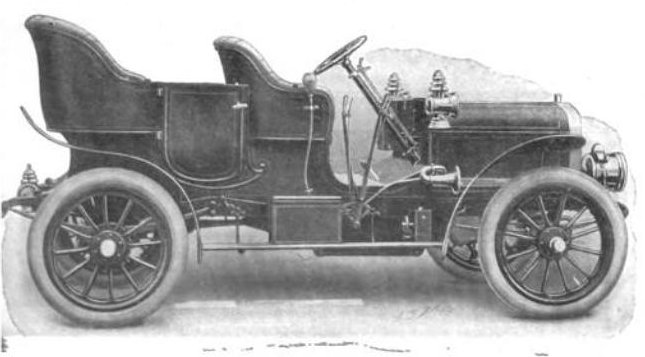
1906 Gaeth Type H Touring Car

The Type H was available for 1906. It was the middle model in the 1906 lineup. It made 30–40 horsepower out of a vertical four-cylinder engine (as opposed to the horizontal three-cylinder in the Triplex). The cylinders were cast in pairs. There were three forward gears and a reverse from a sliding gear transmission. Cooling was by thermo-siphon. There were two sets of brakes, a service brake controlled by a foot pedal that acted on the outside of the rear drums, and an emergency brake that was operated by a hand lever that worked on the inside of the rear drum brakes. Two bodies were offered, a side entrance "King of the Belgians" tonneau, and the second was a surrey. The seats were leather, and there was a trunk that could be accessed from behind the car. Five lamps, horn, and tools were standard.

=== Type K Delivery Wagon ===
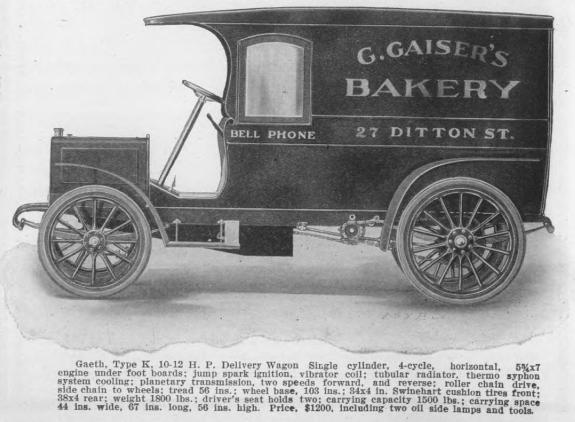
Gaeth Model K Delivery Wagon

The Model K did not share engines with the larger models; instead, it would employ a single-cylinder gasoline engine making 10–12 horsepower. It used a two-speed planetary transmission which had a reverse. The vehicle weighed 1,800 pounds and could carry up to 1,500 pounds. The wheelbase was 103 inches, and steering was by steering wheel. Final Drive was by chain. The price was $1200 for 1906.

=== Type XII ===
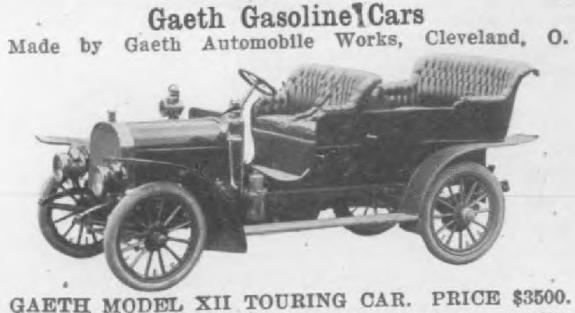
1907 Gaeth Type XII Touring Car

The Type XII would be unveiled in late 1906 as a 1907 model. It employed a 35-horsepower water-cooled four-cylinder engine. Ignition would be by a magneto, and the car would have three forward speeds from a sliding gear transmission. Two brakes would be on the car, a service brake acting on the outside of the brake drums which was operated by a foot pedal, and an emergency brake acting on the inside of the drums operated by a hand lever. The wheelbase was 112 inches, and the car weighed 2700 pounds. The listed price for late 1906 was $3500; this price included lamps and tools.

=== Type XV ===
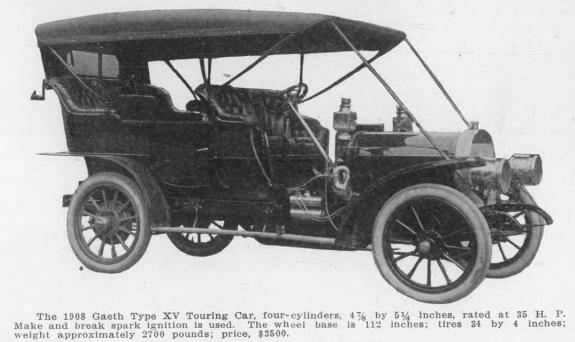
1908 Gaeth Type XV Touring Car

The Type XV was "the leading model" for 1908. It was very similar in appearance to the Type XII, and it made 35 horsepower from a four-cylinder engine that was slightly enlarged. Other details are largely the same as the Type XII. Price was $3500.

=== Type XX ===
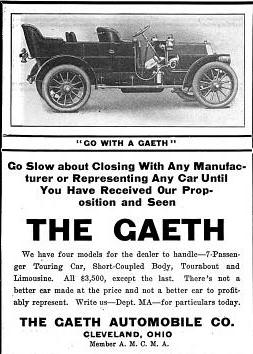
1909 Gaeth Model XX Touring Car Advertisement

The Model XX would again be a slightly modified previous model. The XX would be introduced in 1908 for the 1909 model year. It would be rated at 38 horsepower. Three models would be advertised: a roadster and touring car for $3,500, and a limousine for $4,500.

=== Type XXI ===
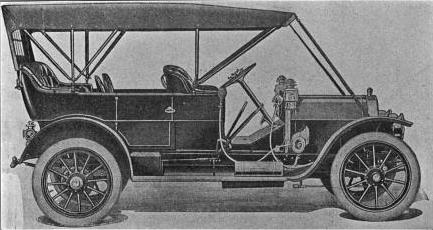
1910 Gaeth XXI Touring Car

The company for the 1910 model year would even admit that the Model XXI was the same car as before, and the reason given was that they had perfected their design to the point that it did not need to change. The price and specs were the same as the previous year.
