= Narayanganj-4 =

Constituency of Bangladesh's Jatiya Sangsad

Coordinates: 23.64°N 90.48°E

- Constituency for the Jatiya Sangsad
- District: Narayanganj District
- Division: Dhaka Division
- Electorate: 540,783 (2026)

Current constituency
- Created: 1984
- Party: National Citizen Party
- Member: Abdullah Al Amin
- ← 206 Narayanganj-3 208 Narayanganj-5 →

Narayanganj-4 is a constituency represented in the Jatiya Sangsad (National Parliament) of Bangladesh since 2026 by Abdullah Al Amin of the National Citizen Party.

== Boundaries ==
The constituency encompasses Narayanganj Sadar Upazila.

== History ==
The constituency was created in 1984 from the Dhaka-31 constituency when the former Dhaka District was split into six districts: Manikganj, Munshiganj, Dhaka, Gazipur, Narsingdi, and Narayanganj.

Ahead of the 2008 general election, the Election Commission redrew constituency boundaries to reflect population changes revealed by the 2001 Bangladesh census. The 2008 redistricting altered the boundaries of the constituency.

As of 2008, the constituency encompassed five union parishads of Narayanganj Sadar Upazila: Baktaboli, Enayetnagar, Fatullah, Kashipur, and Kutubpur.

In 2011, Narayanganj City Corporation was formed by amalgamating three municipalities. Siddhriganj Municipality, in the north, became wards 1-9 of the new city. Narayanganj Municipality, in the south, became wards 10-18. Kadam Rasul Municipality, on the opposite bank of the Shitalakshya River, became wards 19-27.

For the 2014 general election, the commission described the constituency in terms of thanas, saying it encompassed two of the four thanas that made up Bandar Upazila, Narayanganj Sadar Upazila, and Narayanganj City Corportation: Fatullah and Siddhirganj. Sigghirganj Municipality (Godnail, Siddhirganj, and Sumil Para union parishads) had previously been part of Narayanganj-3.

Ahead of the 2018 general election, the Election Commission expanded the boundaries of the constituency by adding ward 10 of Naryanganj City Coporation from Narayanganj-5. Narayanganj-4 then encompassed Narayanganj City Corporation wards 1-10 and all but two union parishads of Narayanganj Sadar Upazila: Alirtek and Gognagar.

In 2025, the Election Commission added Alirtek and Gognagar union parishads and removed Narayangang City Corportion, so that the constituency encompassed Narayanganj Sadar Upazila.

== Members of Parliament ==
Election	Member	Party
1986	M. A. Sattar	Jatiya Party
1991	Sirajul Islam	Bangladesh Nationalist Party
Feb 1996	Mohammad Ali	Bangladesh Nationalist Party
Jun 1996	Shamim Osman	Awami League
2001	Muhammad Gias Uddin	Bangladesh Nationalist Party
2008	Kabori Sarwar	Awami League
2014	Shamim Osman	Awami League
2018	Shamim Osman	Awami League
2024	Shamim Osman	Awami League
2026	Abdullah Al Amin	National Citizen Party

== Elections ==
=== Elections in the 2020s ===
General Election 2026: Narayanganj-4
Party	Candidate	Votes	%	±%
NCP	Abdullah Al Amin	106,171	40.9	N/A
JUI	Monir Hossain	80,619	31.1	N/A
Independent	Md. Shah Alam	31,589	12.2	N/A
IAB	Md. Ishmail Hossain Kausar	16,746	6.5	N/A
Bangladesh Republican Party	Muhammad Ali	11,328	4.4	N/A
Independent	Muhammad Ghiyas Uddin	9,779	3.8	N/A
JP(E)	Md. Salauddin Khoka	817	0.3	N/A
Bangladesh Khelafat Majlis	Anwar Hossain	800	0.3	N/A
BSP	Md. Selim Ahmed	643	0.2	N/A
CPB	Iqbal Hossain	479	0.2	N/A
BSD	Salim Mahmud	282	0.1	N/A
GOP	Md. Arif Bhuiyan	106	0.0	N/A
Majority		25,552	9.9	N/A
Turnout		259,359	48.0	N/A
Registered electors		540,783		
NCP gain from AL				

=== Elections in the 2010s ===
General Election 2018: Narayanganj-4
Party	Candidate	Votes	%	±%
AL	Shamim Osman	393,136	80.03	+31.53
BNP	Monir Hossain	76,582	15.59	−32.11
IAB	Mohammad Shafiqul Islam	21,524	4.38	+0.88
Majority		316,554	64.44	+63.64
Turnout		491,242	75.46	−4.14
Registered electors		651,099		
AL hold				

Shamim Osman was elected unopposed in the 2014 general election after opposition parties withdrew their candidacies in a boycott of the election.

=== Elections in the 2000s ===
General Election 2008: Narayanganj-4
Party	Candidate	Votes	%	±%
AL	Kabori Sarwar	141,075	48.5	+7.1
BNP	Shah Alam	138,686	47.7	−5.9
IAB	Mohammad Shafiqul Islam	10,200	3.5	N/A
BSD	Md. Ismail Mia	564	0.2	N/A
Gano Front	Mohammad Abdul Latif Majumder	147	0.1	N/A
Majority		2,389	0.8	−11.4
Turnout		290,672	79.6	+11.3
AL gain from BNP				

General Election 2001: Narayanganj-4
Party	Candidate	Votes	%	±%
BNP	Muhammad Gias Uddin	137,323	53.6	+19.8
AL	Shamim Osman	106,104	41.4	+2.6
IJOF	Md. Atiqur Rahman Nannu Munshi	10,494	4.1	N/A
Independent	Md. Nurul Amin Maksud	604	0.2	N/A
Independent	Md. Kamal Hossain	421	0.2	N/A
Bangladesh Samajtantrik Dal (Basad-Khalekuzzaman)	Mahbubur Rahman Ismail	343	0.1	N/A
BKA	Muhammad Abdul Mannan Dhali	275	0.1	N/A
Jatiya Party (M)	A. K. M. Mahbub Ullah	206	0.1	N/A
BIF	Md. Fayez Ahmmad	169	0.1	N/A
Independent	A. K. M. Fazlul Haq	104	0.0	N/A
Independent	Abu Hasnat Md. Shahid Badal	51	0.0	N/A
Majority		31,219	12.2	+7.2
Turnout		256,094	68.3	−3.0
BNP gain from AL				

=== Elections in the 1990s ===
General Election June 1996: Narayanganj-4
Party	Candidate	Votes	%	±%
AL	Shamim Osman	73,349	38.8	+15.8
BNP	Sirajul Islam	63,866	33.8	−6.5
JP(E)	Sattar Ali Bhuiyan	38,653	20.4	+8.7
IOJ	Md. Nannu Munshi	4,588	2.4	−0.9
Jamaat	Md. Nurul Islam	3,862	2.0	N/A
Zaker Party	Suruzzaman	2,992	1.6	−2.1
NAP	Mahtab Uddin	640	0.3	N/A
Jatiya Samajtantrik Dal (Mohiuddin)	Mahiuddin Ahmed	393	0.2	N/A
Independent	Md. Taslim Hossain	378	0.2	N/A
Bangladesh Samajtantrik Dal (Khalekuzzaman)	Mahabubur Rahman	218	0.1	N/A
Independent	Masudul Islam Khokan	111	0.1	N/A
Jatiya Samajtantrik Dal-JSD	Mosa Fatema Begum	62	0.0	N/A
Jatiya Janata Party (Asad)	Alamgir Hossain	50	0.0	N/A
Majority		9,483	5.0	−12.3
Turnout		189,162	71.3	+18.9
AL gain from BNP				

General Election 1991: Narayanganj-4
Party	Candidate	Votes	%	±%
BNP	Sirajul Islam	54,578	40.3	
AL	Ashraf Uddin Ahmmed Chunnu	31,121	23.0	
Independent	Mohammad Ali	22,001	16.3	
JP(E)	M. A. Sattar	15,859	11.7	
Zaker Party	Suruzzaman	4,981	3.7	
IOJ	Shahidul Islam	4,516	3.3	
FP	Kamal Ahmad	986	0.7	
Bangladesh Freedom League	Babul Prodhan	432	0.3	
Dhumpan O MAdokdrobba Nibaronkari Manabsheba Schansta	Md. Mosleh Udiin	430	0.3	
Jatiya Janata Party and Gonotantrik Oikkya Jot	Roushan Ara Begum	232	0.2	
JSD (S)	Fatema Begum	206	0.2	
Majority		23,457	17.3	
Turnout		135,342	52.4	
BNP gain from JP(E)				
