= Sirajul Islam (Narayanganj politician) =

Bangladesh Nationalist Party politician

- সিরাজুল ইসলাম

Member of Parliament from Narayanganj-4
- In office 1991 – February 1996
- Preceded by: M. A. Sattar
- Succeeded by: Muhammad Ali

Personal details
- Died: 23 March 2012; Narayanganj district
- Political party: Bangladesh Nationalist Party

Sirajul Islam was a Bangladesh Nationalist Party politician and freedom fighter. He was elected a member of parliament in 1991.

== Birth and early life ==
Sirajul Islam was born in Narayanganj district.

== Career ==
Sirajul Islam was elected a member of parliament in 1991 from Narayanganj-4.

== Death ==
Sirajul Islam died on 23 March 2012.
