= Muhammad Gias Uddin =

Bangladeshi politician

Member of Parliament
- In office 2001–2005

Personal details
- Born: 10 May 1952; Siddhirganj, Narayangonj
- Political party: Bangladesh Nationalist Party
- Website: gimc.edu.bd

Muhammad Gias Uddin is a Bangladesh Nationalist Party politician and a former Member of Parliament from Narayanganj-4 and founder of Gias Uddin Islamic Model College

== Early life ==
He joined the student body in 1966 as an ordinary member of the then East Pakistan Chhatra League while studying in class eight at Godnail High School. He worked in various organizational positions in student organizations and political parties at the police station, district, and national levels.

== Political career ==
Uddin was elected to parliament from Narayanganj-4 in 2001 as a Bangladesh Nationalist Party. He and his two wives, and son were sued by the Bangladesh Anti-Corruption Commission for amassing 200 million takas beyond his known source of income and underreporting his wealth. He took over extortion activities in a territory of Nur Hossain after Hossain was arrested in the Seven Murders of the Narayanganj case.
