= Nasim Osman =

Bangladeshi politician

- নাসিম ওসমান

Member of Parliament
- In office 1986–1990
- Succeeded by: Abul Kalam
- Constituency: Narayanganj-5
- In office 2008–2014
- Preceded by: Abul Kalam
- Succeeded by: Salim Osman
- Constituency: Narayanganj-5

Personal details
- Born: 31 July 1953
- Died: 30 April 2014 (aged 60) Dehradun, Uttarakhand, India
- Party: Jatiya Party (Ershad)
- Relations: Osman family
- Parent: AKM Samsuzzoha (father)

Nasim Osman (31 July 1953 – 30 April 2014) was a Jatiya Party (Ershad) politician and the Member of Parliament from Narayanganj.

== Career ==
Osman was elected to the parliament of Jatiya Sangsad four times, in 1986, 1988, 2008, and 2014.

== Personal life ==
Osman's father, AKM Samsuzzoha, was a member of parliament and his youngest brother Shamim Osman is member of parliament from Bangladesh Awami League. Osman died 30 April 2014. After his death, his younger brother, Salim Osman was elected from the same constituency.

Osman was married to Parvin Osman. Together they had a son Azmery Osman, two daughters Irin Osman and Afrin Osman.
