= Bengal =

Region in the eastern Indian subcontinent

Bengal: বঙ্গ Bôṅgô; বাংলা Bāṅlā
- Region
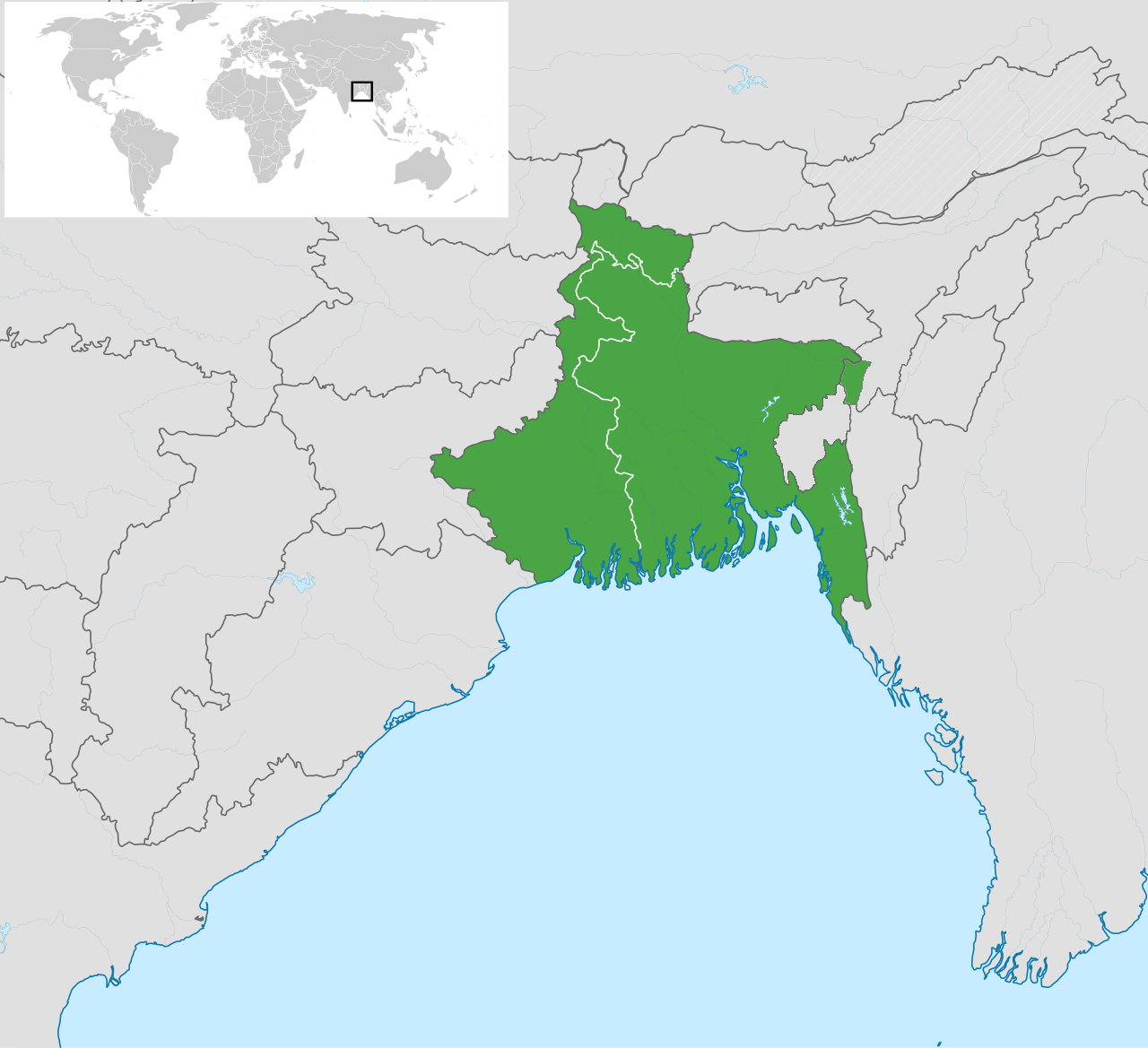
- Map of Bengal
- Continent: Asia
- Countries: Bangladesh; India (West Bengal, Karimganj district of Assam)
- Iron Age India, Vedic India, Suhma kingdom, Pundravardhana, Vanga kingdom: 1500 – c. 500 BCE
- Gangaridai, Nanda Empire: 500 – c. 350 BCE
- Mauryan Empire: 4th century – 2nd century BCE
- Shunga Empire, Gupta Empire, Later Gupta dynasty: 185–75 BCE, 3rd century CE – 543 CE, 6th–7th century
- Gauda Kingdom: 590–633 CE
- Pala Empire, Sena Empire, Deva Empire: 8th–11th century, 11th–12th century, 12th–13th century
- Delhi Sultanate, Bengal Sultanate: 1204–1339 CE, 1338–1576 CE
- Bengal Subah (Mughal Empire), Nawabs of Bengal: 1565–1717 CE, 1717–1765 CE
- Bengal Presidency (British India): 1765–1947 CE
- Divisions: List: (India) Barak Valley; (Bangladesh) Barisal; (India) Burdwan; (Bangladesh) Chittagong; (Bangladesh) Dhaka; (India) Jalpaiguri; (Bangladesh) Khulna; (India) Malda; (India) Medinipur; (Bangladesh) Mymensingh; (India) Presidency; (Bangladesh) Rajshahi; (Bangladesh) Rangpur; (Bangladesh) Sylhet

Area
  - Total: 239,021 km^{2} (92,287 sq mi)

Population (2022)
  - Total: ▲273,610,384
  - Density: 1,144/km^{2} (2,960/sq mi)
- Religion: ~70% Islam; ~29% Hinduism; <1% Buddhism; <1% Christianity; <1% Others
- Demonym(s): Bengali
- Time zone: UTC+5:30, UTC+6:00
- Internet TLD: .bd, .in (English).বাংলা, .ভারত (Bengali)
- Largest urban areas: List: (Bangladesh) Dhaka; (India) Kolkata; (Bangladesh) Chittagong; (Bangladesh) Gazipur

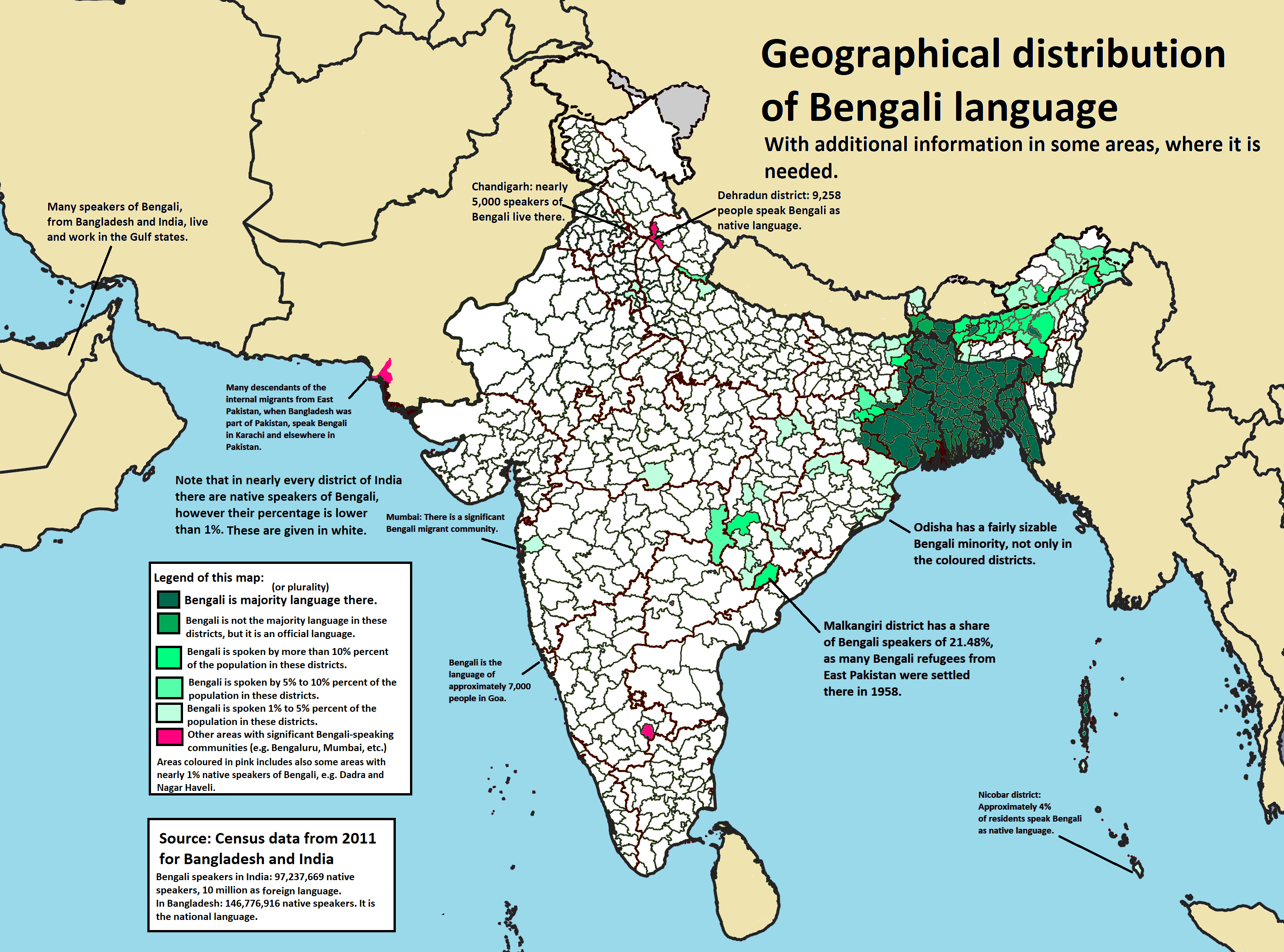
Geographical distribution of the Bengali language.

Bengal (/bɛnˈɡɔːl/ ben-GAWL) (Note: Bengali: বঙ্গ, romanized: Bôṅgô, pronounced [ˈbɔŋɡo] or Bengali: বাংলা, romanized: Bāṅlā, pronounced [ˈbaŋla]) is a geographical, ethnolinguistic, historically geopolitical region in South Asia north of the Bay of Bengal. It is politically divided between the sovereign state of Bangladesh, the Indian state of West Bengal, and Karimganj district in the Indian state of Assam.

The ancient Vanga Kingdom is widely regarded as the namesake of the Bengal region. The Bengali calendar dates to the reign of Shashanka in the 7th century CE. The Pala Empire was founded in Bengal during the 8th century. The Sena dynasty and Deva dynasty ruled between the 11th and 13th centuries. By the 14th century, Bengal was absorbed by Muslim conquests in the Indian subcontinent. An independent Bengal Sultanate was formed and became the eastern frontier of the Islamic world. During this period, Bengal's rule and influence spread to Assam, Arakan, Tripura, Bihar, and Odisha (formerly Orissa). Bengal Subah later emerged as a prosperous part of the Mughal Empire.

The last independent Nawab of Bengal was defeated in 1757 by the East India Company at the Battle of Plassey. The company's Bengal Presidency grew into the largest administrative unit of British India, with Calcutta as the capital of both Bengal and India until 1911. As a result of the first partition of Bengal, a short-lived province called Eastern Bengal and Assam existed between 1905 and 1911, with its capital in the former Mughal capital Dhaka. After the Sylhet referendum and votes by the Bengal Legislative Council and Bengal Legislative Assembly, the region was again divided along religious lines in 1947.

Bengali culture, particularly its literature, music, art and cinema, are well known in South Asia and beyond. The region is also notable for its economic and social scientists, including several Nobel laureates. Once home to the city with the highest per capita income level in British India, the region is today a leader in South Asia in terms of gender parity, the gender pay gap, and other indices of human development.

== Etymology ==
The name Bengal derives from the ancient kingdom of Vanga (pronounced Bôngô), the earliest records of which date to the Mahabharata epic in the first millennium BCE. An inscription issued in 409 CE from present-day Comilla by Maheshwar Nāthachandra, king of ancient Bengal's Samatata region, for the purpose of constructing a temple of Lord Manibhadra, mentions landlords whose names had the suffix "Vangāla" donating land for the temple's construction. It also provides evidence of the presence of local Vangāla people. The land of Vaṅga later came to be known as Vaṅgāla (Bāṅgālā). One of the earliest references to it is in the Comilla copperplates (720 CE) of Buddhist Deva King Ananda Deva, where he is called Sri Vaṅgāla Mrīgānka, meaning the moon of Bengal. Another early reference to 'Vangalam' is in an inscription in the Brihadisvara Temple at Thanjavur. The term Vangaladesa is used to describe the region in 11th-century South Indian records. In the 12th-century Sanskrit text Manasollasa, the name Gaudabangala is used to denote the whole Bengal region. The modern term Bangla became prominent from the 14th century, which saw the establishment of the Sultanate of Bengal, whose first ruler, Shamsuddin Ilyas Shah, was known as the Shah of Bangala. Arab geographers Ahmad ibn Majid and Sulaiman Al Mahri also call the region Bangala' and the 'land of Bang'. The Portuguese called the region Bengala in the Age of Discovery.

== History ==
=== Antiquity ===
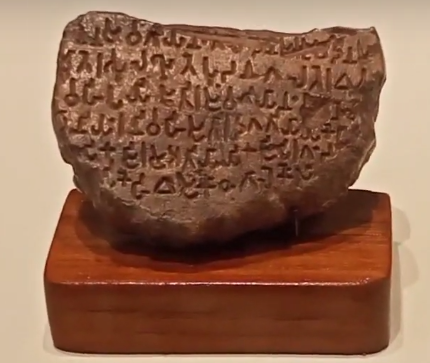
Mahasthan Brahmi Inscription, the earliest text on governance in the Bengal region

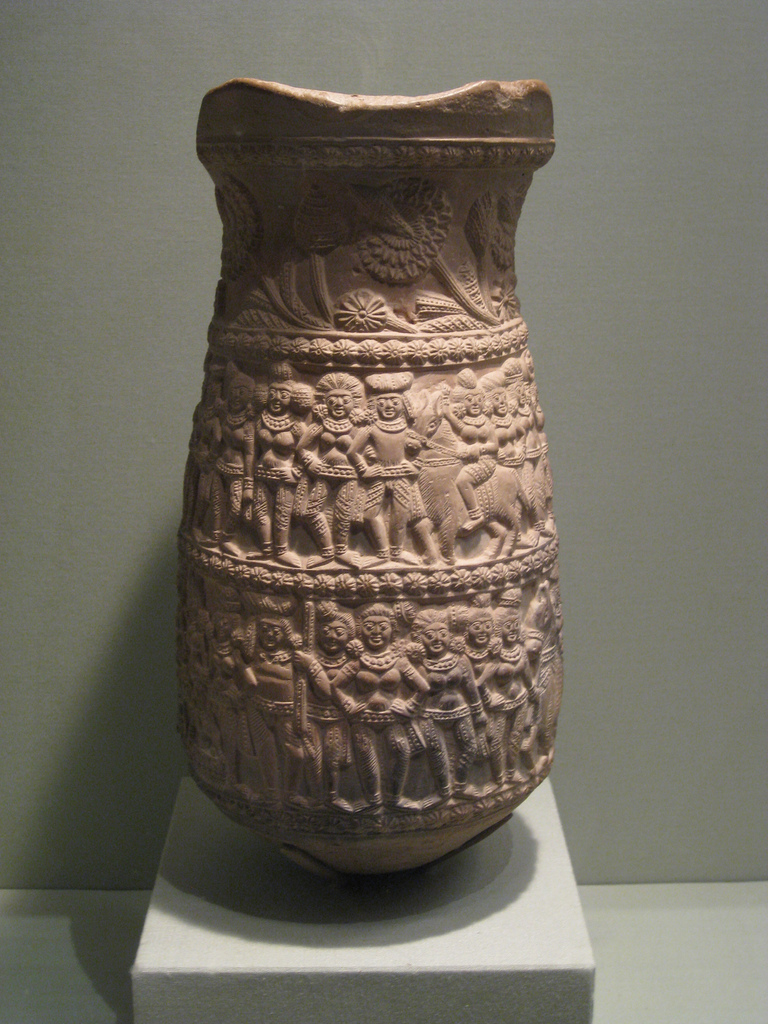
Pottery with processional scenes from the Chandraketugarh region of West Bengal, India, c. 100 BC

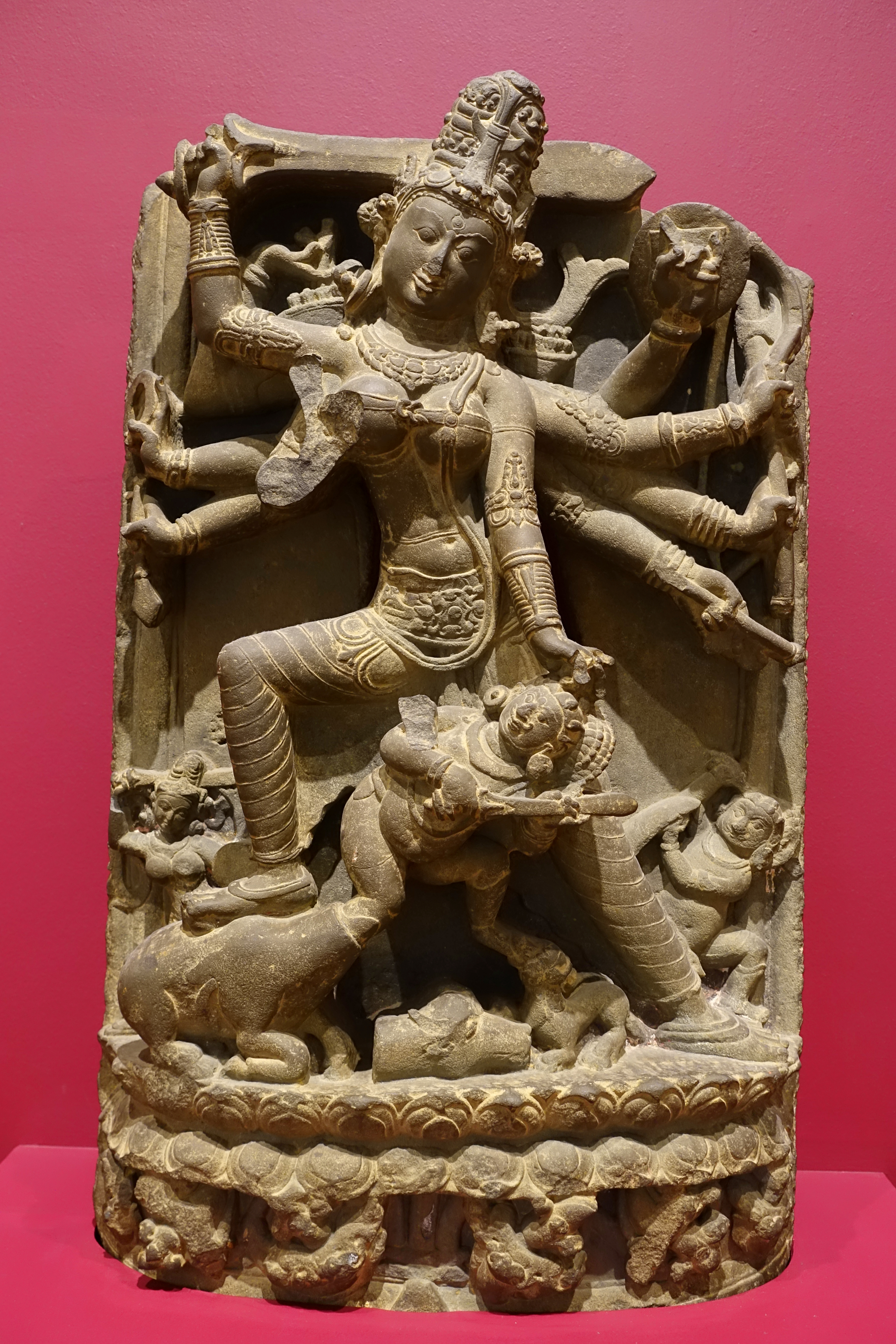
Goddess Durga, Pala period, 10th century

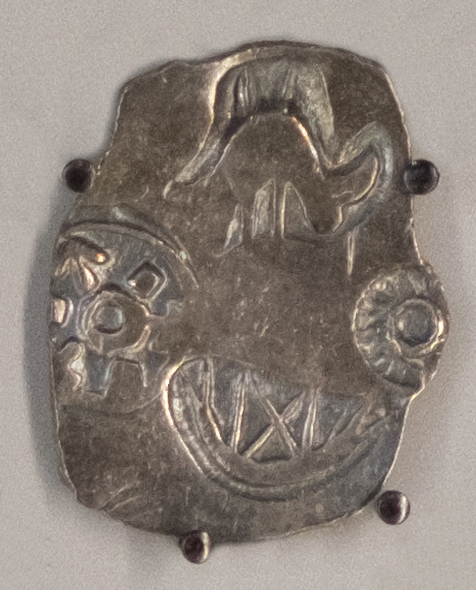
Coinage of Vanga Kingdom, 400–300 BCE

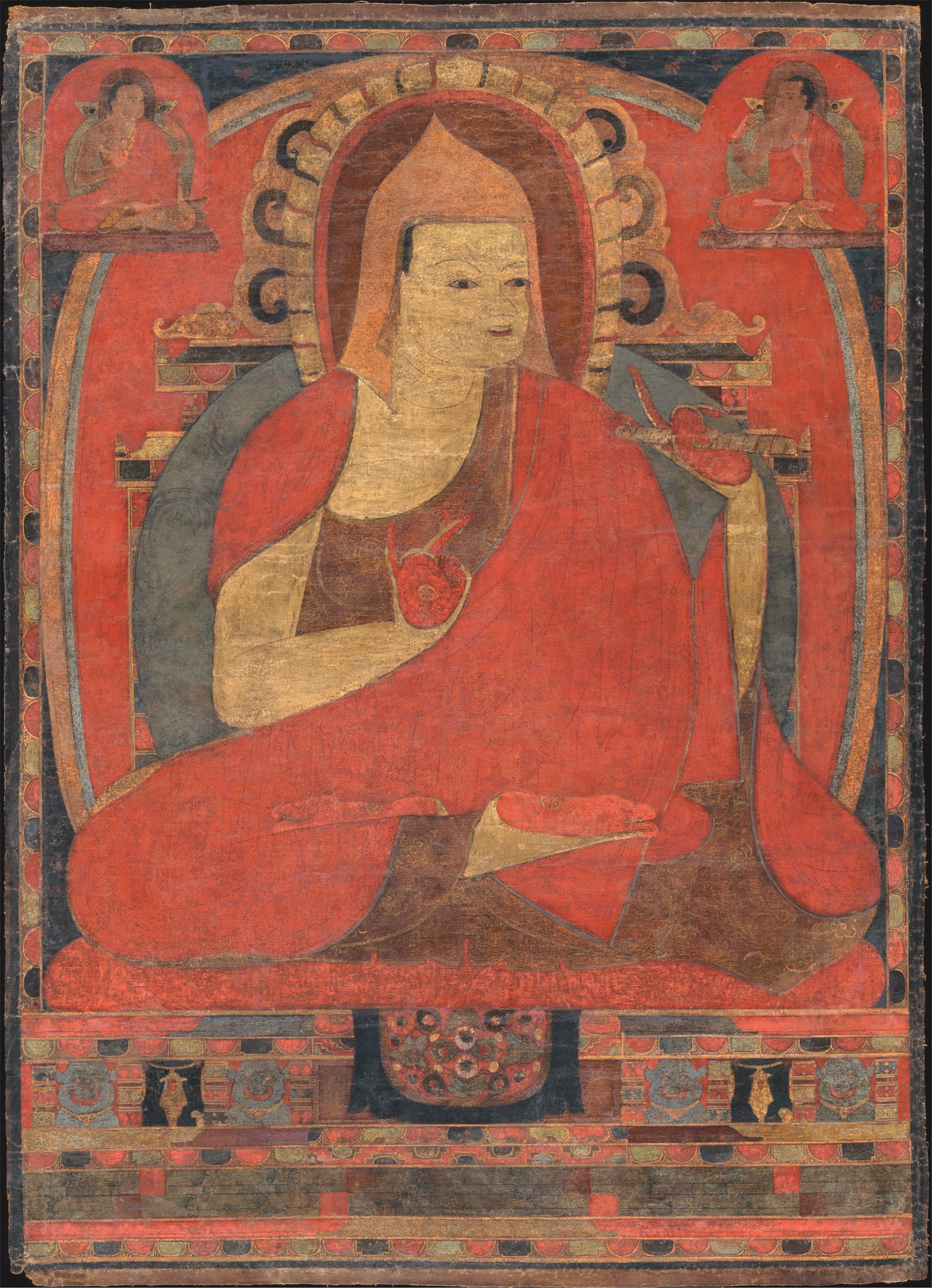
Atisa of Bikrampur

Neolithic sites have been found in several parts of the region. In the second millennium BCE, rice-cultivating communities dotted the region. By the eleventh century BCE, people in Bengal lived in systematically aligned homes, produced copper objects, and crafted black and red pottery. Remnants of Copper Age settlements are located in the region. At the advent of the Iron Age, people in Bengal adopted iron-based weapons, tools and irrigation equipment. From 600 BCE, the second wave of urbanisation engulfed the northern South Asia as part of the Northern Black Polished Ware culture. Ancient archaeological sites and cities in Dihar, Pandu Rajar Dhibi, Mahasthangarh, Chandraketugarh and Wari-Bateshwar emerged. The Ganges, Brahmaputra and Meghna rivers were natural arteries for communication and transportation. Estuaries on the Bay of Bengal allowed for maritime trade with distant lands in Southeast Asia and elsewhere.

The ancient geopolitical divisions of Bengal included Varendra, Suhma, Anga, Vanga, Samatata and Harikela. These regions were often independent or under the rule of larger empires. The Mahasthan Brahmi Inscription indicates that Bengal was ruled by the Mauryan Empire in the 3rd century BCE. The inscription was an administrative order instructing relief for a distressed segment of the population. Punch-marked coins found in the region indicate that coins were used as currency during the Iron Age. The namesake of Bengal is the ancient Vanga Kingdom which was reputed as a naval power with overseas colonies. A prince from Bengal named Vijaya founded the first kingdom in Sri Lanka. The two most prominent pan-Indian empires of this period included the Mauryans and the Gupta Empire. The region was a centre of artistic, political, social, spiritual and scientific thinking, including the invention of chess, Indian numerals, and the concept of zero.

The region was known to the ancient Greeks and Romans as Gangaridai. The Greek ambassador Megasthenes chronicled its military strength and dominance of the Ganges delta. The invasion army of Alexander the Great was deterred by the accounts of Gangaridai's power in 325 BCE, including a cavalry of war elephants. Later Roman accounts noted maritime trade routes with Bengal. 1st century Roman coins with images of Hercules were found in the region and point to trade links with Roman Egypt through the Red Sea. The Wari-Bateshwar ruins are believed to be the emporium (trading centre) of Sounagoura mentioned by Roman geographer Claudius Ptolemy. A Roman amphora was found in Purba Medinipur district of West Bengal which was made in Aelana (present-day Aqaba, Jordan) between the 4th and 7th centuries AD.

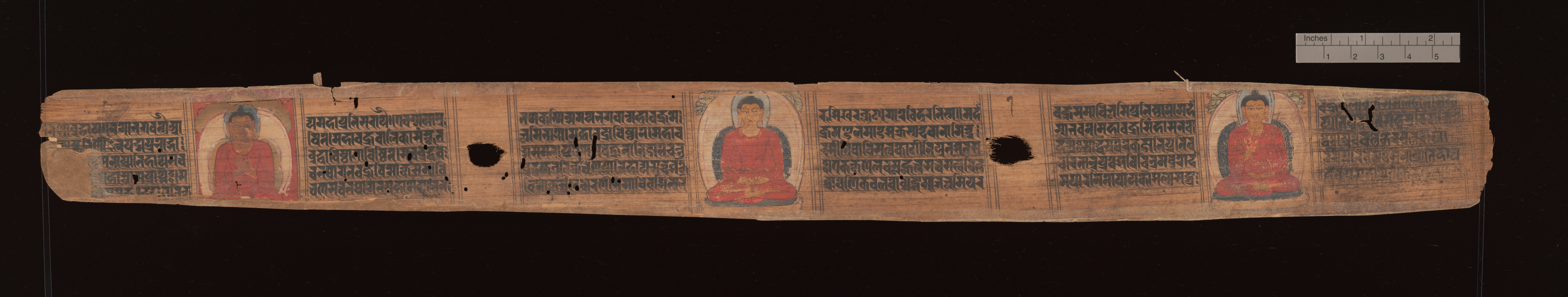
Buddhist palm leaf manuscript, 10th century CE

The first unified Bengali polity can be traced to the reign of Shashanka. The origins of the Bengali calendar can be traced to his reign. Shashanka founded the Gauda Kingdom. After Shashanka's death, Bengal experienced a period of civil war known as Matsyanyayam. The ancient city of Gauda later gave birth to the Pala Empire. The first Pala emperor Gopala I was chosen by an assembly of chieftains in Gauda. The Pala kingdom grew into one of the largest empires in South Asia. The Pala period saw advances in linguistics, sculpture, painting, and education. The empire achieved its greatest territorial extent under Dharmapala and Devapala. The Palas vied for control of Kannauj with the rival Gurjara-Pratihara and Rashtrakuta dynasties. Pala influence also extended to Tibet and Sumatra due to the travels and preachings of Atisa. The university of Nalanda was established by the Palas. They also built the Somapura Mahavihara, which was the largest monastic institution in the subcontinent. The rule of the Palas eventually disintegrated. The Chandra dynasty ruled southeastern Bengal and Arakan. The Varman dynasty ruled parts of northeastern Bengal and Assam. The Sena dynasty emerged as the main successor of the Palas by the 11th century. The Senas were a resurgent Hindu dynasty which ruled much of Bengal. The smaller Deva dynasty also ruled parts of the region. Ancient Chinese visitors like Xuanzang provided elaborate accounts of Bengal's cities and monastic institutions.

Muslim trade with Bengal flourished after the fall of the Sasanian Empire and the Arab takeover of Persian trade routes. Much of this trade occurred with southeastern Bengal in areas east of the Meghna River. Bengal was probably used as a transit route to China by the earliest Muslims. Abbasid coins have been discovered in the archaeological ruins of Paharpur and Mainamati. A collection of Sasanian, Umayyad and Abbasid coins are preserved in the Bangladesh National Museum.

=== Sultanate period ===
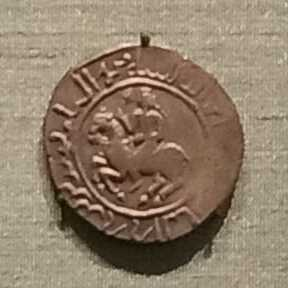
Coin featuring a horseman issued by the Delhi Sultanate celebrating the Muslim conquest of Lakhnauti

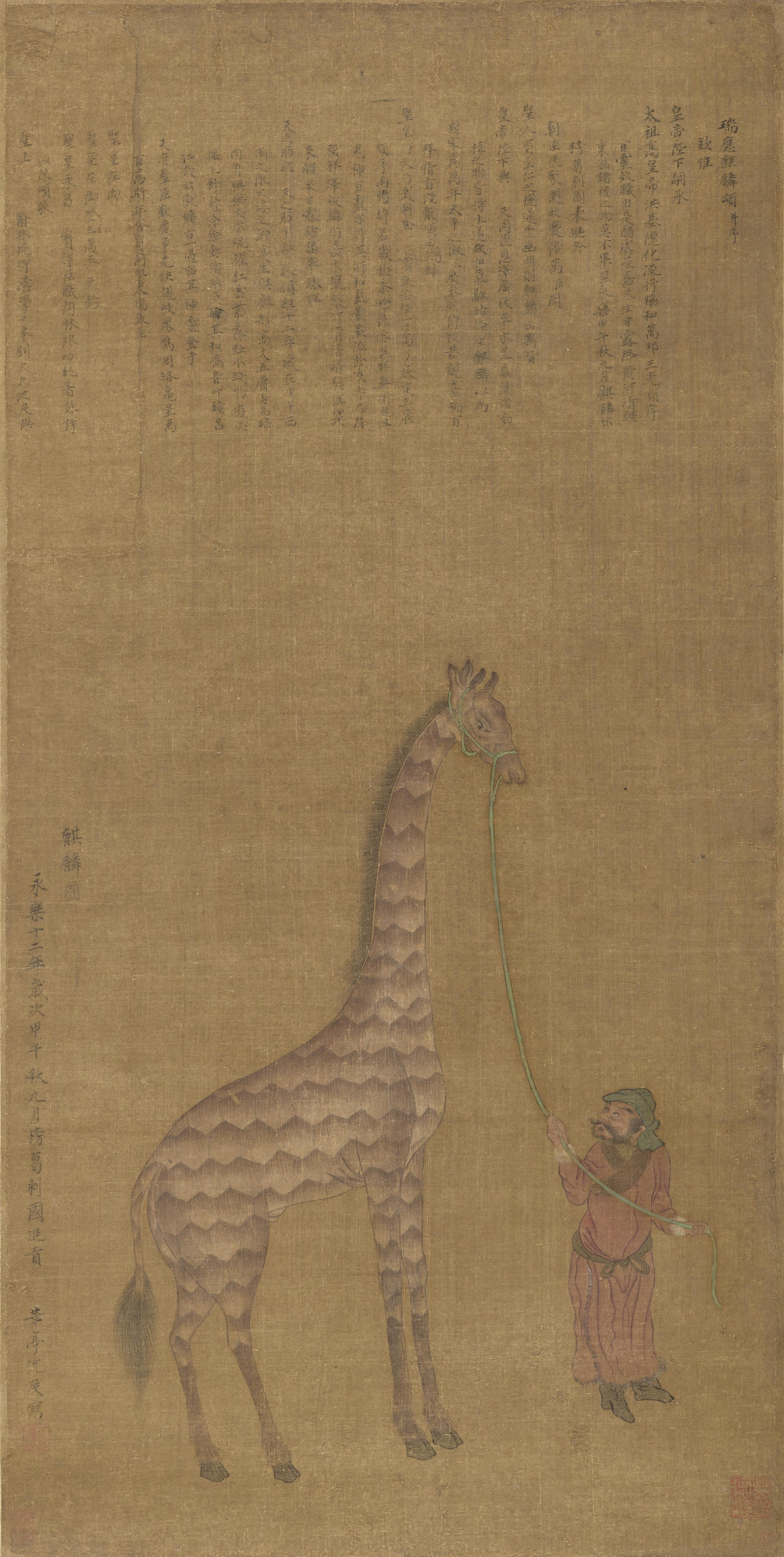
Chinese manuscript showing an African giraffe gifted to China by the Sultan of Bengal in 1414

In 1204, the Ghurid general Muhammad bin Bakhtiyar Khalji began the Islamic conquest of Bengal. The fall of Lakhnauti was recounted by historians circa 1243. Lakhnauti was the capital of the Sena dynasty. According to historical accounts, Ghurid cavalry swept across the Gangetic plains towards Bengal. They entered the Bengali capital disguised as horse traders. Once inside the royal compound, Bakhtiyar and his horsemen swiftly overpowered the guards of the Sena king who had just sat down to eat a meal. The king then hastily fled to the forest with his followers. The overthrow of the Sena king has been described as a coup d'état, which "inaugurated an era, lasting over five centuries, during which most of Bengal was dominated by rulers professing the Islamic faith. In itself this was not exceptional, since from about this time until the eighteenth century, Muslim sovereigns ruled over most of South Asia. What was exceptional, however, was that among India's interior provinces only in Bengal—a region approximately the size of England and Scotland combined—did a majority of the indigenous population adopt the religion of the ruling class, Islam". Bengal became a province of the Delhi Sultanate. A coin featuring a horseman was issued to celebrate the Muslim conquest of Lakhnauti with inscriptions in Sanskrit and Arabic. An abortive Islamic invasion of Tibet was also mounted by Bakhtiyar. Bengal was under the formal rule of the Delhi Sultanate for approximately 150 years. Delhi struggled to consolidate control over Bengal. Rebel governors often sought to assert autonomy or independence. Sultan Iltutmish re-established control over Bengal in 1225 after suppressing the rebels. Due to the considerable overland distance, Delhi's authority in Bengal was relatively weak. It was left to local governors to expand territory and bring new areas under Muslim rule, such as through the Conquest of Sylhet in 1303.

In 1338, new rebellions sprung up in Bengal's three main towns. Governors in Lakhnauti, Satgaon and Sonargaon declared independence from Delhi. This allowed the ruler of Sonargaon, Fakhruddin Mubarak Shah, to annexe Chittagong to the Islamic administration. By 1352, the ruler of Satgaon, Shamsuddin Ilyas Shah, unified the region into an independent state. Ilyas Shah established his capital in Pandua. The new breakaway state emerged as the Bengal Sultanate, which developed into a territorial, mercantile and maritime empire. At the time, the Islamic world stretched from Muslim Spain in the west to Bengal in the east.

The initial raids of Ilyas Shah saw the first Muslim army enter Nepal and stretched from Varanasi in the west to Orissa in the south to Assam in the east. The Delhi army continued to fend off the new Bengali army. The Bengal-Delhi War ended in 1359 when Delhi recognised the independence of Bengal. Ilyas Shah's son Sikandar Shah defeated Delhi Sultan Firuz Shah Tughluq during the Siege of Ekdala Fort. A subsequent peace treaty recognised Bengal's independence and Sikandar Shah was gifted a golden crown by the Sultan of Delhi. The ruler of Arakan sought refuge in Bengal during the reign of Ghiyasuddin Azam Shah. Jalaluddin Muhammad Shah later helped the Arakanese king to regain control of his throne in exchange for becoming a tributary state of the Bengal Sultanate. Bengali influence in Arakan persisted for 300 years. Bengal also helped the king of Tripura to regain control of his throne in exchange for becoming a tributary state. The ruler of the Jaunpur Sultanate also sought refuge in Bengal. The vassal states of Bengal included Arakan, Tripura, Chandradwip and Pratapgarh. At its peak, the Bengal Sultanate's territory included parts of Arakan, Assam, Bihar, Orissa, and Tripura. The Bengal Sultanate experienced its greatest military success under Alauddin Hussain Shah, who was proclaimed as the conqueror of Assam after his forces led by Shah Ismail Ghazi overthrew the Khen dynasty and annexed large parts of Assam. In maritime trade, the Bengal Sultanate benefited from Indian Ocean trade networks and emerged as a hub of re-exports. A giraffe was brought by African envoys from Malindi to Bengal's court and was later gifted to Imperial China. Ship-owing merchants acted as envoys of the Sultan while travelling to different regions in Asia and Africa. Many rich Bengali merchants lived in Malacca. Bengali ships transported embassies from Brunei, Aceh and Malacca to China. Bengal and the Maldives had a vast trade in shell currency. The Sultan of Bengal donated funds to build schools in the Hejaz region of Arabia.

The five dynastic periods of the Bengal Sultanate spanned from the Ilyas Shahi dynasty, to a period of rule by Bengali converts, to the Hussain Shahi dynasty, to a period of rule by Abyssinian usurpers; an interruption by the Suri dynasty; and ended with the Karrani dynasty. The Battle of Raj Mahal and the capture of Daud Khan Karrani marked the end of the Bengal Sultanate during the reign of Mughal Emperor Akbar. In the late 16th century, a confederation called the Baro-Bhuyan resisted Mughal invasions in eastern Bengal. The Baro-Bhuyan included twelve Muslim and Hindu leaders of the Zamindars of Bengal. They were led by Isa Khan, a former prime minister of the Bengal Sultanate. By the 17th century, the Mughals were able to fully absorb the region to their empire.

=== Mughal period ===
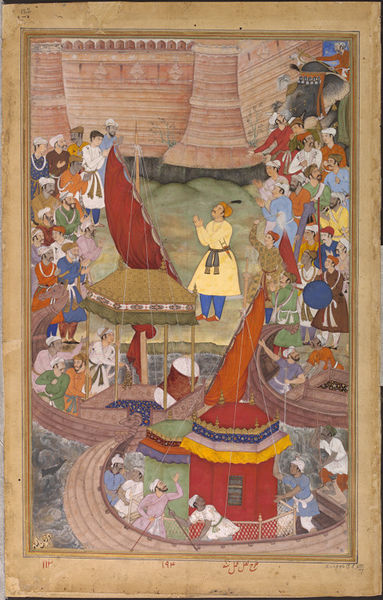
Mughal painting showing Emperor Akbar offering prayers after the conquest of Bengal

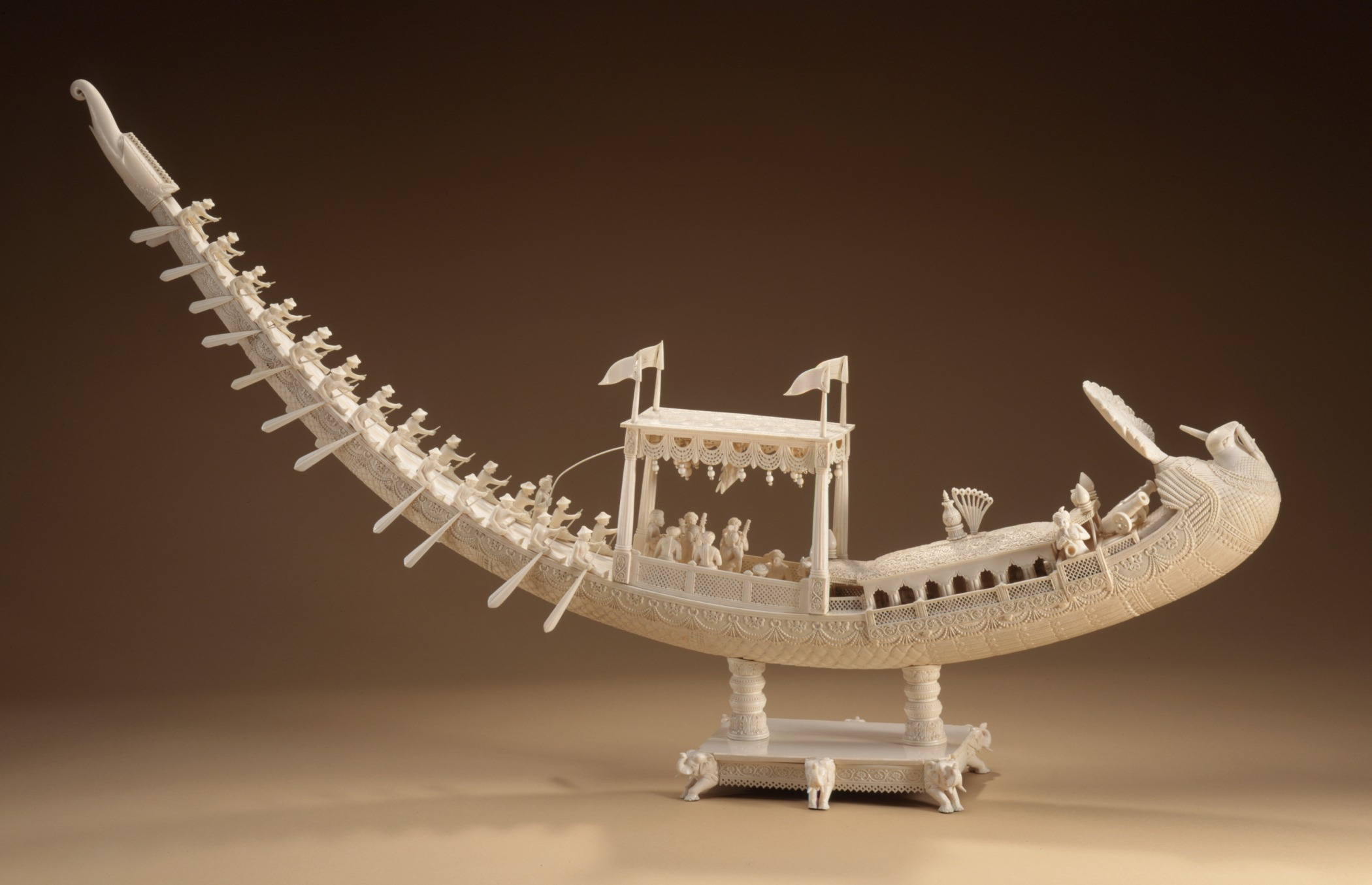
Art of Murshidabad. An ivory elephant tusk crafted into a model of the Royal Peacock Barge of the Nawab of Bengal.

Mughal Bengal had the richest elite and was the wealthiest region in the subcontinent. Bengal's trade and wealth impressed the Mughals so much that it was described as the Paradise of the Nations by the Mughal Emperors. A new provincial capital was built in Dhaka. Members of the imperial family were appointed to positions in Mughal Bengal, including the position of governor (subedar). Dhaka became a centre of palace intrigue and politics. Some of the most prominent governors included Rajput general Man Singh I, Emperor Shah Jahan's son Prince Shah Shuja, Emperor Aurangzeb's son and later Mughal emperor Azam Shah, and the influential aristocrat Shaista Khan. During the tenure of Shaista Khan, the Portuguese and Arakanese were expelled from the port of Chittagong in 1666. Bengal became the eastern frontier of the Mughal administration. By the 18th century, Bengal became home to a semi-independent aristocracy led by the Nawabs of Bengal. Bengal premier Murshid Quli Khan managed to curtail the influence of the governor due to his rivalry with Prince Azam Shah. Khan controlled Bengal's finances since he was in charge of the treasury. He shifted the provincial capital from Dhaka to Murshidabad.

In 1717, the Mughal court in Delhi recognised the hereditary monarchy of the Nawab of Bengal. The ruler was officially titled as the "Nawab of Bengal, Bihar and Orissa", as the Nawab ruled over the three regions in the eastern subcontinent. The Nawabs began issuing their own coins but continued to pledge nominal allegiance to the Mughal emperor. The wealth of Bengal was vital for the Mughal court because Delhi received its biggest share of revenue from the Nawab's court. The Nawabs presided over a period of unprecedented economic growth and prosperity, including an era of growing organisation in textiles, banking, a military-industrial complex, the production of fine quality handicrafts, and other trades. A process of proto-industrialisation was underway. Under the Nawabs, the streets of Bengali cities were filled with brokers, workers, peons, naibs, wakils, and ordinary traders. The Nawab's state was a major exporter of Bengal muslin, silk, gunpowder and saltpetre. The Nawabs also permitted European trading companies to operate in Bengal, including the British East India Company, the French East India Company, the Danish East India Company, the Austrian East India Company, the Ostend Company, and the Dutch East India Company. The Nawabs were also suspicious of the growing influence of these companies.

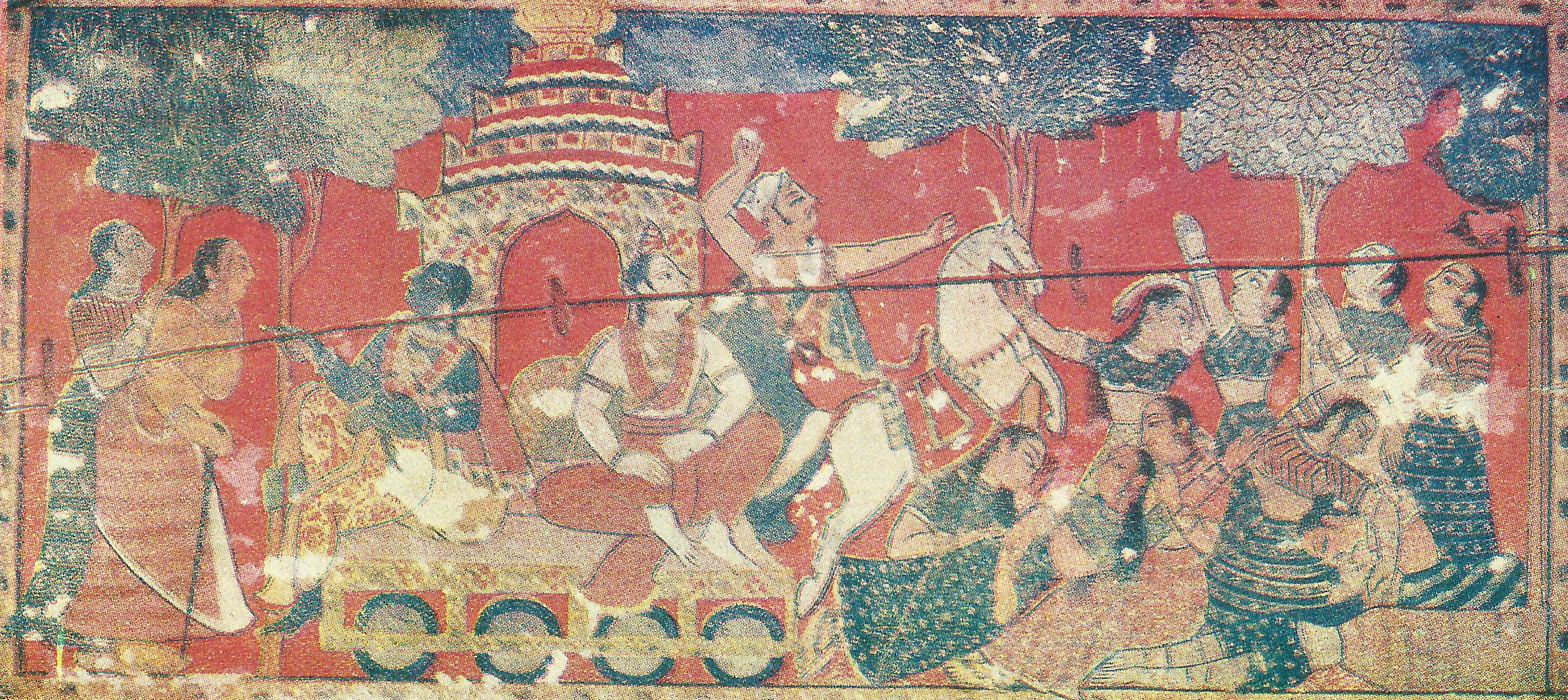
Bengali manuscript painting, 17th century

Under Mughal rule, Bengal was a centre of the worldwide muslin and silk trades. During the Mughal era, the most important centre of cotton production was Bengal, particularly around its capital city of Dhaka, leading to muslin being called "daka" in distant markets such as Central Asia. Domestically, much of India depended on Bengali products such as rice, silks and cotton textiles. Overseas, Europeans depended on Bengali products such as cotton textiles, silks and opium; Bengal accounted for 40% of Dutch imports from Asia, for example, including more than 50% of textiles and around 80% of silks. From Bengal, saltpetre was also shipped to Europe, opium was sold in Indonesia, raw silk was exported to Japan and the Netherlands, cotton and silk textiles were exported to Europe, Indonesia, and Japan, cotton cloth was exported to the Americas and the Indian Ocean. Bengal also had a large shipbuilding industry. In terms of shipbuilding tonnage during the 16th–18th centuries, economic historian Indrajit Ray estimates the annual output of Bengal at 223,250 tons, compared with 23,061 tons produced in nineteen colonies in North America from 1769 to 1771.

Since the 16th century, European traders traversed the sea routes to Bengal, following the Portuguese conquests of Malacca and Goa. The Portuguese established a settlement in Chittagong with permission from the Bengal Sultanate in 1528 but were later expelled by the Mughals in 1666. In the 18th century, the Mughal Court rapidly disintegrated due to Nader Shah's invasion and internal rebellions, allowing European colonial powers to set up trading posts across the territory. The British East India Company eventually emerged as the foremost military power in the region; and defeated the last independent Nawab of Bengal at the Battle of Plassey in 1757.

=== Colonial era (1757–1947) ===
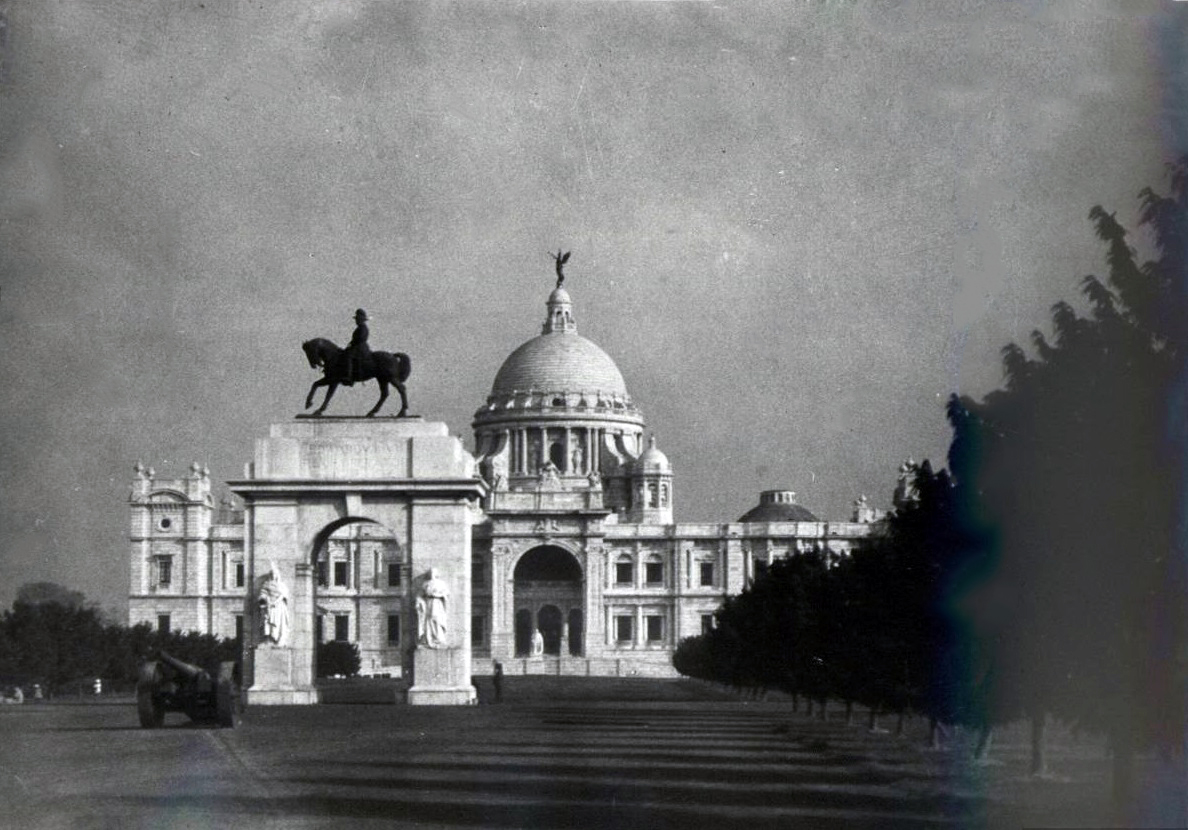
Victoria Memorial in Calcutta

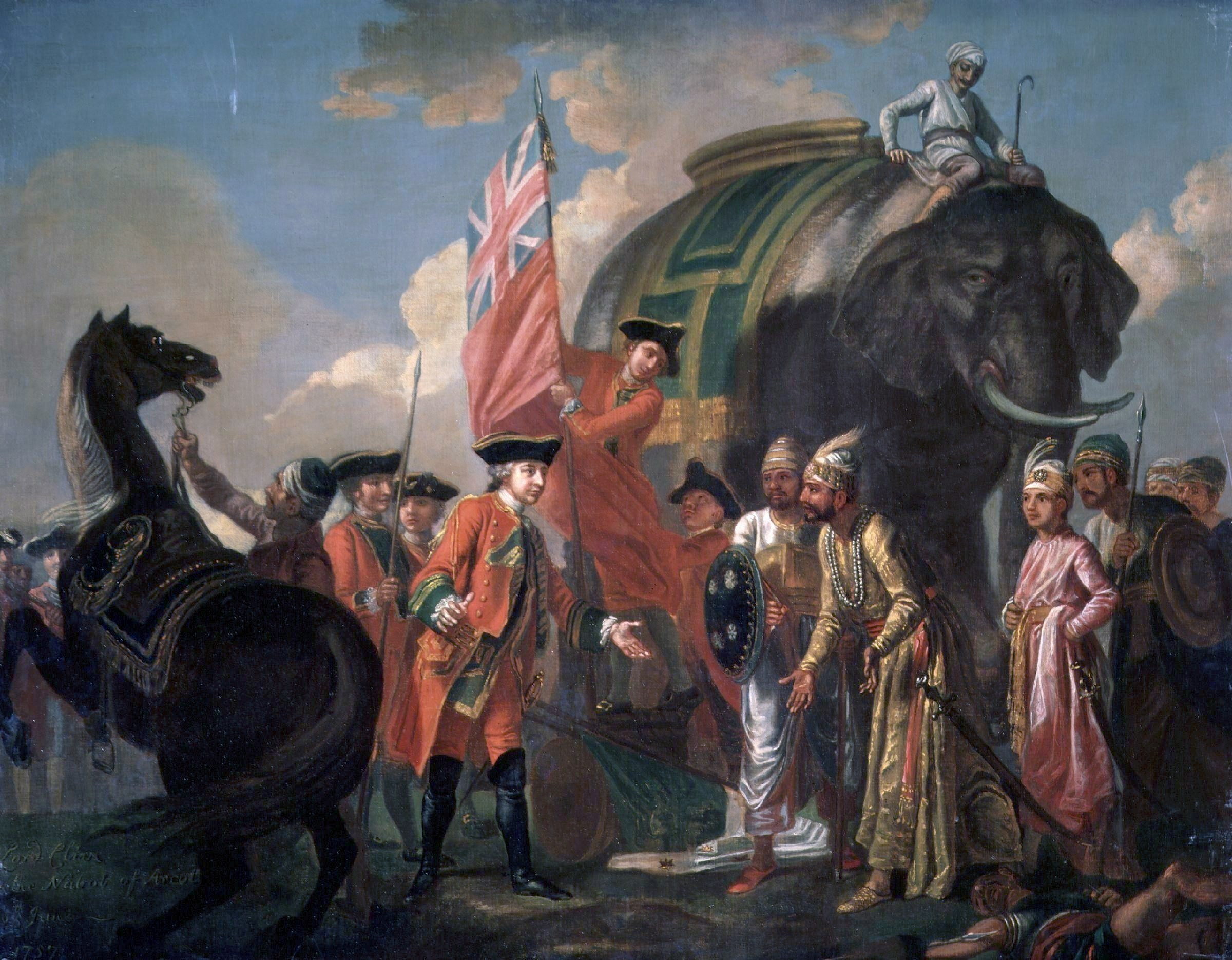
The Battle of Plassey in 1757 ushered in British rule.

The British East India Company began influencing and controlling the Nawab of Bengal from 1757 after the Battle of Plassey, thus signalling the start of British influence in India. British control of Bengal increased between 1757 and 1793 while the Nawab was reduced to a puppet figure. with the Presidency of Fort William asserting greater control over the entire province of Bengal and neighbouring territories. Calcutta was named the capital of British territories in India in 1772. The presidency was run by a military-civil administration, including the Bengal Army, and had the world's sixth earliest railway network. Between 1833 and 1854, the Governor of Bengal was concurrently the Governor-General of India for many years. Great Bengal famines struck several times during colonial rule (notably the Great Bengal famine of 1770 and Bengal famine of 1943). Under British rule, Bengal experienced the deindustrialisation of its pre-colonial economy.

Company policies led to the deindustrialisation of Bengal's textile industry. The capital amassed by the East India Company in Bengal was invested in the emerging Industrial Revolution in Great Britain, in industries such as textile manufacturing. Economic mismanagement, alongside drought and a smallpox epidemic, directly led to the Great Bengal famine of 1770, which is estimated to have caused the deaths of between 1 million and 10 million people.

In 1862, the Bengal Legislative Council was set up as the first modern legislature in India. Elected representation was gradually introduced during the early 20th century, including with the Morley-Minto reforms and the system of dyarchy. In 1937, the council became the upper chamber of the Bengali legislature while the Bengal Legislative Assembly was created. Between 1937 and 1947, the chief executive of the government was the Prime Minister of Bengal.

The Bengal Presidency was the largest administrative unit in the British Empire. At its height, it covered large parts of present-day India, Pakistan, Bangladesh, Burma, Malaysia, and Singapore. In 1830, the British Straits Settlements on the coast of the Malacca Straits was made a residency of Bengal. The area included the erstwhile Prince of Wales Island, Province Wellesley, Malacca and Singapore. In 1867, Penang, Singapore and Malacca were separated from Bengal into the Straits Settlements. British Burma became a province of India and a later a Crown colony in itself. Western areas, including the Ceded and Conquered Provinces and The Punjab, were further reorganised. Northeastern areas became Colonial Assam.

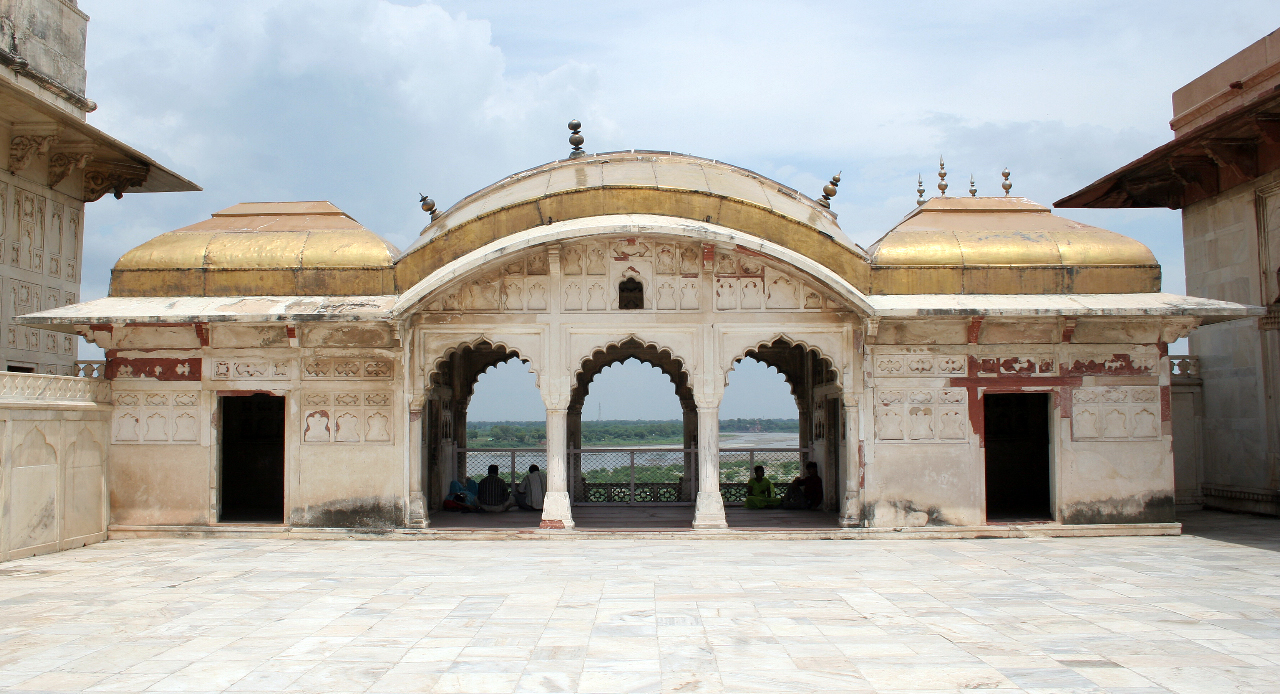
Bengal roofs seen on Mughal architecture, c. 1600s

In 1876, about 200,000 people were killed in Bengal by the Great Backerganj Cyclone of 1876 in the Barisal region. About 50 million were killed in Bengal due to massive plague outbreaks and famines which happened in 1895 to 1920, mostly in western Bengal.

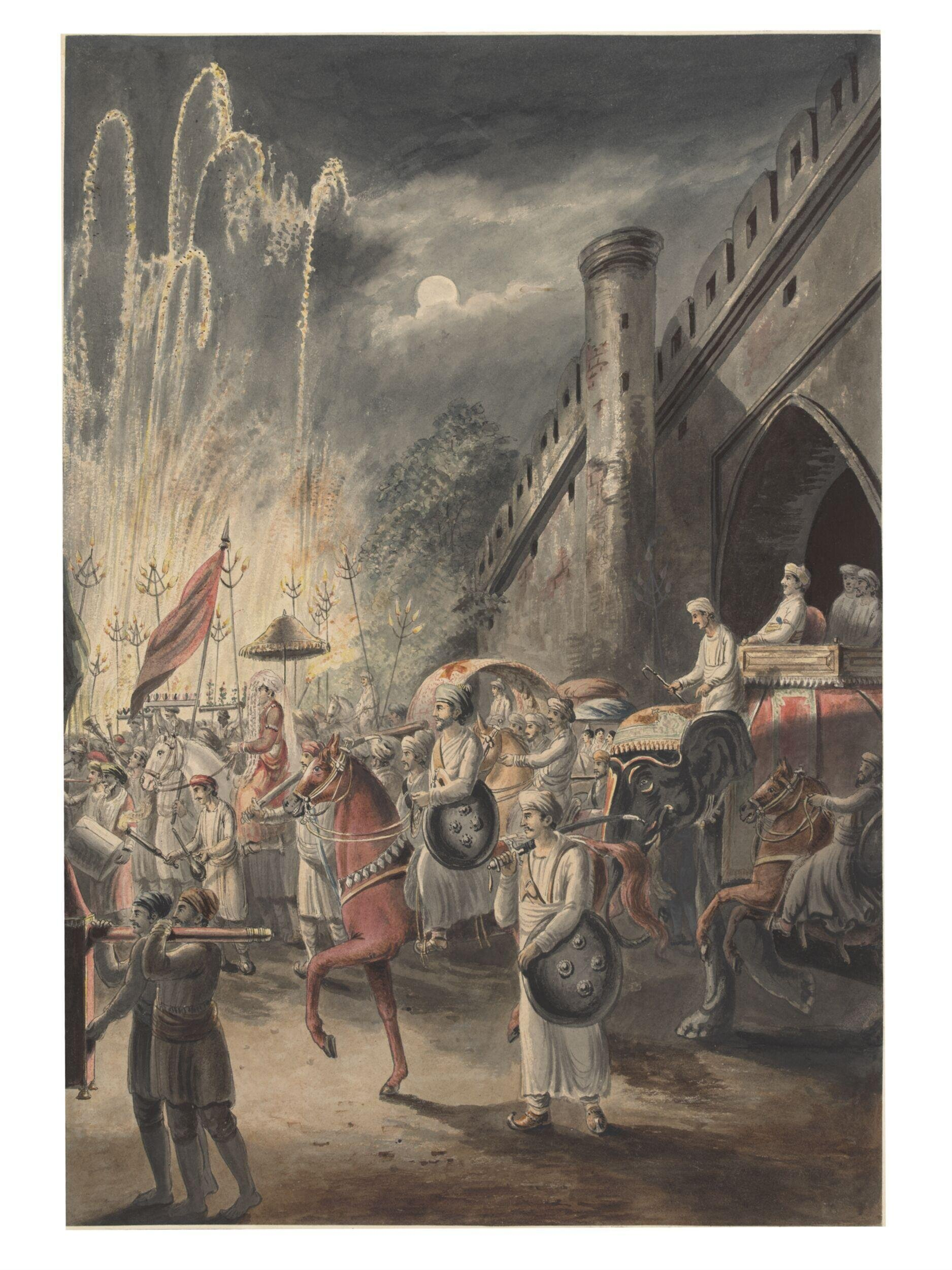
Wedding at night, Murshidabad, Bengal, 1810

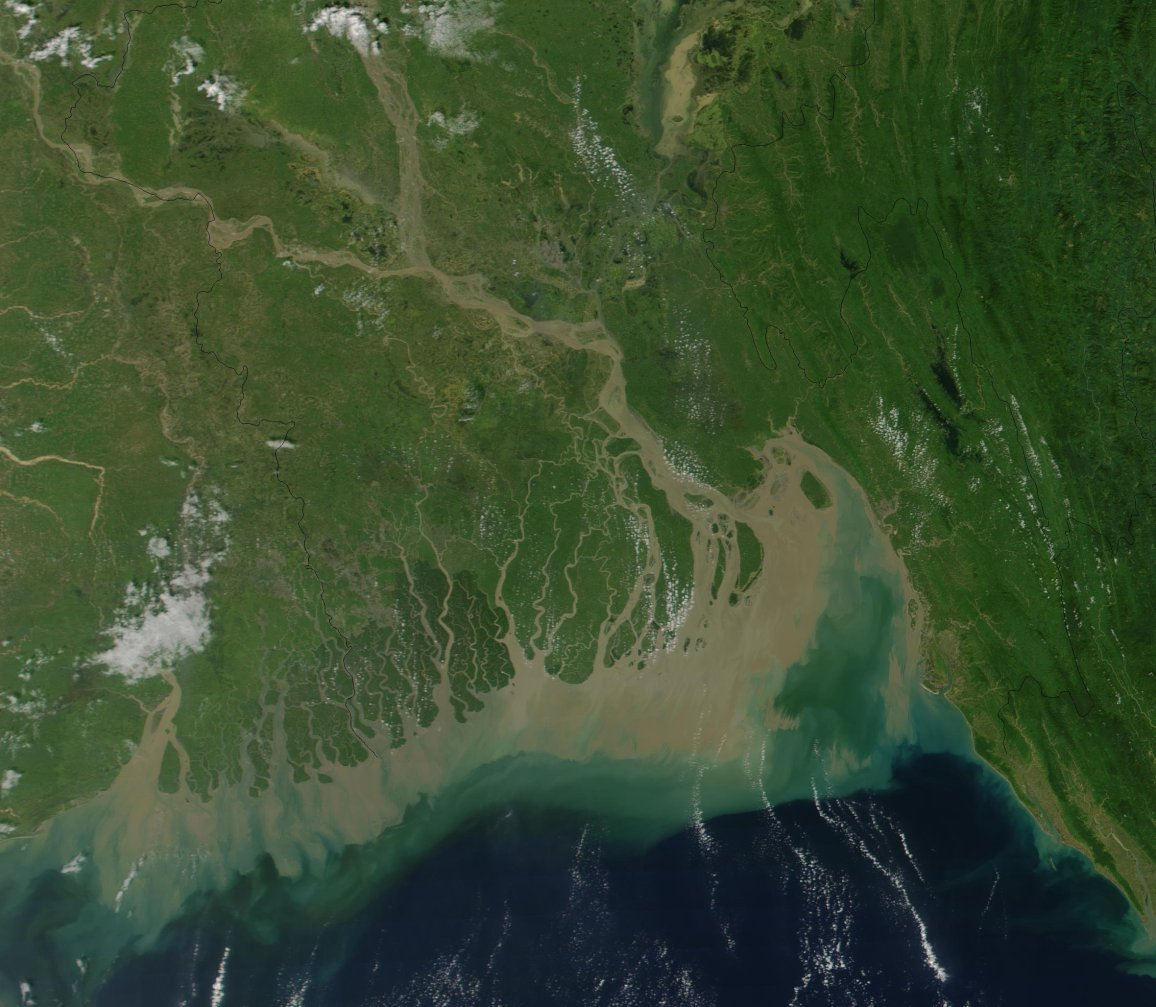
The Ganges-Brahmaputra delta

The Indian Rebellion of 1857 was initiated on the outskirts of Calcutta, and spread to Dhaka, Chittagong, Jalpaiguri, Sylhet and Agartala, in solidarity with revolts in North India. The failure of the rebellion led to the abolition of the Company Rule in India and establishment of direct rule over India by the British, commonly referred to as the British Raj. The late 19th and early 20th century Bengal Renaissance had a great impact on the cultural and economic life of Bengal and started a great advance in the literature and science of Bengal. Between 1905 and 1911, an abortive attempt was made to divide the province of Bengal into two: Bengal proper and the short-lived province of Eastern Bengal and Assam where the All India Muslim League was founded. In 1911, the Bengali poet and polymath Rabindranath Tagore became Asia's first Nobel laureate when he won the Nobel Prize in Literature.

Bengal played a major role in the Indian independence movement, in which revolutionary groups were dominant. Armed attempts to overthrow the British Raj began with the rebellion of Titumir, and reached a climax when Subhas Chandra Bose led the Indian National Army against the British. Bengal was also central in the rising political awareness of the Muslim population—the All-India Muslim League was established in Dhaka in 1906. The Muslim homeland movement pushed for a sovereign state in eastern India with the Lahore Resolution in 1943. Hindu nationalism was also strong in Bengal, which was home to groups like the Hindu Mahasabha. In spite of a last-ditch effort by politicians Huseyn Shaheed Suhrawardy, Sarat Chandra Bose to form a United Bengal, when India gained independence in 1947, Bengal was partitioned along religious lines. The western joined India (and was named West Bengal) while the eastern part joined Pakistan as a province called East Bengal (later renamed East Pakistan, giving rise to Bangladesh in 1971). The circumstances of partition were bloody, with widespread religious riots in Bengal.

=== Partition of Bengal (1947) ===
On 27 April 1947, the last Prime Minister of Bengal Huseyn Shaheed Suhrawardy held a press conference in New Delhi where he outlined his vision for an independent Bengal. Suhrawardy said "Let us pause for a moment to consider what Bengal can be if it remains united. It will be a great country, indeed the richest and the most prosperous in India capable of giving to its people a high standard of living, where a great people will be able to rise to the fullest height of their stature, a land that will truly be plentiful. It will be rich in agriculture, rich in industry and commerce and in course of time it will be one of the powerful and progressive states of the world. If Bengal remains united this will be no dream, no fantasy". On 2 June 1947, British Prime Minister Clement Attlee told the US Ambassador to the United Kingdom that there was a "distinct possibility Bengal might decide against partition and against joining either Hindustan or Pakistan".

On 3 June 1947, the Mountbatten Plan outlined the partition of British India. On 20 June, the Bengal Legislative Assembly met to decide on the partition of Bengal. At the preliminary joint meeting, it was decided (126 votes to 90) that if the province remained united, it should join the Constituent Assembly of Pakistan. At a separate meeting of legislators from West Bengal, it was decided (58 votes to 21) that the province should be partitioned and West Bengal should join the Constituent Assembly of India. At another meeting of legislators from East Bengal, it was decided (106 votes to 35) that the province should not be partitioned and (107 votes to 34) that East Bengal should join the Constituent Assembly of Pakistan if Bengal was partitioned. On 6 July, the Sylhet district of Assam voted in a referendum to join East Bengal.

The English barrister Cyril Radcliffe was instructed to draw the borders of Pakistan and India. The Radcliffe Line created the boundary between the Dominion of India and the Dominion of Pakistan, which later became the Bangladesh-India border. The Radcliffe Line awarded two-thirds of Bengal as the eastern wing of Pakistan, although the historic Bengali capitals of Gaur, Pandua, Murshidabad and Calcutta fell on the Indian side close to the border with Pakistan. Dhaka's status as a capital was also restored.

== Geography ==
Most of the Bengal region lies in the Ganges-Brahmaputra delta, but there are highlands in its north, northeast and southeast. The Ganges Delta arises from the confluence of the rivers Ganges, Brahmaputra, and Meghna rivers and their respective tributaries. The total area of Bengal is 237,212 square kilometres (91,588 sq mi)—West Bengal is 88,752 km^{2} (34,267 sq mi) and Bangladesh 148,460 km^{2} (57,321 sq mi).

The flat and fertile Bangladesh Plain dominates the geography of Bangladesh. The Chittagong Hill Tracts and Sylhet region are home to most of the mountains in Bangladesh. Most parts of Bangladesh are within 10 metres (33 feet) above the sea level, and it is believed that about 10% of the land would be flooded if the sea level were to rise by 1 metre (3.3 feet). Because of this low elevation, much of this region is exceptionally vulnerable to seasonal flooding due to monsoons. The highest point in Bangladesh is in Mowdok range at 1,052 metres (3,451 feet). A major part of the coastline comprises a marshy jungle, the Sundarbans, the largest mangrove forest in the world and home to diverse flora and fauna, including the royal Bengal tiger. In 1997, this region was declared endangered.

West Bengal is on the eastern bottleneck of India, stretching from the Himalayas in the north to the Bay of Bengal in the south. The state has a total area of 88,752 km^{2} (34,267 sq mi). The Darjeeling Himalayan hill region in the northern extreme of the state belongs to the eastern Himalaya. This region contains Sandakfu (3,636 m (11,929 ft))—the highest peak of the state. The narrow Terai region separates this region from the plains, which in turn transitions into the Ganges delta towards the south. The Rarh region intervenes between the Ganges delta in the east and the western plateau and high lands. A small coastal region is on the extreme south, while the Sundarbans mangrove forests form a remarkable geographical landmark at the Ganges delta.

At least nine districts in West Bengal and 42 districts in Bangladesh have arsenic levels in groundwater above the World Health Organization maximum permissible limit of 50 μg/L or 50 parts per billion and the untreated water is unfit for human consumption. The water causes arsenicosis, skin cancer and various other complications in the body.

=== Geographic distinctions ===
==== North Bengal ====
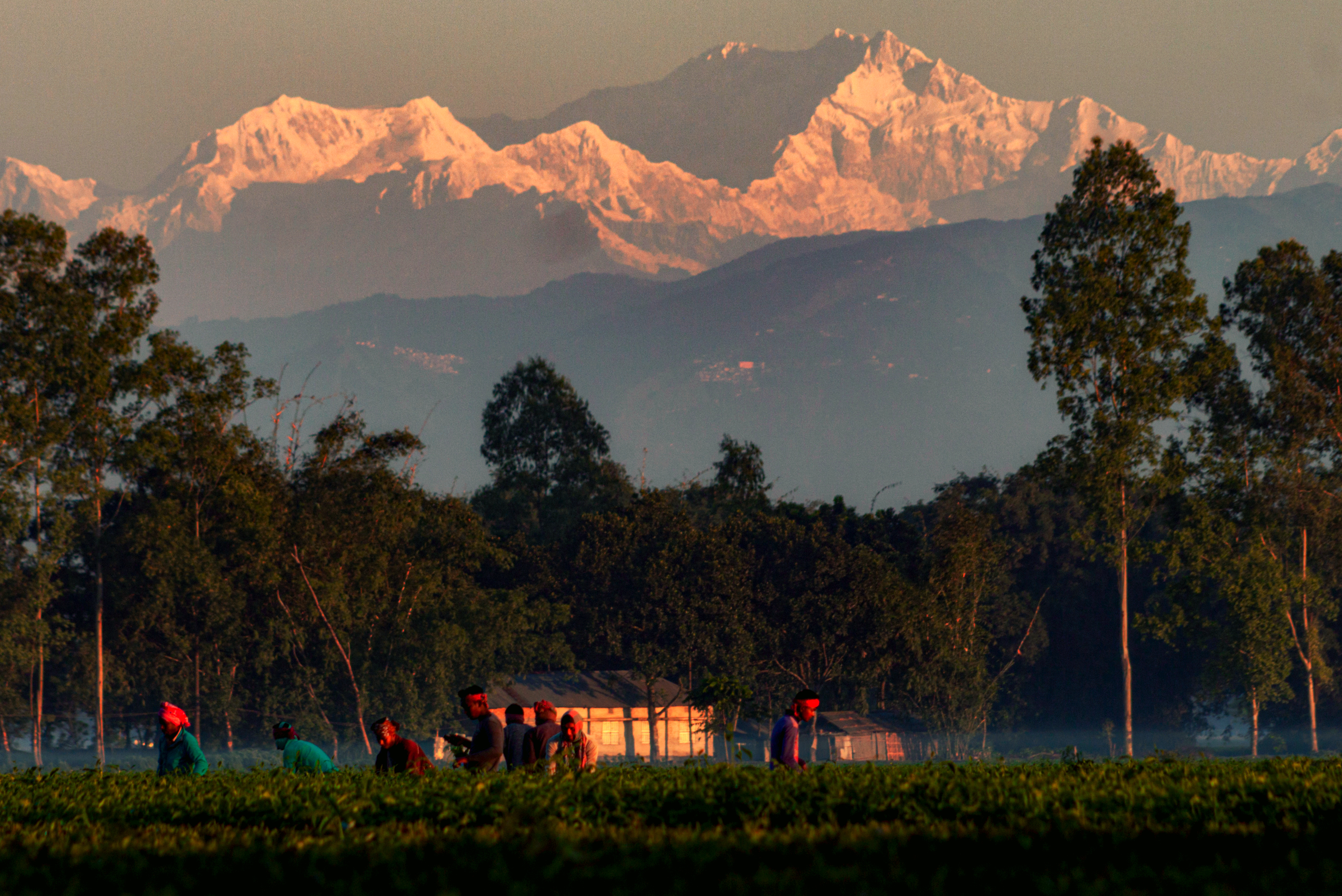
Kangchenjunga, the third highest mountain in the world, seen from a tea garden in Bangladesh. Kangchenjunga is often visible from the plains of Tetulia in the northernmost tip of Bangladesh.

North Bengal is a term used for the north-western part of Bangladesh and northern part of West Bengal. The Bangladeshi part comprises Rajshahi Division and Rangpur Division. Generally, it is the area lying west of Jamuna River and north of Padma River, and includes the Barind Tract. Politically, West Bengal's part comprises Jalpaiguri Division and most of Malda division (except Murshidabad district) together and Bihar's parts include Kishanganj district. Darjeeling Hilly are also part of North Bengal. The people of Jaipaiguri, Alipurduar and Cooch Behar usually identify themselves as North Bengali. North Bengal is divided into Terai and Dooars regions. North Bengal is also noted for its rich cultural heritage, including two UNESCO World Heritage Sites. Aside from the Bengali majority, North Bengal is home to many other communities including Nepalis, Santhalis, Lepchas and Rajbongshis.

==== Northeast Bengal ====
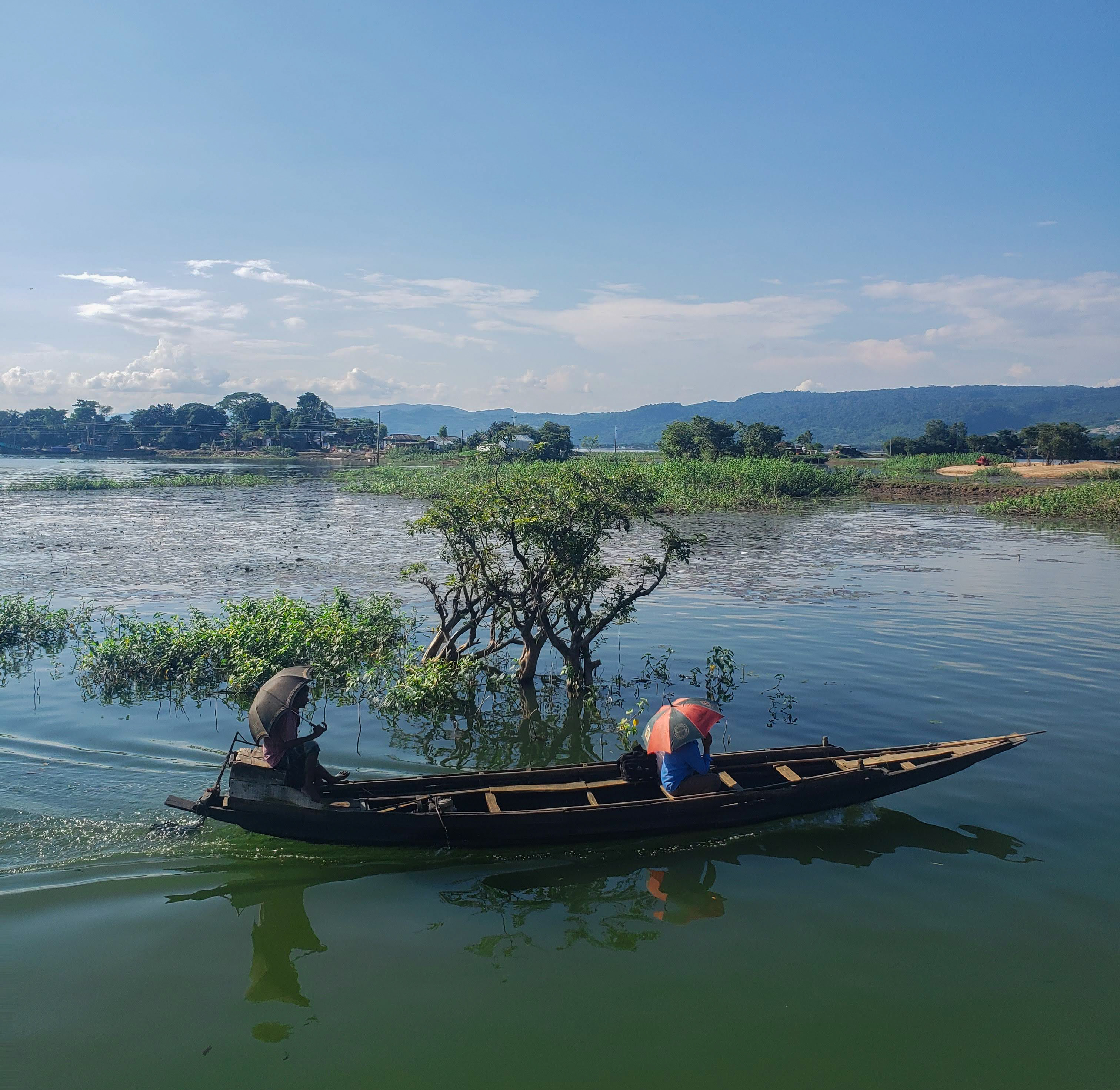
Tanguar Haor in Sunamganj District, Bangladesh. Haor are a common sight in the northeast of Bengal.

Northeast Bengal refers to the Sylhet region, which today comprises the Sylhet Division of Bangladesh and Barak Valley in the Indian state of Assam. The region is famous for its fertile land terrain, many rivers, extensive tea plantations, rainforests and wetlands. The Brahmaputra and Barak river are the geographic markers of the area. The city of Sylhet is its largest urban centre, and the region is known for its unique regional Sylheti language. The ancient name of the region is Srihatta and Nasratshahi. The region was ruled by the Kamarupa and Harikela kingdoms as well as the Bengal Sultanate. It later became a district of the Mughal Empire. Alongside the predominant Bengali population resides a small Garo, Bishnupriya Manipuri, Khasia and other tribal minorities.

The region is the crossroads of Bengal and northeast India.

==== Central Bengal ====
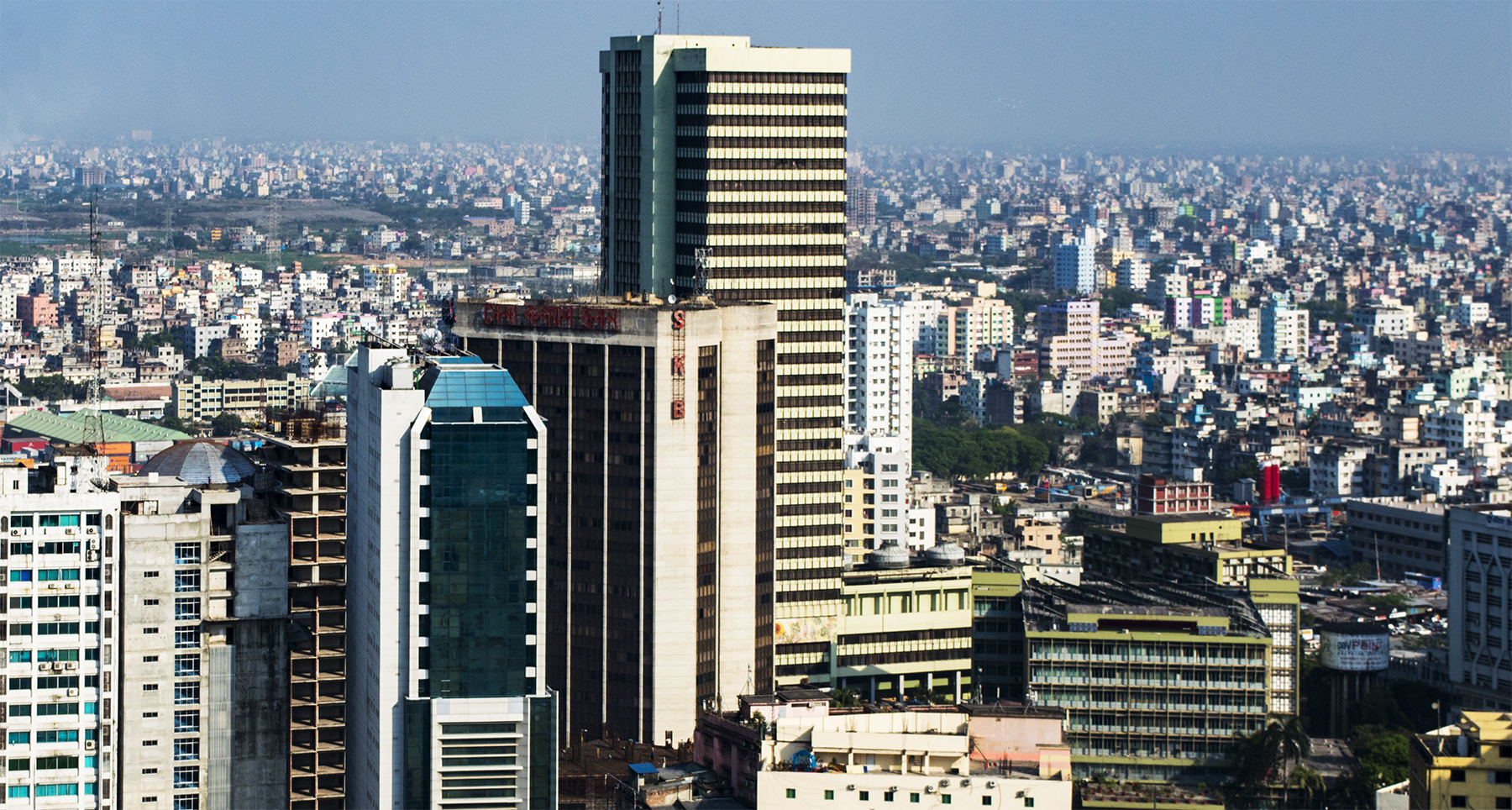
Central Bengal, one of the most urban and developed regions in Bengal.

Central Bengal refers to the Dhaka Division of Bangladesh. It includes the elevated Madhupur tract with a large Sal tree forest. The Padma River cuts through the southern part of the region, separating the greater Faridpur region. In the north lies the greater Mymensingh and Tangail regions.

==== South Bengal ====
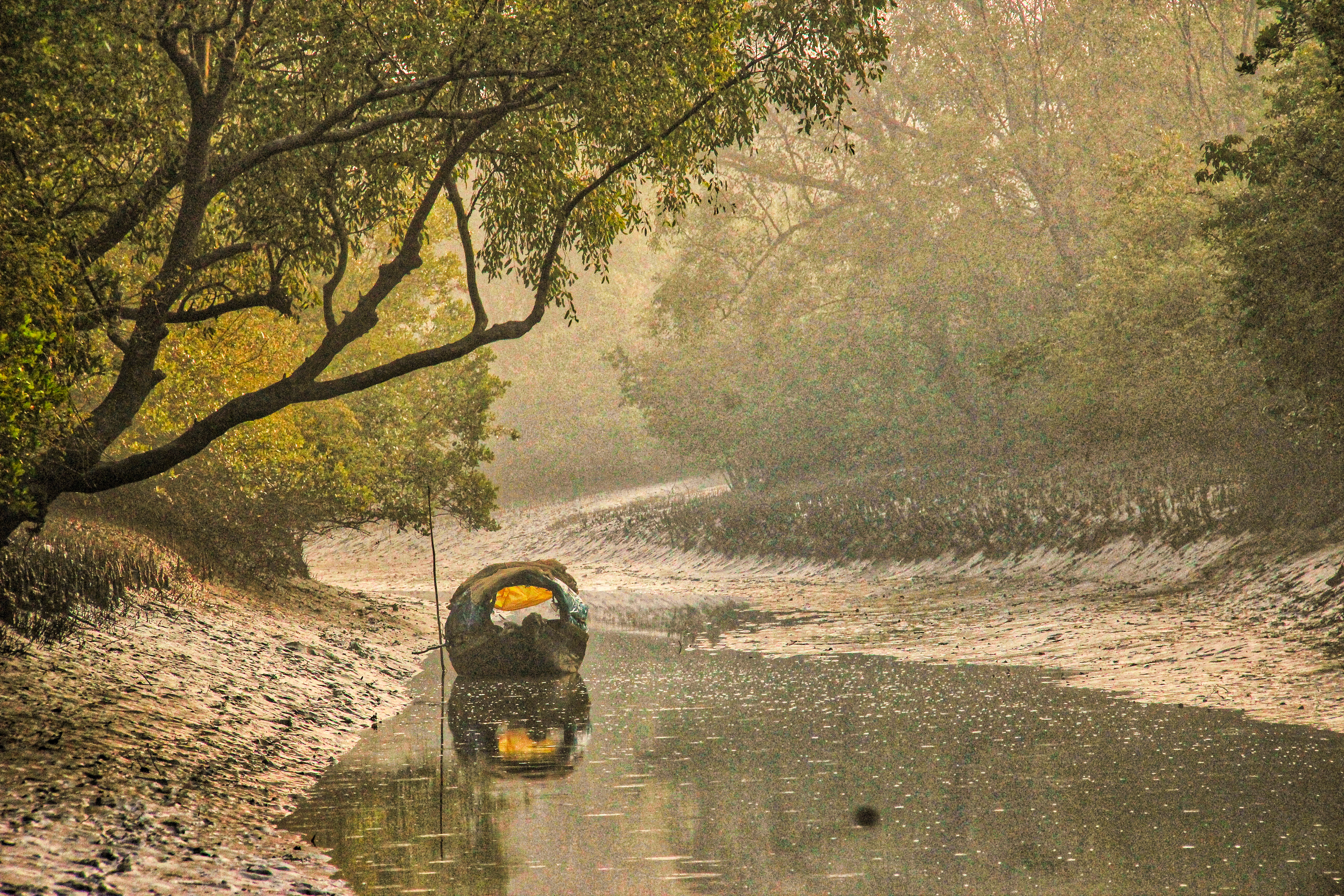
Sundarbans, the world's largest mangrove forest, is located in southern Bengal.

South Bengal covers the southwestern Bangladesh and the southern part of the Indian state of West Bengal. The Bangladeshi part includes Khulna Division, Barisal Division and the proposed Faridpur Division The part of South Bengal of West Bengal includes Presidency division, Burdwan division, Medinipur division and Murshidabad district of Malda division.

The Sundarbans, a major biodiversity hotspot, is located in South Bengal. Bangladesh hosts two-thirds of the forest, with the remainder in India.

==== Southeast Bengal ====
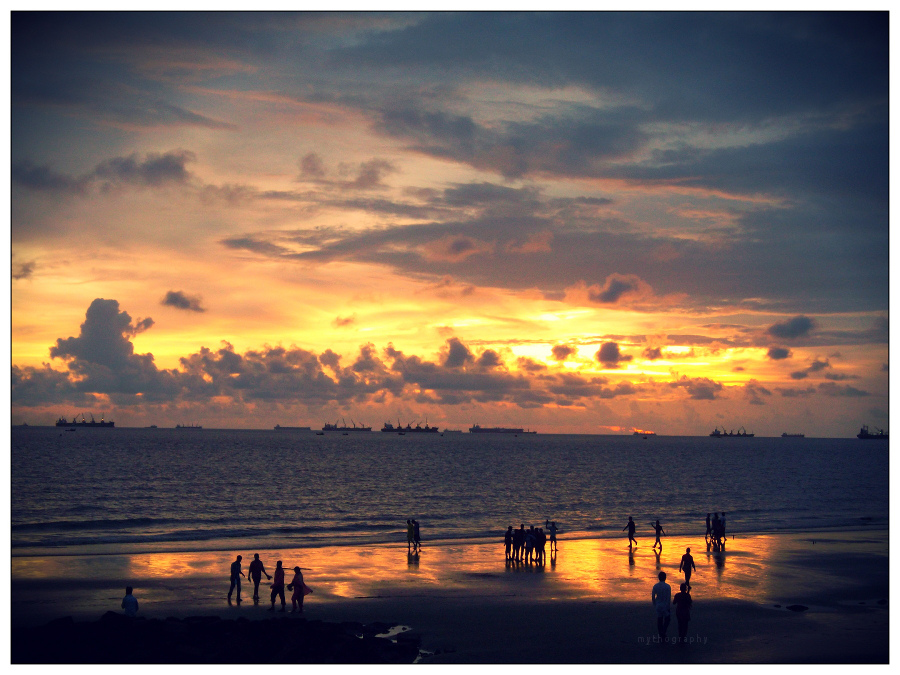
Sunset at Potenga Beach, Chittagong, Bangladesh.

Southeast Bengal refers to the hilly-coastal Chittagonian-speaking, Noakhali-speaking and Bengali-speaking areas of Chittagong Division in southeastern Bangladesh. The region is noted for its thalassocratic and seafaring heritage. The area was dominated by the Bengali Harikela and Samatata kingdoms in antiquity. It was known to Arab traders as Samandar in the 9th century. During the medieval period, the region was ruled by the Chandra dynasty, the sultanate of Bengal, the kingdom of Tripura, the kingdom of Mrauk U, the Portuguese Empire and the Mughal Empire, prior to the advent of British rule. The Chittagonian language, a sister of Bengali is prevalent in coastal areas of southeast Bengal. Besides Chittagonian, other regional languages, such as Noakhali or Noakhailla, are also spoken in this region. Along with its Bengali population, it is also home to Tibeto-Burman ethnic groups, including the Chakma, Marma, Tripura, Mru, Tanchangya, Bawm and other Jumma peoples.

Southeast Bengal is considered a bridge to Southeast Asia and the northern parts of Arakan are also historically considered to be a part of it.

=== Places of interest ===
There are four World Heritage Sites in the region, including the Sundarbans, the Somapura Mahavihara, the Mosque City of Bagerhat and the Darjeeling Himalayan Railway. Other prominent places include the Bishnupur, Bankura temple city, the Adina Mosque, the Caravanserai Mosque, numerous zamindar palaces (like Ahsan Manzil and Cooch Behar Palace), the Lalbagh Fort, the Great Caravanserai ruins, the Shaista Khan Caravanserai ruins, the Kolkata Victoria Memorial, the Dhaka Parliament Building, archaeologically excavated ancient fort cities in Mahasthangarh, Mainamati, Chandraketugarh and Wari-Bateshwar, the Jaldapara National Park, the Lawachara National Park, the Teknaf Game Reserve and the Chittagong Hill Tracts.

Cox's Bazar in southeastern Bangladesh is home to the longest natural sea beach in the world with an unbroken length of 120 km (75 mi). It is also a growing surfing destination. St. Martin's Island, off the coast of Chittagong Division, is home to the sole coral reef in Bengal.

=== Other regions ===
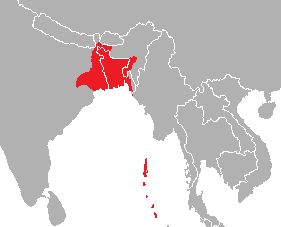
Today, Bengali is still spoken in areas beside Bengal proper, including the Barak Valley, Tripura and the Andaman and Nicobar Islands.

Bengal was a regional power of South Asia. The administrative jurisdiction of Bengal historically extended beyond the territory of Bengal proper. In the 9th century, the Pala Empire of Bengal ruled large parts of northern India. The Bengal Sultanate controlled Bengal, Assam, Arakan, Bihar and Orissa at different periods in history. In Mughal Bengal, the Nawab of Bengal had a jurisdiction covering Bengal, Bihar and Orissa. Bengal's administrative jurisdiction reached its greatest extent under the British Empire, when the Bengal Presidency extended from the Straits of Malacca in the east to the Khyber Pass in the west. In the late-19th and early-20th centuries, administrative reorganisation drastically reduced the territory of Bengal.

Several regions bordering Bengal proper continue to have high levels of Bengali influence. The Indian state of Tripura has a Bengali majority population. Bengali influence is also prevalent in the Indian regions of Assam, Meghalaya, Bihar and the Andaman and Nicobar Islands; as well as in Myanmar's Rakhine State.

==== Arakan ====
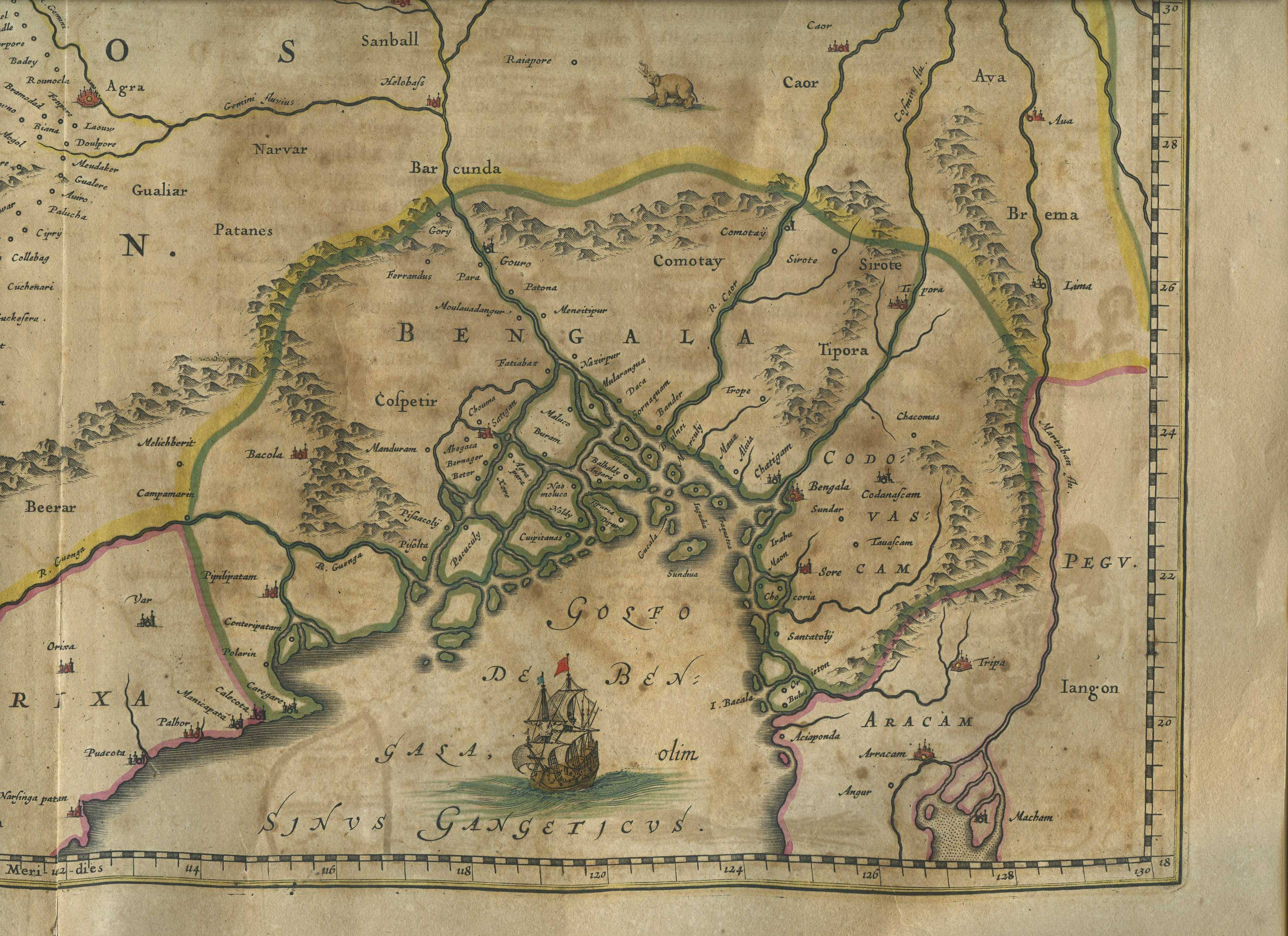
Bengal and Arakan in 1638

Arakan (now Rakhine State, Myanmar) has historically been under strong Bengali influence. Since antiquity, Bengal has influenced the culture of Arakan. The ancient Bengali script was used in Arakan. An Arakanese inscription recorded the reign of the Bengali Candra dynasty. Paul Wheatley described the "Indianization" of Arakan.

According to Pamela Gutman, "Arakan was ruled by kings who adopted Indian titles and traditions to suit their own environment. Indian Brahmins conducted royal ceremonies, Buddhist monks spread their teachings, traders came and went and artists and architects used Indian models for inspiration. In the later period, there was also influence from the Islamic courts of Bengal and Delhi". Arakan emerged as a vassal state of the Bengal Sultanate. It later became an independent kingdom. The royal court and culture of the Kingdom of Mrauk U was heavily influenced by Bengal. Bengali Muslims served in the royal court as ministers and military commanders. Bengali Hindus and Bengali Buddhists served as priests. Some of the most important poets of medieval Bengali literature lived in Arakan, including Alaol and Daulat Qazi. In 1660, Prince Shah Shuja, the governor of Mughal Bengal and a pretender of the Peacock Throne of India, was forced to seek asylum in Arakan. Bengali influence in the Arakanese royal court persisted until Burmese annexation in the 18th century.

The modern-day Rohingya population is a legacy of Bengal's influence on Arakan. The Rohingya genocide resulted in the displacement of over a million people between 2016 and 2017, with many being uprooted from their homes in Rakhine State.

==== Assam ====
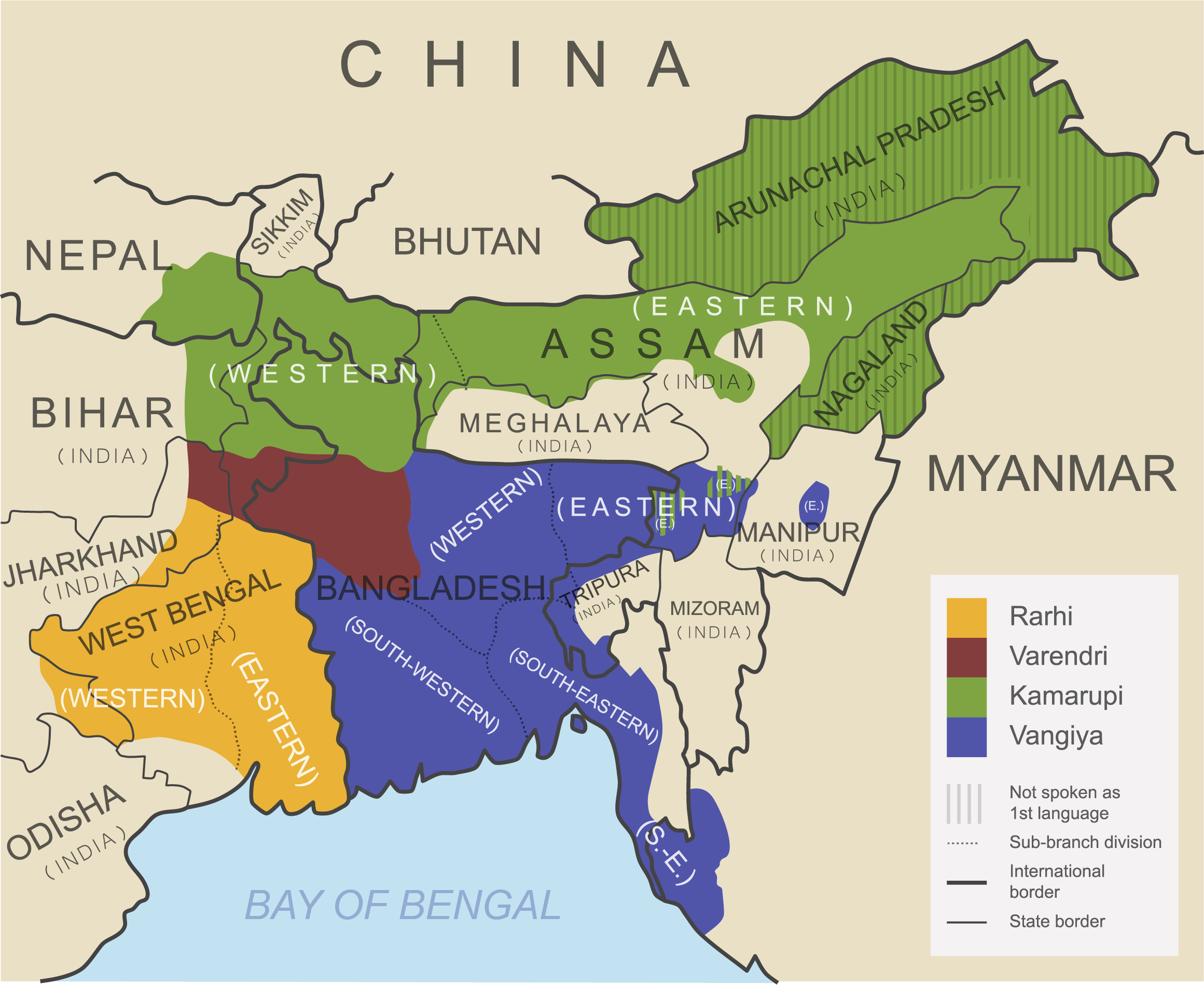
Region of the Bengali-Assamese languages

The Indian state of Assam shares many cultural similarities with Bengal. The Assamese language uses the same script as the Bengali language. The Barak Valley has a Bengali-speaking majority population. During the Partition of India, Assam was also partitioned along with Bengal. The Sylhet Division joined East Bengal in Pakistan, with the exception of Karimganj which joined Indian Assam. Previously, East Bengal and Assam were part of a single province called Eastern Bengal and Assam between 1905 and 1912 under the British Raj.

Assam and Bengal were often part of the same kingdoms, including Kamarupa, Gauda and Kamata. Large parts of Assam were annexed by Alauddin Hussain Shah during the Bengal Sultanate. Assam was one of the few regions in the subcontinent to successfully resist Mughal expansion and never fell completely under Mughal rule.

==== Andaman and Nicobar Islands ====
Bengali is the most spoken language among the population of the Andaman and Nicobar Islands, a strategically important archipelago which is controlled by India as a federal territory. The islands were once used as a British penal colony. During World War II, the islands were seized by the Japanese and controlled by the Provisional Government of Free India. Anti-British leader Subhash Chandra Bose visited and renamed the islands. Between 1949 and 1971, the Indian government resettled many Bengali Hindus in the Andaman and Nicobar Islands.

==== Bihar ====
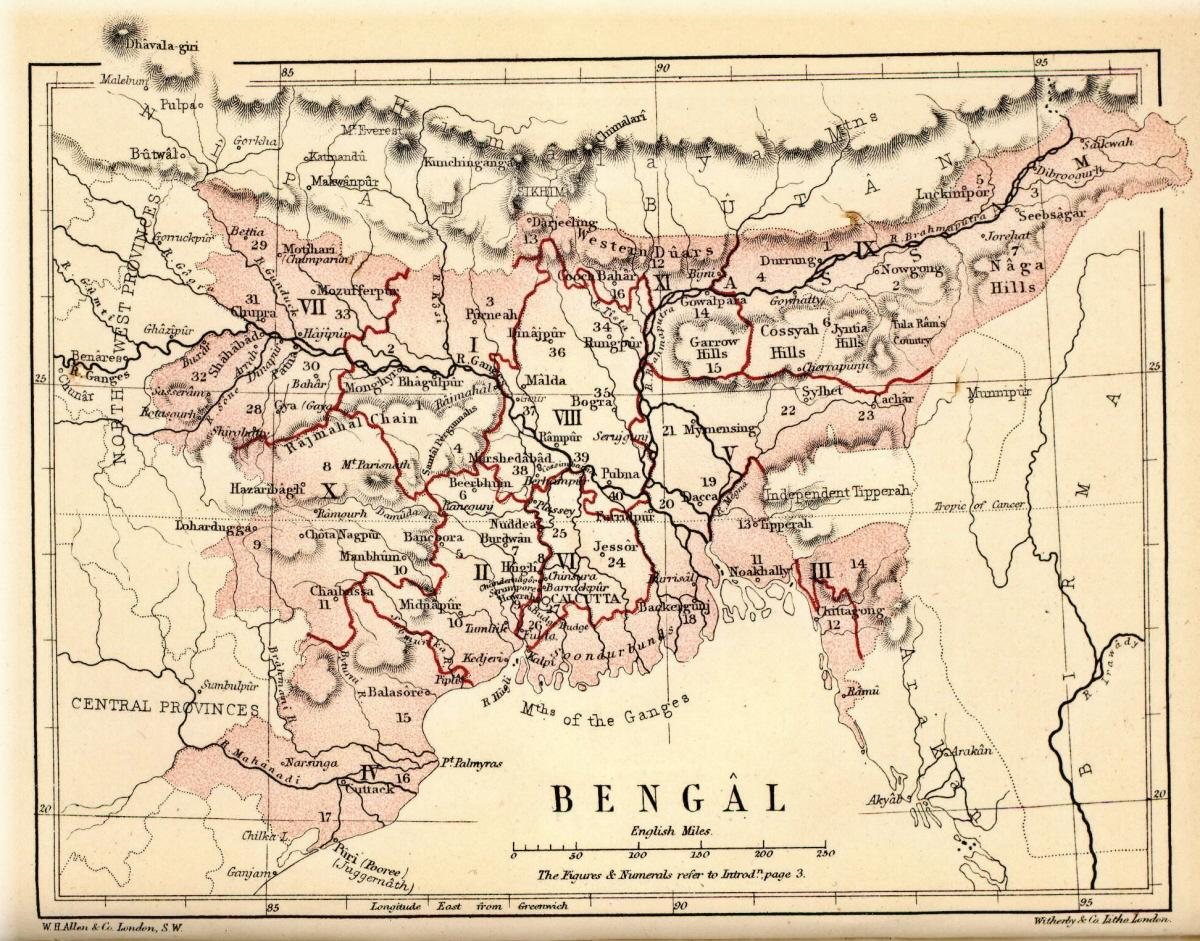
Bengal in 1880, including Bihar, Orissa and Assam

In antiquity, Bihar and Bengal were often part of the same kingdoms. The ancient region of Magadha covered both Bihar and Bengal. Magadha was the birthplace or bastion of several pan-Indian empires, including the Mauryan Empire, the Gupta Empire and the Pala Empire. Bengal, Bihar and Orissa together formed a single province under the Mughal Empire. The Nawab of Bengal was styled as the Nawab of Bengal, Bihar and Orissa.

==== Chittagong Hill Tracts ====
The Chittagong Hill Tracts is the southeastern frontier of Bangladesh. Its indigenous population includes Tibeto-Burman ethnicities, including the Chakma people, Bawm people and Mro people among others. The region was historically ruled by tribal chieftains of the Chakma Circle and Bohmong Circle. In 1713, the Chakma Raja signed a treaty with Mughal Bengal after obtaining permission from Emperor Farrukhsiyar for trade with the plains of Chittagong. Like the kings of Arakan, the Chakma Circle began to fashion themselves using Mughal nomenclatures and titles. They initially resisted the Permanent Settlement and the activities of the East India Company. The tribal royal families of the region came under heavy Bengali influence. The Chakma queen Benita Roy was a friend of Rabindranath Tagore. The region was governed by the Chittagong Hill Tracts manual under colonial rule. The manual was significantly amended after the end of British rule; and the region became fully integrated with Bangladesh.

==== Malay Archipelago ====
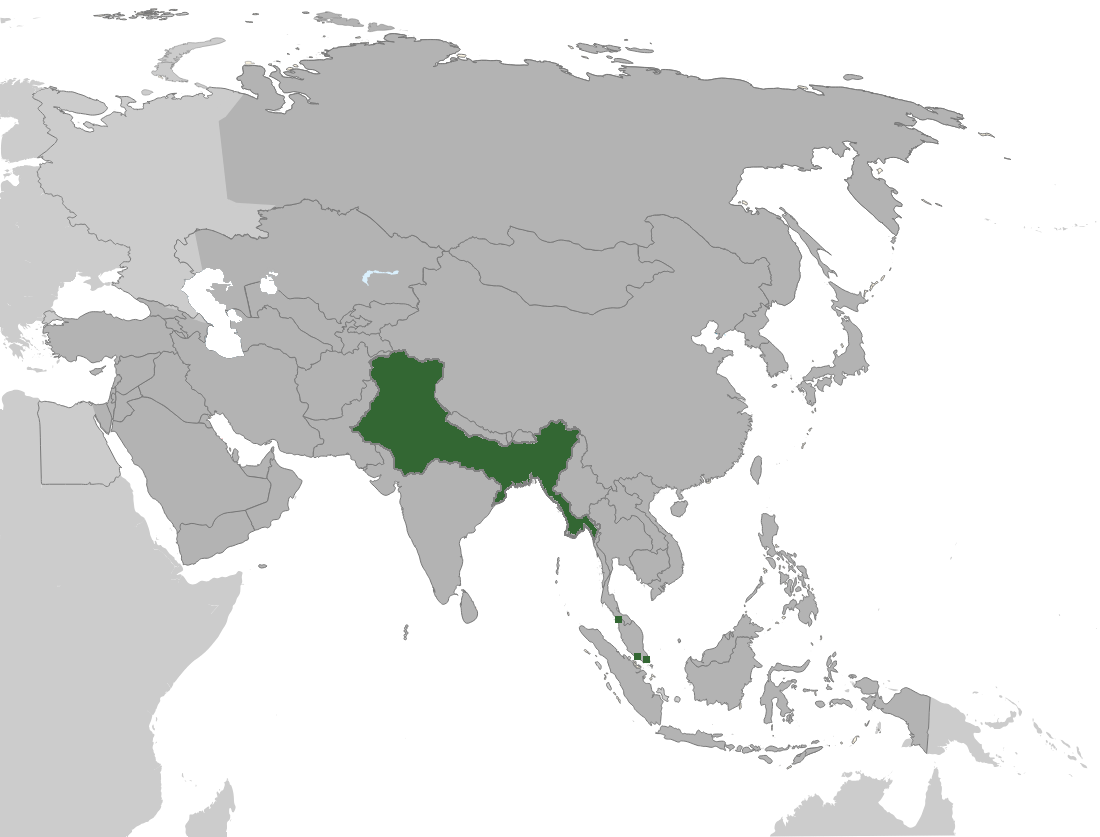
Extent of the Bengal Presidency between 1858 and 1867, including the Straits Settlements

Through trade, settlements and the exchange of ideas; parts of Maritime Southeast Asia became linked with Bengal. Language, literature, art, governing systems, religions and philosophies in ancient Sumatra and Java were influenced by Bengal. Hindu-Buddhist kingdoms in Southeast Asia depended on the Bay of Bengal for trade and ideas. Islam in Southeast Asia also spread through the Bay of Bengal, which was a bridge between the Malay Archipelago and Indo-Islamic states of South Asia. A large number of wealthy merchants from Bengal were based in Malacca. Bengali ships were the largest ships in the waters of the Malay Archipelago during the 15th century.

Between 1830 and 1867, the ports of Singapore and Malacca, the island of Penang, and a portion of the Malay Peninsula were ruled under the jurisdiction of the Bengal Presidency of the British Empire. These areas were known as the Straits Settlements, which was separated from the Bengal Presidency and converted into a Crown colony in 1867.

==== Meghalaya ====
The Indian state of Meghalaya historically came under the influence of Shah Jalal, a Muslim missionary and conqueror from Sylhet. During British rule, the city of Shillong was the summer capital of Eastern Bengal and Assam (modern Bangladesh and Northeast India). Shillong boasted the highest per capita income in British India.

==== North India ====
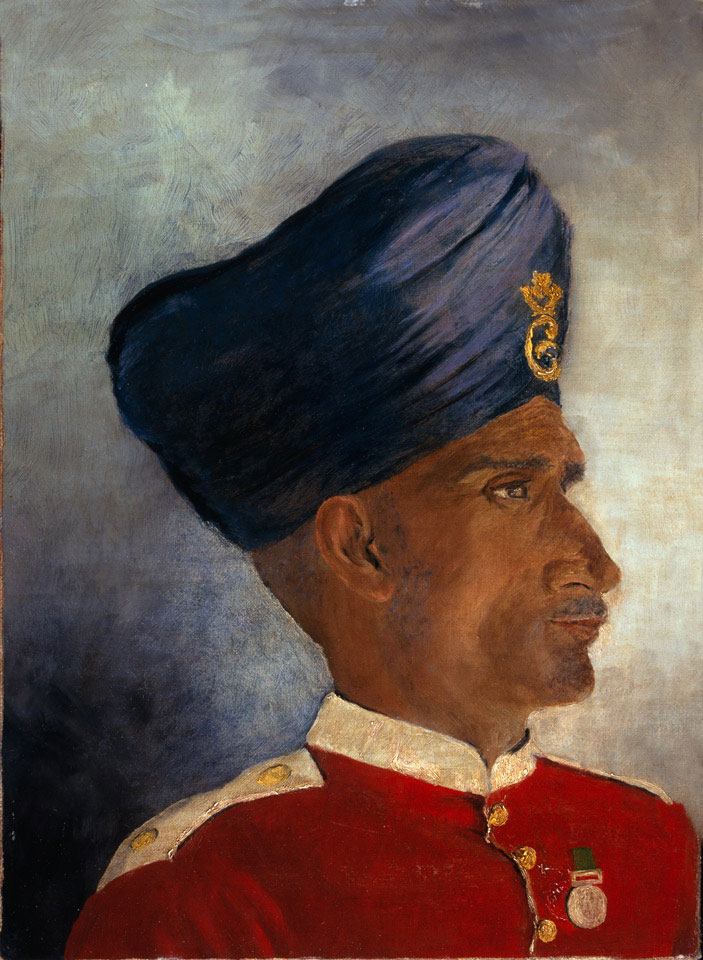
A sepoy of the Bengal Army, which played a key role in the expansion of the Bengal Presidency into the northern reaches of India up to the Khyber Pass

The ancient Mauryan, Gupta and Pala empires of the Magadha region (Bihar and Bengal) extended into northern India. The westernmost border of the Bengal Sultanate extended towards Varanasi and Jaunpur. In the 19th century, Punjab and the Ceded and Conquered Provinces formed the western extent of the Bengal Presidency. According to the British historian Rosie Llewellyn-Jones, "The Bengal Presidency, an administrative division introduced by the East India Company, would later include not only the whole of northern India up to the Khyber Pass on the north-west frontier with Afghanistan, but would spread eastwards to Burma and Singapore as well".

==== Odisha ====
Odisha, previously known as Orissa, has a significant Bengali minority. Historically, the region has faced invasions from Bengal, including an invasion by Shamsuddin Ilyas Shah. Parts of the region were ruled by the Bengal Sultanate and Mughal Bengal. The Nawab of Bengal was styled as the "Nawab of Bengal, Bihar and Orissa" because the Nawab was granted jurisdiction over Orissa by the Mughal Emperor.

==== Tibet ====
During the Pala dynasty, Tibet received missionaries from Bengal who influenced the emergence of Tibetan Buddhism. One of the most notable missionaries was Atisa. During the 13th century, Tibet experienced an Islamic invasion by the forces of Bakhtiyar Khalji, the Muslim conqueror of Bengal.

==== Tripura ====
The princely state of Tripura was ruled by the Manikya dynasty until the 1949 Tripura Merger Agreement. Tripura was historically a vassal state of Bengal. After assuming the throne with military support from the Bengal Sultanate in 1464, Ratna Manikya I introduced administrative reforms inspired by the government of Bengal. The Tripura kings requested Sultan Barbak Shah to provide manpower for developing the administration of Tripura. As a result, Bengali Hindu bureaucrats, cultivators and artisans began settling in Tripura. Today, the Indian state of Tripura has a Bengali-majority population. Modern Tripura is a gateway for trade and transport links between Bangladesh and Northeast India. In Bengali culture, the celebrated singer S. D. Burman was a member of the Tripura royal family.

=== Flora and fauna ===
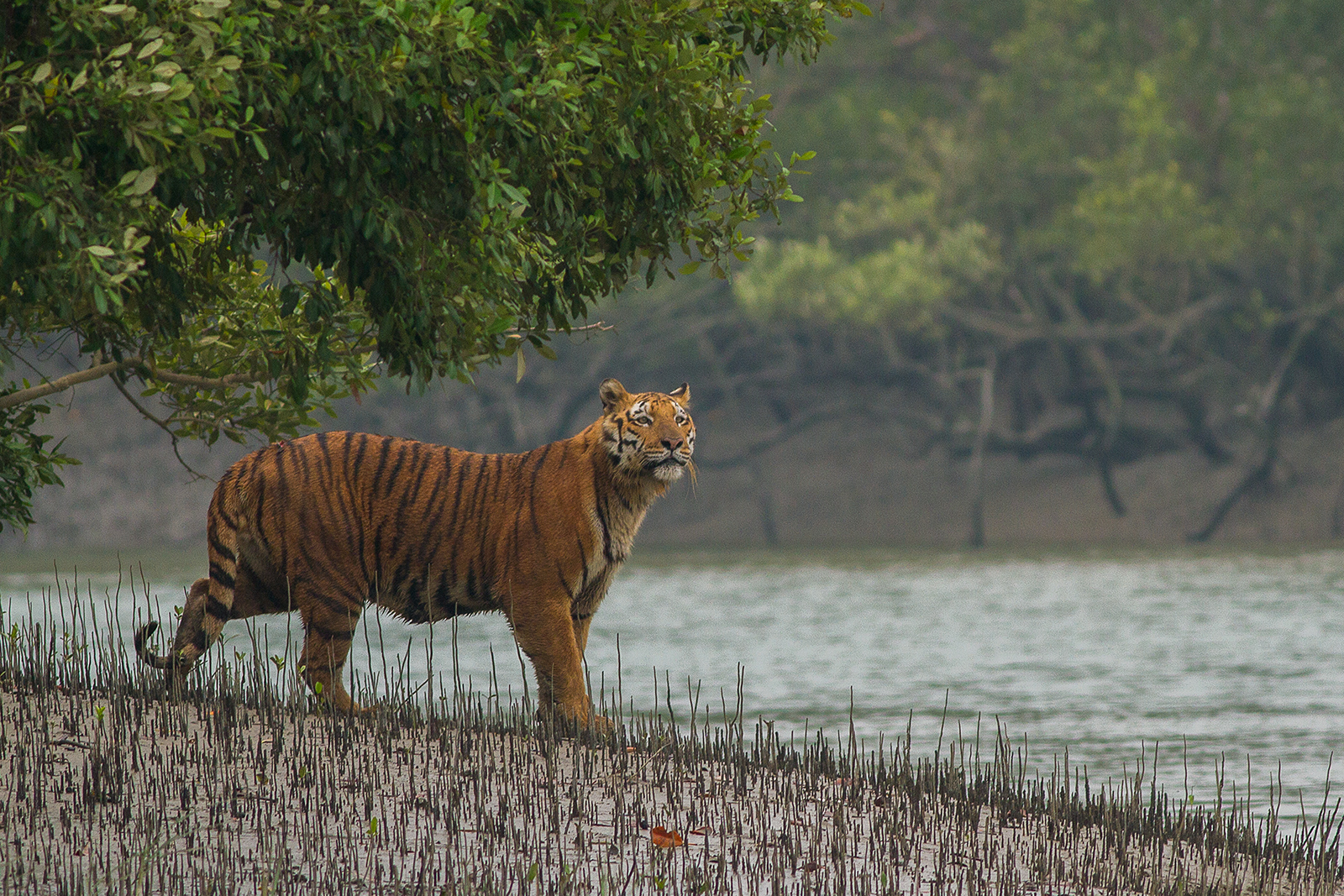
The Bengal tiger

The flat Bengal Plain, which covers most of Bangladesh and West Bengal, is one of the most fertile areas on Earth, with lush vegetation and farmland dominating its landscape. Bengali villages are buried among groves of mango, jackfruit, betel nut and date palm. Rice, jute, mustard and sugarcane plantations are a common sight. Water bodies and wetlands provide a habitat for many aquatic plants in the Ganges-Brahmaputra delta. The northern part of the region features Himalayan foothills (Dooars) with densely wooded Sal and other tropical evergreen trees. Above an elevation of 1,000 metres (3,300 ft), the forest becomes predominantly subtropical, with a predominance of temperate-forest trees such as oaks, conifers and rhododendrons. Sal woodland is also found across central Bangladesh, particularly in the Bhawal National Park. The Lawachara National Park is a rainforest in northeastern Bangladesh. The Chittagong Hill Tracts in southeastern Bangladesh is noted for its high degree of biodiversity.

The littoral Sundarbans in the southwestern part of Bengal is the largest mangrove forest in the world and a UNESCO World Heritage Site. The region has over 89 species of mammals, 628 species of birds and numerous species of fish. For Bangladesh, the water lily, the oriental magpie-robin, the hilsa and mango tree are national symbols. For West Bengal, the white-throated kingfisher, the chatim tree and the night-flowering jasmine are state symbols. The Bengal tiger is the national animal of Bangladesh and India. The fishing cat is the state animal of West Bengal.

== Politics ==
Today, the region of Bengal proper is divided between the sovereign state of the People's Republic of Bangladesh and the Indian state of West Bengal. The Bengali-speaking Barak Valley forms part of the Indian state of Assam. The Indian state of Tripura has a Bengali-speaking majority and was formerly the princely state of Hill Tipperah. In the Bay of Bengal, St. Martin's Island is governed by Bangladesh; while the Andaman and Nicobar Islands has a plurality of Bengali speakers and is governed by India's federal government as a union territory.

=== Bangladeshi Republic ===
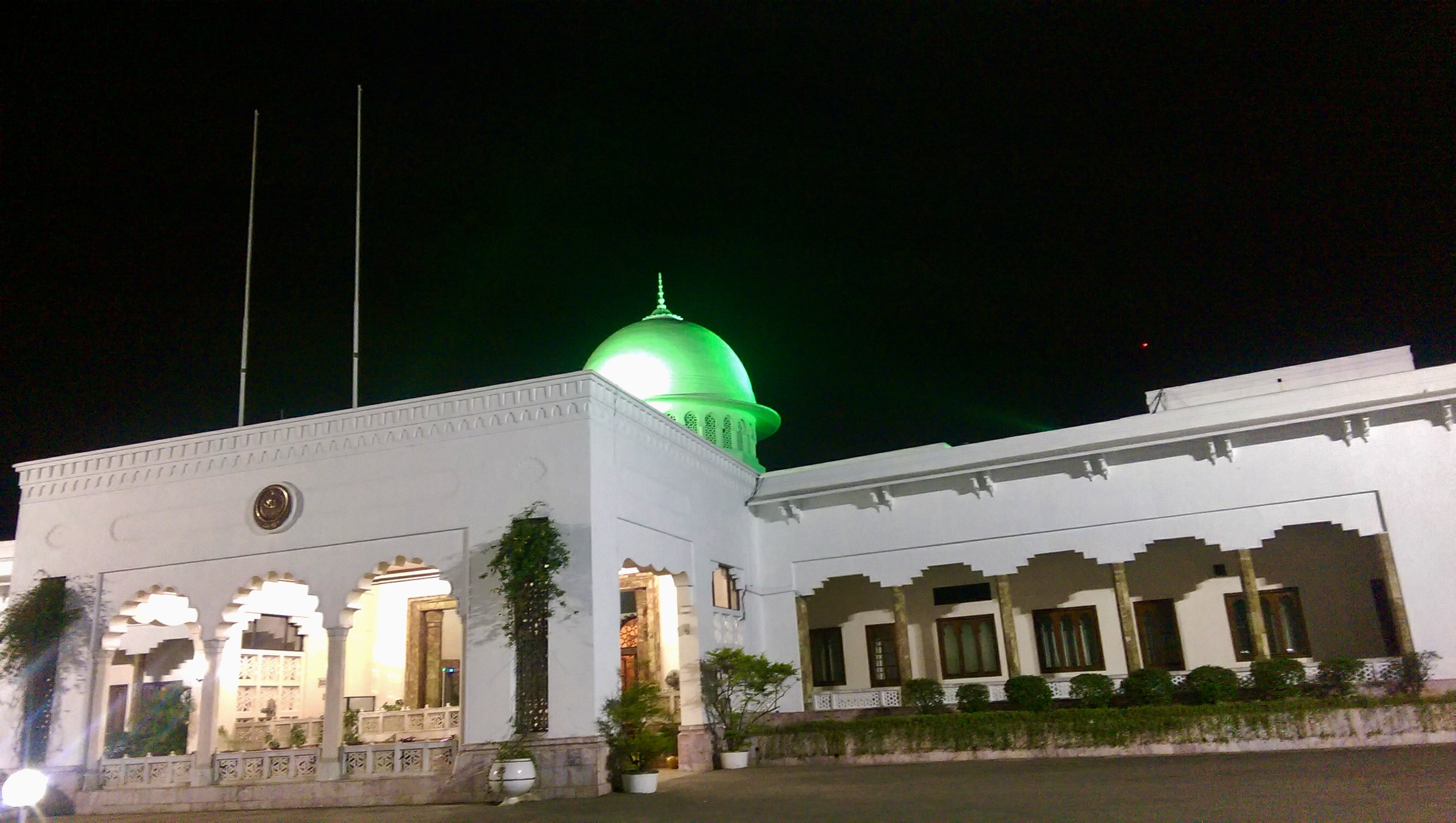
Bangabhaban (the House of Bengal) is the presidential palace of Bangladesh.

The state of Bangladesh is a parliamentary republic based on the Westminster system, with a written constitution and a President elected by parliament for mostly ceremonial purposes. The government is headed by a Prime Minister, who is appointed by the President from among the popularly elected 300 Members of Parliament in the Jatiyo Sangshad, the national parliament. The Prime Minister is traditionally the leader of the single largest party in the Jatiyo Sangshad. Under the constitution, while recognising Islam as the country's established religion, the constitution grants freedom of religion to non-Muslims.

Between 1975 and 1990, Bangladesh had a presidential system of government. Since the 1990s, it was administered by non-political technocratic caretaker governments on four occasions, the last being under military-backed emergency rule in 2007 and 2008. The Awami League and the Bangladesh Nationalist Party (BNP) were the two most dominant political parties in Bangladesh until the July Revolution of 2024, which led to the ousting of Sheikh Hasina following mass protests and a nationwide uprising. In the aftermath, a non-partisan interim government was formed under Nobel laureate Muhammad Yunus to restore democratic governance and oversee institutional reforms. Much like the technocratic caretaker governments between 1990 and 2008, this interim administration pledged neutrality and began preparations for constitutional changes and future elections.

Bangladesh is a member of the UN, WTO, IMF, the World Bank, ADB, OIC, IDB, SAARC, BIMSTEC and the IMCTC. Bangladesh has achieved significant strides in human development compared to its neighbours.

=== Indian Bengal ===
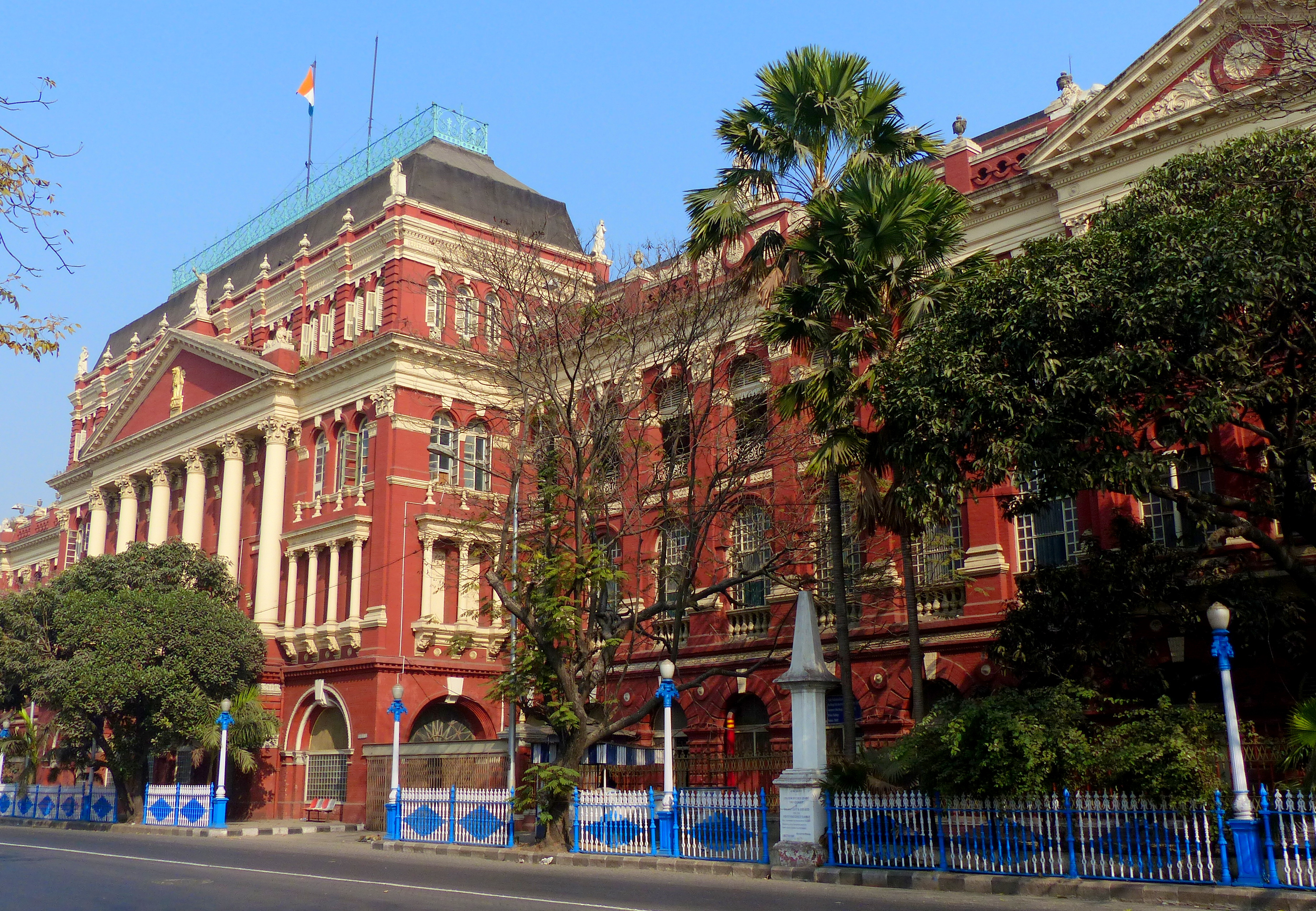
Writers' Building, the official seat of the Government of West Bengal

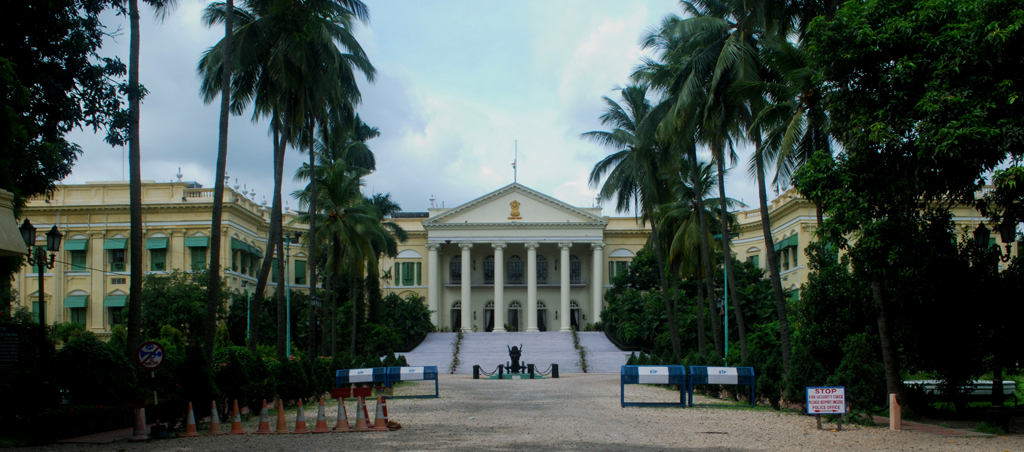
Raj Bhavan the official residence of the Governor of West Bengal, India

West Bengal is a constituent state of the Republic of India, with local executives and assemblies- features shared with other states in the Indian federal system. The president of India appoints a governor as the ceremonial representative of the union government. The governor appoints the chief minister on the nomination of the legislative assembly. The chief minister is the traditionally the leader of the party or coalition with most seats in the assembly. President's rule is often imposed in Indian states as a direct intervention of the union government led by the prime minister of India. The Bengali-speaking zone of India carries 48 seats in the lower house of India, Lok Sabha.

Each state has popularly elected members in the Indian lower house of parliament, the Lok Sabha. Each state nominates members to the Indian upper house of parliament, the Rajya Sabha.

The state legislative assemblies also play a key role in electing the ceremonial president of India. The former president of India, Pranab Mukherjee, was a native of West Bengal and a leader of the Indian National Congress. The former leader of opposition of India, Adhir Ranjan Chowdhury is from West Bengal. He has been elected from Baharampur Lok Sabha constituency.

The major political forces in the Bengali-speaking zone of India are the Left Front and the Trinamool Congress, the Indian National Congress and the Bharatiya Janata Party. The Bengali-speaking zone of India is considered stronghold for Communism in India. Bengalis are known not to vote on communal lines but in recent years this conception has how changed. The West Bengal based Trinamool Congress is now the third largest party of India in terms of number of MP or MLA after the Bharatiya Janata Party and the Indian National Congress. Earlier the Communist Party of India (Marxist) held this position.

=== Crossborder relations ===
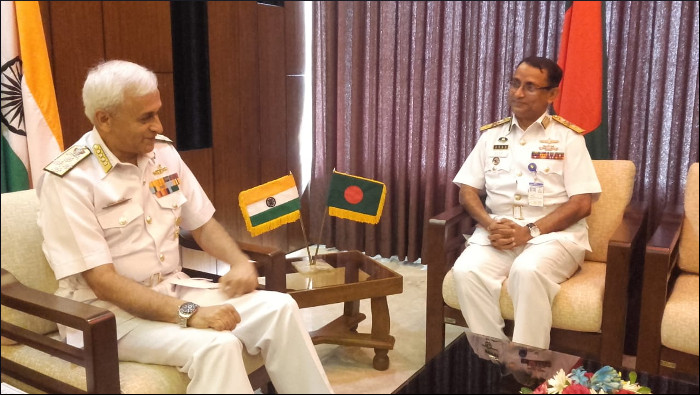
A meeting between the naval commanders of India and Bangladesh

India and Bangladesh are the world's first and eighth most populous countries respectively. Bangladesh-India relations began on a high note in 1971 when India played a major role in the liberation of Bangladesh, with the Indian Bengali populace and media providing overwhelming support to the independence movement in the former East Pakistan. The two countries had a twenty five-year friendship treaty between 1972 and 1996. However, differences over river sharing, border security and access to trade have long plagued the relationship. In more recent years, a consensus has evolved in both countries on the importance of developing good relations, as well as a strategic partnership in South Asia and beyond. Commercial, cultural and defence co-operation have expanded since 2010, when Prime Ministers Sheikh Hasina and Manmohan Singh pledged to reinvigorate ties.

The Bangladesh High Commission in New Delhi operates a Deputy High Commission in Kolkata and a consular office in Agartala. India has a High Commission in Dhaka with consulates in Chittagong and Rajshahi. Frequent international air, bus and rail services connect major cities in Bangladesh and Indian Bengal, particularly the three largest cities- Dhaka, Kolkata and Chittagong. Undocumented immigration of Bangladeshi workers is a controversial issue championed by right-wing nationalist parties in India but finds little sympathy in West Bengal. India has since fenced the border which has been criticised by Bangladesh.

== Economy ==
The total GDP of Bengal region is approximately US$730 billion, of which US$510 billion comes from Bangladesh and ₹21.48 lakh crore (US$230 billion) comes from West Bengal.
1. Bangladesh (70.0%)
2. West Bengal (30.0%)

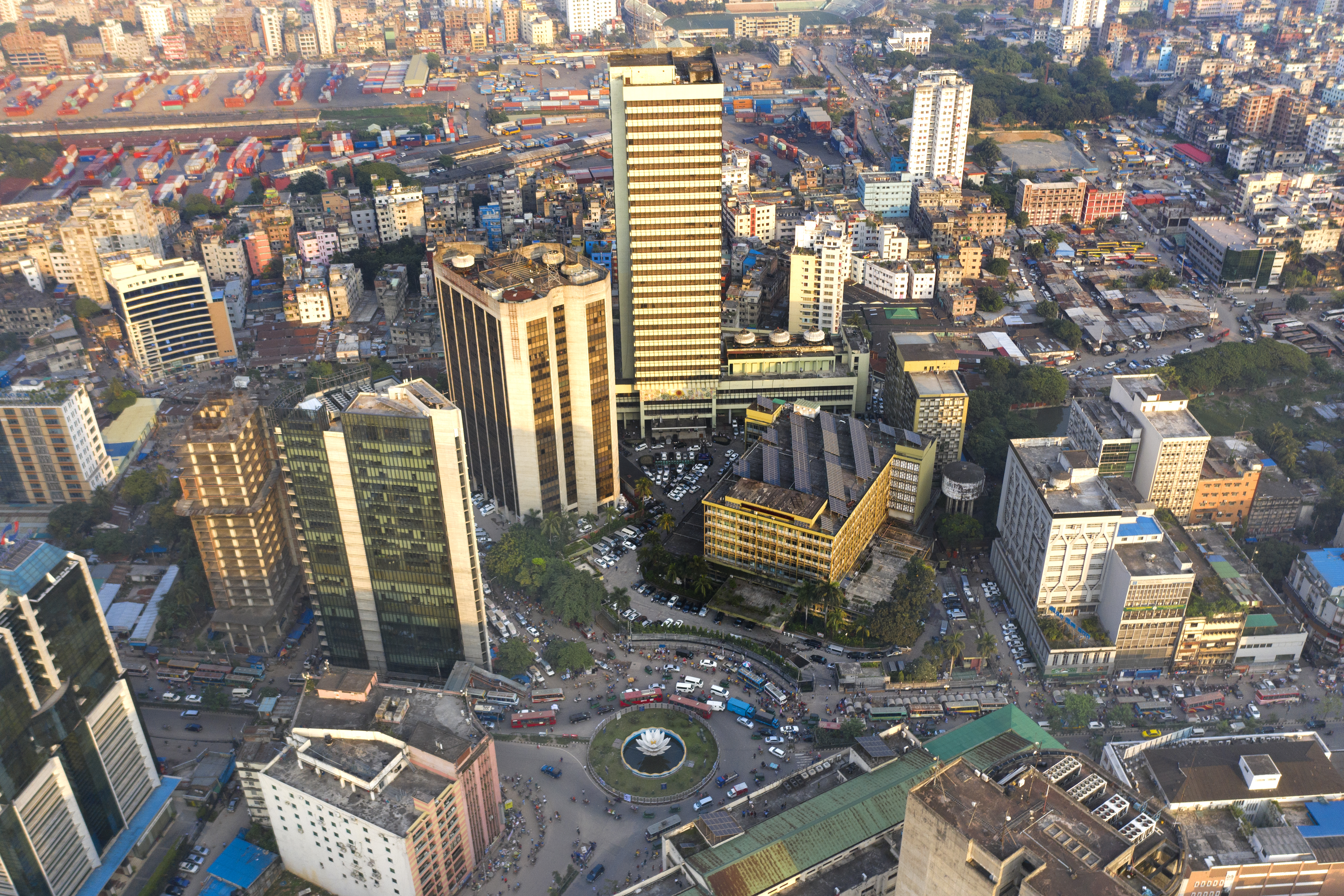
Downtown Dhaka

The Ganges Delta provided advantages of fertile soil, ample water, and an abundance of fish, wildlife, and fruit. Living standards for Bengal's elite were relatively better than other parts of South Asia. Between 400 and 1200, Bengal had a well-developed economy in terms of land ownership, agriculture, livestock, shipping, trade, commerce, taxation, and banking. The apparent vibrancy of the Bengal economy in the beginning of the 15th century is attributed to the end of tribute payments to the Delhi Sultanate, which ceased after the creation of the Bengal Sultanate and stopped the outflow of wealth. Ma Huan's travelogue recorded a booming shipbuilding industry and significant international trade in Bengal.

In 1338, Ibn Battuta noticed that the silver taka was the most popular currency in the region instead of the Islamic dinar. In 1415, members of Admiral Zheng He's entourage also noticed the dominance of the taka. The currency was the most important symbol of sovereignty for the Sultan of Bengal. The Sultanate of Bengal established an estimated 27 mints in provincial capitals across the kingdom. These provincial capitals were known as Mint Towns. These Mint Towns formed an integral aspect of governance and administration in Bengal.

The taka continued to be issued in Mughal Bengal, which inherited the sultanate's legacy. As Bengal became more prosperous and integrated into the world economy under Mughal rule, the taka replaced shell currency in rural areas and became the standardised legal tender. It was also used in commerce with the Dutch East India Company, the French East India Company, the Danish East India Company and the British East India Company. Under Mughal rule, Bengal was the centre of the worldwide muslin trade. The muslin trade in Bengal was patronised by the Mughal imperial court. Muslin from Bengal was worn by aristocratic ladies in courts as far away as Europe, Persia and Central Asia. The treasury of the Nawab of Bengal was the biggest source of revenue for the imperial Mughal court in Delhi. Bengal had a large shipbuilding industry. The shipbuilding output of Bengal during the 16th and 17th centuries stood at 223,250 tons annually, which was higher than the volume of shipbuilding in the nineteen colonies of North America between 1769 and 1771.

Historically, Bengal has been the industrial leader of the subcontinent. Mughal Bengal saw the emergence of a proto-industrial economy backed up by textiles and gunpowder. The organised early modern economy flourished till the beginning of British rule in the mid 18th-century, when the region underwent radical and revolutionary changes in government, trade, and regulation. The British displaced the indigenous ruling class and transferred much of the region's wealth back to the colonial metropole in Britain. In the 19th century, the British began investing in railways and limited industrialisation. However, the Bengali economy was dominated by trade in raw materials during much of the colonial period, particularly the jute trade.

The partition of India changed the economic geography of the region. Calcutta in West Bengal inherited a thriving industrial base from the colonial period, particularly in terms of jute processing. East Pakistan soon developed its industrial base, including the world's largest jute mill. In 1972, the newly independent government of Bangladesh nationalised 580 industrial plants. These industries were later privatised in the late 1970s as Bangladesh moved towards a market-oriented economy. Liberal reforms in 1991 paved the way for a major expansion of Bangladesh's private sector industry, including in telecoms, natural gas, textiles, pharmaceuticals, ceramics, steel and shipbuilding. In 2022, Bangladesh was the second largest economy in South Asia after India.

The region is one of the largest rice producing areas in the world, with West Bengal being India's largest rice producer and Bangladesh being the world's fourth largest rice producer. Three Bengali economists have been Nobel laureates, including Amartya Sen and Abhijit Banerjee who won the Nobel Memorial Prize in Economics and Muhammad Yunus who won the Nobel Peace Prize.

Bengal	Real economy (nominal GDP per capita) in 2026–2027)	Nominal economy (nominal GDP in 2026–2027)	Population (2025)
Bangladesh's Dhaka (Dhaka Municipal Corporation Area)	$5,000	$70 billion	3.7 crore
West Bengal's Kolkata District (Kolkata Municipal Corporation Area)	$4,400	$20 billion	2.2 crore
Bangladesh (East Bengal)	$2,911	US$510 billion	17.5 crore (more than 17.3 crore Bengalis)
India's West Bengal	₹202,700 (US$2,200) (Note: Based on an estimated population of 106 million for West Bengal in 2026, the per capita figure has been calculated approximately.)	₹21.48 lakh crore (US$230 billion)	10 crore (around 8-8.5 crore Bengalis)

=== Stock markets ===
- Dhaka Stock Exchange
- Chittagong Stock Exchange
- Calcutta Stock Exchange

=== Ports and harbours ===
- Port of Chittagong
- Port of Kolkata
- Port of Mongla
- Port of Haldia
- Port of Payra
- Port of Pangaon
- Port of Khulna
- Port of Farakka
- Port of Narayanganj
- Port of Ashuganj
- Port of Barisal
- Matarbari Port
- Land port of Benapole-Petrapole

=== Chambers of commerce ===
- Bengal Chamber of Commerce and Industry
- Bengal National Chamber of Commerce & Industry
- Federation of Bangladesh Chambers of Commerce and Industry (FBCCI)
- Chittagong Chamber of Commerce & Industry
- Dhaka Chamber of Commerce & Industry (DCCI)
- Metropolitan Chamber of Commerce and Industry (MCCI)

=== Intra-Bengal trade ===
Bangladesh and India are the largest trading partners in South Asia, with two-way trade valued at an estimated US$16 billion. Most of this trade relationship is centred on some of the world's busiest land ports on the Bangladesh-India border. The Bangladesh Bhutan India Nepal Initiative seeks to boost trade through a Regional Motor Vehicles Agreement.

== Demographics ==
=== Language ===
Language in Bengal
1. Bengali (92.0%)
2. Others (8.00%)

The Bengal region is one of the most densely populated areas in the world. With a population of 300 million, Bengalis are the third largest ethnic group in the world after the Han Chinese and Arabs. (Note: Roughly 163 million in Bangladesh and 100 million in the Republic of India (CIA Factbook 2014 estimates, numbers subject to rapid population growth); about 3 million Bangladeshis in the Middle East, 1 million Bengalis in Pakistan, 0.4 million British Bangladeshi.) According to provisional results of 2011 Bangladesh census, the population of Bangladesh was 149,772,364; however, CIA's The World Factbook gives 163,654,860 as its population in a July 2013 estimate. According to the provisional results of the 2011 Indian national census, West Bengal has a population of 91,347,736. "So, the Bengal region, as of 2011, has at least 241.1 million people. This figures give a population density of 1003.9/km^{2}; making it among the most densely populated areas in the world.

Bengali is the main language spoken in Bengal. Many phonological, lexical, and structural differences from the standard variety occur in peripheral varieties of Bengali across the region. Other regional languages closely related to standard Bengali include Sylheti, Chittagonian, Chakma, Rangpuri/Kamtapuri, Rajbanshi, Surjapuri, Hajong, Noakhali, Rohingya, and Tangchangya.

In addition, several minority ethnolinguistic groups are native to the region. These include speakers of other Indo-Aryan languages (e.g., Bishnupriya Manipuri, Mal Paharia, Nepali, Odia, Assamese, Urdu, Oraon Sadri, various Bihari languages), Tibeto-Burman languages (e.g., A'Tong, Chak, Koch, Garo, Megam, Meitei (officially called "Manipuri"), Mizo, Mru, Pangkhua, Rakhine/Marma, Kok Borok, Riang, Tippera, Usoi, various Chin languages), Austroasiatic languages (e.g., Khasi, Koda, Mundari, Pnar, Santali, War, Mahali), and Dravidian languages (e.g., Kurukh, Sauria Paharia, Telugu).

According to the 2011 Indian census, 18% of the Bengali-speakers are bilingual of whom half can speak Hindi, and 5% are trilingual.

=== Religion ===
Religions in the Bengal Region
1. Bengali Muslims~ (70.0%)
2. Bengali Hindus~ (28.0%)
3. Bengali Buddhists< (1.00%)
4. Bengali Christians< (1.00%)

In general, Bengalis are followers of Islam, Hinduism, Christianity and Buddhism with a significant number are Irreligious.

Population trends for major religious groups in the Bengal region (West Bengal and Bangladesh) under the British India (1881–1941)
Religious group	Population % 1881	Population % 1891	Population % 1901	Population % 1911	Population % 1921	Population % 1931	Population % 1941
Islam	50.16%	50.7%	51.58%	52.74%	53.99%	54.87%	54.73%
Hinduism	48.45%	47.27%	46.60%	44.80%	43.27%	43.04%	41.55%
Christianity	0.2%	–	–	–	–	–	–
Buddhism	0.69%	–	–	–	–	–	–
Other religions	0.5%	–	–	–	–	–	-

Bengal region religious diversity as per 2011 census & 2026 est.
Religion	Population
Muslims	~215-220 million (2026 est.) (Note: Bangladesh: ~160 million, (Note: 2022 census & 2024 World Bank Report (Note: The number of Bangladeshis worldwide exceeds 190 million. Nearly 15 million Bangladeshis live outside Bangladesh and are not included during national census counts. Considering the total number of Bengalis to be around 270–280 million, Bangladeshis constitute approximately 67–70% of the global Bengali population.)) India: ~36 million, (Note: (Note: The estimated population of India in 2026 is about 1.48 billion, of which approximately 8% are Bengalis. Approximately 30% of them are Bengali Muslims.)) Others: ~15-17 million (2026 est.))
Hindus	~95-97 million (2026 est.) (Note: India: ~82 million, (Note: The estimated population of India in 2026 is about 1.48 billion, of which approximately 8% are Bengalis. Approximately 70% of them are Bengali Hindus.) Bangladesh: ~15 million (Note: Bangladesh's population is expected to be around 180 million in 2026. Approximately 7.95% of the population follows Hinduism.) (2026 est.))
Christians	1,718,887
Buddhists	1,278,871
Other or no religion	1,707,917
Total	~315 million

Life expectancy is around 72.49 years for Bangladesh and 70.2 for West Bengal. In terms of literacy, West Bengal leads with 77% literacy rate, in Bangladesh the rate is approximately 72.9%. (Note: CRI do not give a breakdown by gender or state the age bracket for the data) The level of poverty in West Bengal is at 19.98%, while in Bangladesh it stands at 12.9%

West Bengal has one of the lowest total fertility rates in India. West Bengal's TFR of 1.6 roughly equals that of Canada.

=== Major cities ===
The Bengal region is home to some of the world's major urban areas, Dhaka is the 4th largest urban area in the world, while Kolkata is 17th largest urban area.

List of million plus urban areas of Bengal
Rank	City	Country	Population (2025)	Image
1	Dhaka	Bangladesh	36.6 million	Dhaka
2	Kolkata	India	22.5 million	Kolkata
3	Chittagong	Bangladesh	5,653,000	Chittagong
4	Asansol	India	1,565,000	Asansol
5	Siliguri	India	1,191,000	Siliguri

==== Other major cities in West Bengal ====
Other important cities of West Bengal region such as Howrah, Kalyani, Basirhat, Kharagpur, Durgapur, Cooch Behar, Malda, Chandannagar, Bardhaman, Darjeeling, Jalpaiguri, Suri, Murshidabad, Krishnanagar, Behrampore, Barrackpore, Bankura, Purulia, Alipore, Nabadwip, Barasat, Medinipur, Tamluk, Bishnupur, Baruipur, etc.

==== Other major cities in Bangladesh ====
Other important cities in Bangladesh such as Sylhet, Khulna, Jessore, Rajshahi, Rangpur, Comilla, Barisal, Cox's Bazar, Maijdee, Mymensingh, Bogra, Dinajpur, Tangail, Tongi, Gazipur, Narayanganj, Savar, Kushtia, Sirajganj, Brahmanbaria, Feni, Narsingdi, Faridpur, Saidpur, Sreepur, etc.

== Culture ==
=== Language ===
Bengali letters

The Bengali language developed between the 7th and 10th centuries from Apabhraṃśa and Magadhi Prakrit. It is written using the indigenous Bengali alphabet, a descendant of the ancient Brahmi script. Bengali is the 5th most spoken language in the world. It is an eastern Indo-Aryan language and one of the easternmost branches of the Indo-European language family. It is part of the Bengali-Assamese languages. Bengali has greatly influenced other languages in the region, including Odia, Assamese, Chakma, Nepali and Rohingya. It is the sole state language of Bangladesh and the second most spoken language in India. It is also the seventh most spoken language by total number of speakers in the world.

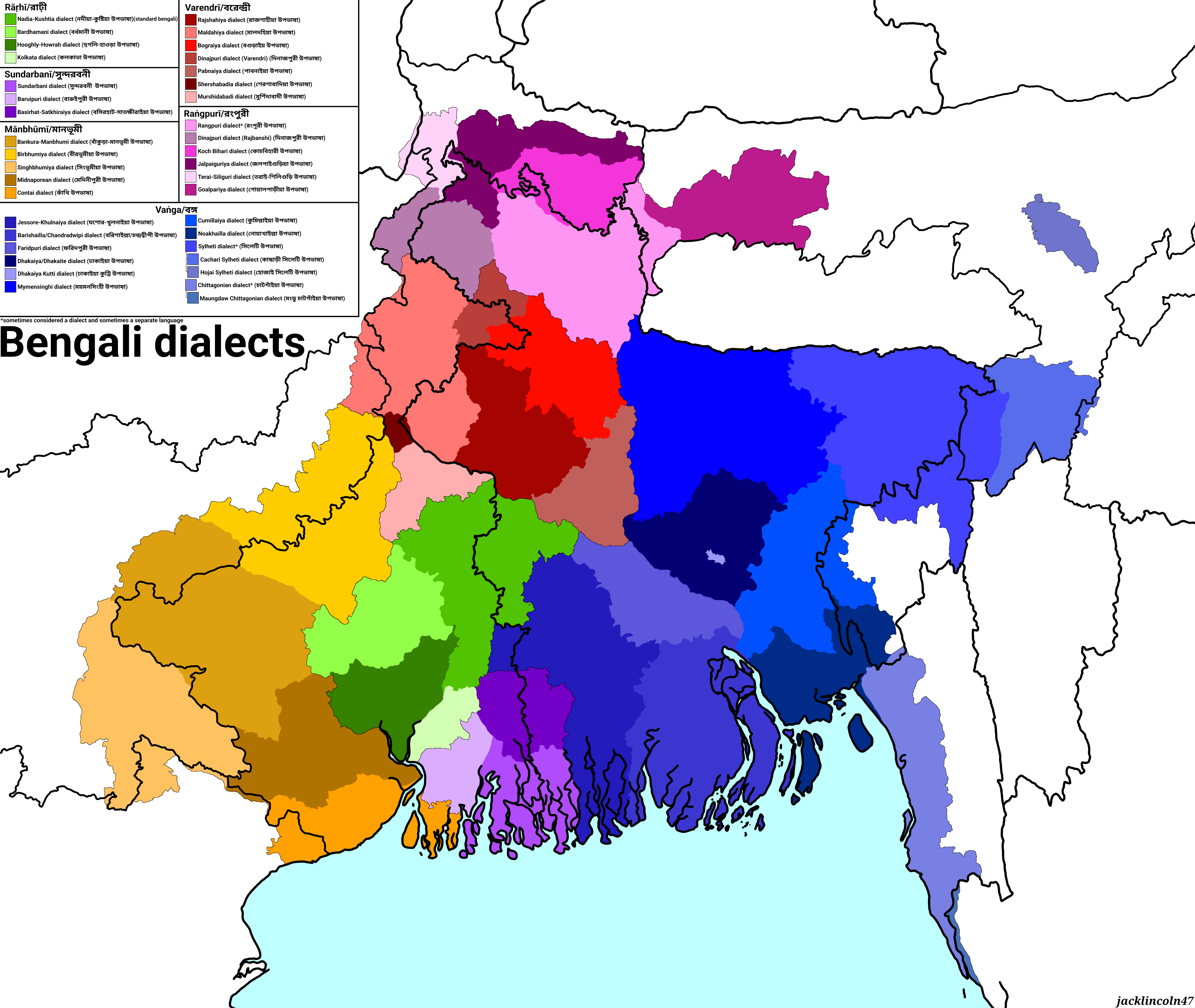
Bengali and its dialects

Bengali binds together a culturally diverse region and is an important contributor to regional identity. The 1952 Bengali language movement in East Pakistan is commemorated by UNESCO as International Mother Language Day, as part of global efforts to preserve linguistic identity.

=== Currency ===
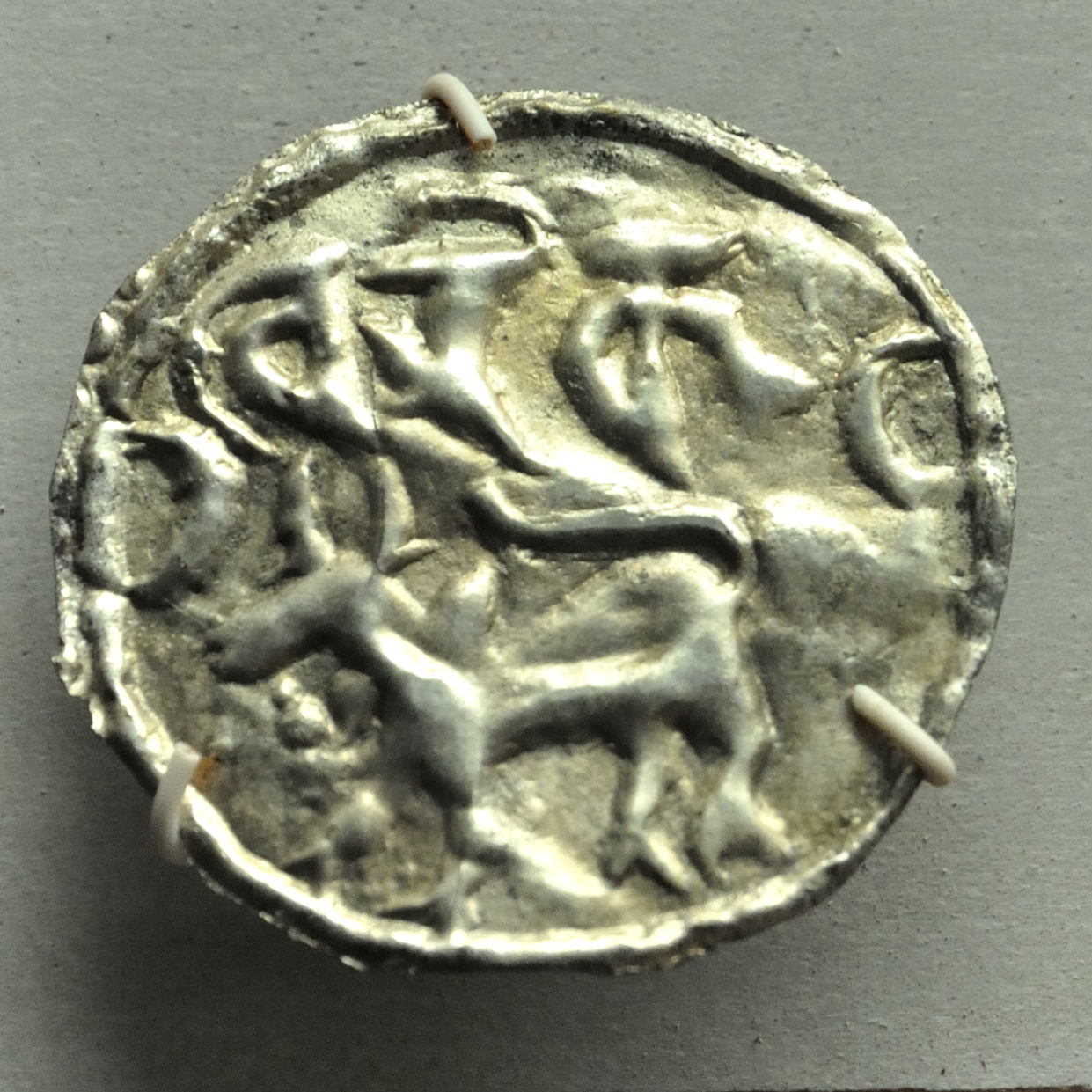
A silver coin with Proto-Bengali script, 9th century

In both Bangladesh and West Bengal, currency is commonly denominated as taka. The Bangladesh taka is an official standard bearer of this tradition, while the Indian rupee is also written as taka in Bengali script on all of its banknotes. The history of the taka dates back centuries. Bengal was home one of the world's earliest coin currencies in the first millennium BCE. Under the Delhi Sultanate, the taka was introduced by Muhammad bin Tughluq in 1329. Bengal became the stronghold of the taka. The silver currency was the most important symbol of sovereignty of the Sultanate of Bengal. It was traded on the Silk Road and replicated in Nepal and China's Tibetan protectorate. The Pakistani rupee was scripted in Bengali as taka on its banknotes until Bangladesh's creation in 1971.

=== Literature ===
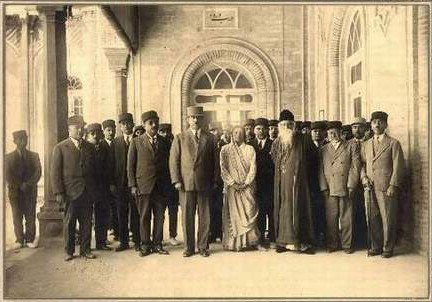
Rabindranath Tagore, known as the Bengali Shakespeare, being hosted at the Parliament of Iran in the 1930s

Bengali literature has a rich heritage. It has a history stretching back to the 3rd century BCE, when the main language was Sanskrit written in the brahmi script. The Bengali language and script evolved c. 1000 CE from Magadhi Prakrit. Bengal has a long tradition in folk literature, evidenced by the Chôrjapôdô, Mangalkavya, Shreekrishna Kirtana, Maimansingha Gitika or Thakurmar Jhuli. Bengali literature in the medieval age was often either religious (e.g. Chandidas), or adaptations from other languages (e.g. Alaol). During the Bengal Renaissance of the nineteenth and twentieth centuries, Bengali literature was modernised through the works of authors such as Michael Madhusudan Dutta, Ishwar Chandra Vidyasagar, Bankim Chandra Chattopadhyay, Rabindranath Tagore, Sarat Chandra Chattopadhyay, Kazi Nazrul Islam, Satyendranath Dutta, Begum Rokeya and Jibanananda Das. In the 20th century, prominent modern Bengali writers included Syed Mujtaba Ali, Jasimuddin, Manik Bandopadhyay, Tarasankar Bandyopadhyay, Bibhutibhushan Bandyopadhyay, Buddhadeb Bose, Sunil Gangopadhyay and Humayun Ahmed.

Prominent contemporary Bengali writers in English include Amitav Ghosh, Tahmima Anam, Jhumpa Lahiri and Zia Haider Rahman among others.

=== Personification ===
The Bangamata is a female personification of Bengal which was created during the Bengali Renaissance and later adopted by the Bengali nationalists. Hindu nationalists adopted a modified Bharat Mata as a national personification of India. The Mother Bengal represents not only biological motherness but its attributed characteristics as well – protection, never ending love, consolation, care, the beginning and the end of life. In Amar Sonar Bangla, the national anthem of Bangladesh, Rabindranath Tagore has used the word "Maa" (Mother) numerous times to refer to the motherland i.e. Bengal.

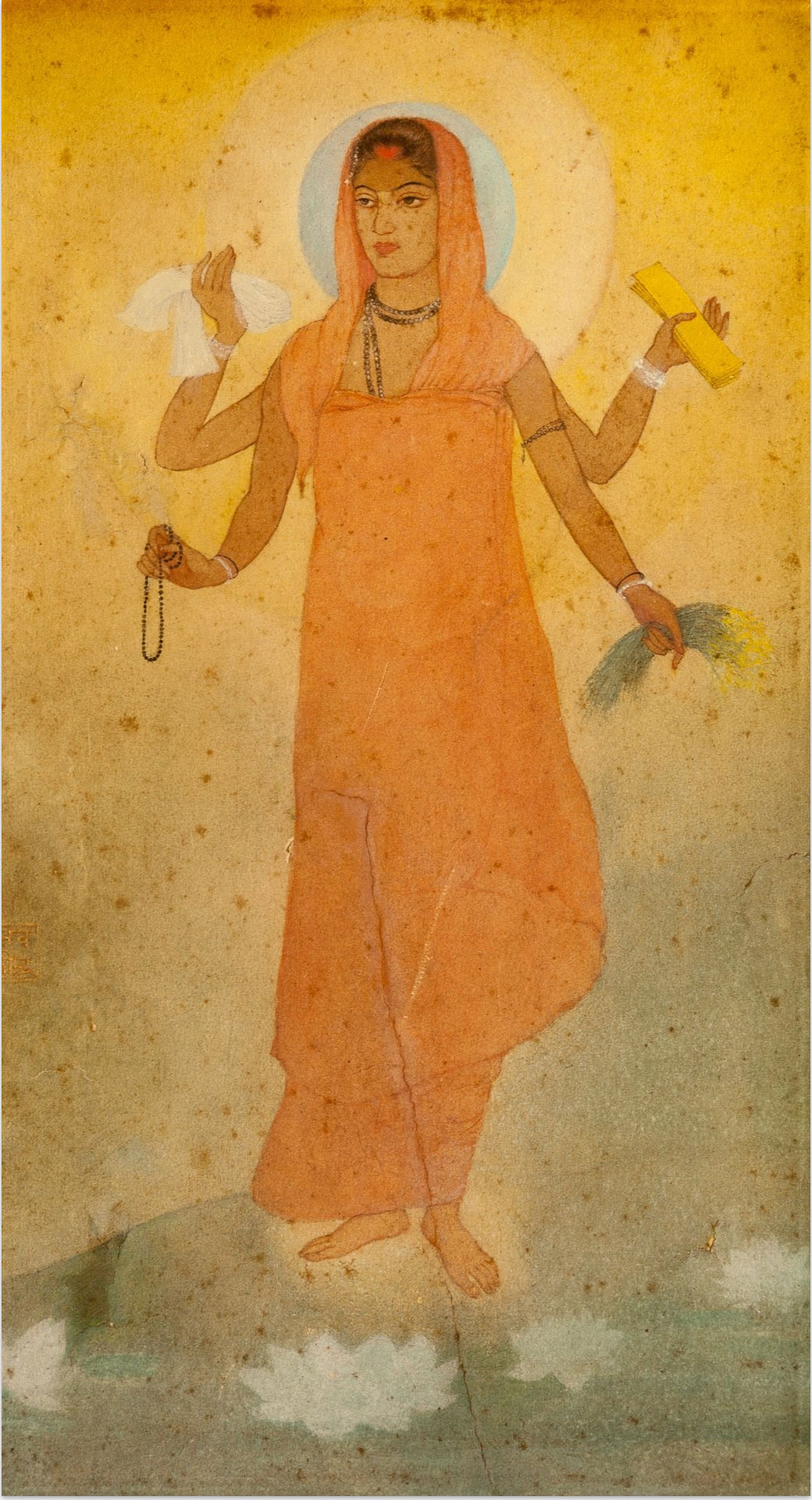
The nationalist sentiments that this painting evoked transformed Abanindranath Tagore's initial thoughts "Bangamata" after the Partition of Bengal (1905) into Bharat Mata (Mother India), a pan-Indian figure, inspiring people across the length and breadth of the nation during the Indian independence movement.

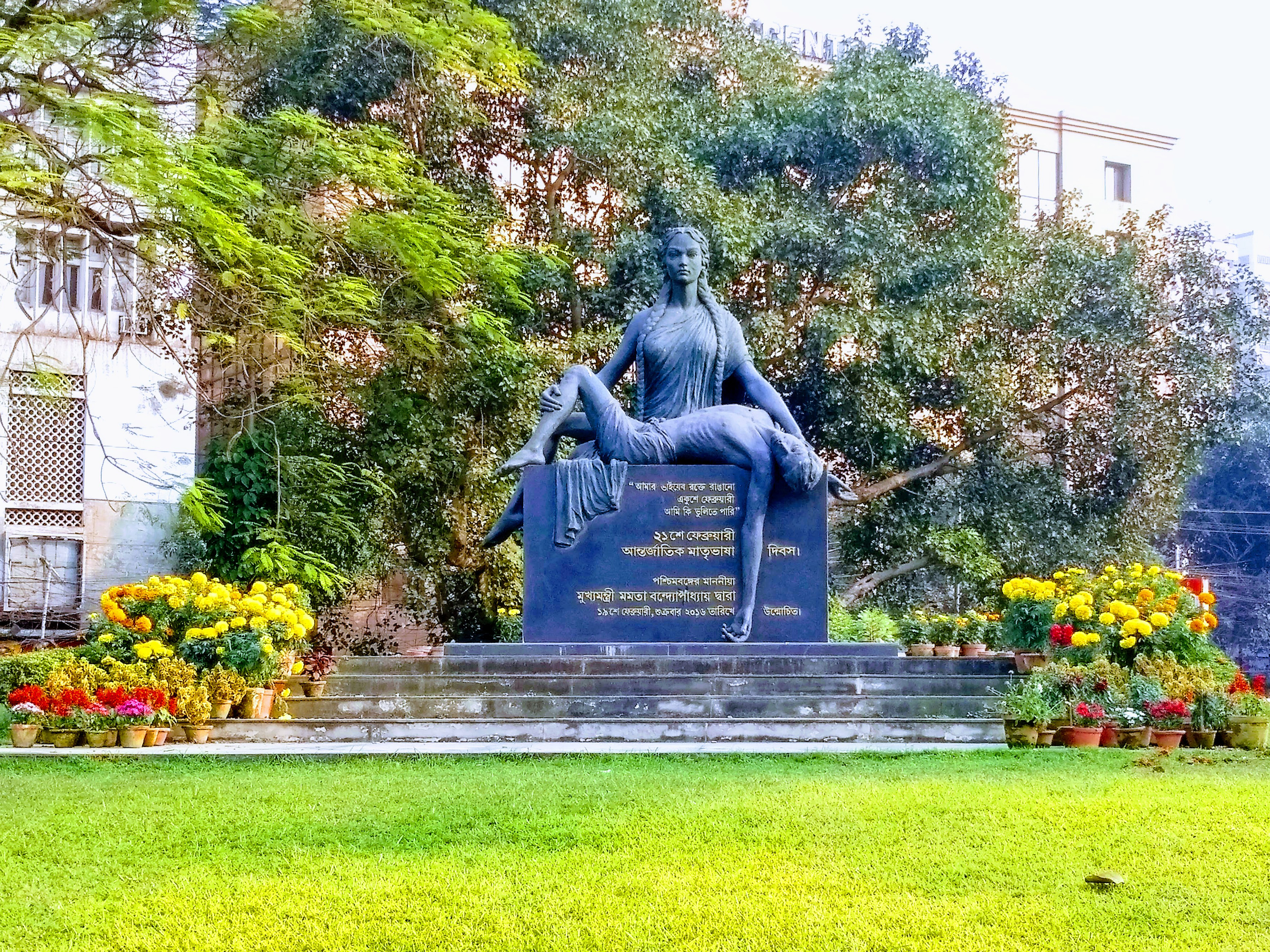
Mother Language Day Monument in Kolkata, West Bengal representing Language Matyrs on the lap of Bangamata (Mother Bengal) during Bangladesh Liberation War.

=== Art ===
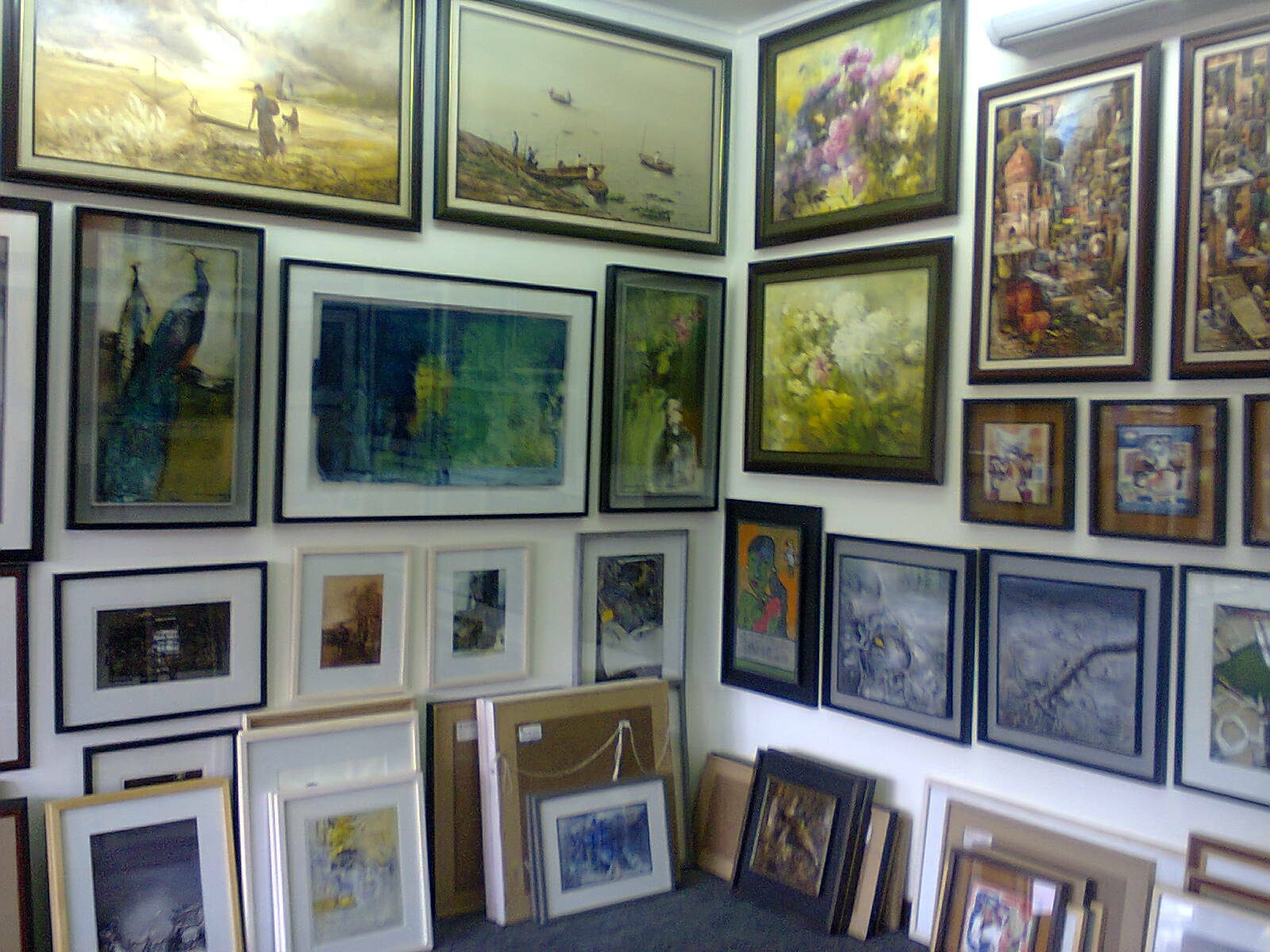
Bangladeshi paintings for sale at an art gallery in Dhaka

The Pala-Sena School of Art developed in Bengal between the 8th and 12th centuries and is considered a high point of classical Asian art. It included sculptures and paintings.

Islamic Bengal was noted for its production of the finest cotton fabrics and saris, notably the Jamdani, which received warrants from the Mughal court. Zainul Abedin was the pioneer of modern Bangladeshi art. The country has a thriving and internationally acclaimed contemporary art scene.

=== Architecture ===
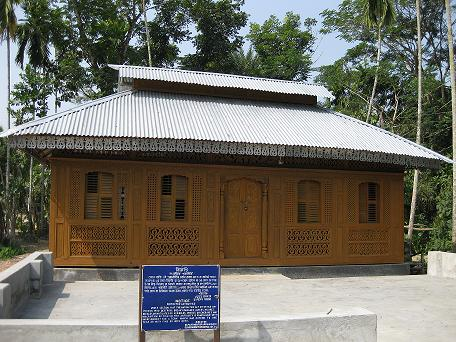
Bungalows originated from Bengali architecture.

Classical Bengali architecture features terracotta buildings. Ancient Bengali kingdoms laid the foundations of the region's architectural heritage through the construction of monasteries and temples (for example, the Somapura Mahavihara). During the sultanate period, a distinct and glorious Islamic style of architecture developed the region. Most Islamic buildings were small and highly artistic terracotta mosques with multiple domes and no minarets. Bengal was also home to the largest mosque in South Asia at Adina. Bengali vernacular architecture is credited for inspiring the popularity of the bungalow.

The Bengal region also has a rich heritage of Indo-Saracenic architecture, including numerous zamindar palaces and mansions. The most prominent example of this style is the Victoria Memorial, Kolkata.

In the 1950s, Muzharul Islam pioneered the modernist terracotta style of architecture in South Asia. This was followed by the design of the Jatiyo Sangshad Bhaban by the renowned American architect Louis Kahn in the 1960s, which was based on the aesthetic heritage of Bengali architecture and geography.

=== Sciences ===
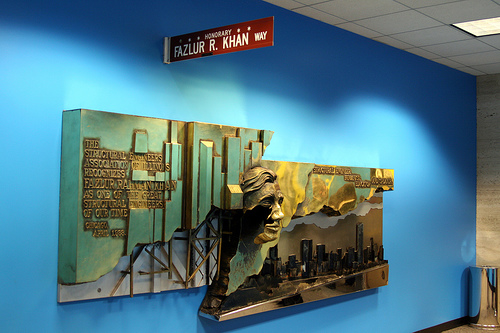
A sculpture of the Bengali-American engineer Fazlur Rahman Khan at Sears Tower in the United States

The Gupta dynasty, which is believed to have originated in North Bengal, pioneered the invention of chess, the concept of zero, the theory of Earth orbiting the Sun, the study of solar and lunar eclipses and the flourishing of Sanskrit literature and drama.

The educational reforms during the British Raj gave birth to many distinguished scientists in Bengal. Sir Jagadish Chandra Bose pioneered the investigation of radio and microwave optics, made significant contributions to plant science, and laid the foundations of experimental science South Asia. IEEE named him one of the fathers of radio science. He was the first person from the South Asia to receive a US patent, in 1904. In 1924–25, while researching at the University of Dhaka, Satyendra Nath Bose well known for his works in quantum mechanics, provided the foundation for Bose–Einstein statistics and the theory of the Bose–Einstein condensate. Meghnad Saha was the first scientist to relate a star's spectrum to its temperature, developing thermal ionization equations (notably the Saha ionization equation) that have been foundational in the fields of astrophysics and astrochemistry. Amal Kumar Raychaudhuri was a physicist, known for his research in general relativity and cosmology. His most significant contribution is the eponymous Raychaudhuri equation, which demonstrates that singularities arise inevitably in general relativity and is a key ingredient in the proofs of the Penrose–Hawking singularity theorems.

In the United States, the Bangladeshi-American engineer Fazlur Rahman Khan emerged as the "father of tubular designs" in skyscraper construction. Ashoke Sen is an Indian theoretical physicist whose main area of work is string theory. He was among the first recipients of the Fundamental Physics Prize "for opening the path to the realisation that all string theories are different limits of the same underlying theory".

=== Music ===
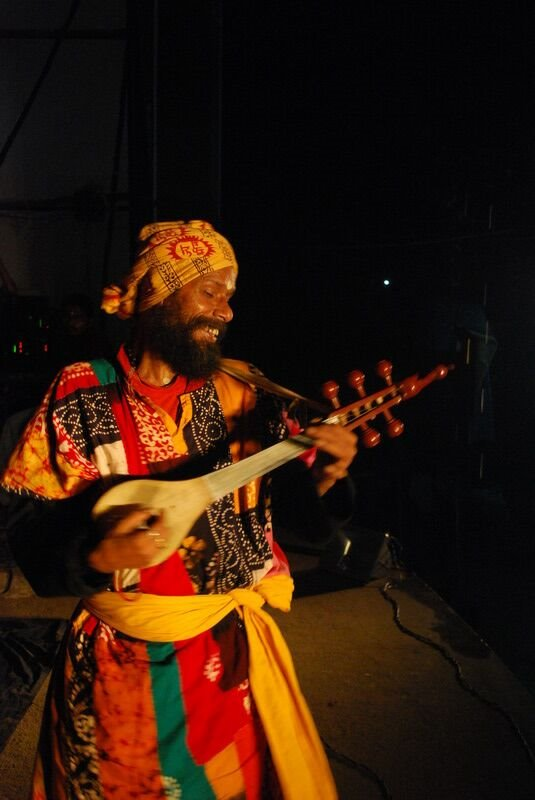
A Baul musician. The Baul ballads of Bangladesh are classified by UNESCO as intangible cultural heritage.

The Baul tradition is a unique heritage of Bengali folk music. The 19th century mystic poet Lalon Shah is the most celebrated practitioner of the tradition. Other folk music forms include Gombhira, Bhatiali and Bhawaiya. Hason Raja is a renowned folk poet of the Sylhet region. Folk music in Bengal is often accompanied by the ektara, a one-stringed instrument. Other instruments include the dotara, dhol, flute, and tabla. The region also has a rich heritage in North Indian classical music.

=== Cuisine ===
Bengali cuisine is the only traditionally developed multi-course tradition from South Asia. Rice and fish are traditional favourite foods, leading to a saying that "fish and rice make a Bengali". Bengal's vast repertoire of fish-based dishes includes Hilsa preparations, a favourite among Bengalis. Bengalis make distinctive sweetmeats from milk products, including Rôshogolla, Chômchôm, and several kinds of Pithe. The old city of Dhaka is noted for its distinct Indo-Islamic cuisine, including biryani, bakarkhani and kebab dishes.

=== Boats ===
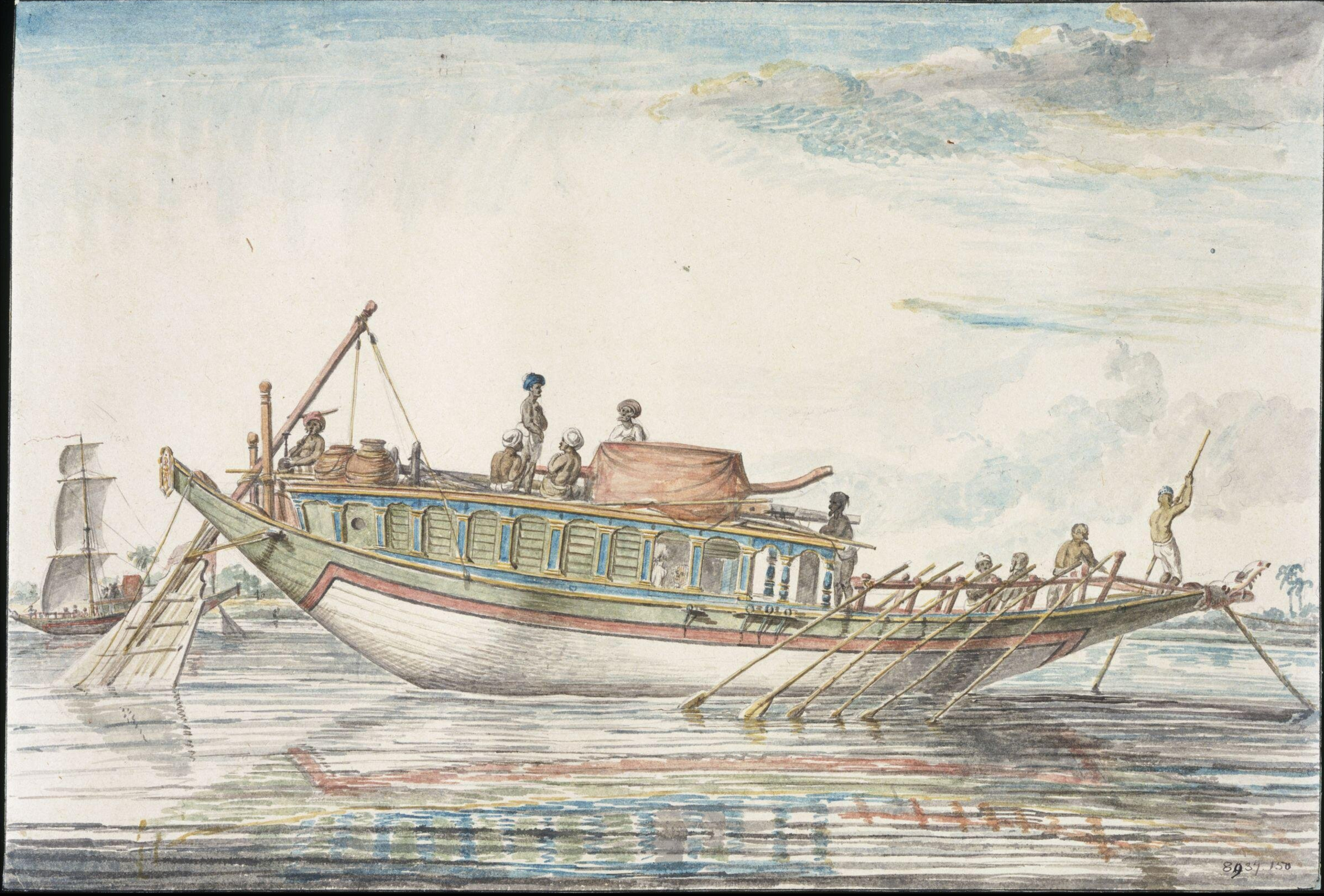
18th-century painting of a budgerow

There are 150 types of Bengali country boats plying the 700 rivers of the Bengal delta, the vast floodplain and many oxbow lakes. They vary in design and size. The boats include the dinghy and sampan among others. Country boats are a central element of Bengali culture and have inspired generations of artists and poets, including the ivory artisans of the Mughal era. The country has a long shipbuilding tradition, dating back many centuries. Wooden boats are made of timber such as Jarul (dipterocarpus turbinatus), sal (shorea robusta), sundari (heritiera fomes), and Burma teak (tectons grandis). Medieval Bengal was shipbuilding hub for the Mughal and Ottoman navies. The British Royal Navy later utilised Bengali shipyards in the 19th century, including for the Battle of Trafalgar.

=== Attire ===
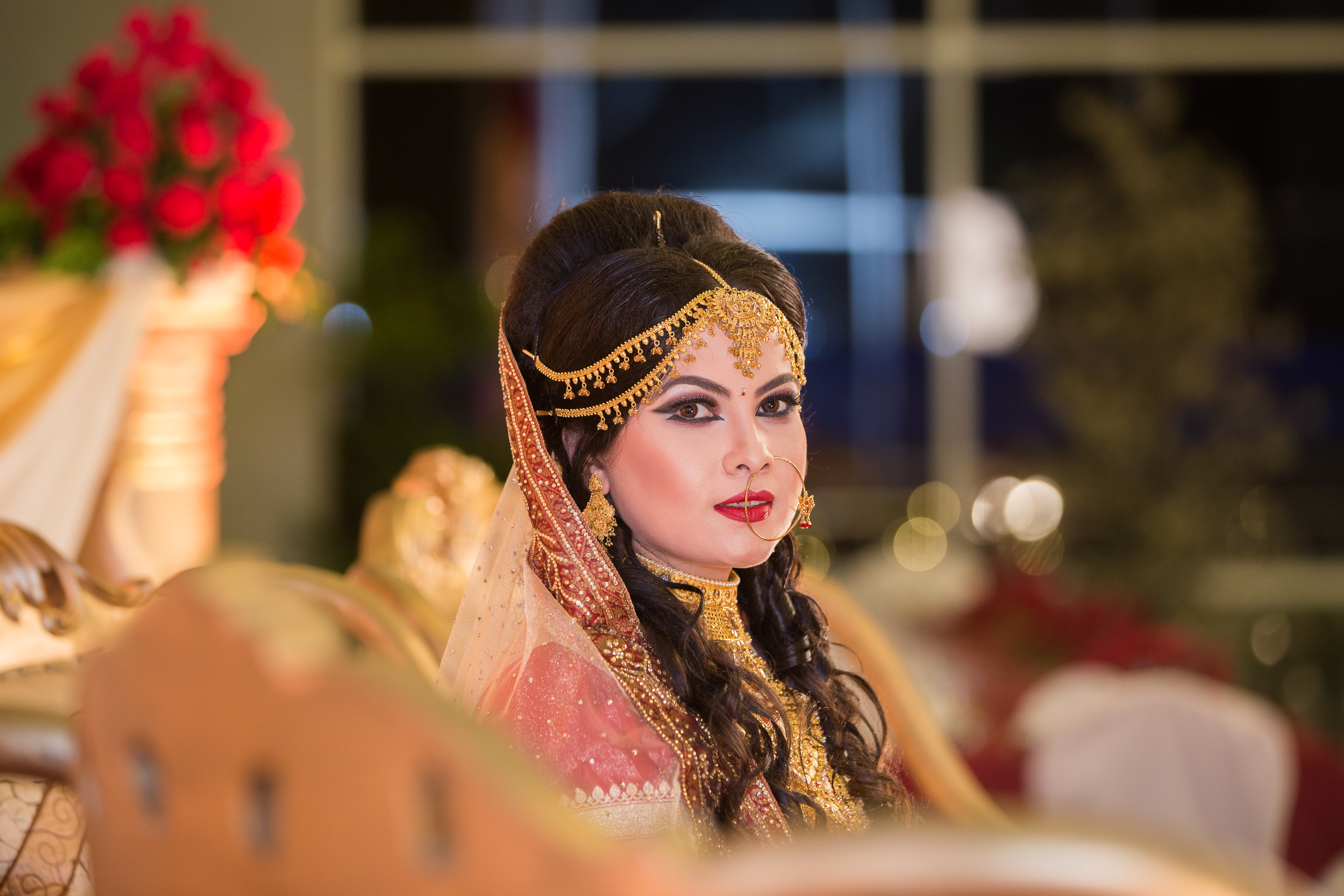
Traditional bride of Bangladesh

Bengali women commonly wear the shaŗi, often distinctly designed according to local cultural customs. In urban areas, many women and men wear Western-style attire. Among men, European dressing has greater acceptance. Men also wear traditional costumes such as the panjabi with dhoti or pyjama, often on religious occasions. The lungi, a kind of long skirt, is widely worn by Bangladeshi men.

=== Festivals ===
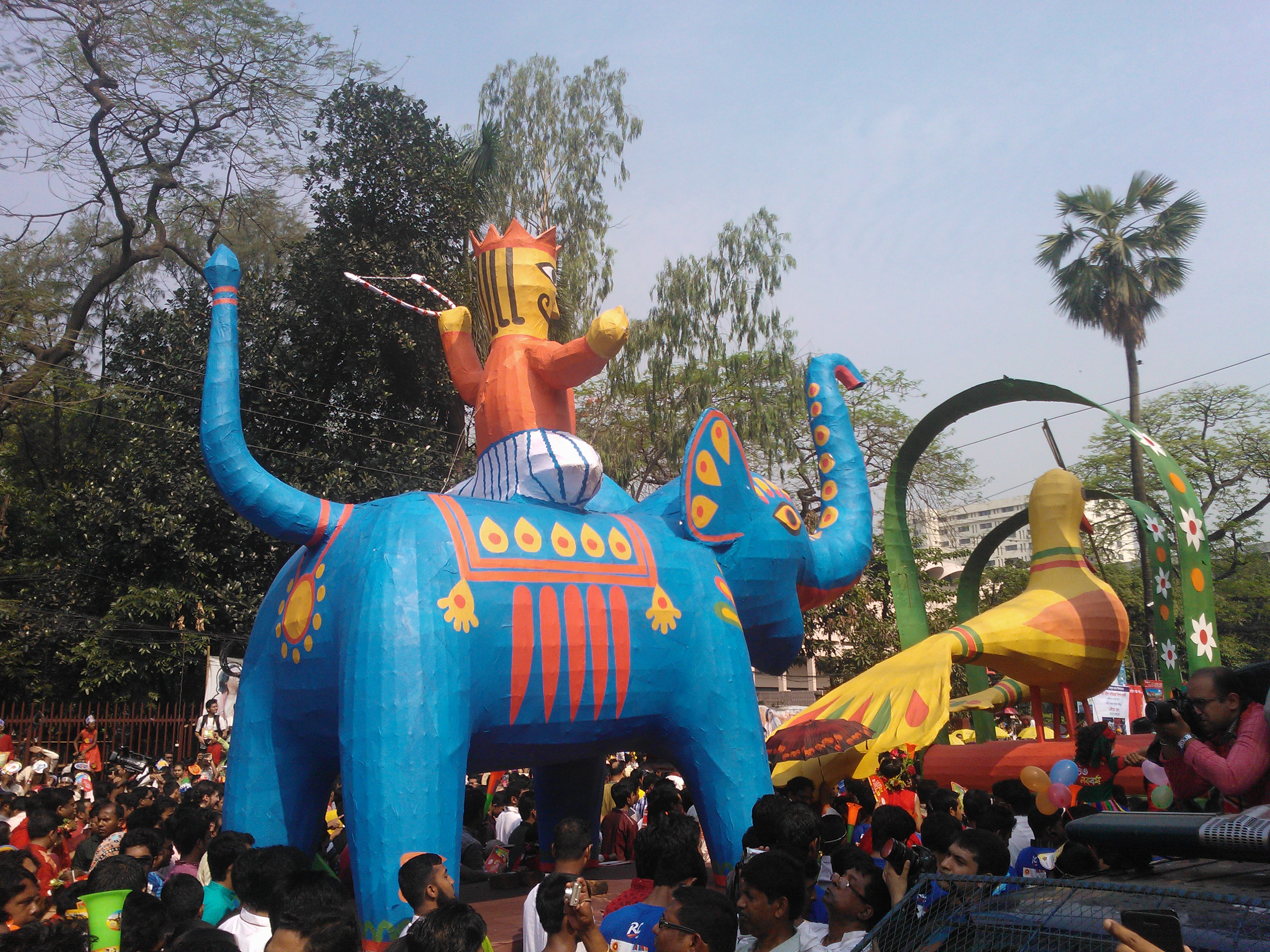
Mangal Shobhajatra parade during the Bengali New Year in Bangladesh

For Bengali Muslims, the major religious festivals are Eid al-Fitr, Eid al-Adha, Mawlid, Muharram, and Shab-e-Barat. For Bengali Hindus, the major religious festivals include Durga Puja, Kali Puja, Janmashtami and Rath Yatra. In honour of Bengali Buddhists and Bengali Christians, both Buddha's Birthday and Christmas are public holidays in the region. The Bengali New Year is the main secular festival of Bengali culture celebrated by people regardless of religious and social backgrounds. The biggest congregation in Bengal is the Bishwa ijtema, which is also the world's second largest Islamic congregation. Other Bengali festivals include the first day of spring and the Nabanna harvest festival in autumn.

=== Media ===
Bangladesh has a diverse, outspoken and privately owned press. English-language titles are popular in the urban readership. West Bengal had 559 published newspapers in 2005, of which 430 were in Bengali, with the largest circulated Bengali language newspapers and magazines in the world. Bengali cinema is divided between the media hubs of Dhaka and Kolkata.

=== Sports ===
Cricket and football are popular sports in the Bengal region. Local games include sports such as Kho Kho and Kabaddi, the latter being the national sport of Bangladesh. An Indo-Bangladesh Bengali Games has been organised among the athletes of the Bengali speaking areas of the two countries.

== See also ==
- Bangladeshi diaspora
- List of Bengalis
- Zerat
