= Rajiuddin Ahmed Raju =

Bangladeshi politician

- রাজিউদ্দিন আহমেদ রাজু
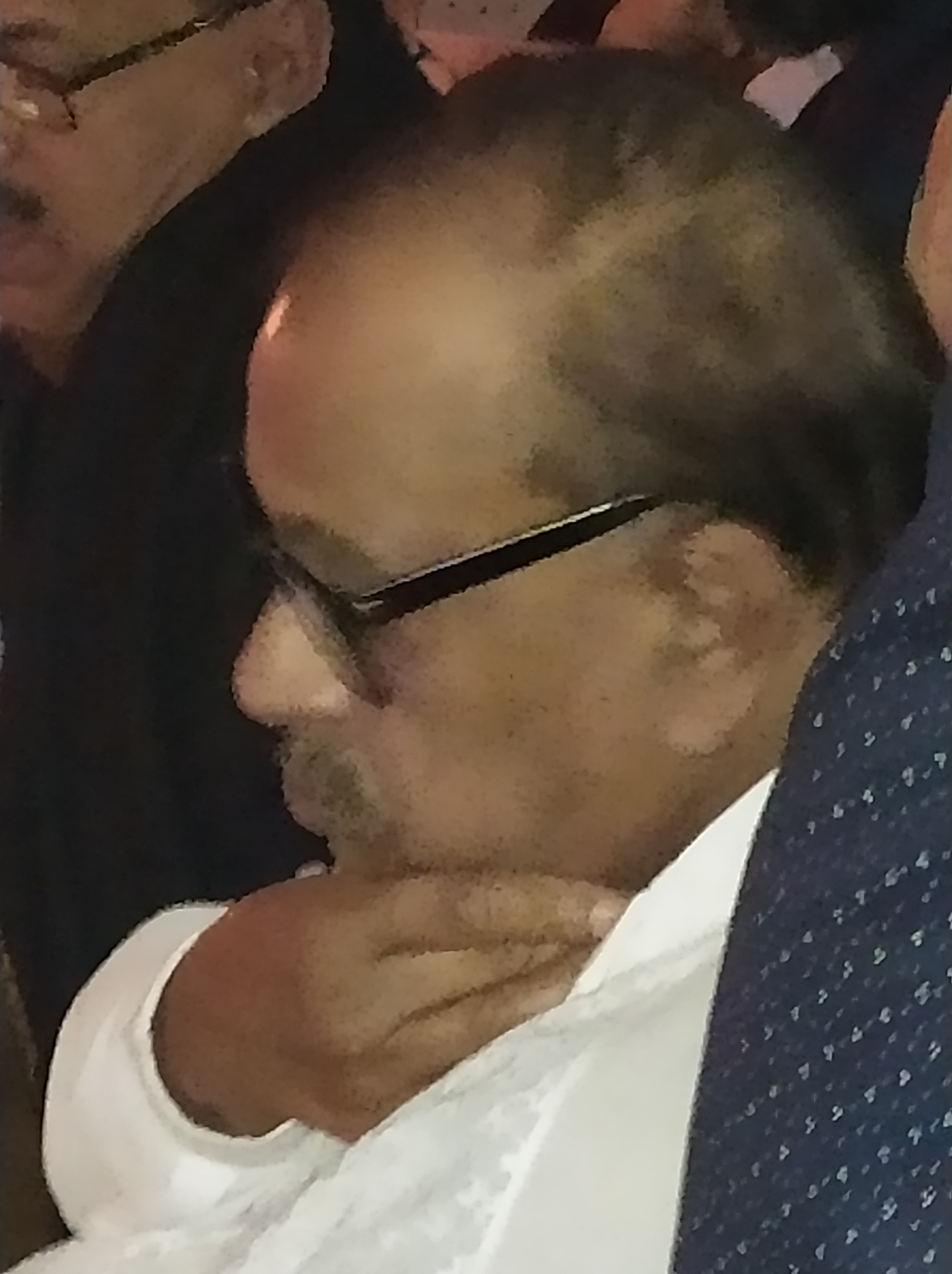
- Raju in 2020

Member of Parliament
- In office 14 July 1996 – 6 August 2024
- Preceded by: Abdul Ali Mridha
- Succeeded by: Vacant
- Constituency: Narsingdi-5

Minister of Labour and Employment
- In office 16 September 2012 – 24 January 2014
- Preceded by: Khandaker Mosharraf Hossain

Minister for Posts and Telecommunications
- In office January 2009 – 16 September 2012
- Succeeded by: Sahara Khatun

Personal details
- Born: 2 February 1944 (age 82) Narsingdi, Bengal Province, British India
- Party: Bangladesh Awami League

Rajiuddin Ahmed Raju (born 2 February 1944) is an Awami League politician. He is a former posts and telecommunications minister, and labour and employment minister. He represented the Narsingdi-5 constituency in the Jatiya Sangsad from 1996 to 2024.

== Early life ==
Raju was born on 2 February 1944 to a Bengali family in southern Adiabad, Raipura, Narsingdi subdivision, then part of the Dacca district of Bengal. He has a Bachelor of Arts degree.

== Career ==
Raju was elected to parliament in 1996 from Narsingdi-5 as an Awami League candidate. He received 75,672 votes while his nearest rival, Abdul Ali Mridha of the Bangladesh Nationalist Party, received 61,862 votes.

Raju was elected to parliament in 2001 from Narsingdi-5 as an Awami League candidate. He received 117,096 votes while his nearest rival, Abdul Ali Mridha of the Bangladesh Nationalist Party, received 99,509 votes.

Raju was elected to parliament in 2008 from Narsingdi-5 as an Awami League candidate. He received 93,746 votes while his nearest rival, Abdul Mannan Bhuiyan of the Bangladesh Nationalist Party, received 66,942 votes.

In January 2009, Raju was appointed the minister for posts and telecommunications.

Raju's brother, Salauddin Ahmed Bachchu, was accused in the murder of a former mayor of Narsingdi, who was killed on 1 November 2011. Raju was in Geneva at the time of the murder. After he returned to Bangladesh he held a 15-minute meeting with Prime Minister Sheikh Hasina. The meeting was also attended by three other Awami League members of parliament representing Narsingdi District: Anwarul Ashraf Khan, Muhammad Nazrul Islam, and Zahirul Haque Bhuiyan Mohan. The prime minister requested him to prove his brother's innocence after the meeting.

On 16 September 2012, Raju was replaced by Sahara Khatun as the minister for posts and telecommunications. Raju was then appointed the minister of labour and employment.

On 3 January 2013, Raju was dropped from the presidium council of the Awami League. On 15 July 2013, Raju placed the Labour Law (amendment 2006)-2013 in parliament which was then passed by the treasury bench. Raju was removed from the cabinet of Bangladesh on 21 November 2013.

Raju was elected to parliament in 2014 from Narsingdi-5 as an Awami League candidate. He was elected unopposed as the election was boycotted by all major political parties. Raju was not included in the third Hasina Cabinet formed after the general elections on 12 January 2014.

Raju was elected to parliament in 2018 from Narsingdi-5 as an Awami League candidate. He had received 2,94,484 votes while his nearest rival, Md Ashraf Uddin of Bangladesh Nationalist Party, received 20,431 votes.

== Personal life ==
Raju's wife, Umme Salema Begum, is the principal of Udayan Higher Secondary School.

Raju was hospitalised at Samorita Hospital on 18 March 2013 after falling ill during a meeting of the cabinet of Bangladesh.
