= Narsingdi-5 =

Constituency of Bangladesh's Jatiya Sangsad

Coordinates: 23.9929°N 90.8703°E

- Constituency for the Jatiya Sangsad
- District: Narsingdi District
- Division: Dhaka Division
- Electorate: 455,297 (2024)

Current constituency
- Created: 1984
- Party: Bangladesh Nationalist Party
- Member: Ashraf Uddin
- ← 202 Narsingdi-4 204 Narayanganj-1 →

Narsingdi-5 is a constituency represented in the Jatiya Sangsad (National Parliament) of Bangladesh since 2026 by Ashraf Uddin of the Bangladesh Nationalist Party.

== Boundaries ==
The constituency encompasses Raipura Upazila.

== History ==
The constituency was created in 1984 from the Dhaka-26 constituency when the former Dhaka District was split into six districts: Manikganj, Munshiganj, Dhaka, Gazipur, Narsingdi, and Narayanganj.

Ahead of the 2008 general election, the Election Commission redrew constituency boundaries to reflect population changes revealed by the 2001 Bangladesh census. The 2008 redistricting altered the boundaries of the constituency.

Ahead of the 2014 general election, the Election Commission expanded the boundaries of the constituency to include all of Raipura Upazila. Previously it had excluded three union parishads: Daukar Char, Marjal, and Uttar Bakharnagar.

== Members of Parliament ==
Election	Member	Party
1986	Asadul Haq Khasru	National Awami Party
1988	Moin Uddin Bhuiyan	Jatiya Party
1991	Abdul Ali Mridha	Bangladesh Nationalist Party
Feb 1996	Abdul Ali Mridha	Bangladesh Nationalist Party
Jun 1996	Rajiuddin Ahmed	Awami League
2001	Rajiuddin Ahmed	Awami League
2008	Rajiuddin Ahmed	Awami League
2014	Rajiuddin Ahmed	Awami League
2018	Rajiuddin Ahmed	Awami League
2024	Rajiuddin Ahmed	Awami League
2026	Ashraf Uddin	Bangladesh Nationalist Party

== Elections ==
=== Elections in the 2020s ===
General election 2026: Narsingdi-5
Party	Candidate	Votes	%	±%
BNP	Ashraf Uddin			
BKM	Tajul Islam			
IAB	Badruzzaman Uzzal			
Independent	Md. Panir Hossain			
Independent	Jamal Ahmed Chowdhury			
BIF	Mashiur Rahman			
Majority				
Turnout				
Registered electors		494,650		
BNP gain from AL				

=== Elections in the 2010s ===
Rajiuddin Ahmed Raju was re-elected unopposed in the 2014 general election after opposition parties withdrew their candidacies in a boycott of the election.

=== Elections in the 2000s ===
General Election 2008: Narsingdi-5
Party	Candidate	Votes	%	±%
AL	Rajiuddin Ahmed Raju	142,416	64.0	+10.9
BNP	Jamal Ahmed Chowdhury	77,549	34.8	−10.3
Independent	Md. Shahidul Islam	1,674	0.8	N/A
Gano Forum	Farida Yasmin	694	0.3	N/A
NAP	Omar Farook	205	0.1	N/A
Majority		64,867	29.1	+21.1
Turnout		222,538	88.9	+12.8
AL hold				

General Election 2001: Narsingdi-5
Party	Candidate	Votes	%	±%
AL	Rajiuddin Ahmed Raju	117,096	53.1	+8.1
BNP	Abdul Ali Mridha	99,509	45.1	+8.3
IJOF	Md. Hossain Bhuyan	3,327	1.5	N/A
CPB	Md. Aminul Haq	790	0.4	N/A
Majority		17,587	8.0	−0.2
Turnout		220,722	76.1	−0.4
AL hold				

=== Elections in the 1990s ===
General Election June 1996: Narsingdi-5
Party	Candidate	Votes	%	±%
AL	Rajiuddin Ahmed Raju	75,672	45.0	+22.5
BNP	Abdul Ali Mridha	61,862	36.8	+13.7
JP(E)	Moin Uddin Bhuiyan	21,759	12.9	+12.3
Jamaat	Md. Sulaiman Mridha	3,645	2.2	N/A
IOJ	Md. Aminur Rahman	3,142	1.9	N/A
Zaker Party	Sarkar Tamiz Uddin Ahmed	784	0.5	−1.0
FP	Ibrahim Mridha	454	0.3	N/A
Independent	Asadul Haq Khasru	398	0.2	+5.0
BKA	Abul Kashem Kashemi	256	0.2	N/A
Ganatantri Party	A. K. M. Shahidul Islam	193	0.1	−16.4
Majority		13,820	8.2	+7.6
Turnout		168,165	76.5	+18.6
AL gain from BNP				

General Election 1991: Narsingdi-5
Party	Candidate	Votes	%	±%
BNP	Abdul Ali Mridha	37,360	23.1	
AL	Rajiuddin Ahmed Raju	36,455	22.5	
Independent	A. Based Chowdhury	29,956	18.5	
Ganatantri Party	Fazlul Haq Khandakar	26,758	16.5	
Independent	Moin Uddin Bhuiyan	14,642	9.0	
Independent	Asadul Haq Khasru	8,390	5.2	
Independent	A. Momen Bhuiyan	4,508	2.8	
Zaker Party	Matiur Rahman	2,476	1.5	
JP(E)	A. Hai Farazi	1,019	0.6	
Bangladesh Muslim League (Yusuf)	Rezaul Karim	328	0.2	
Majority		905	0.6	
Turnout		161,892	57.9	
BNP gain from JP(E)				
