= Manzur Elahi =

Bangladeshi politician (born 1972)

- মনজুর এলাহী

Member of the Bangladesh Parliament for Narsingdi-3
- Incumbent
- Assumed office 17 February 2026
- Preceded by: Md. Shirajul Islam Mollah

Personal details
- Born: 1 June 1972 (age 54) Narsingdi Sadar Upazila, Narsingdi District
- Party: Bangladesh Nationalist Party

Manzur Elahi is a Bangladeshi politician. As of March 2026, he is serving as a member of parliament from Narsingdi-3.

== Early life ==
Elahi was born on 1 June 1972 at Narsingdi Sadar Upazila under Narsingdi District.
