= Ashraf Uddin =

Bangladeshi politician (born 1969)

Md. Ashraf Uddin
- মোঃ আশরাফ উদ্দিন

Member of the Bangladesh Parliament for Narsingdi-5
- Incumbent
- Assumed office 17 February 2026
- Preceded by: Rajiuddin Ahmed Raju

Personal details
- Born: 22 June 1969 (age 57) Raipura Upazila, Narsingdi District
- Party: Bangladesh Nationalist Party

Md. Ashraf Uddin is a Bangladeshi politician. As of March 2026, he is serving as a member of parliament from Narsingdi-5.
