= Shahjahan Saju =

Bangladeshi politician

Member of Bangladesh Parliament
- In office 1988–1991
- Preceded by: Kamal Haider
- Succeeded by: Abdul Mannan Bhuiyan

Personal details
- Party: Jatiya Party (Ershad)

Shahjahan Saju is a Jatiya Party (Ershad) politician in Bangladesh and a former member of parliament for Narsingdi-3.

== Career ==
Saju was elected to parliament from Narsingdi-3 as a Jatiya Party candidate in 1988. He is the former Narsingdi District council president.
