= Karai Tala =

Coordinates: 24.005°N 90.914°E

Karai Tala (Bengali: কড়ই তলা) is a village in Chandarkandi Union of Raipura Upazila, Narsingdi District, Bangladesh. According to the 2011 Bangladesh census, it had a population of 2,470.
