= Hazipur Nasir Uddin Memorial High School =

Coordinates: 23.9251°N 90.7300°E

Information
- Established: 1996; 29 years ago
- Enrollment: c.1400

Hazipur Nasir Uddin Memorial High School is a secondary school in Hazipur village, Narsingdi Sadar Upazila, Narsingdi District, Bangladesh. It was established in 1996. It was named after Nasir Uddin, son of Chairman Abu Thaher. There are about 1,400 students. The Education Institute Identification Number (EIIN) of the school is 112664.
