= Narsingdi-3 =

Constituency of Bangladesh's Jatiya Sangsad

Coordinates: 24.04°N 90.74°E

- Constituency for the Jatiya Sangsad
- District: Narsingdi District
- Division: Dhaka Division
- Electorate: 224,610 (2018)

Current constituency
- Created: 1984
- Party: Bangladesh Nationalist Party
- Member: Manzur Elahi
- ← 200 Narsingdi-2 202 Narsingdi-4 →

Narsingdi-3 is a constituency represented in the Jatiya Sangsad (National Parliament) of Bangladesh since 2026 by Manzur Elahi of the Bangladesh Nationalist Party.

== Boundaries ==
The constituency encompasses Shibpur Upazila.

== History ==
The constituency was created in 1984 from a Dhaka constituency when the former Dhaka District was split into six districts: Manikganj, Munshiganj, Dhaka, Gazipur, Narsingdi, and Narayanganj.

Ahead of the 2008 general election, the Election Commission redrew constituency boundaries to reflect population changes revealed by the 2001 Bangladesh census. The 2008 redistricting altered the boundaries of the constituency.

Ahead of the 2014 general election, the Election Commission reduced the boundaries of the constituency. Previously it had included three union parishads of Raipura Upazila: Daukar Char, Marjal, Uttar Bakharnagar.

== Members of Parliament ==
Election	Member	Party
1986	Kamal Haider	National Awami Party
1988	Shahjahan Saju	Jatiya Party
1991	Abdul Mannan Bhuiyan	Bangladesh Nationalist Party
Feb 1996	Abdul Mannan Bhuiyan	Bangladesh Nationalist Party
Jun 1996	Abdul Mannan Bhuiyan	Bangladesh Nationalist Party
2001	Abdul Mannan Bhuiyan	Bangladesh Nationalist Party
2008	Zahirul Haque Bhuiyan Mohan	Awami League
2014	Md. Shirajul Islam Mollah	Independent
2018	Zahirul Haque Bhuiyan Mohan	Awami League
2024	Md. Shirajul Islam Mollah	Independent
2026	Manzur Elahi	Bangladesh Nationalist Party

== Elections ==
=== Elections in the 2020s ===
General election 2026: Narsingdi-3
Party	Candidate	Votes	%	±%
BNP	Manzur Elahi	81,415		
Independent	Md. Arif-ul-Islam Mridha	45,401		
BKM	Md. Rakibul Islam			
IAB	Md. Waez Hossain Bhuiyan			
Jamaat	Md. Mostafizur Rahman			
Zaker Party	Abu Sadat Mohammad Sayem Ali Pathan			
Majority		36,014		
Turnout				
Registered electors		284,248		
BNP gain from Independent				

=== Elections in the 2010s ===
General Election 2018: Narsingdi-3
Party	Candidate	Votes	%	±%
AL	Zahirul Haque Bhuiyan Mohon	94,035	59.31	+22.41
Independent	Md. Shirajul Islam Mollah	52,876	33.35	−29.75
IAB	Md Wazed Hossain Bhuiyan	11,643	7.34	N/A
Majority		41,159	25.96	−0.34
Turnout		1,58,554	70.59	+25.59
AL gain from Independent				

General Election 2014: Narsingdi-3
Party	Candidate	Votes	%	±%
Independent	Md. Shirajul Islam Mollah	54,643	63.1	N/A
AL	Zahirul Haque Bhuiyan Mohon	31,903	36.9	−15.2
Majority		22,740	26.3	+11.4
Turnout		86,546	45.0	
Independent gain from AL				

=== Elections in the 2000s ===
General Election 2008: Narsingdi-3
Party	Candidate	Votes	%	±%
AL	Zahirul Haque Bhuiyan Mohan	93,746	52.1	+16.1
Independent	Abdul Mannan Bhuiyan	66,942	37.2	N/A
BNP	Tofazzal Hossain	15,646	8.7	−40.5
IAB	Md. Harisul Hoq	2,363	1.3	N/A
Gano Forum	A.K.M. Jaglul Haider Afric	920	0.5	N/A
National People's Party	Md. Altaf Hossain	164	0.1	N/A
NAP	Md. Hossain Molla	76	0.0	N/A
PDP	Md. A. Baten Sarker	51	0.0	N/A
Majority		26,804	14.9	+1.7
Turnout		179,908	89.7	+9.3
AL gain from BNP				

General Election 2001: Narsingdi-3
Party	Candidate	Votes	%	±%
BNP	Abdul Mannan Bhuiyan	61,453	49.2	+0.9
AL	Mahbubur Rahman Bhuiyan	44,961	36.0	+9.9
IJOF	Md. Sajahan	17,966	14.4	N/A
Zaker Party	Md. Masihul Gani	251	0.2	−0.7
Bangladesh Progressive Party	Altaf Hossain	230	0.2	N/A
Jatiya Party (M)	Md. Mafizul Islam Sarkar	107	0.1	N/A
Majority		16,492	13.2	−9.0
Turnout		124,968	80.4	−3.1
BNP hold				

=== Elections in the 1990s ===
General Election June 1996: Narsingdi-3
Party	Candidate	Votes	%	±%
BNP	Abdul Mannan Bhuiyan	48,936	48.3	+1.0
AL	Mahbubur Rahman Bhuiyan	26,441	26.1	N/A
JP(E)	Zaki Uddin Ahmed	21,688	21.4	−1.4
IOJ	Md. Harisul Haque	1,517	1.5	N/A
Jamaat	A. K. Musleh Uddin Romari	1,382	1.4	N/A
Zaker Party	Sarkar Tamijuddin Ahmed	900	0.9	−2.6
Independent	Abdul Latif	382	0.4	N/A
Majority		22,495	22.2	−2.3
Turnout		101,246	83.5	+21.0
BNP hold				

General Election 1991: Narsingdi-3
Party	Candidate	Votes	%	±%
BNP	Abdul Mannan Bhuiyan	41,515	47.3	
JP(E)	Shahjahan Saju	19,979	22.8	
Independent	Mahbubur Rahman Bhuiyan	19,530	22.2	
Zaker Party	A. Hannan Bhuiyan	3,042	3.4	
NAP (Muzaffar)	Kamal Haider	3,026	3.5	
Jatiya Samajtantrik Dal-JSD	Fazlur Rahman	382	0.4	
FP	Sarwar Hossain Khan	238	0.3	
Bangladesh National Congress	Emran Khan	79	0.1	
Majority		21,536	24.5	
Turnout		87,791	62.5	
BNP gain from JP(E)				
