= Tolatoly =

Village in Raipura Upazilla, Narsingdi

Tolatoly তুলাতুলী
- Village
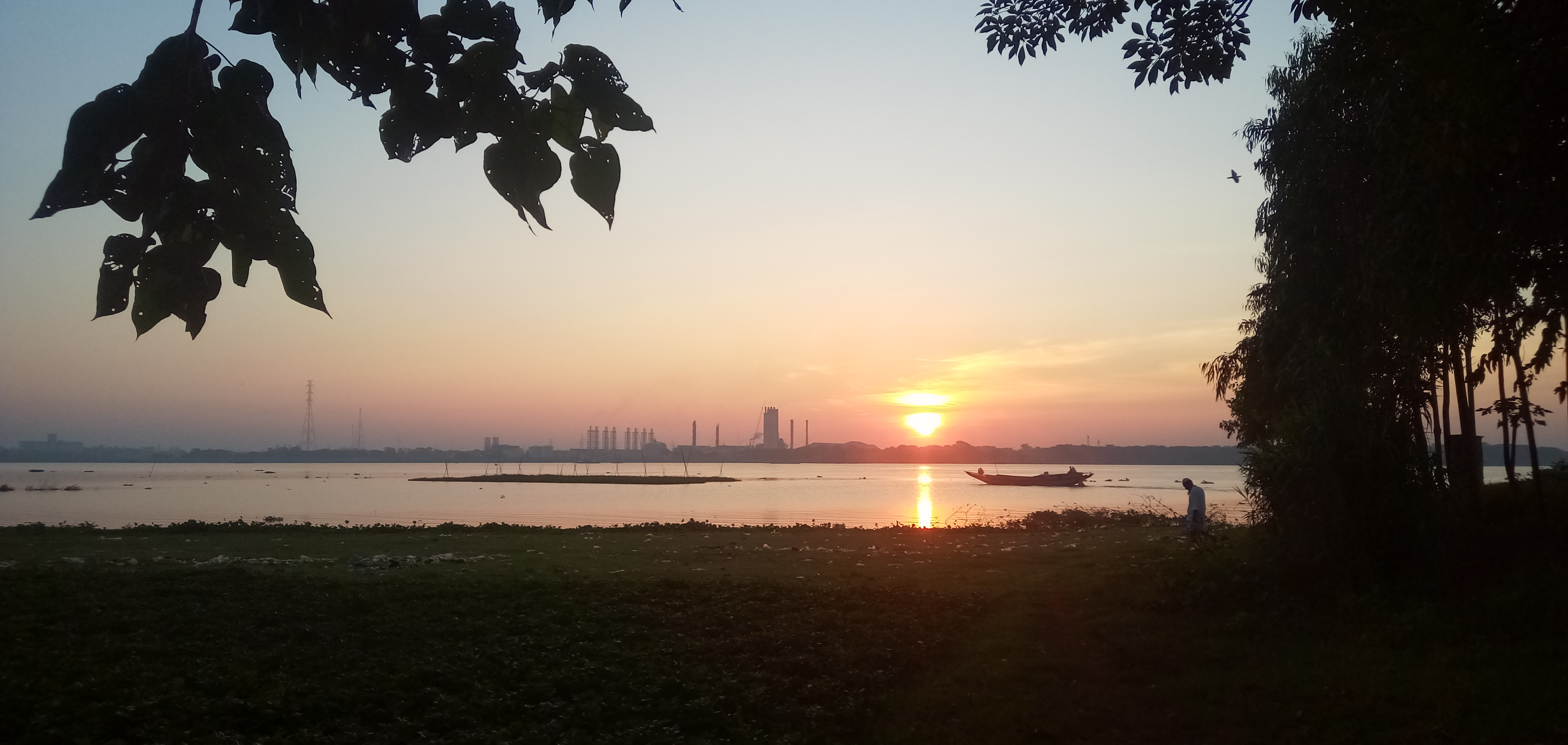
- View of the Meghna River side from the Tolatoly Village

- Location within Bangladesh
- Coordinates: 24.0235°N 90.9641°E
- Country: Bangladesh
- Division: Dhaka
- District: Narsingdi
- Upazila: Raipura
- Union Council: 7 No. Musapur Union Parishad
- Time zone: UTC+6 (BST)
- Postal code: 1630

Tolatoly (Bengali: তুলাতুলী) is a village in Musapur Union, Raipura Upazila, Narsingdi District. The Meghna River flows past the village of Tolatoly and this village is at the end of Raipura Upazila of Narsingdi District and from this village can be visit Ashuganj Upazila of Brahmanbaria District and Bhairab Upazila.

== Educations ==
- 61 No. Tolatoly Government Primary School
- Mosammad Anwarul Uloom Madrasha
- M.S. Kindergarten (private school)
- Umme Kulsum Mohila Madrasha
- Tolatoly Model High School
- Hazrat Ayesha Siddiqa Mohila Madrasha & Orphanage
- Ajijul Uloom Rashidiya Mohila Madrasha

== Instances ==
Somoy TV news published as "RAB-11 has arrested three youths with weapons and ammunition from Raipura, Narsingdi. They were arrested after conducting a raid in the Tolatoly Chawkbazar area of Raipura police station on Saturday (October 29, 2022) night".
