= Moin Uddin Bhuiyan =

Bangladeshi politician

Main Uddin Bhuiyan

Member of Bangladesh Parliament
- In office 1979–1991
- Preceded by: Aftab Uddin Bhuiyan
- Succeeded by: Abdul Ali Mridha

Personal details
- Born: 15 October 1948 Raipura thana, Narsingdi District, Dominion of India
- Died: 11 February 2015 (aged 66) Dhaka, Bangladesh
- Party: College Life - Chatro Union, National Awami Party (NAP), One of the founders of Bangladesh National Party (BNP), One of the founders/leaders of Jatiya Party, And then finally to Bangladesh National Party (BNP)

Main Uddin Bhuiyan was a Bangladeshi Nationalist Party BNP politician, member of Parliament for Narsingdi-5., a minister in the department of agriculture and forestry in 1984, then became the first district council chairman of Narsingdi in 1988, and finally in 1989 became the whip (controller) of Parliament.

== Career ==
Mr. Bhuiyan was elected to parliament from Narsingdi-5 as a BNP candidate in 1979 as youngest parliament member under the leadership of Ziaur Rahman who became the president on 1979. Later he joined Jatio Party under Ershad tenure. Later in his Career he joined to his Original Party BNP and finally ended his career with BNP till death. He was Member of Parliament, Agriculture Deputy Minister and Whip of Parliament in his career. He has a wife, (still living) 6 sons and 2 daughters, with one son in the political field, working right now to reach a political level like his father once did. He is known in the area to make major changes to Narsingdi during his time of being elected. He was able to make a railway system and buildings there as well. w He died on 11 February 2015 in Dhaka during a surgery to treat lung cancer. |source: grandson of Main Uddin Bhuiyan|
