= Adiabad Union =

Adiabad Union আদিয়াবাদ ইউনিয়ন
- Location within Bangladesh
- Coordinates: 23°58′N 90°53′E
- Country: Bangladesh
- Division: Dhaka Division
- District: Narsingdi District
- Upazila: Raipura Upazila

Government
  - Type: Union Council
- Demonym: Adiabadi
- Time zone: UTC+6 (BST)

Adiabad Union (Bengali: আদিয়াবাদ ইউনিয়ন) is a Union of Raipura Upazila in Narsingdi District, Dhaka Division, Bangladesh. Its population is 9,692 men and 10,667 women, and the Union's literacy rate is 49 per cent.

== Villages ==
1. Sirajnagar
2. Nayachar
3. Sherpur
4. Wahedpur
5. Adiabad Uttarpara
6. Adiabad Purbapara
7. Adiabad Kalikurpara
8. Adiabad Shiqdarpara
9. Adiabad Madhyapara
10. Adiabad Dakshinpara

== Notable people ==
- Rajiuddin Ahmed Raju (born 1944), politician
