= Nilakhya Union =

Nilakhya Union নিলক্ষ্যা ইউনিয়ন
- Location within Bangladesh
- Country: Bangladesh
- Division: Dhaka Division
- District: Narsingdi District
- Upazila: Raipura Upazila

Government
  - Type: Union Council
- Time zone: UTC+6 (BST)

Nilakhya Union (Bengali: নিলক্ষ্যা ইউনিয়ন) is a Union of Raipura Upazila in Narsingdi District, Dhaka Division, Bangladesh. Its population is 11,458 men and 12,518 women, and the Union's literacy rate is 26.6 per cent.
