= Char Aralia Union =

Char Aralia Union চর আড়ালিয়া ইউনিয়ন
- Location within Bangladesh
- Country: Bangladesh
- Division: Dhaka Division
- District: Narsingdi District
- Upazila: Raipura Upazila

Government
  - Type: Union Council
- Time zone: UTC+6 (BST)

Char Aralia Union (Bengali: চর আড়ালিয়া ইউনিয়ন) is a Union of Raipura Upazila in Narsingdi District, Dhaka Division, Bangladesh. Its population is 6,874 men and 7,171 women, and the Union's literacy rate is 27.5 per cent.
