= Sreenagar Union =

Sreenagar Union শ্রীনগর ইউনিয়ন
- Location within Bangladesh
- Coordinates: 23.9623°N 90.8695°E
- Country: Bangladesh
- Division: Dhaka Division
- District: Narsingdi District
- Upazila: Raipura Upazila

Government
  - Type: Union Council
- Time zone: UTC+6 (BST)

Sreenagar Union (Bengali: শ্রীনগর ইউনিয়ন) is a union parishad of Raipura Upazila in Narsingdi District, Dhaka Division, Bangladesh. Its population is 13,292 men and 14,211 women, and the union's literacy rate is 28.3 per cent.
