= Raipura Union =

Raipura Union রায়পুরা ইউনিয়ন
- Location within Bangladesh
- Country: Bangladesh
- Division: Dhaka Division
- District: Narsingdi District
- Upazila: Raipura Upazila

Government
  - Type: Union Council
- Time zone: UTC+6 (BST)

Raipura Union (Bengali: রায়পুরা ইউনিয়ন) is a Union of Raipura Upazila in Narsingdi District, Dhaka Division, Bangladesh. Its population is 5,398 men and 6,026 women, and the Union's literacy rate is 43.9 percent.
