= Mirzar Char Union =

Mirzar Char Union মির্জারচর ইউনিয়ন
- Location within Bangladesh
- Country: Bangladesh
- Division: Dhaka Division
- District: Narsingdi District
- Upazila: Raipura Upazila

Government
  - Type: Union Council
- Time zone: UTC+6 (BST)

Mirzar Char Union (Bengali: মির্জারচর ইউনিয়ন) is a Union of Raipura Upazila in Narsingdi District, Dhaka Division, Bangladesh. Its population is 4,208 men and 4,632 women, and the Union's literacy rate is 23.5 per cent.
