= Amirganj Union =

Amirganj Union আমিরগঞ্জ ইউনিয়ন
- Location within Bangladesh
- Coordinates: 23°58′N 90°53′E
- Country: Bangladesh
- Division: Dhaka Division
- District: Narsingdi District
- Upazila: Raipura Upazila

Government
  - Type: Union Council
- Time zone: UTC+6 (BST)

Amirganj Union (Bengali: আমিরগঞ্জ ইউনিয়ন) is a Union of Raipura Upazila in Narsingdi District, Dhaka Division, Bangladesh. Its population is 19,305 men and 19,298 women, and the Union's literacy rate is 49.9 per cent.

On 4 April 2024, two employees of Nagad were robbed of 6 million BDT in Amirganj Union.
