= Palashtali Union =

Palashtali Union পলাশতলী ইউনিয়ন
- Location within Bangladesh
- Country: Bangladesh
- Division: Dhaka Division
- District: Narsingdi District
- Upazila: Raipura Upazila

Government
  - Type: Union Council
- Time zone: UTC+6 (BST)

Palashtali Union (Bengali: পলাশতলী ইউনিয়ন) is a Union of Raipura Upazila in Narsingdi District, Dhaka Division, Bangladesh. Its population is 15,317 men and 16,998 women, and the Union's literacy rate is 47.2 per cent.
