= Chanderkandi Union =

Chanderkandi Union চান্দেরকান্দি ইউনিয়ন
- Location within Bangladesh
- Coordinates: 24.0054°N 90.8978°E
- Country: Bangladesh
- Division: Dhaka Division
- District: Narsingdi District
- Upazila: Raipura Upazila

Government
  - Type: Union Council
- Time zone: UTC+6 (BST)

Chanderkandi Union (Bengali: চান্দেরকান্দি ইউনিয়ন) is a union parishad of Raipura Upazila in Narsingdi District, Dhaka Division, Bangladesh. Its population is 7,424 men and 8,132 women, and the union's literacy rate is 41.5 per cent.
