= Maheshpur Union =

Maheshpur Union মহেশপুর ইউনিয়ন
- Location within Bangladesh
- Coordinates: 24.0086°N 90.9454°E
- Country: Bangladesh
- Division: Dhaka Division
- District: Narsingdi District
- Upazila: Raipura Upazila

Government
  - Type: Union Council
- Time zone: UTC+6 (BST)

Maheshpur Union (Bengali: মহেশপুর ইউনিয়ন) is a union parishad of Raipura Upazila in Narsingdi District, Dhaka Division, Bangladesh. Its population is 12,419 men and 13,798 women, and the union's literacy rate is 39.4 per cent.
