= Banshgari Union =

Banshgari Union বাঁশগাড়ি ইউনিয়ন
- Location within Bangladesh
- Coordinates: 23.9187°N 90.8907°E
- Country: Bangladesh
- Division: Dhaka Division
- District: Narsingdi District
- Upazila: Raipura Upazila

Government
  - Type: Union Council
- Time zone: UTC+6 (BST)

Banshgari Union (Bengali: বাঁশগাড়ি ইউনিয়ন) is a union parishad of Raipura Upazila in Narsingdi District, Dhaka Division, Bangladesh. Its population is 8,353 men and 8,852 women, and the union's literacy rate is 23.7 per cent.
