= Mirzanagar Union =

Mirzanagar Union মির্জানগর ইউনিয়ন
- Location within Bangladesh
- Country: Bangladesh
- Division: Dhaka Division
- District: Narsingdi District
- Upazila: Raipura Upazila

Government
  - Type: Union Council
- Time zone: UTC+6 (BST)

Mirzanagar Union (Bengali: মির্জানগর ইউনিয়ন) is a Union of Raipura Upazila in Narsingdi District, Dhaka Division, Bangladesh. Its population is 10,368 men and 11,290 women, and the Union's literacy rate is 45.7 per cent.
