= Mirzapur Union, Raipura =

Mirzapur Union মির্জাপুর ইউনিয়ন
- Location within Bangladesh
- Coordinates: 24.0231°N 90.9251°E
- Country: Bangladesh
- Division: Dhaka Division
- District: Narsingdi District
- Upazila: Raipura Upazila

Government
  - Type: Union Council
- Time zone: UTC+6 (BST)

Mirzapur Union (Bengali: মির্জাপুর ইউনিয়ন) is a union parishad of Raipura Upazila in Narsingdi District, Dhaka Division, Bangladesh. Its population is 12,077 men and 12,229 women, and the union's literacy rate is 47.7 per cent.
