= Musapur Union, Raipura =

Musapur Union মুছাপুর ইউনিয়ন
- Location within Bangladesh
- Coordinates: 24.0292°N 90.9525°E
- Country: Bangladesh
- Division: Dhaka Division
- District: Narsingdi District
- Upazila: Raipura Upazila

Government
  - Type: Union Council
- Time zone: UTC+6 (BST)

Musapur Union (Bengali: মুছাপুর ইউনিয়ন) is a union parishad of Raipura Upazila in Narsingdi District, Dhaka Division, Bangladesh. Its population is 14,197 men and 14,924 women, and the union's literacy rate is 47.9 per cent.

== See also ==
- Tolatoly (village of Musapur Union)
