= Paratali Union =

Paratali Union পাড়াতলী ইউনিয়ন
- Location within Bangladesh
- Country: Bangladesh
- Division: Dhaka Division
- District: Narsingdi District
- Upazila: Raipura Upazila

Government
  - Type: Union Council
- Time zone: UTC+6 (BST)

Paratali Union (Bengali: পাড়াতলী ইউনিয়ন) is a Union of Raipura Upazila in Narsingdi District, Dhaka Division, Bangladesh. Its population is 13,275 men and 14,429 women, and the Union's literacy rate is 26.5 per cent.
