= Chandpur Union, Raipura =

Chandpur Union চানপুর ইউনিয়ন
- Location within Bangladesh
- Country: Bangladesh
- Division: Dhaka Division
- District: Narsingdi District
- Upazila: Raipura Upazila

Government
  - Type: Union Council
- Time zone: UTC+6 (BST)

Chandpur Union (Bengali: চানপুর ইউনিয়ন) is a Union of Raipura Upazila in Narsingdi District, Dhaka Division, Bangladesh. Its population is 11,964 men and 12,237 women, and the Union's literacy rate is 25.8 per cent.
