= Alipura Union =

Alipura Union অলিপুরা ইউনিয়ন
- Location in Bangladesh
- Coordinates: 23°58′N 90°53′E
- Country: Bangladesh
- Division: Dhaka Division
- District: Narsingdi District
- Upazila: Raipura Upazila

Government
  - Type: Union Council
- Time zone: UTC+6 (BST)

Alipura Union (Bengali: অলিপুরা ইউনিয়ন) is a Union of Raipura Upazila in Narsingdi District, Dhaka Division, Bangladesh. Its population is 8,055 men and 8,679 women, and the Union's literacy rate is 43.1 per cent.
