= Char Madhua Union =

Char Madhua Union চরমুধুয়া ইউনিয়ন
- Location within Bangladesh
- Country: Bangladesh
- Division: Dhaka Division
- District: Narsingdi District
- Upazila: Raipura Upazila

Government
  - Type: Union Council
- Time zone: UTC+6 (BST)

Char Madhua Union (Bengali: চরমুধুয়া ইউনিয়ন) is a Union of Raipura Upazila in Narsingdi District, Dhaka Division, Bangladesh. Its population is 4,585 men and 5,324 women, and the Union's literacy rate is 28.8 per cent.
