= Asadul Haq Khasru =

Bangladeshi politician

Member of Bangladesh Parliament
- In office 1986–1988
- Succeeded by: Moin Uddin Bhuiyan

Personal details
- Party: Jatiya Party (Ershad)

Asadul Haq Khasru is a Jatiya Party (Ershad) politician and a former member of parliament for Narsingdi-5.

== Career ==
Khasru was elected to parliament from Narsingdi-5 as a Jatiya Party candidate in 1986.
