= Hairmara Union =

Hairmara Union হাইরমারা ইউনিয়ন
- Location within Bangladesh
- Country: Bangladesh
- Division: Dhaka Division
- District: Narsingdi District
- Upazila: Raipura Upazila

Government
  - Type: Union Council
- Time zone: UTC+6 (BST)

Hairmara Union (Bengali: হাইরমারা ইউনিয়ন) is a Union of Raipura Upazila in Narsingdi District, Dhaka Division, Bangladesh. Its population is 7,668 men and 8,132 women, and the Union's literacy rate is 42.8 per cent.
