= Char Subuddi Union =

Char Subuddi Union চরসুবুদ্ধি ইউনিয়ন
- Location within Bangladesh
- Country: Bangladesh
- Division: Dhaka Division
- District: Narsingdi District
- Upazila: Raipura Upazila

Government
  - Type: Union Council
- Time zone: UTC+6 (BST)

Char Subuddi Union (Bengali: চরসুবুদ্ধি ইউনিয়ন) is a Union of Raipura Upazila in Narsingdi District, Dhaka Division, Bangladesh. Its population is 10,283 men and 11,155 women, and the Union's literacy rate is 36.4 per cent.
