= British National Party (disambiguation) =

The British National Party is a far-right political party currently active in Britain, founded in 1982.

British National Party may also refer to other far-right parties:

- the British National Party (1942), active during the Second World War
- the British National Party (1960), active during the 1960s
- the British National Party (1970s), led by Eddy Morrison

== See also ==
- National Party (UK, 1917)
- National Party of the United Kingdom (est. 1976)
- BNP (disambiguation)
- National Party (disambiguation); including other NPs in GB/UK
- National (disambiguation)
