= Abdul Mannan Bhuiyan =

Bangladeshi politician

- আব্দুল মান্নান ভূঁইয়া

6th General Secretary of Bangladesh Nationalist Party
- In office 26 June 1996 – 3 September 2007
- Chaiperson: Khaleda Zia
- Preceded by: Abdus Salam Talukder
- Succeeded by: Khandaker Delwar Hossain

Minister of Local Government, Rural Development and Co-operatives
- In office 10 October 2001 – 28 October 2006
- Prime Minister: Khaleda Zia
- Preceded by: Zillur Rahman
- Succeeded by: M. Azizul Haq (caretaker) (1 November 2006)

Member of Parliament
- In office 20 March 1991 – 29 October 2006
- Preceded by: Shahjahan
- Succeeded by: Zahirul Haque Bhuiyan Mohan
- Constituency: Narsingdi-3

Personal details
- Born: 3 January 1943 Narsingdi, Bengal Presidency, British India
- Died: 28 July 2010 (aged 67) Dhaka, Bangladesh
- Party: Bangladesh Nationalist Party
- Spouse: Mariam Begum
- Occupation: Politician

Abdul Mannan Bhuiyan (/ɑːbˈduːl məˈnɑːn buˈiːə/; 3 January 1943 – 28 July 2010) was a Bangladeshi politician of the Bangladesh Nationalist Party.

== Early life ==
Abdul Mannan Bhuiyan was born on 3 January 1943 at his maternal grandfather's house in Asad Nagar village, Mashimpur Union, Shibpur Upazila in Narsingdi District, to his father Abdul Hai Bhuiyan and his mother Rahima Begum. He began his education at a village primary school, passed the Matriculation examination from Shibpur Pilot High School in 1958, and completed his Higher Secondary Certificate from Narsingdi College in 1960. He earned his BA (Hons) in History in 1964 and MA in 1965 from the University of Dhaka, and later completed an LLB degree from Dhaka Central Law College.

== Political career ==
After Bhuiyan had finished studies, Bhuiyan was briefly involved in teaching. He started his political life as an activist of Chhatra Union (Students' Union). Due to his involvement in left-oriented student politics, he was imprisoned before his degree examination. He was elected social welfare secretary of Narsingdi College Student Union in 1960. He played the role of a pioneer in the anti-Ayub movement in 1962 as one of the organizers of the then East Pakistan Chhatra Union. He was elected the organizinging secretary of East Pakistan Chhatra Union in 1964 and held the post of its general secretary for the next two years.

Bhuiyan was elected executive member of "Dhaka University Central Students Union" (DUCSU) in 1964–65. After completion of his student life he joined the National Awami Party (NAP) led by Maulana Bhashani. He played a significant role in the mass upsurge in 1969. During the Liberation War of Bangladesh in 1971, Bhuiyan put up resistance against the Pakistani occupation forces by organising thousands of local freedom fighters. He announced a vast area including Shibpur of Narsingdi free and operated from there as a commander. He was general secretary of Krishak Samity for a long time under the leadership of Maulana Bhashani. The movement for improving the condition of deprived farmers commenced under Bhuiyan's leadership.

Bhuiyan left NAP and became general secretary of United People's Party (UPP) in 1978. Later on request of the then president Ziaur Rahman he joined Bangladesh Nationalist Party in 1980. Zia nominated Bhuiyan as the convener of Jatiyatabadi Krishak Dal. He also became the agriculture secretary of BNP central committee. Mannan Bhuiyan was also an organiser of the movement against autocratic Ershad. He acted as the Bangladesh Nationalist Party joint secretary for eight and a half years since 1988.

Bhuiyan was appointed as state minister for labour and manpower in 1991 and then as a cabinet minister given the charge of food and agriculture.

On 26 June 1996, Khaleda Zia nominated Bhuiyan as the secretary general of the party. His foremost task was to reorganise the party, which he successfully carried out. Bhuiyan was the longest serving secretary general of Bangladesh Nationalist Party for 11 years.

Bhuiyan faced the toughest time during his secretary general tenure in Bangladesh Nationalist Party as the hardliners and anti-liberation elements within and outside the party strongly opposed a communist leader's becoming Bangladesh Nationalist Party's second man. He was a member of parliament for 15 years and served as Bangladesh Nationalist Party's longest serving secretary general. He was secretary general for 11 years before expelled by Khaleda Zia in September 2007. He served as labor and manpower minister (1991–1995) and the LGRD and cooperatives minister (2001–2006) of the BNP-led government. He was a member of the Jatiya Sangshad at seat number 199, and local government of Narsingdi-3. He was elected member of parliament four times back to back since the 5th Jatiya Sangsad in 1991.

=== Expelled from secretary role ===
BNP Chairperson Khaleda Zia had expelled Bhuiyan and joint general secretary Ashraf Hossain from their respective posts in September 2007. Khandaker Delwar Hossain replaced Bhuiyan's position.

== Personal life and death ==
Bhuiyan was married to Mariam Begum (1948–2021), a former professor of English and principal of Dhaka College. Together they had two sons, Bhuiyan Anindya Mohaimen Rajon and Bhuiyan Nandito Nahiyan Swajon.
