= Satirpara K.K. Institution School & College =

Satirpara Kali Kumar Institution School & College
- সাটিরপাড়া কালী কুমার ইনস্টিটিউশন স্কুল এন্ড কলেজ

Location
- Satirpara, Narsingdi Sadar, Narsingdi; Bangladesh
- 23.9180°N 90.7128°E

Information
- School type: School & College
- Established: 1901
- Founders: Lalit Mohan Ray
- School code: 3010
- Rector: Noor Hossain Bhuiyan
- Principal: Mohammed Abu Taleb
- Enrollment: 3500+
- Colors: Shirt: white, pant: navy-blue
- Sports: Cricket, football etc.
- Website: satirparakkinstitution.edu.bd

Satirpara Kali Kumar Institution School and College (Bengali: সাটিরপাড়া কালী কুমার ইনস্টিটিউশন স্কুল এন্ড কলেজ), formerly known as Satirpara K.K. Institution School and College, is an educational institution in Satirpara in Narsingdi Sadar, Narsingdi. It was established in 1901 by Lalit Mohan Ray. He named this school after his father, Kali Kumar Paul. They were the landlords of the Satirpara area.

This school was product of consciousness of the then freedom fighters. Though then it was far away from Calcutta University, the then affiliated body, took a leading role in the area for enhancing learning atmosphere. Many freedom fighters were assembled there. Freedom fighters Trailykaya Chakraborty (Maharaj), Satish Pakrashi were students of this school. Lalit Mohan Ray was activists of Anushilan Samiti. When the then British police arrested Lalit Mohan Ray, Chittaranjan Das appeared in Court to move Ray's bail petition. During Bangladesh movement, many students of this school fought for freedom in the front line. Mathematician Narayan Chandra Ghosh was student of this school.
