= Abdul Kadir Mollah City College =

Private College in Narsingdi, Bangladesh

- আবদুল কাদির মোল্লা সিটি কলেজ
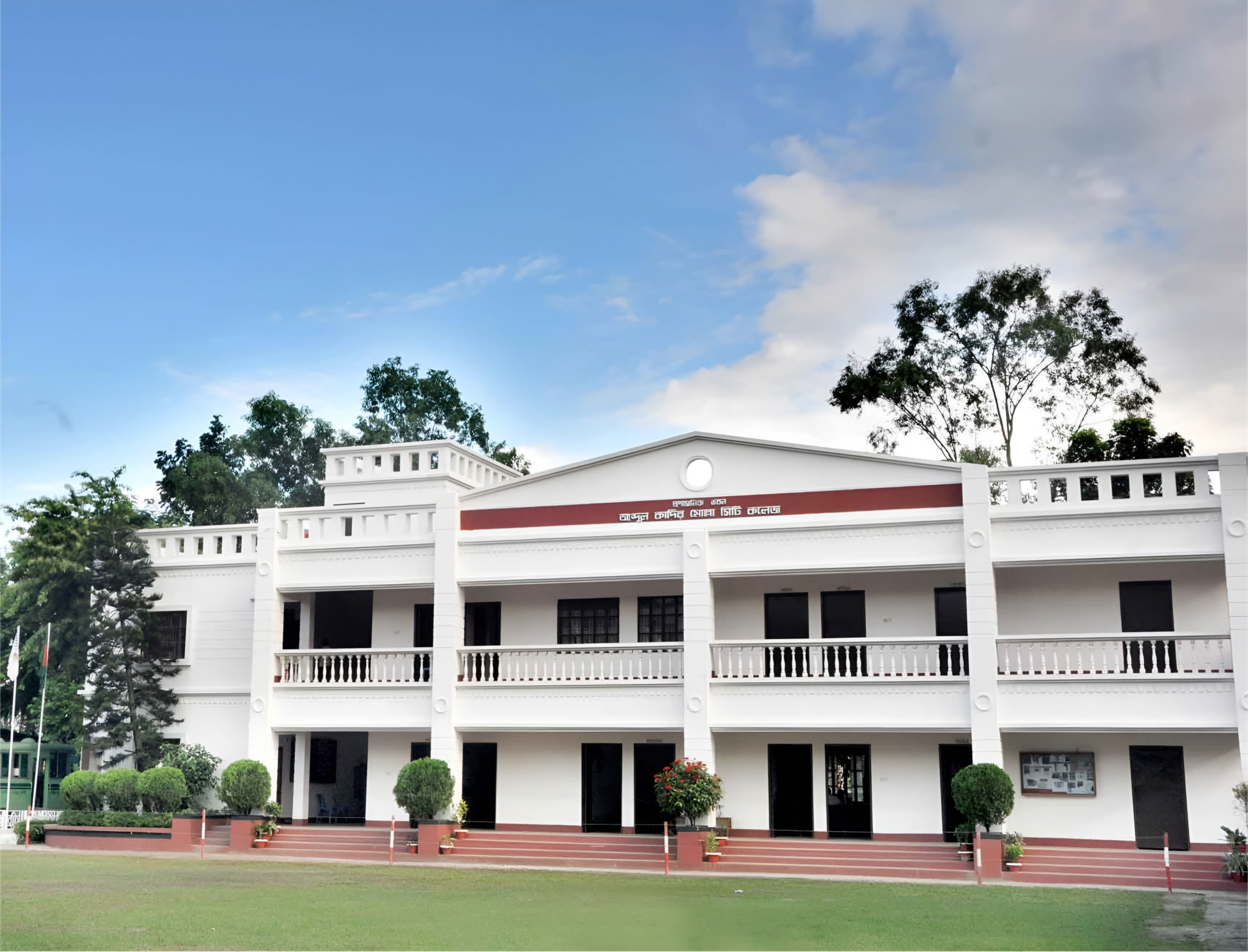
- Other name: AKMCC
- Motto: "Be AKMCCian, Be Great"
- Type: Private College
- Established: 17 June 2006; 20 years ago
- Founder: Abdul Kadir Mollah
- Chairman: Abdul Kadir Mollah
- Principal: Md. Herem Ullah Ahsan
- Faculty: 100 (approximately)
- Students: 3,300 (approximately)
- Location: Narsingdi, Dhaka, Bangladesh; 23.9255°N 90.6997°E
- Campus: Rural
- Language: Bangla
- Colors
- Website: akmcc.edu.bd

Abdul Kadir Mollah City College (Bengali: আবদুল কাদির মোল্লা সিটি কলেজ) also known as AKMCC is a private college in Bangladesh. It was established in 2006 in Narsingdi District beside the Dhaka-Sylhet highway. Its Educational Institute Identification Number(EIIN) is 132043.

== History ==
Abdul Kadir Mollah City College was founded by Abdul Kadir Mollah. He is the founder, chairman and managing director of Thermax Group Ltd. He is also the founder and chairman of the Mojid Mollah Foundation, a nonprofit charitable organization for social welfare situated in Narsingdi. Abdul Kadir Mollah City College was one of them.

== Academic performance ==
The college is renowned throughout the country for its rigorous teaching method and continuous success in board exams and university admission tests. 447 students from Abdul Kadir Mollah City College appeared in the 2015 Higher Secondary Certificate (HSC) examinations. The college achieved a 100 percent pass rate with 380 students getting GPA-5. Colleges were not ranked by results in 2015, but the college placed fifth among colleges under the Dhaka Education Board in 2009, seventh in 2011, and second in 2012, 2013, and 2014. In 2015 and 2016, the college placed in Dhaka Education Board with 100% pass rate. In 2017 and 2018, the college again placed in Dhaka Board with 100% pass rate. In 2023, the college showed an outstanding performance with 95.35% GPA-5 rate.

== Co-curricular activities ==
AKMCC Debating Club

Five club members participated in Debate for Democracy, a national-level public parliament debating competition, in 2021 and became champion. The club also organizes internal debate competitions regularly.

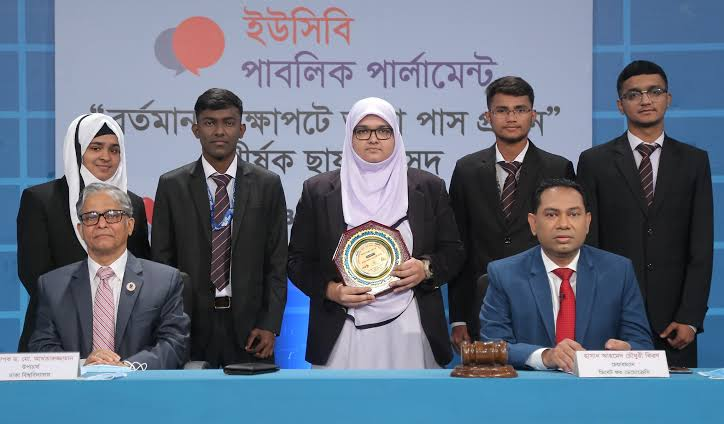
AKMCC Debating Club Members with Mr. Hassan Ahmed Chowdhury Kiron, chairman of DFD

AKMCC Rover Unit

A rover unit is being conducted in this college under the strict guidance of PE teacher Rakib Hossain. Starting in 2019, the unit quickly gained fame around the district by participating in many social welfare programs including vaccination programme during COVID-19 pandemic.

AKMCC Oikotan

Abdul Kadir Mollah City College organizes a charitable organization, Oikotan, that is led and run by AKMCC students.
