= Kamal Haider (politician) =

Bangladeshi politician (1947–2024)

- কামাল হায়দার

Member of Parliament Narsingdi-3
- In office 1986–1988
- Succeeded by: Shahjahan Saju

Personal details
- Born: 21 January 1947
- Died: 4 June 2024 (aged 77)
- Party: Gano Forum
- Other political affiliations: National Awami Party, Awami League

Kamal Haider (Bengali: কামাল হায়দার; 21 January 1947 – 4 June 2024) was a Bangladeshi politician, journalist and freedom fighter. He was a member of parliament for the Narsingdi-3 constituency.

== Biography ==
Haider was born on 21 January 1947.

He joined the Student Union and started his political career.

In 1971, he was a freedom fighter trained in the Bangladesh Liberation War.

He served as the organizing secretary of the National Awami Party.

Haider was elected to parliament from Narsingdi-3 as a National Awami Party candidate in 1986.

He participated in the anti-military popular uprising in the 1990s.

Haider died on 4 June 2024, at the age of 77.
