= Marjal Union =

Marjal Union মরজাল ইউনিয়ন
- Location within Bangladesh
- Coordinates: 24.0155°N 90.8341°E
- Country: Bangladesh
- Division: Dhaka Division
- District: Narsingdi District
- Upazila: Raipura Upazila

Government
  - Type: Union Council
- Time zone: UTC+6 (BST)

Marjal Union (Bengali: মরজাল ইউনিয়ন) is a union parishad of Raipura Upazila in Narsingdi District, Dhaka Division, Bangladesh. Its population is 11,728 men and 12,177 women, and the union's literacy rate is 48.3 per cent.
