= Uttar Bakharnagar Union =

Uttar Bakharnagar Union উত্তর বাখরনগর ইউনিয়ন
- Location within Bangladesh
- Country: Bangladesh
- Division: Dhaka Division
- District: Narsingdi District
- Upazila: Raipura Upazila

Government
  - Type: Union Council
- Time zone: UTC+6 (BST)

Uttar Bakharnagar Union (Bengali: উত্তর বাখরনগর ইউনিয়ন) is a Union of Raipura Upazila in Narsingdi District, Dhaka Division, Bangladesh. Its population is 10,860 men and 11,423 women, and the Union's literacy rate is 35.1 per cent.
