= Karnafuli (novel) =

Karnaphuli (Bengali: কর্ণফুলী) is a novel written by Alauddin Al-Azad. It was published in 1962. the author portrays the lives of various unique communities living along the banks of the Karnaphuli River.

== Plot ==
The protagonist of the story, Ismail, is essentially a rough, thug-like young man whose first occupation was pickpocketing. Impressed by his boldness, a contractor named Ramzan takes him along to the hilly region of Kaptai to assist in his work. It is there that Ismail falls in love with Rangamila, the daughter of Lal Chacha. However, due to various circumstances, he suppresses his feelings and returns home. Back home, he marries Juli and tries to settle down. But his heart never truly finds peace in domestic life. The childhood dream of becoming a ship’s captain—sareng—keeps haunting him day after day. The waves and currents of the Karnaphuli River seem to call out to him even in his dreams. And one day, the opportunity arrives. Despite the strong objections of his mother and wife, he eventually sets sail on the waters of the Karnaphuli as the sareng of a ship.

== Characters ==
=== Main characters ===
- Ismail – The protagonist of the novel. He was originally a pickpocket by profession, but his dream was to become a ship’s sareng (captain). One day, that dream comes true.
- Juli – The heroine of the novel. Ismail’s wife, who had loved him since childhood, and eventually their relationship culminates in marriage.
- Rangamila – An indigenous girl and one of the central characters. Ismail had roamed around like a madman for her love for a long time.
- Nilmoni – Son of a trader from the indigenous community, and Rangamila’s lover.
- Ramzan – Another major and cunning character in the novel.

=== Other characters ===
- Manu Bibi – Ismail’s mother
- Keramat – Juli’s father
- Lalchacha – Rangamila’s father
- Dhalabi – Rangamila’s mother
