= Daukar Char Union =

Daukar Char Union ডৌকারচর ইউনিয়ন
- Location within Bangladesh
- Coordinates: 23.9614°N 90.7795°E
- Country: Bangladesh
- Division: Dhaka Division
- District: Narsingdi District
- Upazila: Raipura Upazila

Government
  - Type: Union Council
- Time zone: UTC+6 (BST)

Daukar Char Union (Bengali: ডৌকারচর ইউনিয়ন) is a union parishad of Raipura Upazila in Narsingdi District, Dhaka Division, Bangladesh. Its population is 5,085 men and 5,470 women, and the union's literacy rate is 56.2 per cent.
