= Md. Shirajul Islam Mollah =

Bangladeshi politician

- সিরাজুল ইসলাম মোল্লা

Member of the Bangladesh Parliament for Narsingdi-3
- In office 30 January 2024 – 6 August 2024
- Preceded by: Zahirul Haque Bhuiyan Mohan
- In office 29 January 2014 – 28 January 2019
- Preceded by: Zahirul Haque Bhuiyan Mohan

Personal details
- Born: 1 July 1957 (age 67)
- Political party: Independent

Md. Shirajul Islam Mollah (born 1 July 1957) is a Bangladeshi politician and a former Jatiya Sangsad member representing the Narsingdi-3 constituency.

== Career ==
Mollah was elected to the parliament in 2014 from Narsingdi-3 as an Independent candidate. He is a member of the parliamentary standing committee on railways ministry. He is the managing director of China-Bangla Ceramic Industries Ltd. In 2013, he was elected president of Bangladesh Ceramic Wares Manufacturers Association. On 25 June 2018, he was elected chairman of Prime Bank. He is a sponsor director of the Bank.
