= Raipura Municipality =

Municipality in Narsingdi District, Bangladesh

Raipura Municipality is a municipality in Raipura Upazila, Narsingdi District, Bangladesh. It has a population of 34904. It has nine wards and 23 mahalla. Md Jamal Molya is the mayor of the Municipality.

In May 2017. four members of the Awami League in Raipura Municipality were detained by the Raipura Police Station Officer-in-charge Azharul Islam Sarkar and taken to Syedabad Ferry Ghat. The four became victims of Enforced Disappearance.
