= Narsingdi =

Municipality in Narsingdi

Narsingdi নরসিংদী
- City and Municipality
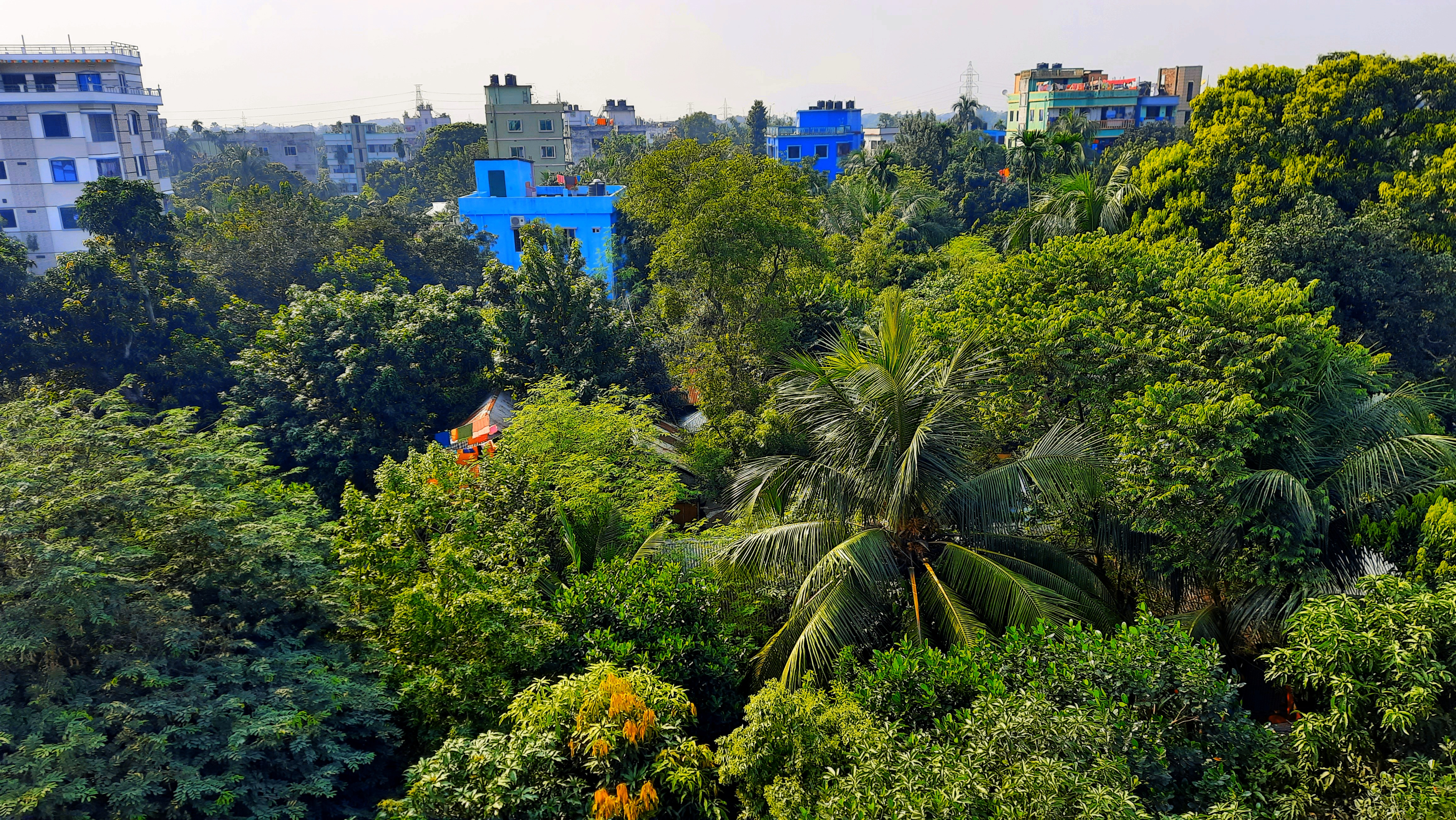
- drone view city of Narsingdi

- Location within Dhaka division Location within Bangladesh
- Coordinates: 23°55′23″N 90°42′44″E
- Country: Bangladesh
- Division: Dhaka
- District: Narsingdi
- Upazila: Narsingdi Sadar

Government
  - Type: Mayor–Council
  - Body: Narsingdi Municipal Corporation

Area
  - Total: 14.8 km^{2} (5.7 sq mi)

Population (2022)
  - Total: 180,699
  - Density: 12,200/km^{2} (31,600/sq mi)
- Time zone: UTC+6 (Bangladesh Time)
- Postal code: 1600
- National Dialing Code: +880

Narsingdi Municipality mahallah geocode map

Narsingdi (Bengali: নরসিংদী) is a city and headquarters of Narsingdi District and the Narsingdi Sadar Upazila in Dhaka Division, Bangladesh. The Dhaka–Sylhet highway connects Narsingdi with the capital and other major cities. Narsingdi is one of the most important cities for the garment industry. The city is famous for its textile craft industry.The city has a population of about 180,000 making it the 28th largest city in Bangladesh.

== Geography ==
The district is located between 24.1344° N and 90.7860° E. It is surrounded by Tarowa on the north, Hazipur on the east, the Meghna River on the south, and by Chouwala and Kamargaon on the west.

== History ==
The name Narsingdi, which translates as "lion man" in Bangla, is named after an ancient king(Nara-Singha) who was believed as strong as a lion.

=== Modern history ===
The district became a district in 1984, and before that it was a subdivision under the greater Dhaka district. The city is famous for its textile craft industry. Narsingdi is one of the most important cities for the garment industry.

== Demographics ==
Religions in Narsingdi Paurashava (2022)
Religion	Percent
Islam	86.80%
Hinduism	13.19%
Other or not stated	0.01%

According to the 2022 Bangladesh census, Narsingdi city had 44,391 households and a population of 180,711. Narsingdi had a literacy rate of 84.19%: 85.12% for males and 83.23% for females, and a sex ratio of 102.53 males per 100 females. 8.30% of the population was under 5 years of age.

According to the 2011 Bangladesh census, Narsingdi Municipality had 32,361 households and a population of 146,115. 30,982 (21.20%) were under 10 years of age. Narsingdi had a literacy rate (age 7 and over) of 67.78%, compared to the national average of 51.8%, and a sex ratio of 970 females per 1000 males.

== Education ==
There are 27 colleges and one Ib diploma program school in the Upazila, most located in Narsingdi Those inside the upazila include: Narsingdi Govt. College, Narsingdi Science College, Narsingdi Independent College, Narsingdi Govt. Mohila College, Abdul Kadir Mollah City College, Abdul Kadir Molla International School (IB) School, Baburhat Green Field College, Farida Hashem International College, Jaj Bhuiyan College, Madhabdi College, Madhabdi Digital College, Narsingdi Central College, Narsingdi Imperial College, Narsingdi Prime College, Narsingdi Udayon College, Scholastica Model College, and Shilmandi Adarsha College.

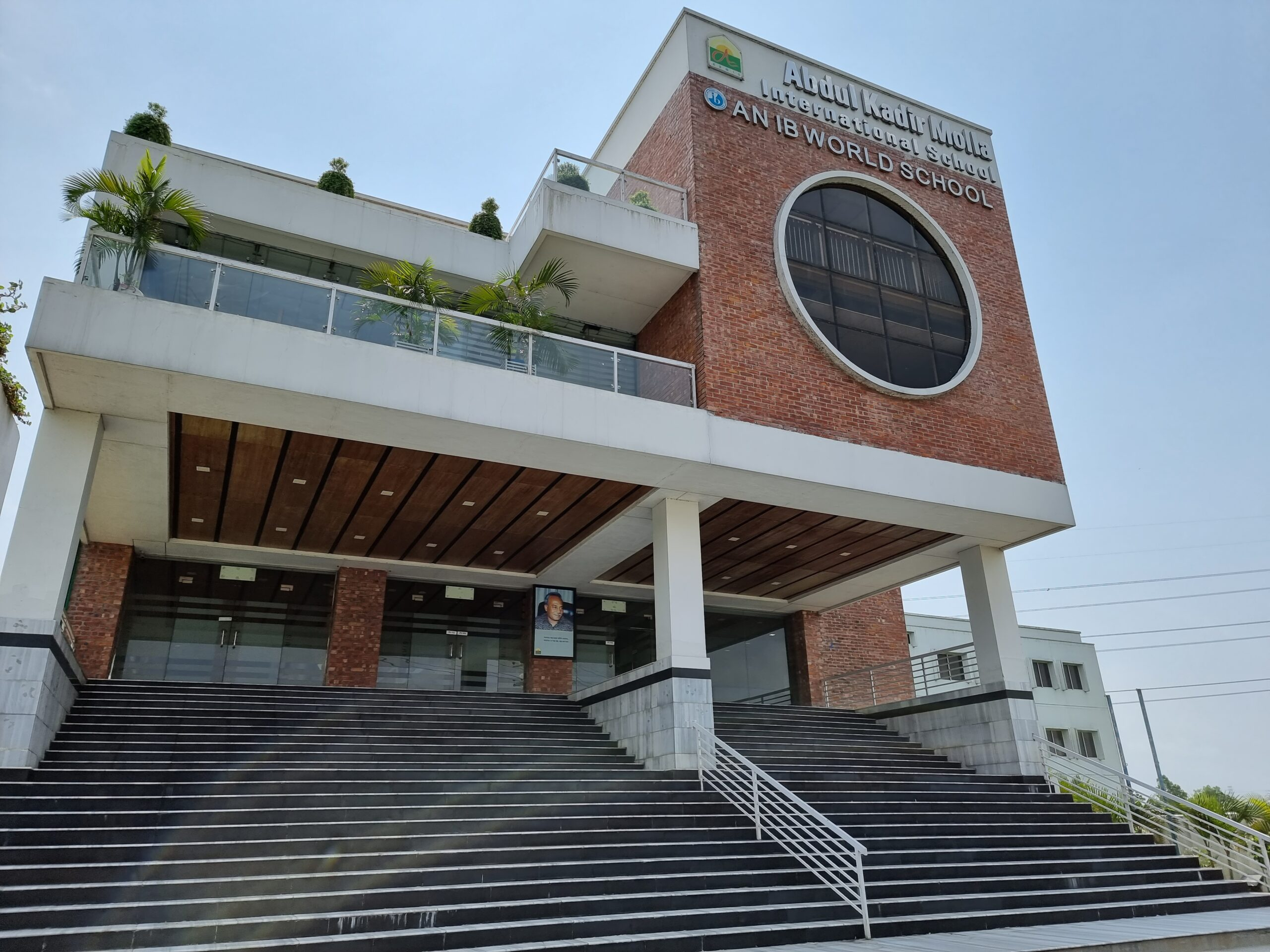
Abdul Kadir Molla International School In Narsingdi.

Notable secondary schools of the city and the district include Brahmondi K.K.M Government High School (1946), NKM High School and Homes (2008), Satirpara K.K. Institution School & College (1901), Narsingdi Govt. Girls' High School (1934), Balapur Nabin Chandra High School (1905), Charsindur Govt. High School (1919), Shibpur Govt. Pilot Model High School (1918) and Sir K.G. Gupta High School (1919).

The city also has an English medium school, offering IB PYP, A-Levels and O-levels, IBDP, and is an SAT exam centre

== Notable people ==
- Satish Pakrashi
- Alauddin Al Azad
- Girish Chandra Sen
- Somen Chanda
- Matiur Rahman (military pilot)
- AAMS Arefin Siddique
- Abdul Mannan Bhuiyan
- Badrunnesa Dalia
- Abdul Mannan (academic)
- Khairul Kabir Khokon
- Shahabuddin Ahmed (artist)
- Abdul Moyeen Khan
- Imtiaz Ahmed Nakib
- Mohammad Mostafa Kamal Raz
- Shamsur Rahman
- Alauddin Al Azad
