= BNP =

BNP may refer to:

== Politics ==
- Bahujana Nidahas Peramuna, a Sri Lankan political party
- Balochistan National Party (Awami), a political party in Balochistan, Pakistan
- Balochistan National Party (Mengal), a political party in Balochistan, Pakistan
- Bangladesh Nationalist Party, a Bangladeshi political party
- Barbados National Party, a political party in Barbados
- Basotho National Party, a political party in Lesotho
- Belarusian Independence Party (Biełaruskaja Niezaležnickaja Partyja), during World War II
- Bharatiya Navshakti Party (Indian New Force Party), an Indian political party
- British National Party (disambiguation), political parties of the same name at different times

== Places ==
- Bannu Airport, Pakistan, IATA code
- Barnstaple railway station, England, station code

== Organizations ==
- Bandai Namco Pictures
- Banque Nationale de Paris, a former French bank now part of BNP Paribas
- BNP Paribas, a French international banking group
- Biblioteca Nacional del Perú, the National Library of Peru
- Brihans Natural Products, an Indian consumer goods company

== Publications ==
- Brand New Planet, a Canadian newspaper for children
- Brill's New Pauly, an encyclopedia of classical scholarship

== Other ==
- Brain natriuretic peptide (32), a hormone secreted in response to heart abnormalities

== See also ==
- Barisan Nasional Pembebasan Patani (BNPP), an insurgent group in Southern Thailand
