= Narsingdi Sadar Upazila =

Narsingdi Sadar নরসিংদী সদর
- Upazila
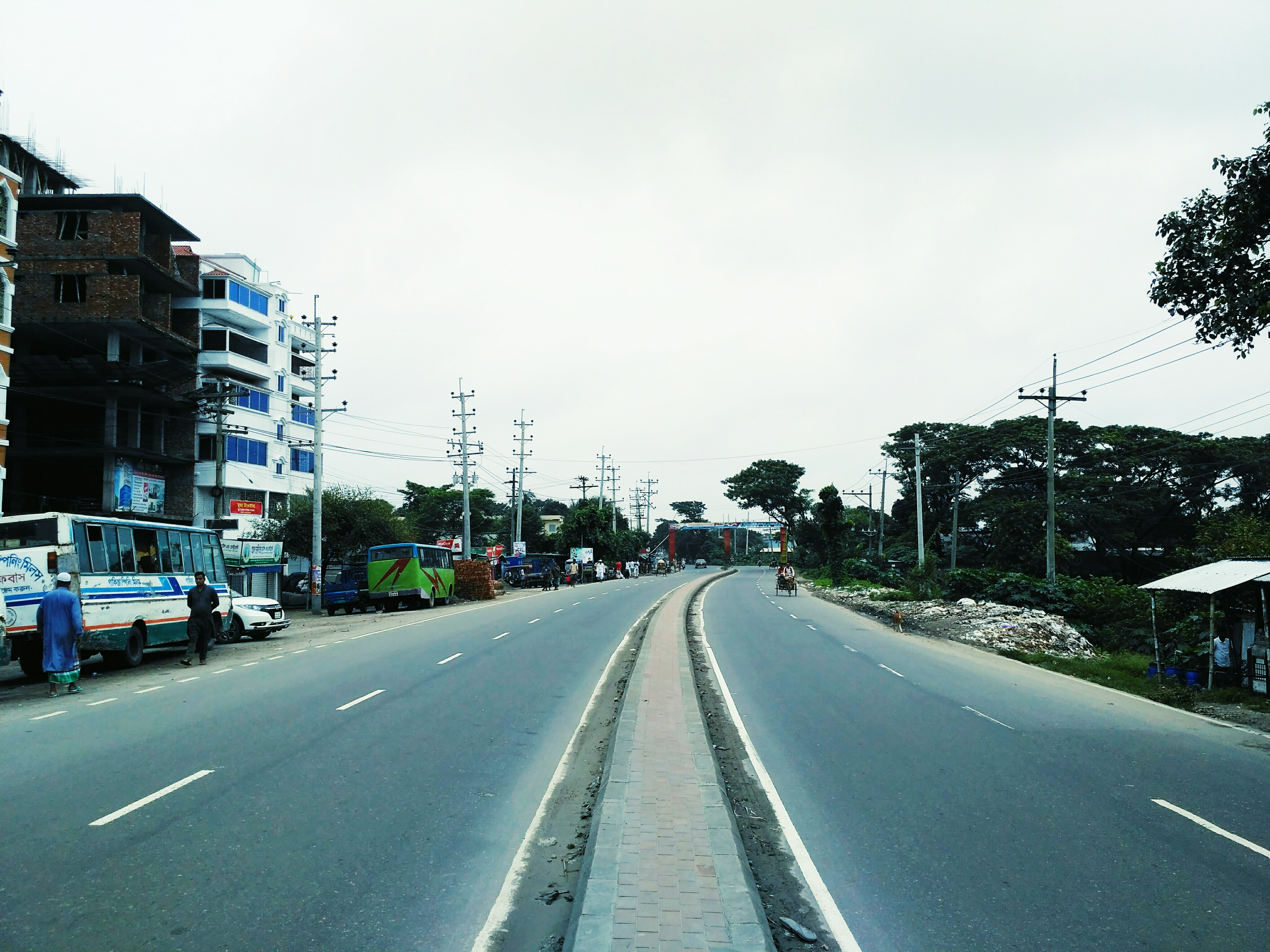
- Dhaka-Sylhet Highway, Narsingdi Sadar

- Coordinates: 23°55′N 90°43.5′E
- Country: Bangladesh
- Division: Dhaka
- District: Narsingdi

Area
  - Total: 213.43 km^{2} (82.41 sq mi)

Population (2022)
  - Total: 852,330
  - Density: 3,993.5/km^{2} (10,343/sq mi)
- Time zone: UTC+6 (BST)
- Postal code: 1600
- Area code: 0628

Narsingdi Sadar (Bengali: নরসিংদী সদর) is an upazila of Narsingdi District in the Division of Dhaka, Bangladesh.

== Geography ==
Narsingdi Sadar is located at 23.9167°N 90.7250°E. It has an area of 213.43 square kilometres (82.41 sq mi).

== Demographics ==
Religions in Narsingdi Sadar Upazila (2022)
Religion	Percent
Islam	92.99%
Hinduism	6.99%
Other or not stated	0.02%

According to the 2022 Bangladeshi census, Narsingdi Sadar Upazila had 206,224 households and a population of 852,330. 9.78% of the population were under 5 years of age. Narsingdi Sadar had a literacy rate (age 7 and over) of 75.61%: 76.84% for males and 74.35% for females, and a sex ratio of 103.59 males for every 100 females. 280,315 (32.89%) lived in urban areas.

According to the 2011 Census of Bangladesh, Narsingdi Sadar Upazila had 149,820 households and a population of 707,525. 172,113 (24.33%) were under 10 years of age. Narsingdi Sadar had a literacy rate (age 7 and over) of 50.87%, compared to the national average of 51.8%, and a sex ratio of 945 females per 1000 males. 234,711 (33.17%) lived in urban areas.

As of the 1991 Bangladesh census, Narsingdi Sadar has a population of 451335. Males constitute ~53% of the population, and females ~47%. This Upazila's eighteen up population is 226885. Narsingdi Sadar has an average literacy rate of 31% (7+ years), and the national average of 32.4% literate.

== Administration ==
Narsingdi Sadar Upazila is divided into two municipalities and 14 union parishads. The municipalities are: Madhabdi Municipality, Narsingdi Municipality; and the union parishads are: Alokbali, Amdia, Char Dighaldi, Chinishpur, Hajipur, Karimpur, Khathalia, Mahishasura, Meherpara, Nazarpur, Nuralapur, Paikarchar, Panchdona, and Silmandi. The union parishads are subdivided into 152 mauzas and 275 villages.

Madhabdi Municipality and Narsingdi Municipality are each subdivided into 9 wards.

Madhabdi is located in Narsingdi Sadar upazila, Narsingdi district, Bangladesh. The Baburhat market of Madhabdi Pourashava (municipal corporation) is one of the most famous trade centers in Bangladesh for various kind of cloths. There are many textile mills and textile-related industries situated here.

== Education ==
There are 27 colleges in the upazila, most located in Narsingdi town. Those inside the town include: Narsingdi Govt. College, Narsingdi Science College, Narsingdi Independent College, Narsingdi Govt. Mohila College, Abdul Kadir Mollah City College, Baburhat Green Field College, Farida Hashem International College, Jaj Bhuiyan College, Madhabdi College, Madhabdi Digital College, Narsingdi Central College, Narsingdi Imperial College, Narsingdi Prime College, Narsingdi Udayon College, Scholastica Model College, and Shilmandi Adarsha College.

Notable secondary schools of the town include Brahmondi K.K.M Govt High School (1946), NKM High School and Homes (2008), Satirpara K.K. Institution School & College (1901), Narsingdi Govt. Girl's High School, M.A Shahid high school (2016), Balapur Nabin Chandra High School (1905), and Sir K.G Gupta High School (1919).

== See also ==
- Upazilas of Bangladesh
- Districts of Bangladesh
- Divisions of Bangladesh
