= Raipura Upazila =

Raipura রায়পুরা
- Upazila
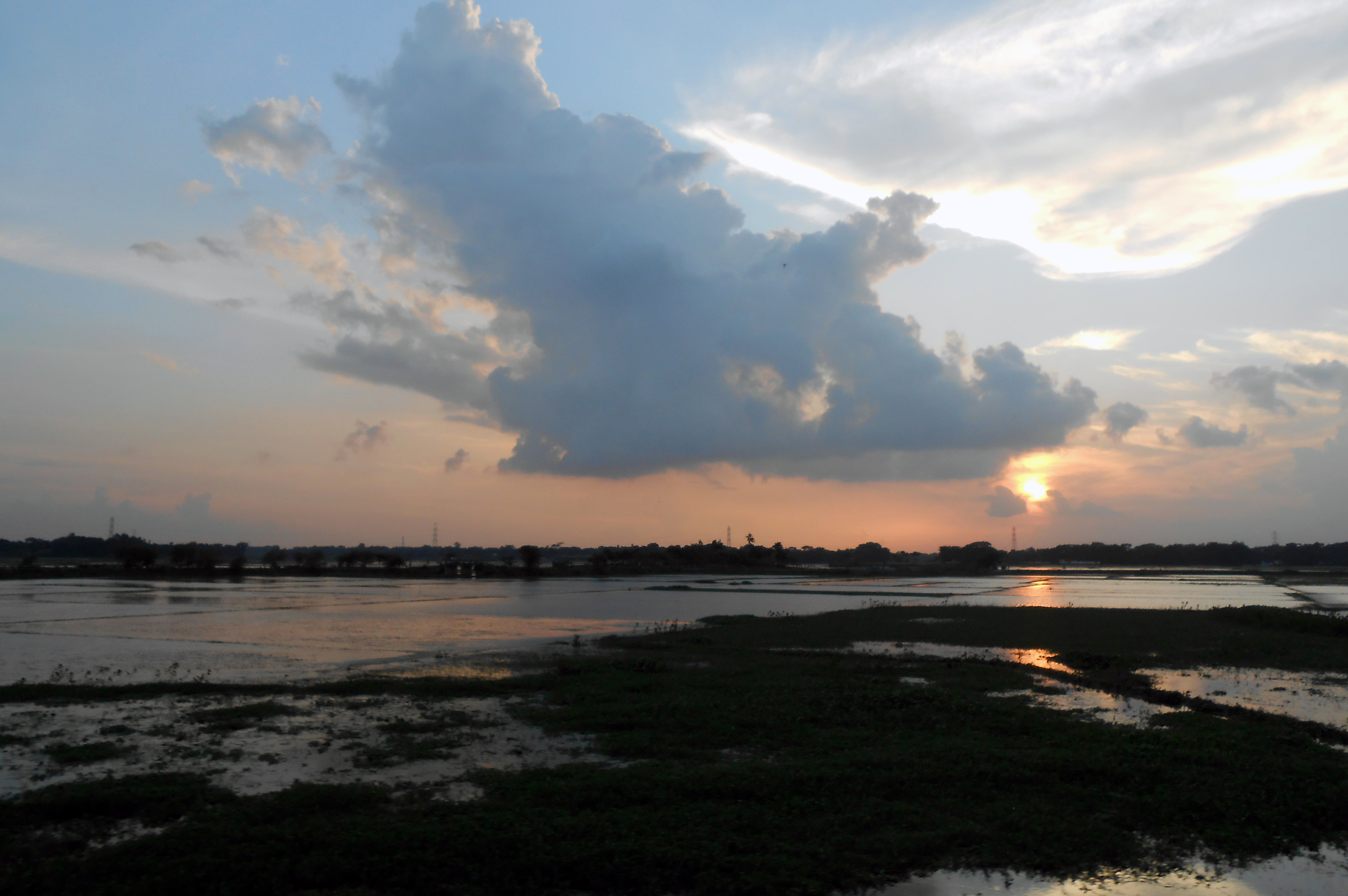
- Sunset over fields in Raipura upazila

- Coordinates: 23°58′N 90°52.5′E
- Country: Bangladesh
- Division: Dhaka
- District: Narsingdi

Government
  - MP (Narsingdi-5): Rajiuddin Ahmed Raju

Area
  - Total: 312.76 km^{2} (120.76 sq mi)

Population (2022)
  - Total: 610,602
  - Density: 1,952.3/km^{2} (5,056.4/sq mi)
- Time zone: UTC+6 (BST)
- Postal code: 1630
- Area code: 06255
- Website: Official Map of Raipura

Raipura (Bengali: রায়পুরা) is an upazila of Narsingdi District in the Narsingdi District belonging to Dhaka Division. It is the second largest upazila of Bangladesh. It is also the birthplace of notable cultural figures like film director Akhtaruzzaman and poet-filmmaker Masud Pathik.

== History ==
Raipura was established as an administrative unit in the mid 19th century. Raipura name is believed to come from a Rai family who ruled the region.

During the Bangladesh Liberation War, Pakistan Army established their base at the headquarters of the civil administration in the Upazila. A number of bridges were destroyed by the Mukti Bahini. Badrul Alam conducted bombing operations in Akhaura, Sylhet, and Raipura in Narsingdi. On 12 December 1971, the Upazila was liberated from the occupying Pakistan Army.

In 2009, Advocate Yunus Ali Bhuiyan and Sammilito Nagorik Samaj along with others demanded the government turn Raipura Upazila into a district.

== Demographics ==
Religions in Raipura Upazila (2022)
Religion	Percent
Islam	96.56%
Hinduism	3.44%

According to the 2022 Bangladeshi census, Raipura Upazila had 139,637 households and a population of 610,602. 11.57% of the population were under 5 years of age. Raipura had a literacy rate (age 7 and over) of 70.67%: 71.61% for males and 69.85% for females, and a sex ratio of 89.68 males for every 100 females. 151,629 (24.83%) lived in urban areas.

According to the 2011 Census of Bangladesh, Raipura Upazila had 110,520 households and a population of 535,796. 159,760 (29.82%) were under 10 years of age. Raipura had a literacy rate (age 7 and over) of 40.50%, compared to the national average of 51.8%, and a sex ratio of 1069 females per 1000 males. 44,459 (8.30%) lived in urban areas.

At the 1991 census Raipura had a population of 413,766, of which 204,212 were aged 18 or older. Males constituted 51.58% of the population, and females 48.42%. Raipura had an average literacy rate of 22.5% (7+ years), against the national average of 32.4%.

== Administration ==
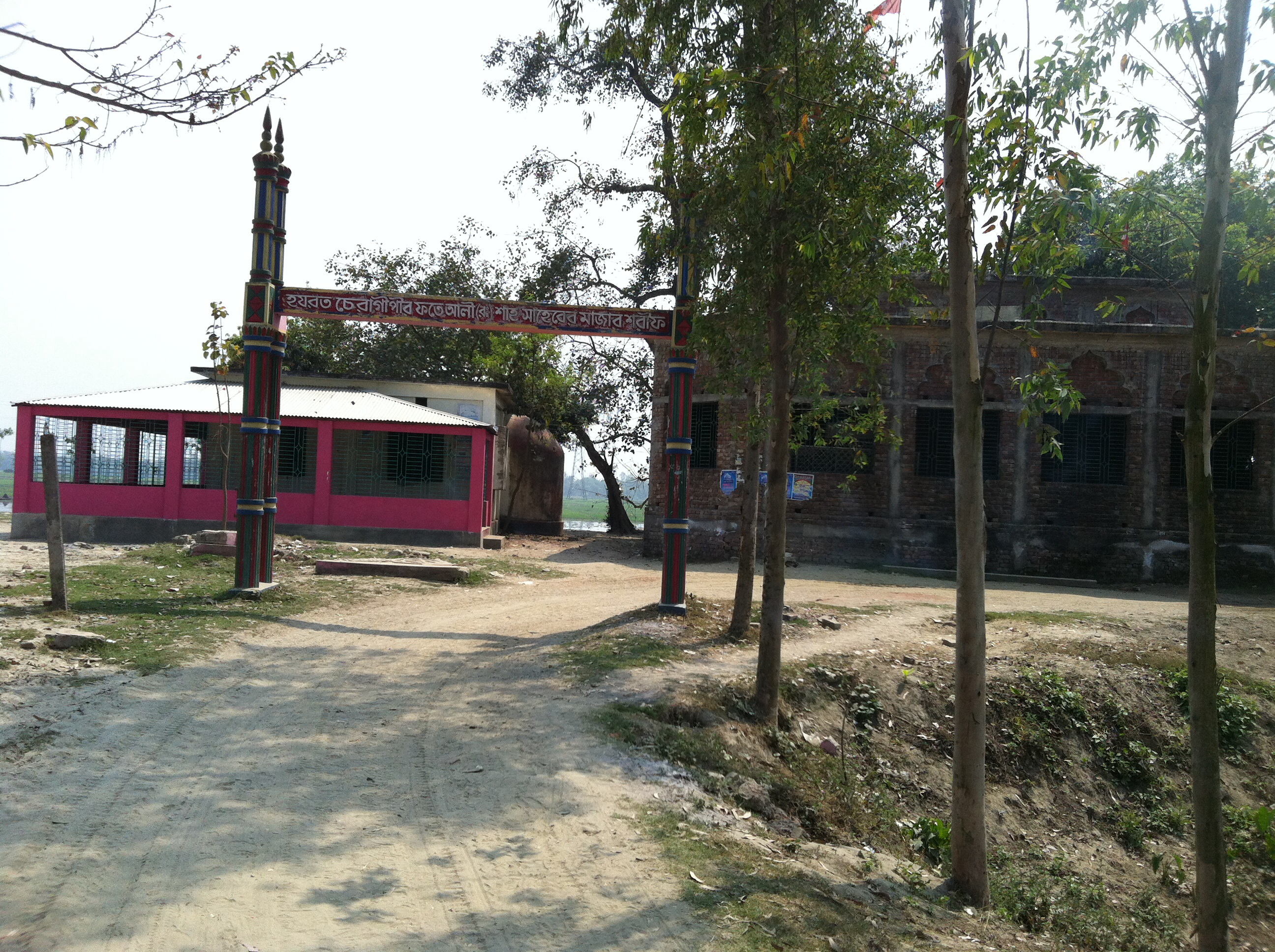
Gate of the Mazar (mausoleum) of Chiraghi Pir Fateh Ali Shah in Pirpur

Raipura Upazila is divided into Raipura Municipality and 24 union parishads: Amirganj, Adiabad, Alipura, Banshgari, Chander Kandi, Chandpur, Char Aralia, Char Madhua, Char Subuddi, Daukar Char, Hairmara, Maheshpur, Morjal, Mirzanagar, Mirzapur, Mirzarchar, Musapur, Nilakhya, Palashtali, Paratali, Radhanagar, Raipura Union, Sreenagar, and Uttar Bakharnagar. The union parishads are subdivided into 107 mauzas and 239 villages.

Raipura Municipality is subdivided into 9 wards and 23 mahallas.

Raipura falls under the Narsingdi-5 constituency of the parliament of Bangladesh. It is represented in parliament by Razi Uddin Ahmed of the Awami League. Laila Kaniz is the chairman of the Upazila.

== Education ==
According to Banglapedia notable educational institutions include Adarsha Technical Training College, Abdullapur High School, Char Subuddi Junior High School, Char Subuddi Dakhil Madrasa, Daulatkandi Mohiuddin High School, Islampur Hamidia Dakhil Madrasa, Khidirpur High School, Primary Teachers Training Institute, Pirijkandi High School, Raipura Degree College, Raipura Government Technical Vocational Institute, Raipura RKRM High School, RM High School, Raipura Pilot Girls' High School, Raipura Upazila Dakhil Madrasa, Sirajnagar MA Pilot High School, and Veluar Char Nimna Secondary School.mahmudabad Rajiuddin ahmed raju high school and college

== Notable residents ==
- Matiur Rahman, recipient of the highest military award of Bangladesh, Bir Shreshtho
- Farida Yasmin, president of Jatiya Press Club and member of parliament
- Rajiuddin Ahmed Raju, veteran student leader and member of parliament

== See also ==
- Upazilas of Bangladesh
- Districts of Bangladesh
- Divisions of Bangladesh
