= Abdul Ali Mridha =

Bangladeshi politician (died 2019)

- আবদুল আলী মৃধা

Member of the Bangladesh Parliament for Narsingdi-5
- In office 1991–1996

Personal details
- Died: 9 March 2019
- Party: Bangladesh Nationalist Party
- Occupation: Politician

Abdul Ali Mridha was a Bangladeshi politician. He was elected as MP of Narsingdi-5 constituency in 5th and 6th general election of Bangladesh. He died on 9 March 2019.
