= Alauddin Al-Azad =

Bangladeshi author, novelist, and poet

- আলাউদ্দিন আল আজাদ
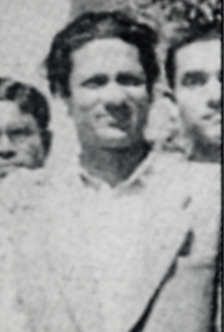
- Azad in 1954
- Born: 6 May 1932; Dhaka, Bengal Presidency, British India
- Died: 3 July 2009 (aged 77); Dhaka, Bangladesh
- Education: Dhaka College; University of Dhaka; London University

Alauddin Al-Azad (6 May 1932 – 3 July 2009) was a modern Bangladeshi author, novelist, and poet.

== Early life and education ==
Azad was born in Dhaka. He Passed Secondary School Certificate and Higher Secondary School Certificate in 1947 and 1949 respectively. From Dhaka University he earned his BA (Honors) and MA in 1953 and 1954. He received his PhD from London University in 1970 for his work Iswar Gupter Jeebon o Kabita. Also he was a first secretary of Bangladesh High Commission in Moscow. He died on 3 July 2009, in Uttara Thana.

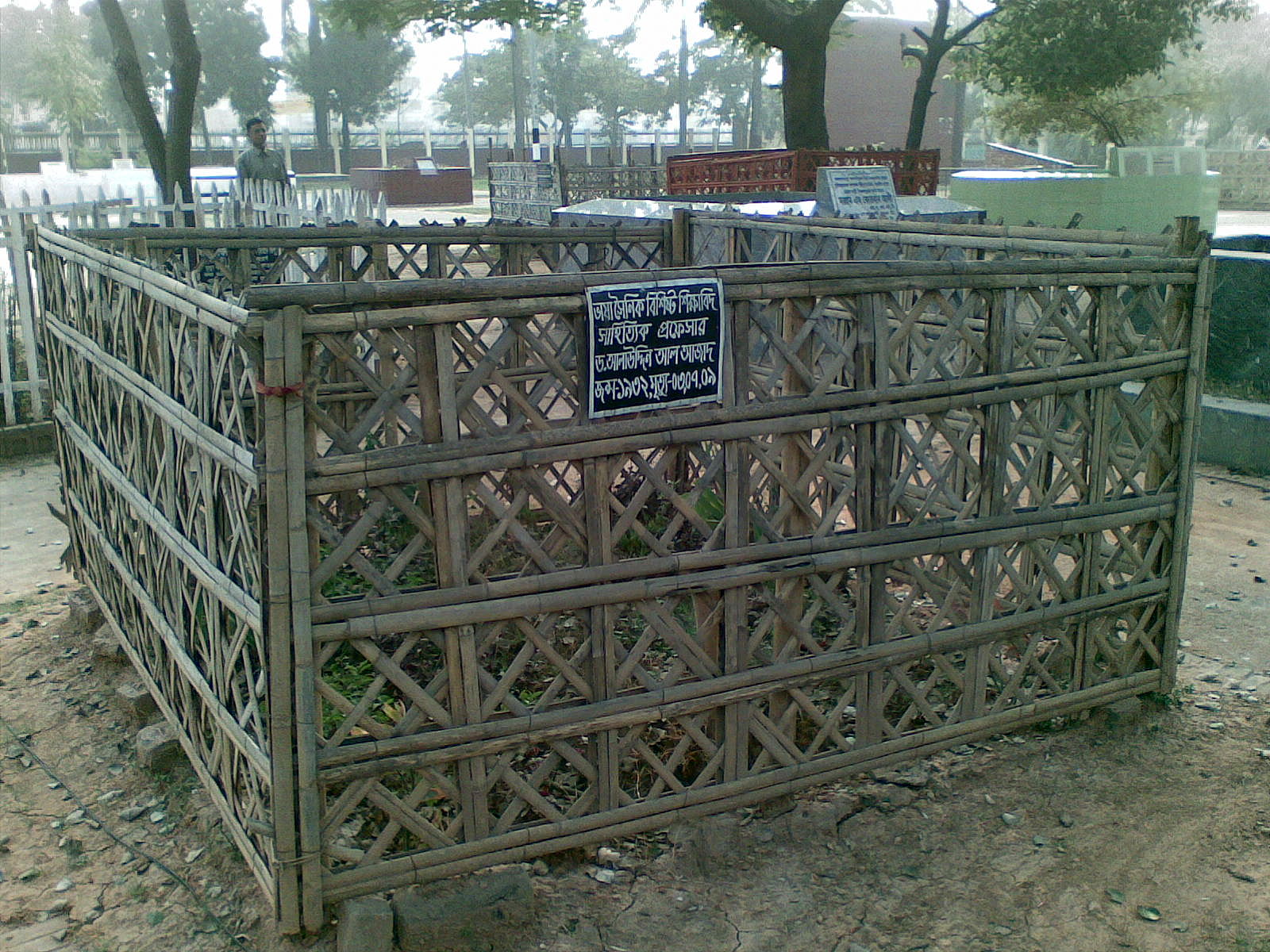
Grave of Azad in Martyred Intellectuals Graveyard, Mirpur

== Works ==
His literary works were included in the curriculum of school level, secondary, higher secondary and graduation level Bengali Literature in Bangladesh.

=== Novels ===
- Teish Nambor Toilochitra (Oil Painting Number Twenty Three, 1960)
- Shiter Sheshrat Basanter Pratham Din (Last Night of Winter First Day of Spring, 1962)
- Karnaphuli(Karnafuli river 1962)
- Khuda O Asha (Hunger and Hope, 1964)
- Khashra Kagoj (Papers for Rough Sketch, 1986)
- Shyam Chhayar Songbad (Intimations of Green Shadows, 1986);
- Jyotsnar Ajana Jiban (Unknown Life of Jyotsna, 1986)
- Jekhane Danriye Achi (The Spot I Stand on, 1986)
- Swagatam Bhalobasha (Welcome, Love, 1990)
- Apar Joddhara (Other Soldiers, 1992)
- Purana Polton (1992)
- Antarikshe Briksharaji (Trees in the Sky, 1992)
- Priya Prince (Dear Prince, 1995)
- Campus (1994)
- Anudita Andhokar (Translated Darkness, 1991)
- Swapnoshila (Dreamstone, 1992)
- Kalo Jyotsnay Candramallika (Candramallika in Dark Moonlight, 1996)
- Bishrinkhala (Chaos, 1997)
- Nirbachito Bangla Choty Golpo

=== Stories ===
- Jege Achi
- Dhankannya
- Mrigonavi
- Andhokar Shiri
- Ujan Taronge
- Jakhan Saykat
- Amar Rokto swapno amar
- জীবনজমিন

=== Poems ===
- Manchitra
- Vorer Nodir Mohonay Jagoron
- Surjo Jalar Swapan
- jouno golpo somogro
- লেলিহান পান্ডুলিপি
- নিখোঁজ সনেটগুচ্ছ
- সাজঘর

=== Drama ===
- Ehuder Meye
- Morokkor Jadukar
- Dhanyabad
- Mayabi Prohor
- Songbad Sesangsho

=== Essays ===
- Shilper Sadhona
- Sahittyer Sguntok Ritu

=== Book on Liberation War ===
- Ferrari Diary [1978]

== Awards ==
- Bangla Academy Literary Award (1965)
- UNESCO Award (1965)
- National Film Award (1977)
- Sight and Film Award (1977)
- Abul Kalam Shamsuddin Literary Award (1983)
- Abul Mansur Ahmad Literary Award (1984)
- Lekhika Sangha Award (1985)
- Rangdhanu Award (1985)
- Alakta Literary Award (1986)
- Ekushey Padak (1986)
- Sher-e-Bangla Literary Award (1987)
- Natyasava Baktitya Award (1989)
- Kathak Academy Award, (1989)
- Kalacakra Medal (1988–89)
- Lok Forum Gold Medal (1990)
- Deshbandhu Chittaranjan Das Gold Medal (1994)
