= Zahirul Haque Bhuiyan Mohan =

Bangladeshi politician

Member of Bangladesh Parliament

Personal details
- Political party: Bangladesh Awami League

Zahirul Haque Bhuiyan Mohan (Bengali: জহিরুল হক ভুঁইয়া মোহন) is a Bangladesh Awami League politician and former member of parliament for Narsingdi-3.

== Early life ==
Mohan was born 30 December 1956 and has a Bachelor of Arts degree.

== Career ==
Mohan was elected to parliament from Narsingdi-3 as a Bangladesh Awami League candidate 30 December 2018.
