= Narsingdi District =

Narsingdi District নরসিংদী জেলা
- District of Bangladesh
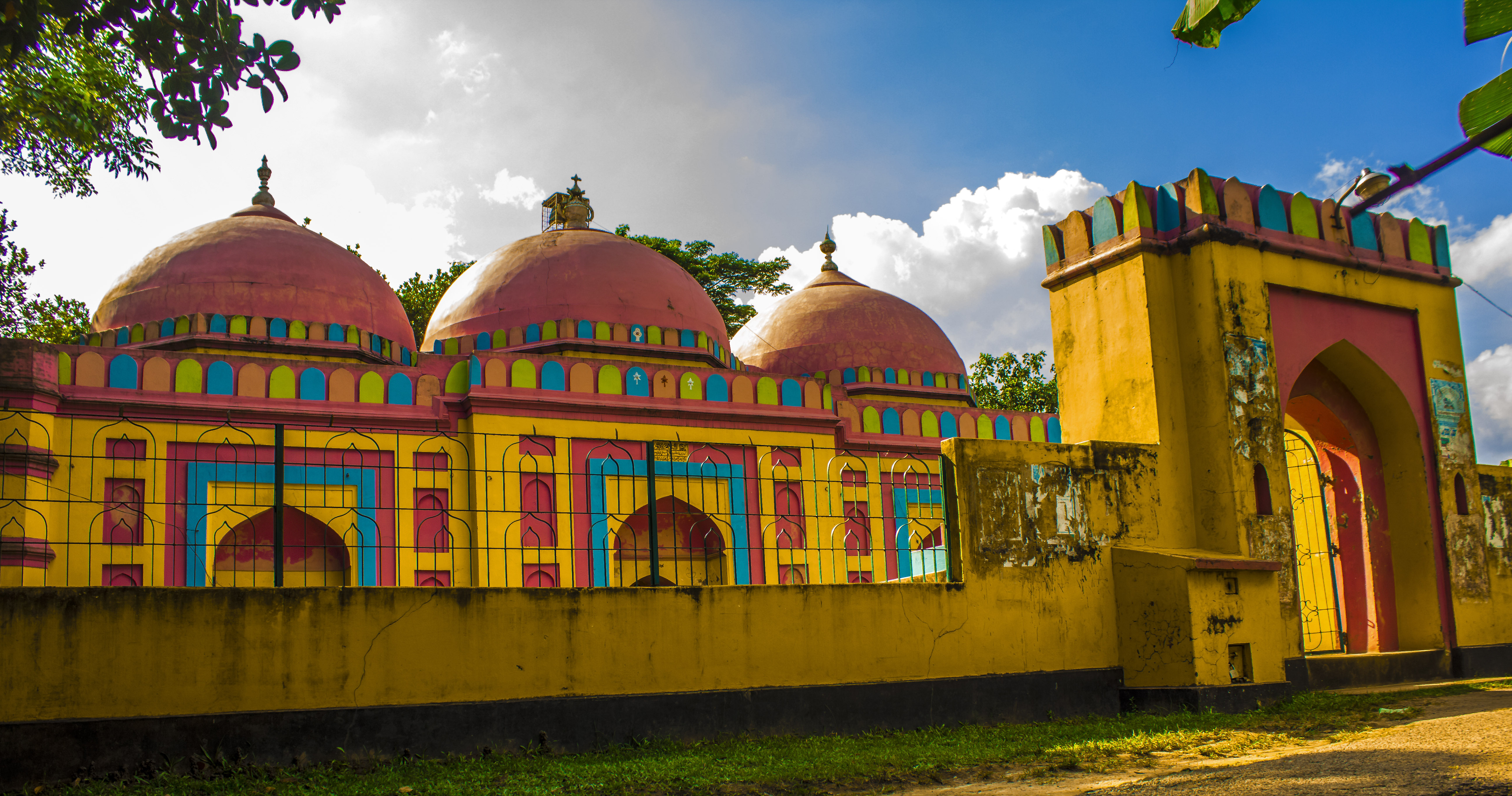
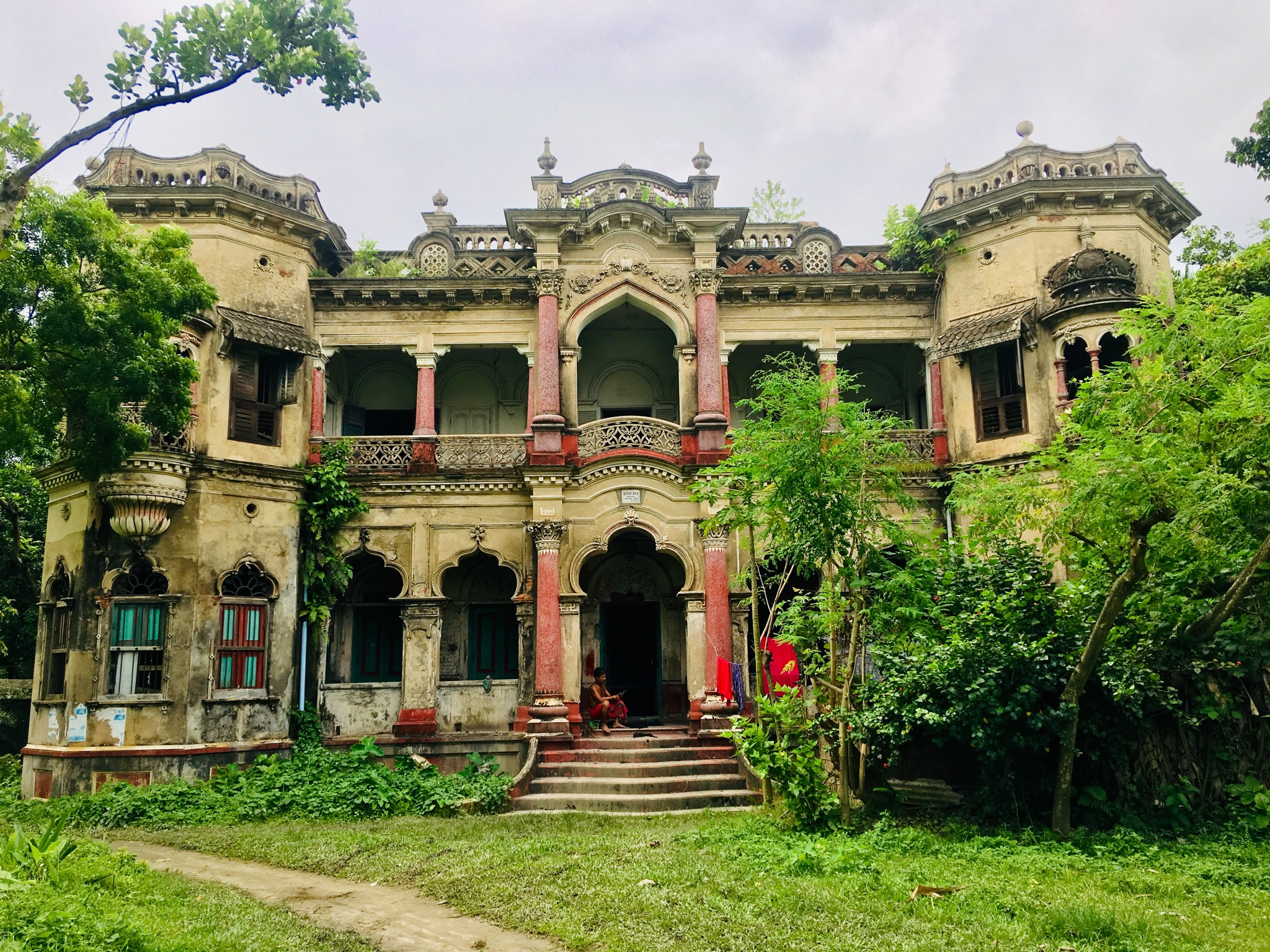
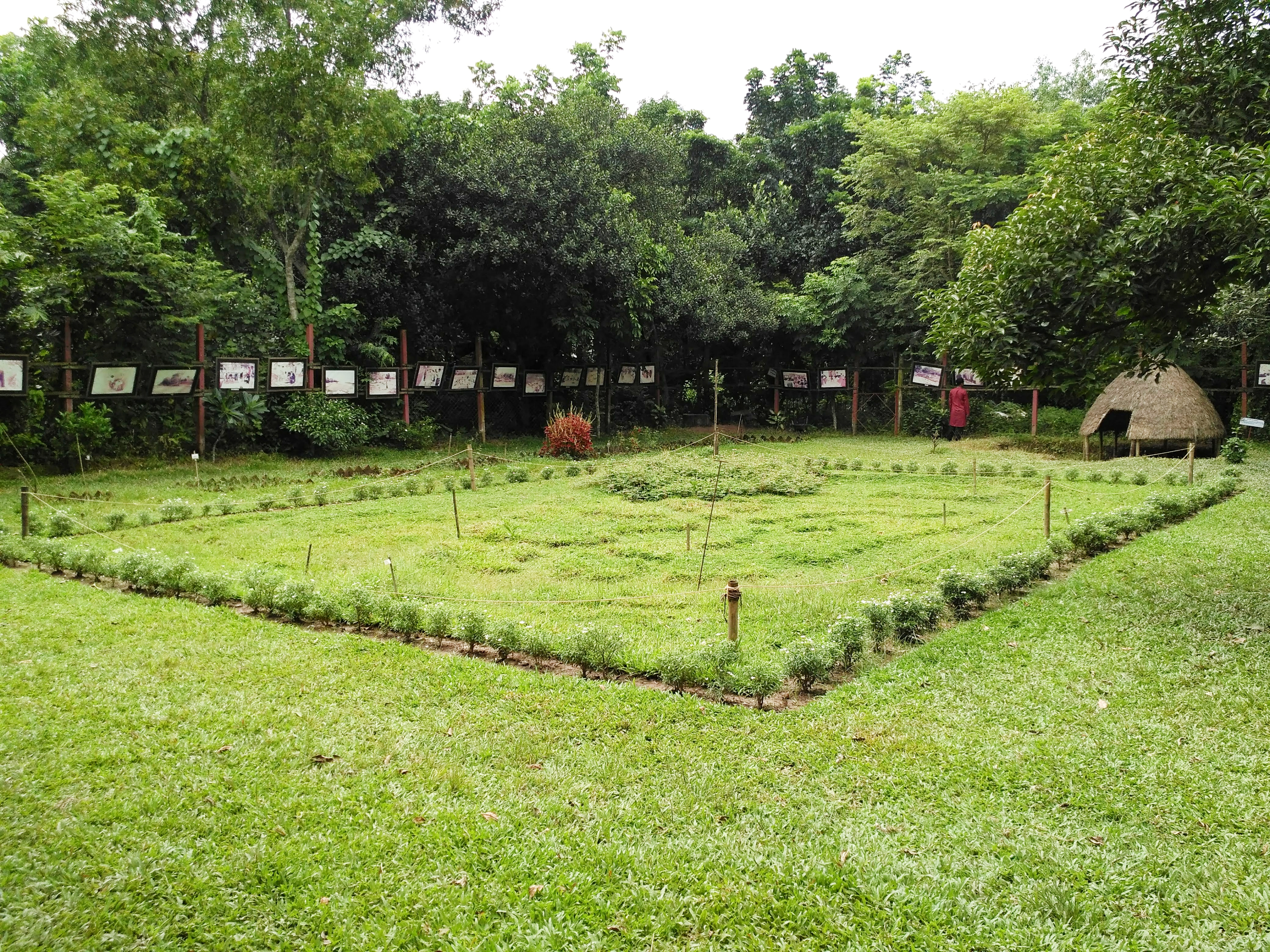
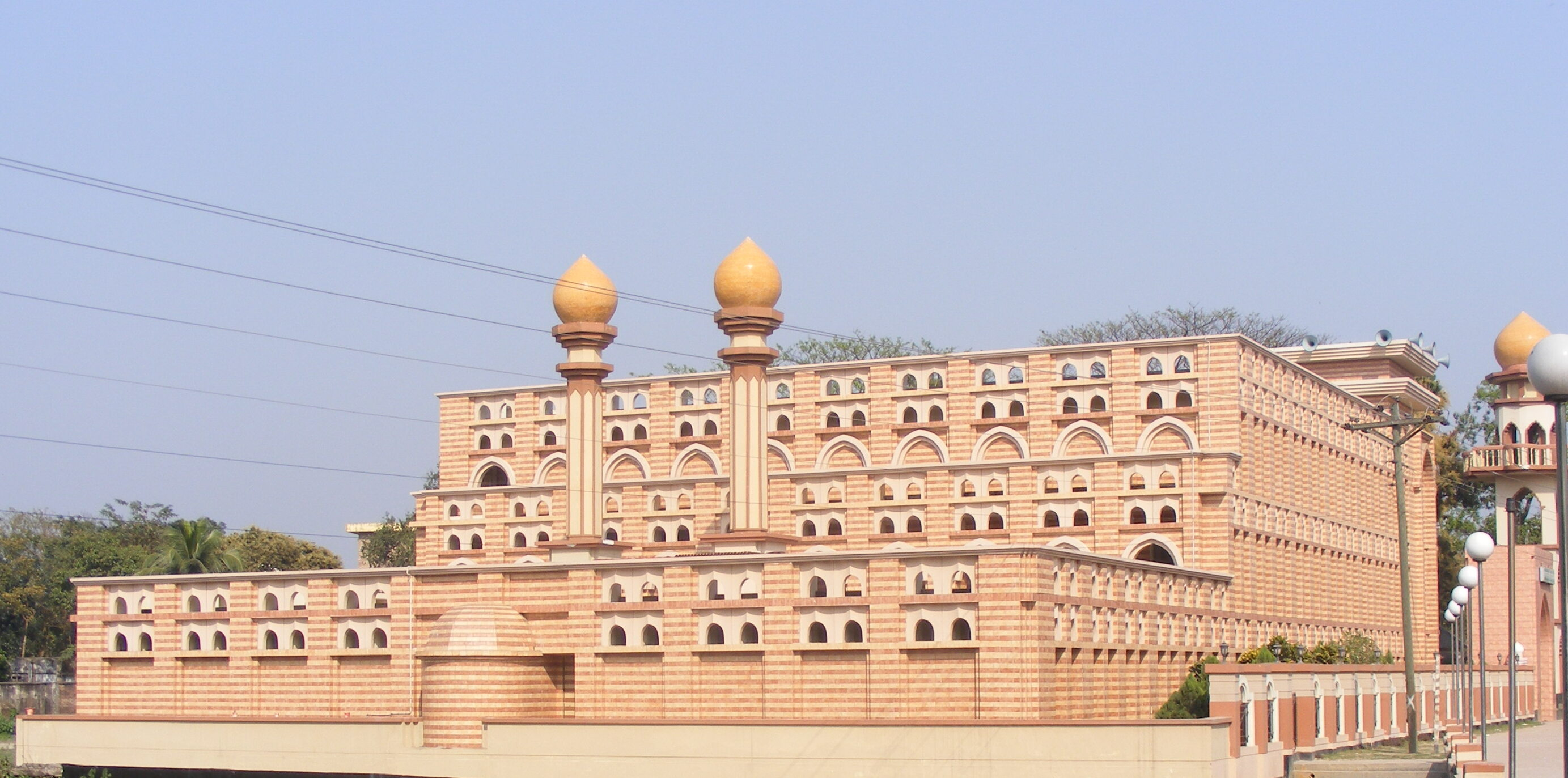
- Clockwise from top-left: Parulia Shahi Mosque, Wari-Bateshwar ruins, Narsingdi Jame Mosque, A Zamindar house

- Location of Narsingdi District in Bangladesh
- Expandable map of Narsingdi District
- Coordinates: 23.92°N 90.73°E
- Country: Bangladesh
- Division: Dhaka
- Headquarters: Narsingdi

Government
  - Deputy Commissioner: Israt Jahan Keya

Area
  - Total: 1,150.14 km^{2} (444.07 sq mi)

Population (2022)
  - Total: 2,584,452
  - Density: 2,247.08/km^{2} (5,819.90/sq mi)
- Time zone: UTC+06:00 (BST)
- Postal code: 1600
- Area code: 0621
- ISO 3166 code: BD-42
- HDI (2018): 0.668 medium · 7th of 20
- Website: narsingdi.gov.bd

Narsingdi District (Bengali: নরসিংদী জেলা) is a district in central Bangladesh. It is located 50 km north-east of Dhaka, the Bangladeshi capital. It is a part of Dhaka Division. The district is famous for its textile craft industry. Narsingdi is bordered by Kishoreganj in the north and north-east, Brahmanbaria in the east and south-east, Narayanganj in the south and south-west and Gazipur in the west.

== History ==
The district is home to one of the earliest archaeological sites in Bangladesh, the Wari-Bateshwar ruins. These ruins, dating to the early 2nd millennium BCE, represent one of the earliest urban centres in South Asia. Currency of the Mauryan form has been found here, suggesting the region was under the influence of the Mauryas. In the early medieval period, the region fell under the control of the Palas and later Senas, before being conquered like the rest of the Dhaka area by the Muslims, and became part of a province of the Delhi Sultanate administered from nearby Sonargaon.

Eventually the armour-bearer Fakhruddin Mubarak Shah formed a short-lived sultanate centred at Sonargaon which included Narsingdi, but he was soon defeated by the Ilyas Shahi dynasty. Then Narsingdi became part of the Bengal Sultanate. It remained under the Bengal Sultanate until the Battle of Rajmahal, when the Mughals took control. However, in truth the region remained under the control of the zamindar Isa Khan, who contested Mughal rule in East Bengal. After his death and the surrender of his son, the southern parts of what is now Narsingdi district became part of the Sarkar of Sonargaon while northern parts became part of the Sarkar of Bazuha. After the East India Company conquered Bengal, they made the region part of the Dacca District. In 1984, as part of the ongoing decentralisation programme, Narsingdi was made a separate district.

== Geography ==
The district is situated in the floodplain of the Old Brahmaputra and the Meghna and is relatively flat. The terrain is made up almost entirely of alluvial soil.

=== Rivers ===
The Meghna, the Shitalakshya, the old Brahmaputra, Arial Kha, Haridhoa, and Paharea are some of the main rivers that flow through this district.

The Meghna lies on the east of the district, forming the border with Brahmanbaria district. Towards the top of the district it splits into two channels, which remerge downstream, creating an island in the middle.

The Old Brahmaputra river forms the northern border of the district with Kishoreganj district as it flows southeast. Formerly the main channel of the Brahmaputra, it merges into the Meghna at the corner of the district.

The Shitalakshya river forms the western border of the district. A distributary of the Old Brahmaputra, it flows southwest along the Narsingdi district border before entering Narayanganj district.

== Subdivisions ==
Narsingdi District upazila geocode map

There are six upazilas, or subdivisions, in the Narsingdi district.

- Belabo Upazila
- Monohardi Upazila
- Narsingdi Sadar Upazila
- Palash Upazila
- Raipura Upazila
- Shibpur Upazila

== Demographics ==
Historical population
Year	Pop.	±% p.a.
1974	1,101,154	—
1981	1,328,117	+2.71%
1991	1,652,123	+2.21%
2001	1,895,984	+1.39%
2011	2,224,944	+1.61%
2022	2,584,452	+1.37%

According to the 2022 Census of Bangladesh, Narsingdi District had 621,511 households and a population of 2,584,452 with an average 4.09 people per household. Among the population, 520,051 (20.12%) inhabitants were under 10 years of age. The population density was 2,247 people per km^{2}. Narsingdi District had a literacy rate (age 7 and over) of 74.81%, compared to the national average of 74.80%, and a sex ratio of 1041 females per 1000 males. Approximately, 24.92% of the population lived in urban areas. The ethnic population was 508.

Religion in present-day Narsingdi District
Religion	1941 (Note: Narsingdi, Raipura, Shibpur, and Monohardi thanas of Dhaka district)		1981		1991		2001		2011		2022	
Religion	Pop.	%	Pop.	%	Pop.	%	Pop.	%	Pop.	%	Pop.	%
Islam	555,975	84.84%	1,236,401	93.09%	1,542,417	93.36%	1,781,817	93.98%	2,098,829	94.33%	2,443,210	94.53%
Hinduism	99,197	15.14%	90,561	6.82%	106,057	6.42%	112,900	5.95%	125,769	5.65%	139,832	5.41%
Others (Note: Including Jainism, Christianity, Buddhism, Zoroastrianism, Judaism, Ad-Dharmis, or not stated)	128	0.02%	1,155	0.09%	3,649	0.22%	1,267	0.07%	346	0.02%	1,410	0.06%
Total Population	655,300	100%	1,328,117	100%	1,652,123	100%	1,895,984	100%	2,224,944	100%	2,584,452	100%

== Notable people ==
- Alauddin Al Azad, recipient of the Bangla Academy Literary Award and Ekushey Padak
- Anwarul Ashraf Khan
- Ashraf Uddin Khan
- Girish Chandra Sen
- M.A.N. Siddique
- Md. Touhid Hossain, Adviser for Foreign Affairs to the Interim government of Bangladesh
- Masud Pathik
- Matiur Rahman
- Satish Pakrashi
- Somen Chanda
- Shamsur Rahman

== Gallery ==
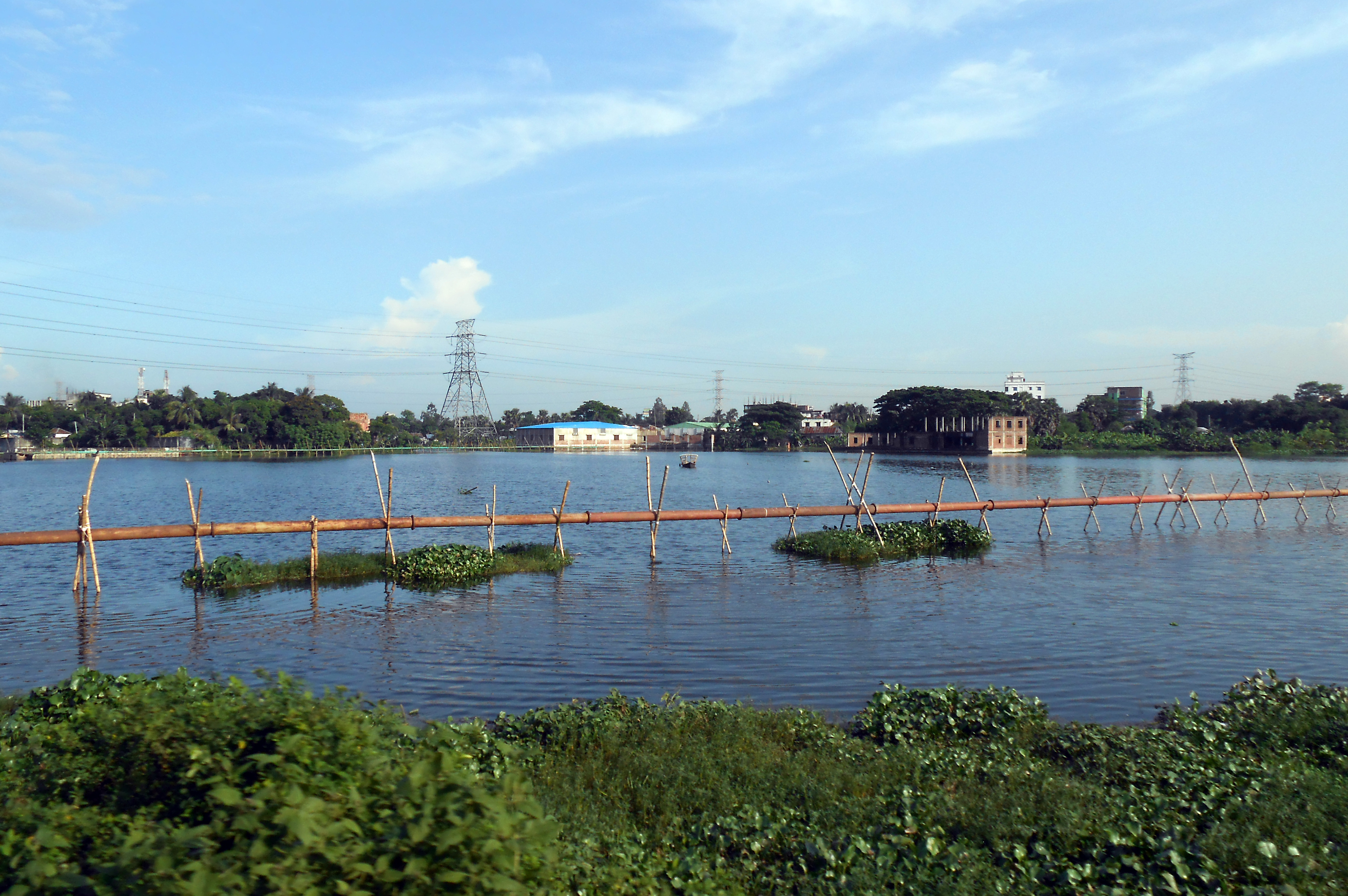

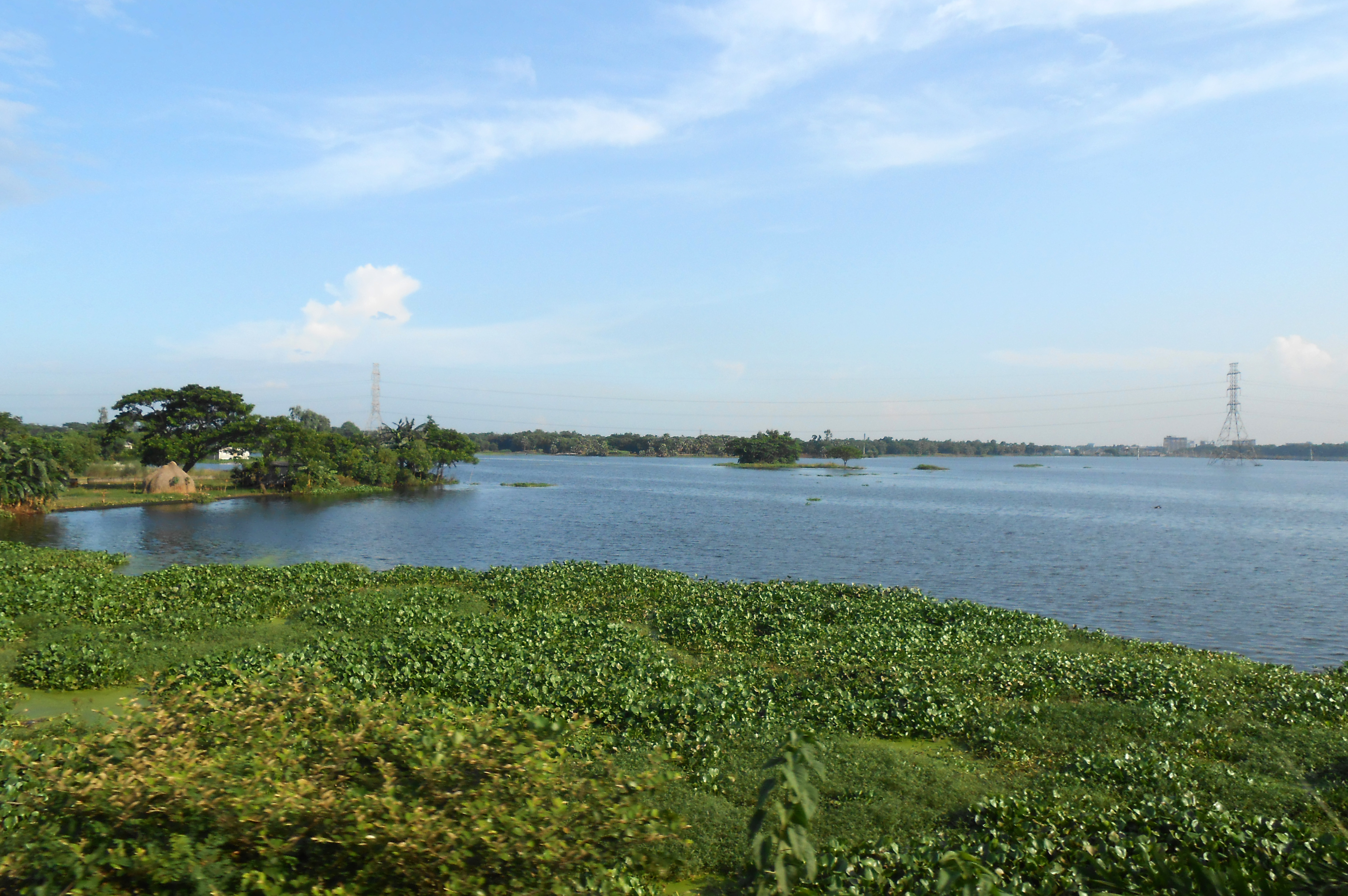

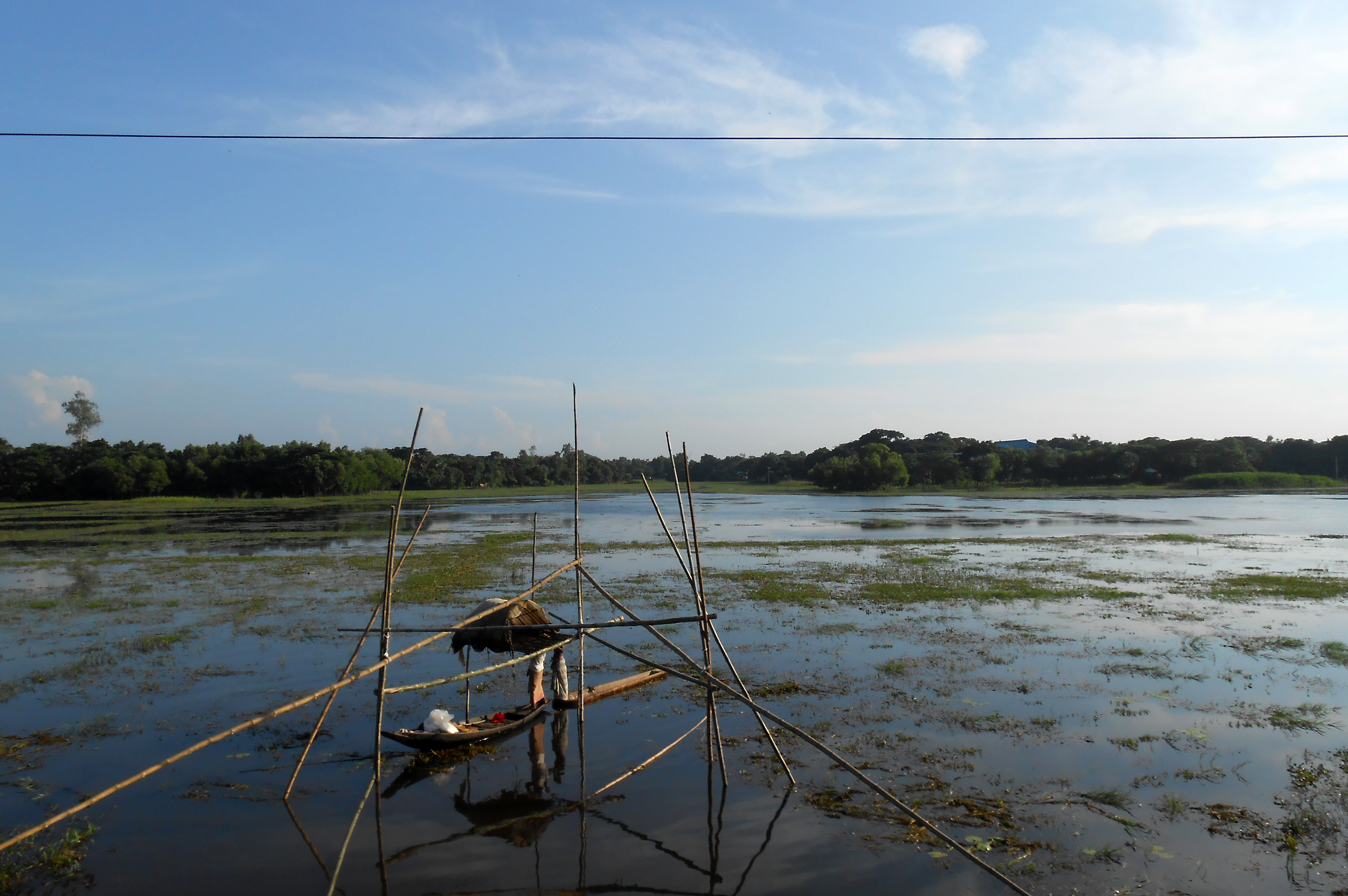

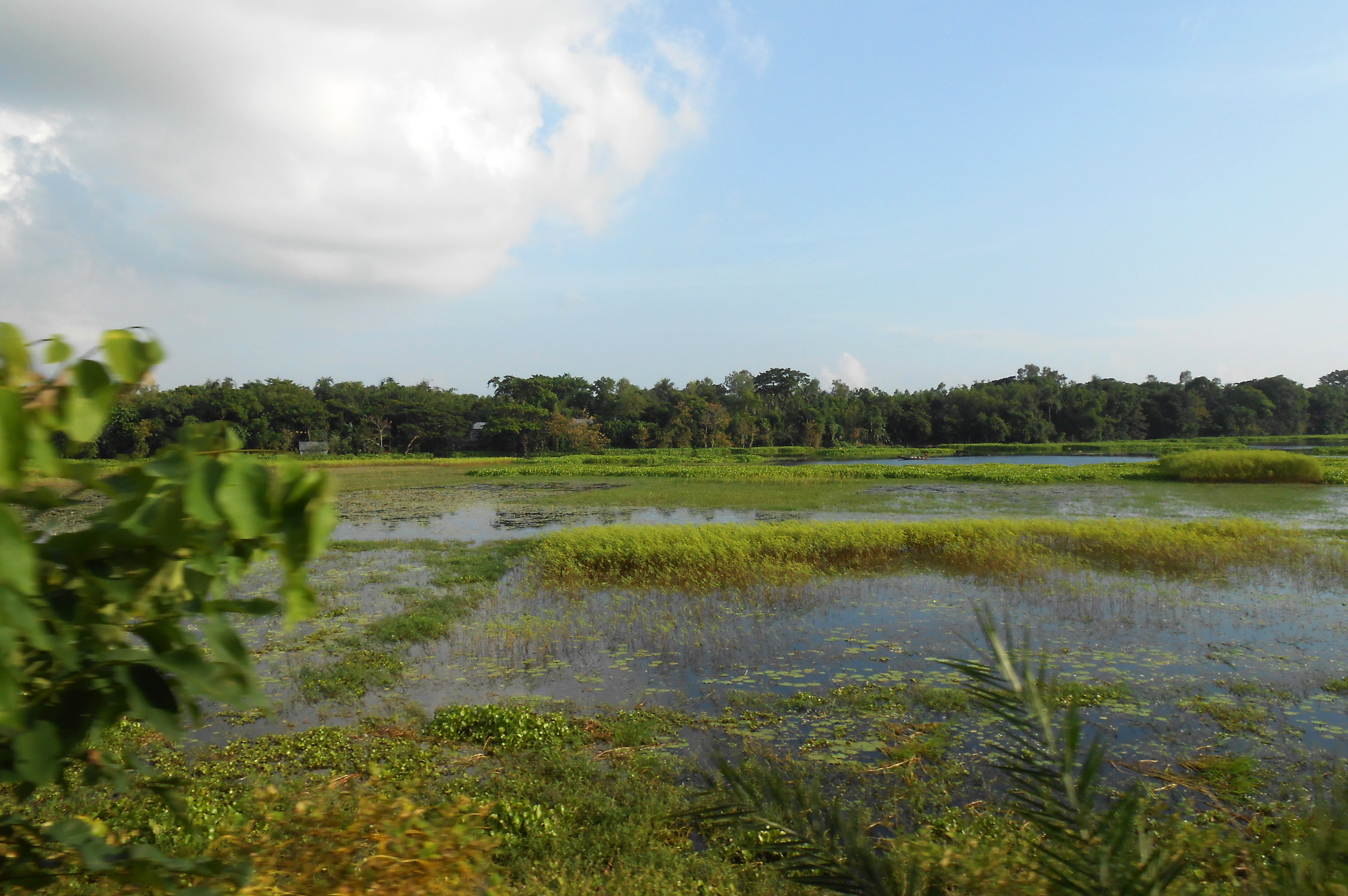

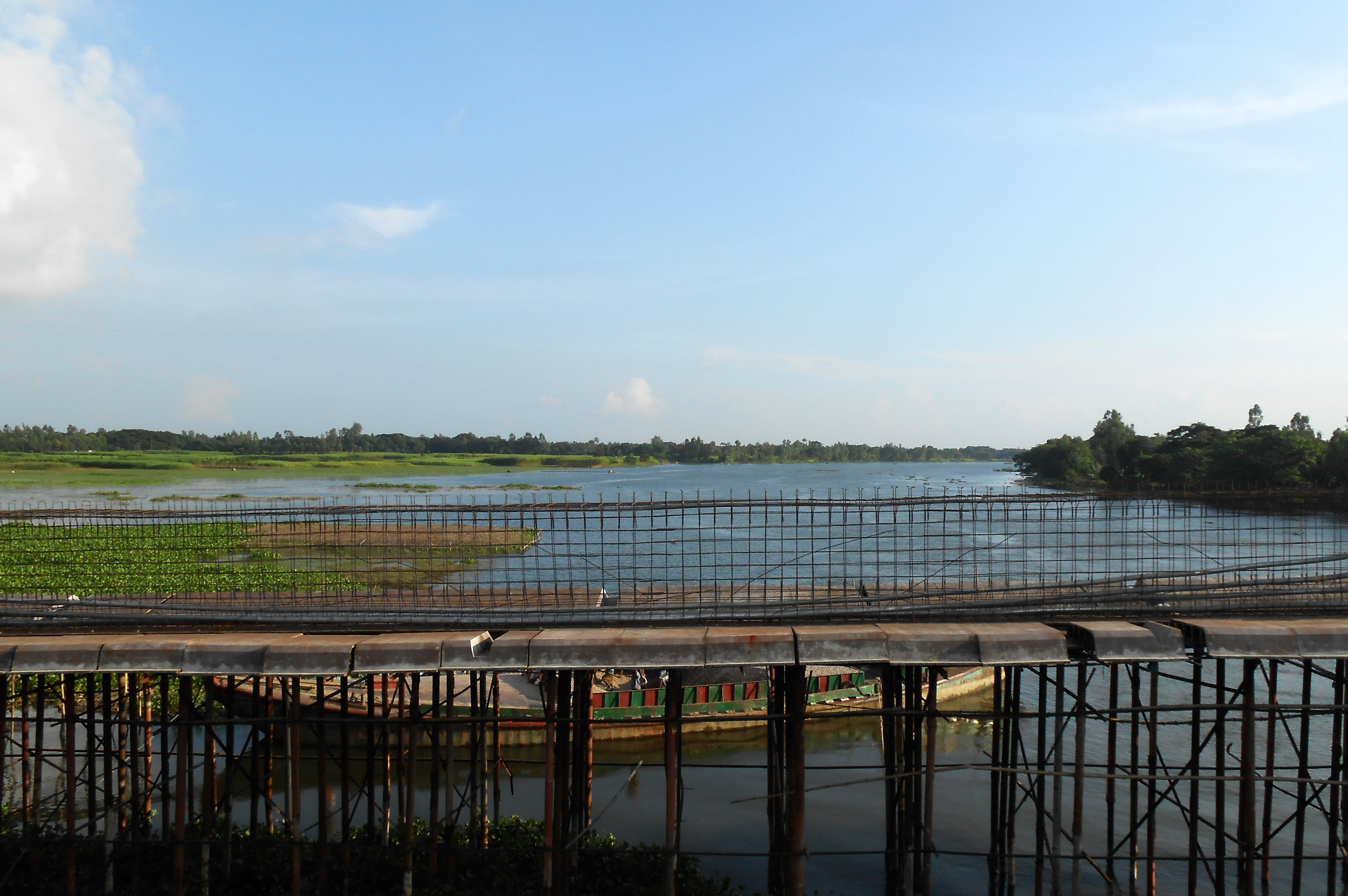

== See also ==
- Districts of Bangladesh
- Upazilas of Bangladesh
- Divisions of Bangladesh
- Upazila
- Thana
- Administrative geography of Bangladesh
