= Nurul Majid Mahmud Humayun =

Bangladeshi politician (1950–2025)

- নূরুল মজিদ মাহমুদ হুমায়ূন
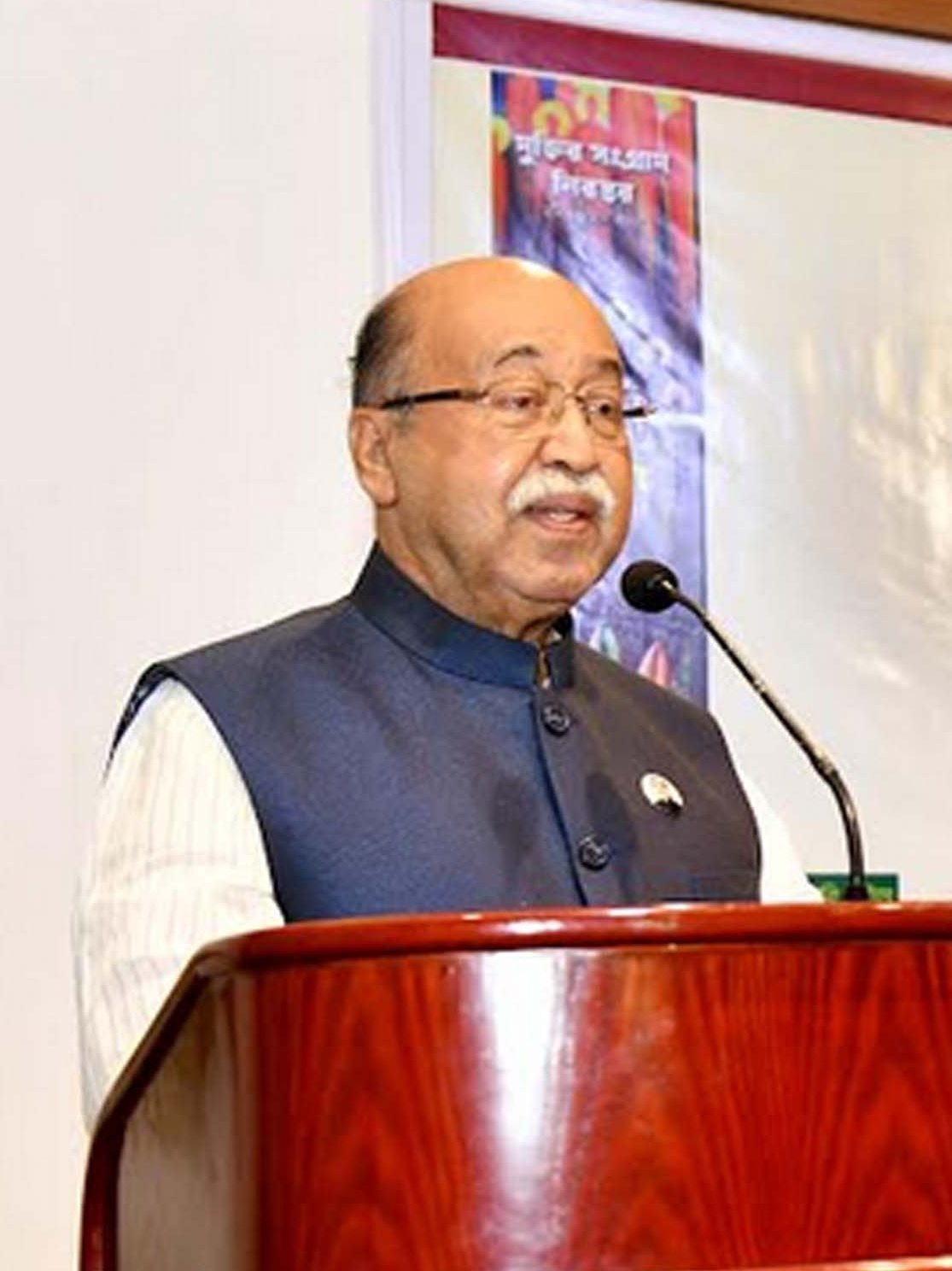
- Humayun in 2024

Minister of Industries
- In office 7 January 2019 – 6 August 2024
- Preceded by: Amir Hossain Amu
- Succeeded by: Adilur Rahman Khan (as Adviser)

Member of the Bangladesh Parliament for Narsingdi-4
- In office 25 January 2009 – 6 August 2024
- Preceded by: Sardar Shakhawat Hossain
- Succeeded by: Sardar Shakhawat Hossain
- In office 10 July 1986 – 6 December 1987
- Preceded by: Position created
- Succeeded by: Mohammad Shahidullah Bhuiyan

Personal details
- Born: 18 November 1950 Dhaka, East Bengal, Dominion of Pakistan
- Died: 29 September 2025 (aged 74) Dhaka, Bangladesh
- Party: Bangladesh Awami League
- Spouse(s): Shahida Akhter & Nadira Mahmud
- Parent: Mohammad Abdul Majid (father)
- Education: University of Dhaka

Nurul Majid Mahmud Humayun (18 November 1950 – 29 September 2025) was a Bangladeshi politician served as the Minister of Industries during 2019–2024 and a five-term Jatiya Sangsad member representing the Narsingdi-4 constituency which encompasses Belabo and Manohardi upazilas. He was a member of Bangladesh Awami League.

== Early life and education ==
Nurul Majid Mahmud Humayun was born on 16 December 1950 in Dacca, East Bengal (now Bangladesh). His father, Mohammad Abdul Majid, was an honorary magistrate and the president of the Bengal Union Board. The family's origins lie in the Baganbari of Gotashia in Monohardi, Narsingdi. His mother was Noor Begum.

Humayun completed his secondary education at the St. Gregory's High School in 1967, and then studied at Dacca College. He graduated from the University of Dacca with an MSS in political science and an LLB.

== Career ==
Humayun was elected to parliament from Narsingdi-4 in 2008 and 2014 as a candidate of the Bangladesh Awami League. He was the chairperson of both the Parliamentary Standing Committee on Ministry of Commerce (Bangladesh) and of Ministry of Expatriates Welfare and Overseas Employment. In January 2019, he was appointed the Minister of Industries.

Humayun lost his ministerial and Jatiya Sangsad membership positions after the fall of the Sheikh Hasina led government in August 2024. Subsequently, he was arrested by a team of the Rapid Action Battalion on 25 September 2024 and sent to jail by a Narsingdi court; he was charged of a murder Jahangir Alam, a Sramik Dal leader, in Narsingdi on 4 August during the quota reform movement.

On 8 April 2025, the Anti-Corruption Commission (ACC) filed two separate cases against Humayun and his wife, Nadira Mahmud, over allegations of illegally acquiring wealth amounting to BDT 9.28 crore.

== Death ==
On 28 September 2025, while in jail custody, Humayun had uncontrolled bowel and bladder complications. He was then admitted to Dhaka Medical College Hospital and shifted to the ICU. He died the next day, confirmed by his son, Manzurul Majid Mahmud Sadi, in a Facebook post. Following his death, an image circulated on social media purporting to show him lying in bed in handcuffs, with posts claiming it was taken on his deathbed. Jail authorities rejected this claim and told that the image was taken on 27 September, long before he was taken to ICU.
