= Bhaterchar =

Coordinates: 24.088°N 90.822°E

Bhaterchar is a village in Belabo Upazila, Narsingdi District, Bangladesh.

Covering an area of approximately 3 square km, it has a population of approximately 3,100.
