= Narsingdi-4 =

Constituency of Bangladesh's Jatiya Sangsad

Coordinates: 24.15°N 90.70°E

- Constituency for the Jatiya Sangsad
- District: Narsingdi District
- Division: Dhaka Division
- Electorate: 341,742 (2018)

Current constituency
- Created: 1984
- Party: Bangladesh Nationalist Party
- Member: Sardar Md. Sakhawat Husain
- ← 201 Narsingdi-3 203 Narsingdi-5 →

Narsingdi-4 is a constituency represented in the Jatiya Sangsad (National Parliament) of Bangladesh since 2026 by Sardar Md. Sakhawat Husain of the Bangladesh Nationalist Party.

== Boundaries ==
The constituency encompasses Belabo and Manohardi upazilas.

== History ==
The constituency was created in 1984 from the Dhaka-24 constituency when the former Dhaka District was split into six districts: Manikganj, Munshiganj, Dhaka, Gazipur, Narsingdi, and Narayanganj.

== Members of Parliament ==
Election	Member	Party
1986	Nurul Majid Mahmud Humayun	Independent
1988	Mohammad Shahidullah Bhuiyan	Jatiya Party
1988 by-election	AHM Abdul Halim	Jatiya Party
1991	Sardar Md. Sakhawat Husain	Bangladesh Nationalist Party
Feb 1996	Sardar Md. Sakhawat Husain	Bangladesh Nationalist Party
Jun 1996	Nuruddin Khan	Awami League
2001	Sardar Md. Sakhawat Husain	Bangladesh Nationalist Party
2008	Nurul Majid Mahmud Humayun	Awami League
2014	Nurul Majid Mahmud Humayun	Awami League
2018	Nurul Majid Mahmud Humayun	Awami League
2024	Nurul Majid Mahmud Humayun	Awami League
2026	Sardar Md. Sakhawat Husain	Bangladesh Nationalist Party

== Elections ==
=== Elections in the 2020s ===
General election 2026: Narsingdi-4
Party	Candidate	Votes	%	±%
BNP	Sardar Md. Sakhawat Husain	161,912		
Jamaat	Md. Jahangir Alam	76,445		
IAB	Md. Saifullah			
Majority		85,467		
Turnout				
Registered electors		428,954		
BNP gain from AL				

=== Elections in the 2010s ===
Nurul Majid Mahmud Humayun was re-elected unopposed in the 2014 general election after opposition parties withdrew their candidacies in a boycott of the election.

=== Elections in the 2000s ===
General Election 2008: Narsingdi-4
Party	Candidate	Votes	%	±%
AL	Nurul Majid Mahmud Humayun	145,989	62.0	+17.0
BNP	Mohammad Zainul Abedin	78,789	33.5	−16.4
BDB	Md. Sanaul Huq	5,141	2.2	N/A
IAB	Kazi Ashraf Ali	2,773	1.2	N/A
Zaker Party	Md. Waiz Uddin Akonda	1,521	0.6	N/A
CPB	Kazi Sazzad Zahir	604	0.3	−0.1
Gano Forum	Md. Ashraf Ali	356	0.2	N/A
BKA	Md. Shamsuzzaman	191	0.1	N/A
Majority		67,200	28.6	+23.7
Turnout		235,364	88.6	+8.3
AL gain from BNP				

General Election 2001: Narsingdi-4
Party	Candidate	Votes	%	±%
BNP	Sardar Shakhawat Hossain Bokul	102,714	49.9	+4.0
AL	Nuruddin Khan	92,564	45.0	−1.5
Independent	Khairul Majid Mahmud Chandan	8,870	4.3	N/A
IJOF	Md. Delowar Hossain Khokan	1,148	0.6	N/A
CPB	Kazi Sazzad Zahir	397	0.2	N/A
Majority		10,150	4.9	+4.2
Turnout		205,693	80.3	−2.6
BNP gain from AL				

=== Elections in the 1990s ===
General Election June 1996: Narsingdi-4
Party	Candidate	Votes	%	±%
AL	Nuruddin Khan	78,723	46.5	−11.1
BNP	Sardar Shakhawat Hossain Bokul	77,620	45.9	−7.5
JP(E)	A. Rauf	6,454	3.8	+2.6
Jamaat	A. T. M. Rafiuddin	3,395	2.0	−3.8
IOJ	Md. Jamal Uddin	1,840	1.1	N/A
WPB	Shamsuzzaman Milon	545	0.3	−1.0
Zaker Party	Md. Akram Hossain	535	0.3	−1.1
Independent	Md. A. Baten	131	0.1	N/A
Majority		1,103	0.7	−17.3
Turnout		169,243	82.9	+24.6
AL gain from BNP				

General Election 1991: Narsingdi-4
Party	Candidate	Votes	%	±%
BNP	Sardar Shakhawat Hossain Bokul	71,350	53.4	
AL	Nurul Majid Mahmud Humayun	47,309	35.4	
Jamaat	A. T. M. Rafiuddin	7,726	5.8	
Zaker Party	A. T. M. Abdullah Al Hossain	1,922	1.4	
WPB	Shamsuzzaman Bhuiyan	1,742	1.3	
JP(E)	Nargis Begum	1,608	1.2	
Jatiya Oikkya Front	A. Rashid	531	0.4	
CPB	Md. Matiur Rahman	525	0.4	
Independent	Ashrab Ali	436	0.3	
Bangladesh National Congress	Mofazzal Master	241	0.2	
Jatiya Samajtantrik Dal-JSD	Md. Abul Hasnat	216	0.2	
Majority		24,041	18.0	
Turnout		133,606	58.3	
BNP gain from				
