= Muhammad Habibullah Pathan =

Bangladeshi archaeologist

- মুহাম্মদ হাবিবুল্লা পাঠান
- Pathan in 2019
- Born: 7 February 1939; Belabo, Bengal Province, British India
- Died: 21 March 2026 (aged 87); Belabo, Narsingdi District, Bangladesh
- Father: Muhammad Hanif Pathan

Muhammad Habibullah Pathan (7 February 1939 – 21 March 2026) was a Bangladeshi archaeologist, folklore collector and Bangla Academy Literary Award-winning author.

== Background ==
Muhammad Habibullah Pathan was born on 7 February 1939 in Bateswar village of Narsingdi in the then Bengal Province, British India. His father Muhammad Hanif Pathan was a school teacher, a folklore collector and researcher. Just like his father, Habibullah became interested in archaeology and folklore research and got involved in Wari-Bateshwar ruins archaeological research in 1955. They jointly established the Bateshwar Archaeological Museum and Library, where rare books, historical periodicals and ancient artifacts are preserved.

== Career ==
After the death of his father, Pathan continued the research on Wari-Bateshwar ruins.

Pathan wrote 16 books, among which research on folklore, archaeology and regional history among which Wari-Bateshwar: In Search of Roots (2013) is the most notable.

Pathan became a fellow of the Bangla Academy and won the 2020 Bangla Academy Literary Award in the folklore category.

Pathan died in Bateshwar village on 21 March 2026 at the age of 87.
