= Wari-Bateshwar ruins =

Archaeological site in Bangladesh

Wari-Bateshwar
- উয়ারী-বটেশ্বর (Bengali)
- Location within Dhaka division Location within Bangladesh Location within South Asia
- 24°05′35″N 90°49′32″E
- Type: Settlement
- Cultures: Northern Black Polished Ware
- Location: Wari-Bateshwar, Narsingdi District, Dhaka Division, Bangladesh

The Wari-Bateshwar (Bengali: উয়ারী-বটেশ্বর, Bengali pronunciation: [u̯aɾi bɔʈeʃʃɔɾ]) ruins in Narsingdi, Dhaka Division, Bangladesh is one of the oldest urban archaeological sites in Bangladesh. Excavation in the site unearthed a fortified urban center, paved roads and suburban dwelling. The site was primarily occupied during the Iron Age, from 400 to 100 BCE, as evidenced by the abundance of punch-marked coins and Northern Black Polished Ware (NBPW) artifacts.

The site also reveals signs of pit dwelling, a feature typically found in Chalcolithic archaeological sites in the Indian sub-continent.

== Geography ==
The site sprawls across Wari and Bateshwar, two adjacent villages in the Belabo Upazila of Narsingdi district, about 17 km north-west of the confluence of the rivers Old Brahmaputra and Meghna at the lower end of Sylhet basin. Borehole records show that the site lies on the remnants of a Pleistocene fluvial terrace about 15 metre above sea level and 6-8 metre above the current river level. The sediment consists of brownish red clay with interbedded sand layers, locally knows as Madhupur clay.

The main stem of the Brahmaputra River shifted back and forth between the Brahmaputra-Jamuna and the Old Brahmaputra branches through history. Around 2500 BCE, avulsion of the main channel to the Brahmaputra-Jamuna branch gave rise to discontinuous peatlands throughout Sylhet basin. The evidence of early urban settlement on the peatlands at Wari-Bateshwar was found in stratigraphic layers dated ~1100 BCE. Human occupation continued for nearly a millennium until ~200 BCE, when the channel shifted back to the Old Brahmaputra branch. The resultant flooding possibly led to the abandonment of the Wari-Bateshwar urban center around 100 BCE. Eventually the 1762 Arakan earthquake again caused the main channel to shift to the Brahmaputra-Jamuna branch.

== Discovery ==
Locals from Wari-Bateshwar have long been aware of the availability of archeological artifacts, especially silver punch-marked coins and semi-precious gemstone beads in the area. In the 1930s, Hanif Pathan, a local school teacher, started collecting these artifacts, and later inspired his son Habibullah Pathan (1939-2026) to continue the exploration. The father-son duo created a local museum called Bateshwar Sangrahashala to store and exhibit their collection. Habibullah Pathan published a number of newspaper articles and books describing the artifacts. Nevertheless, the site took a while to attract the attention of academics and archaeologists in Bangladesh.

=== Excavation ===
In December of 1933, while laborers were digging the soil in the village of Wari, they discovered a hoard of coins stored in a pot. Local schoolteacher Hanif Pathan collected 20–30 of those coins. These were the oldest silver coins of Bengal-India. Thus began the collection of archaeological artifacts from Wari-Bateshwar.

In 1955, local laborers left behind two pieces of iron in the village of Bateshwar. These triangular and one-pointed, heavy iron objects were shown by Habibullah Pathan to his father, who was amazed. On January 30 of that year, Hanif Pathan published an article titled "Prehistoric Civilization in East Pakistan" in the Sunday edition of the daily Azad newspaper. After that, various archaeological artifacts continued to be discovered in that area from time to time.

In March of 1956, a farmer from Wari village named Jaru Mia discovered a hoard of stamped silver coins while digging soil. That hoard contained at least about four thousand coins and weighed nine ser. Failing to understand the historical value of the coins, Jaru Mia sold them to a silversmith at the rate of eighty taka per ser. For just 720 taka, these invaluable historical items were melted down in the silversmith’s furnace and lost forever.

During 1974–1975, Habibullah Pathan was an honorary collector for the Dhaka Museum. At that time, he donated a significant number of stamped coins, stone beads, iron axes, and spears to the museum for research purposes. He also donated 30 iron axes obtained from the village of Raingartek. Around 1988, Shahabuddin from the village of Wari unearthed a collection of 33 bronze vessels from underground. Later, he sold them to a scrap dealer for only 200 taka.

At one point, Habibullah Pathan began offering small amounts of money to local children and teenagers in exchange for gathering ancient artifacts. Through this effort, he began collecting various previously undiscovered archaeological items from the Wari-Bateshwar area. Due to his dedicated efforts, it became possible to recover rare individual artifacts of Bengal-India even before formal excavation began. These included: Vishnupatta, a bronze galloping horse, tin-rich handled vessels, a Shiva naivedya (offering) bowl, fragments of a relic casket, stone weights, a Neolithic stone chisel, iron axes and spears, stone seals, figures of Triratna, turtles, elephants, lions, ducks, insects, flowers, crescent moons, stars, amulets, terracotta kinnaras, images of the sun and various animals, ring stones, bronze Garuda figures, and several thousand beads made of semi-precious stones and glass.

According to Dr. Sufi Mostafizur Rahman, a faculty member of the Department of Archaeology at Jahangirnagar University, Wari-Bateshwar was a prosperous, well-planned, ancient market or trade center. "Sounagora" is what the Greek geographer Ptolemy mentioned in his book Geographia. In the year 2000, under the leadership of archaeologist Sufi Mostafizur Rahman, a team began excavation activities at Wari-Bateshwar. The excavation revealed a fortified citadel or royal fort with a dimension of 600 meters × 600 meters, surrounded by a 30-meter-wide moat. On the west and southwest sides of the fort, an additional 5.8-kilometer-long, 5-meter-wide, and 2–5-meter-high earthen wall was found, which is locally known as "Asam Raja’s Fort." In the following two decades, excavations were carried out at various times, through which 48 archaeological sites were identified around the fort. Among the structures of these satellite settlements are brick-built residences and a 160-meter-long road paved with lime-surki and pottery shards.

In 2004, on the eastern side of the urban center, a pit-dwelling with dimensions of 2.60 meters × 2.20 meters × 0.52 meters was discovered. This structure includes a pit, a stove, a granary with a circumference of 272 centimeters and a depth of 74 centimeters, and a stepped reservoir. The floor of this structure is made of red earth and coated with grey clay, although the floor of the granary is constructed of lime-surki. It resembles the Chalcolithic pit-dwellings (1500–1000 BCE) with lime-surki floors excavated in Inamgaon, South India.

Artifacts discovered from Wari-Bateshwar include semi-precious stone beads, glass beads, a vast number of stamped coins, iron axes and knives, copper bangles, copper daggers, dome-shaped vessels made of high-tin bronze and pottery, black and red ware pottery, Northern Indian black slipped ware, and black polished ware. On January 9, 2010, when the ninth phase of excavation began, for the first time, the Ministry of Cultural Affairs of the Government of Bangladesh stepped forward to provide financial sponsorship.

== Discovered antiquities ==
Excavations at Wari-Bateshwar have uncovered a fortified city, port, roads, side roads, terracotta plaques, semi-precious stone and glass beads, coin hoards, and the oldest stamped silver coins of the subcontinent, dating back approximately two and a half thousand years. Experts in architecture have already begun research on a structure shaped like an inverted pyramid. Some believe that four stone artifacts found here belong to the prehistoric Stone Age. Based on the discovery of Neolithic tools, it is assumed that these may have been in use around the middle of the second millennium BCE. The dating of a large number of iron axes and spearheads has yet to be determined. However, based on chemical analysis by Dr. Jahan, these are believed to date from 700–400 BCE. The stamped silver coins are thought to have been in circulation during the Mauryan period (320 BCE–187 BCE). The glass beads were likely in use from the fourth century BCE to the first century CE.

In the year 2000, two Carbon-14 tests were conducted on Northern Black Polished Ware, Rouletted Ware, and NBP (Northern Black Polished) pottery unearthed during archaeological excavations at Wari, organized by the International Centre for Study of Bengal Art. The tests confirmed that the settlement at Wari dates back to 450 BCE.

In Wari village, there exists a square fortification and moat stretching 633 meters. Apart from the eastern moat, traces of the fort and moat are nearly extinct. Another outer fortification and moat, about six kilometers long, starts from Sonarutala village and extends across Bateshwar, Haniabaid, Razarbagh, and Amlab villages, reaching the edge of the Arial Khan River. Locals refer to it as the "Fort of the Uneven King." Such double-layered defensive walls indicate an important commercial or administrative center, which is also a key indicator of urbanization.

In March–April of 2004, excavations by Jahangirnagar University unearthed an ancient paved road in Wari village, 18 meters long, 6 meters wide, and 30 centimeters thick. The road was built using brick fragments, lime, shards of Northern Black Polished Ware, along with tiny, iron-rich pieces of laterite soil. Dr. Sufi Mostafizur Rahman, head of the Archaeology Department at Jahangirnagar University, claimed it to be 2,500 years old. According to Professor Dilip Kumar Chakrabarti of the Archaeology Department at the University of Cambridge, no road of such length and width has ever been discovered in the entire Gangetic valley from the period of the second urbanization. The term "second urbanization" in the Gangetic valley refers to the urbanization phase following the Indus Valley Civilization. Therefore, it is claimed that the road discovered here is not only the oldest in Bangladesh, but also the oldest in the Indian subcontinent after the Indus Valley Civilization.

Wari-Bateshwar is located on a highland of flood-prone reddish soil on the southern bank of a dry riverbed named Koyra, not far from the confluence of the Old Brahmaputra and Arial Khan rivers. Considering its geographical position, this archaeological site is more clearly identified as a center of external trade during the Early Historic period. Based on Ptolemy's accounts, Dilip Kumar Chakrabarti assumes that in the Early Historic era, Wari-Bateshwar functioned as a trading warehouse (entry port) for the collection and distribution of goods from Southeast Asia and the Roman Empire. Sufi Mostafizur Rahman has strongly sought to establish this assumption.

=== Buddhist Lotus Temple ===
In March 2010, during the ninth phase of excavation, a nearly 1,400-year-old brick-built Buddhist Lotus Temple was uncovered. The square-shaped Buddhist temple, measuring 10.6 meters by 10.6 meters, has walls 80 centimeters thick and a foundation base of one meter. The foundation of the clay masonry walls is laid in three tiers. On the north, south, and west sides of the main wall, at a distance of 70 centimeters, there are parallel walls, each 70 centimeters thick. Surrounding the main wall is a 70-centimeter-wide circumambulatory path paved with bricks. On the outer side of the circumambulatory path, parallel to the main wall, there is another wall 60 centimeters thick. However, on the eastern side, the distance between the main wall and the outer wall is 3.5 meters. On the eastern side, there is a circumambulatory path and a veranda.

So far, two construction phases of the Buddhist temple have been identified. Although part of the brick-paved floor from the initial construction phase has been exposed, more time will be needed to identify other features. However, in the subsequent construction phase, a brick-paved altar was found in the southeast corner. In the excavation, a lotus with eight petals emerged in a mostly intact state. As the lotus is one of the eight auspicious symbols in Buddhism, its presence bestows the temple with the status and significance of a "Lotus Temple." The temple has been identified from Mandir Bhita in Shibpur Upazila.

== History ==
No inscription or written record was found in this site. Although stratigraphic evidence points to earlier urban settlement, radiometric dating of the artifacts places the peak active period of the Wari-Bateshwar urban center in the mid-1st millennium BC. The discovery of rouletted and knobbed ware, and stone beads of eclectic nature implies southeast Asiatic and Roman contacts through river routes. It is postulated by Sufi Mostafizur Rahman, the leader of the first excavation team, that Wari-Bateshwar is the ancient emporium or trading post "Sounagora" mentioned by Ptolemy in Geographia.

Two types of punch-marked coins were found in the site—Pre-Mauryan Janapada series regional coins (600-400 BCE) and Mauryan imperial series coins (500-200 BCE). The regional coins bear a set of four symbols on one side and either a blank or a minute symbol on the reverse side. Symbols include boat, lobster, fish in hook or scorpion, cross leaf etc. that are uncommon in contemporary coins found in the other regions of India. It is postulated that these coins were used as local currency in the Vanga Kingdom and are distinct from the coins used in Anga, found in Chandraketugarh in West Bengal, India.

Wari-Bateshwar yielded a very large variety of semi-precious stone bids, which is unprecedented in Indian archaeology of the period. Bead materials include various kinds of quartz—Rock Crystal, Citrine, Amethyst, Agate, Carnelian, Chalcedony, and green or red Jasper. Stratigraphic analysis shows that the layers containing signs of the vibrant bead culture were abruptly interrupted by sedimentary layers dating around 200 BCE, which implies possible displacement of the Wari-Bateshwar people (and loss of bead culture) by a course change of the Old Brahmaputra River.

=== Ptolemy’s Sounagora ===
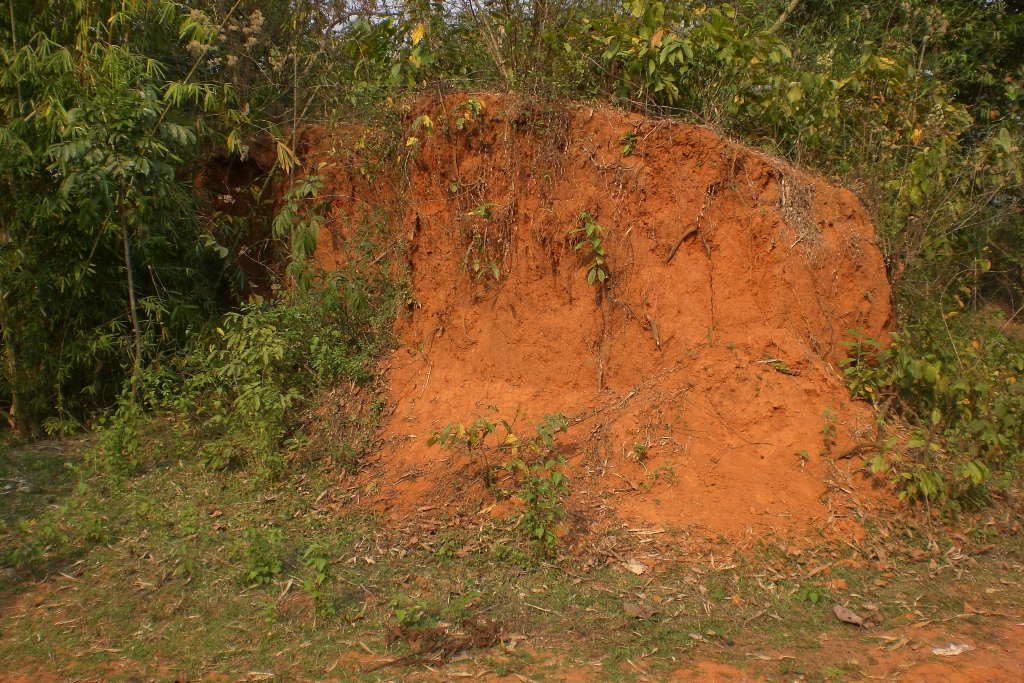
A part of the wall of the fort city

Where exactly the "Sounagora" mentioned by the Greek geographer Ptolemy was located has been a question of interest among various archaeological researchers, many of whom point to this region of Bangladesh. The ancient Subarnagram is presently known as Sonargaon. This place is a char land (land rising from riverine silt deposits)—a famous medieval capital and river port. Therefore, it is assumed that the expanse of Sounagora–Subarnagram–Sonargaon stretched across a wide region populated by rivers such as Laksha, Brahmaputra, Arial Khan, and Meghna, encompassing areas like Savar, Kapasia, Barshi, Sreepur, Tok, Belabo, Marjal, Palash, Shibpur, Monohardi, and Wari-Bateshwar. Based on the discovery of colorful glass beads and sandwich glass beads at Wari-Bateshwar and evidence of external trade with various regions of India, Southeast Asia (Thailand), and the Mediterranean (Roman Empire), many archaeologists have identified Wari-Bateshwar as the "Sounagora" referred to by Ptolemy.

From the village of Sonarutala, two dedicatory mounds—one stone and one terracotta—have been discovered. From their construction techniques and the technology of firing, it is inferred that these were used during the Chalcolithic period. In Pandu Raja’s mound in West Bengal, communities of the Chalcolithic era (1600 BCE–1400 BCE) built pottery in gray, reddish, and black colors stamped with impressions of rice husks. The tradition of mixing paddy or rice husks with clay to make bricks and pottery has been a longstanding cultural hallmark of this region.

According to information gathered from Alexander and his army, Diodorus (69 BCE–16 CE), while writing about the lands beyond the Indus, noted that the region across the Ganges was under the dominance of the Gangaridai. It was mentioned that in the 4th century BCE, the king of the Gangaridai was immensely powerful. His army consisted of 6,000 infantry, 1,000 cavalry, and 700 war elephants. The data suggests that even faraway western countries remained aware of their name and fame for the following 500 years.

== Culture ==
Despite the lack of inscription or written records, symbols on the discovered artifacts shed light on the cultural elements of the Wari-Bateshwar society. The punch-marked coins bear the solar and six-armed symbols, mountain with three arches surmounted by a crescent, Nandipada or taurine symbol and various animal motifs and geometric figures. On the other hand, Nandipada and Swastika symbols are found on stone querns. These symbols indicate the presence of "Hinduism" in the Wari-Bateshwar society.

Archaeobotanical study of carbonized seed and seed fragments reveals the predominance of rice agriculture. The subspecies cultivated was japonica rather than Indica, the more dominant cultivar in contemporary South India. Other crops included barley, oat, a small numbers of summer millets, a wide variety of summer and winter pulses, cotton, sesame and mustard. The abundance of cotton seed fragments indicate an important role of textile production in the Wari-Bateshwar economy.

== Collection, preservation, and exhibition ==
No arrangements have been made to exhibit the various archaeological artifacts recovered from the excavation of Wari-Bateshwar in any museum. Some artifacts are under the custody of the Department of Archaeology of Bangladesh, and some are under the custody of the Heritage Exploration and Research Center. However, Hanif Pathan, on his own initiative, established a family museum named Bateshwar Antiquities Collection and Library in his residence. It is currently overseen by his son, Md. Habibullah Pathan. It houses a three-thousand-year-old iron axe, artifacts from the Neolithic Age dating back four to five thousand years, bronze bangles from the Chalcolithic Age dating back three to four thousand years, terracotta spheres used in warfare, beads made of stones of various colors, stamped silver coins from the pre-Christian era, historical journals compiled over time, mementos, and a collection of several thousand rare books.

== Wari-Bateshwar Fort City Open-Air Museum ==
At the initiative of the archaeological research center Heritage Exploration, the Wari-Bateshwar Fort City Open-Air Museum was inaugurated on February 24, 2018, in the Wari archaeological village. At the inauguration, the Executive Director of Heritage Exploration, Dr. Sufi Mustafizur Rahman, stated that this type of archaeological museum is the first of its kind in Bangladesh. In this Wari-Bateshwar Fort City Open-Air Museum, models of artifacts, replicas, original artifacts, photographs of artifacts, descriptions, and analyses are on display.

== Gallery ==
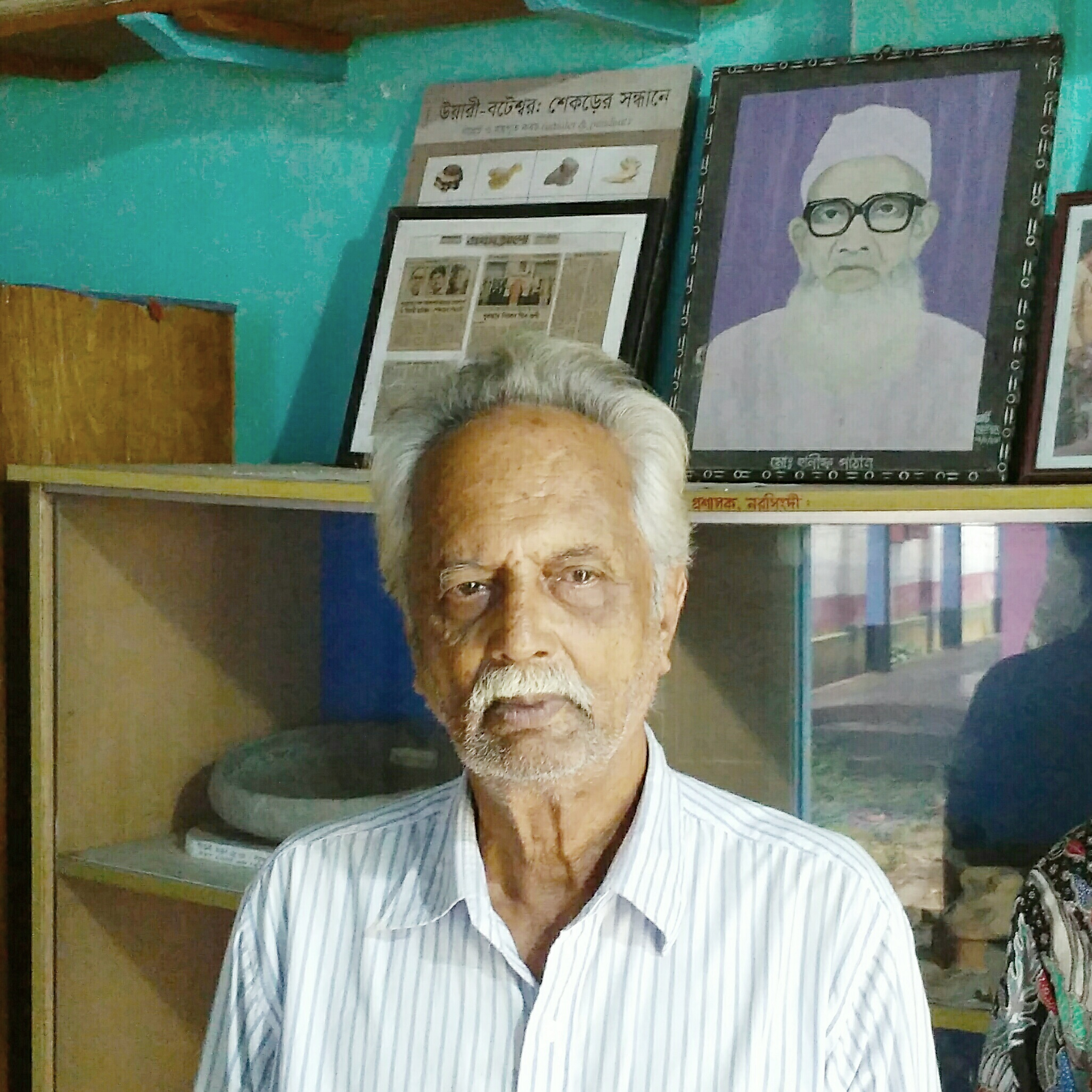
Habibulla Pathan, at his personal archaeological museum and library at Bateshwar, Narsingdi.

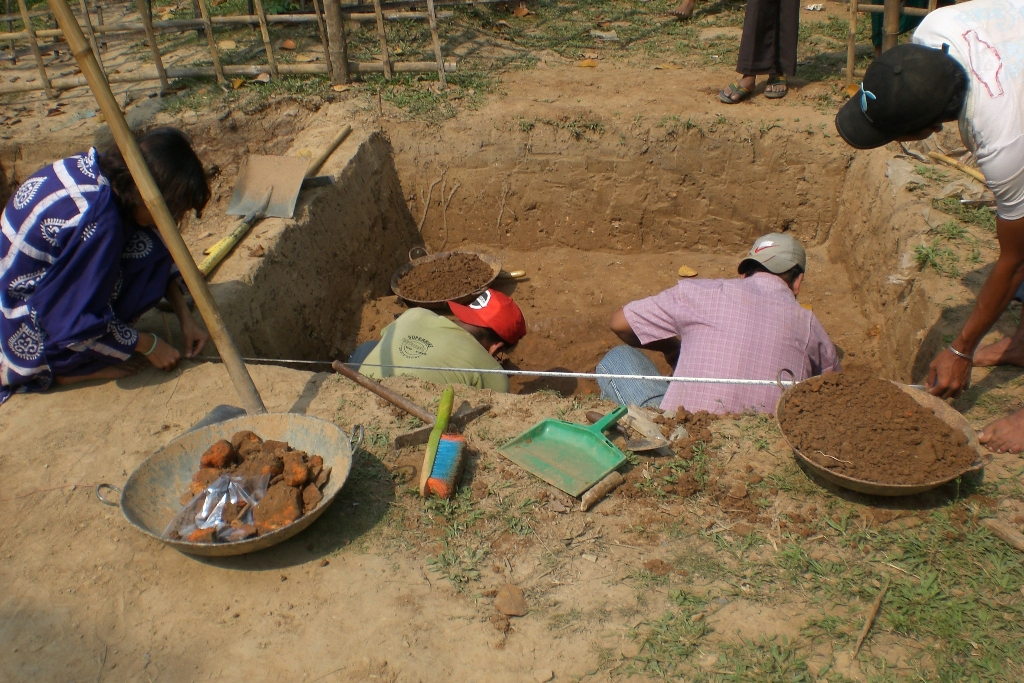
Taking measurement for a new dig.

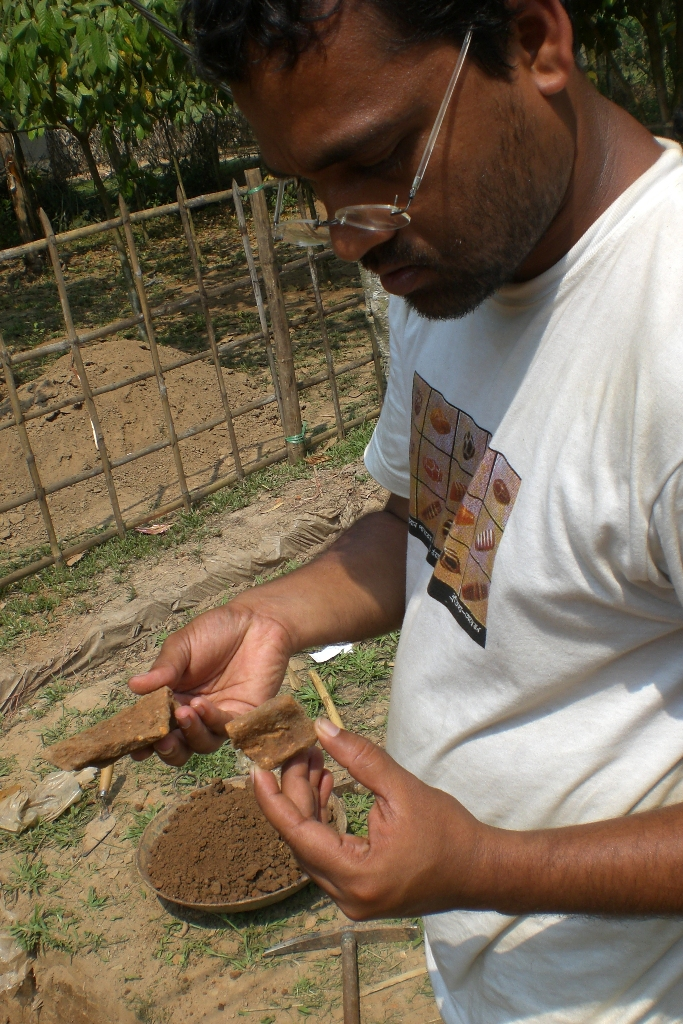
A student of the Archaeology department has just got an artefact (pottery).

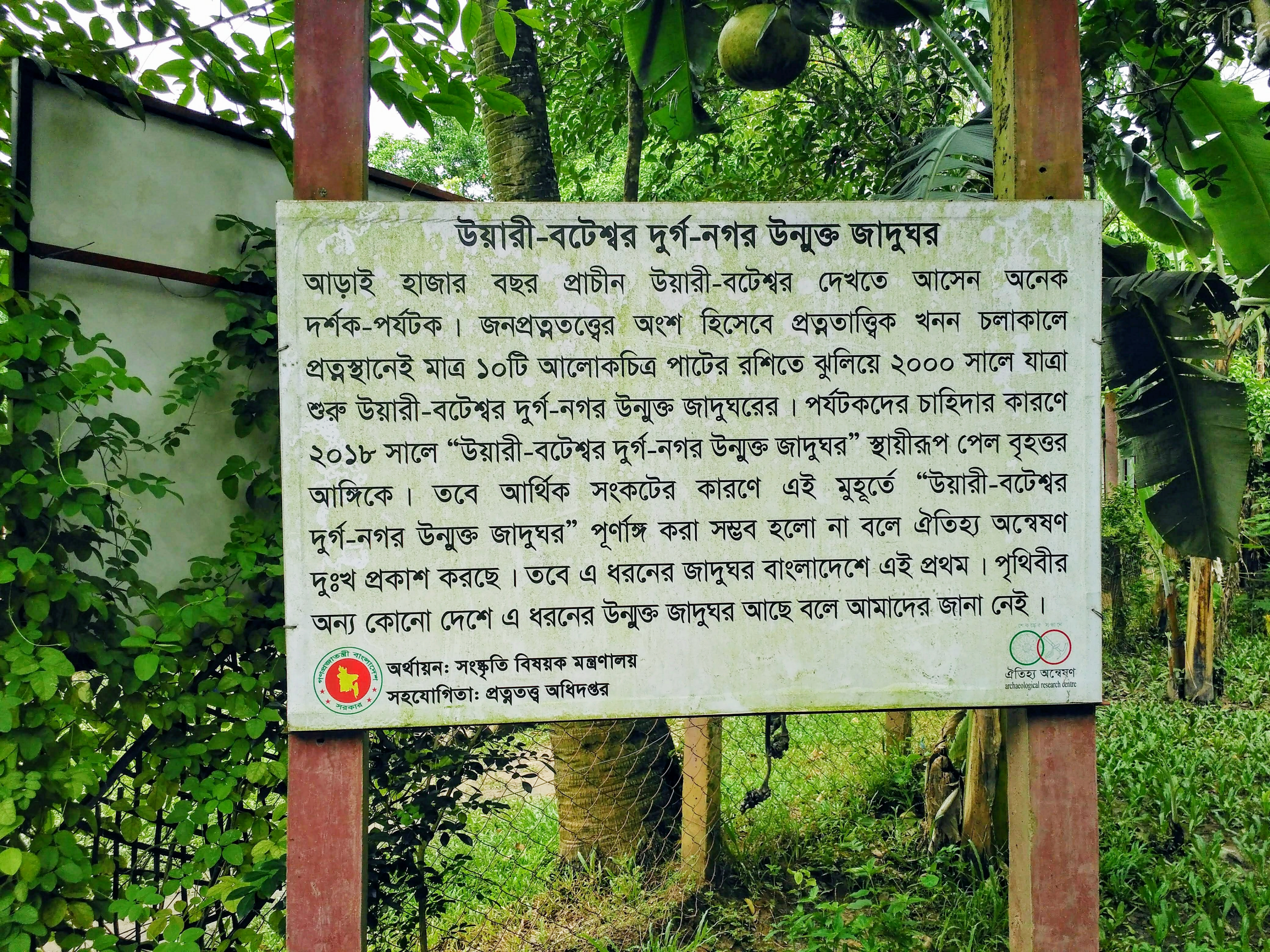
Signboard of "Wari-Bateshwar Fort-City Open air Museum", Narsingdi (August 2019)

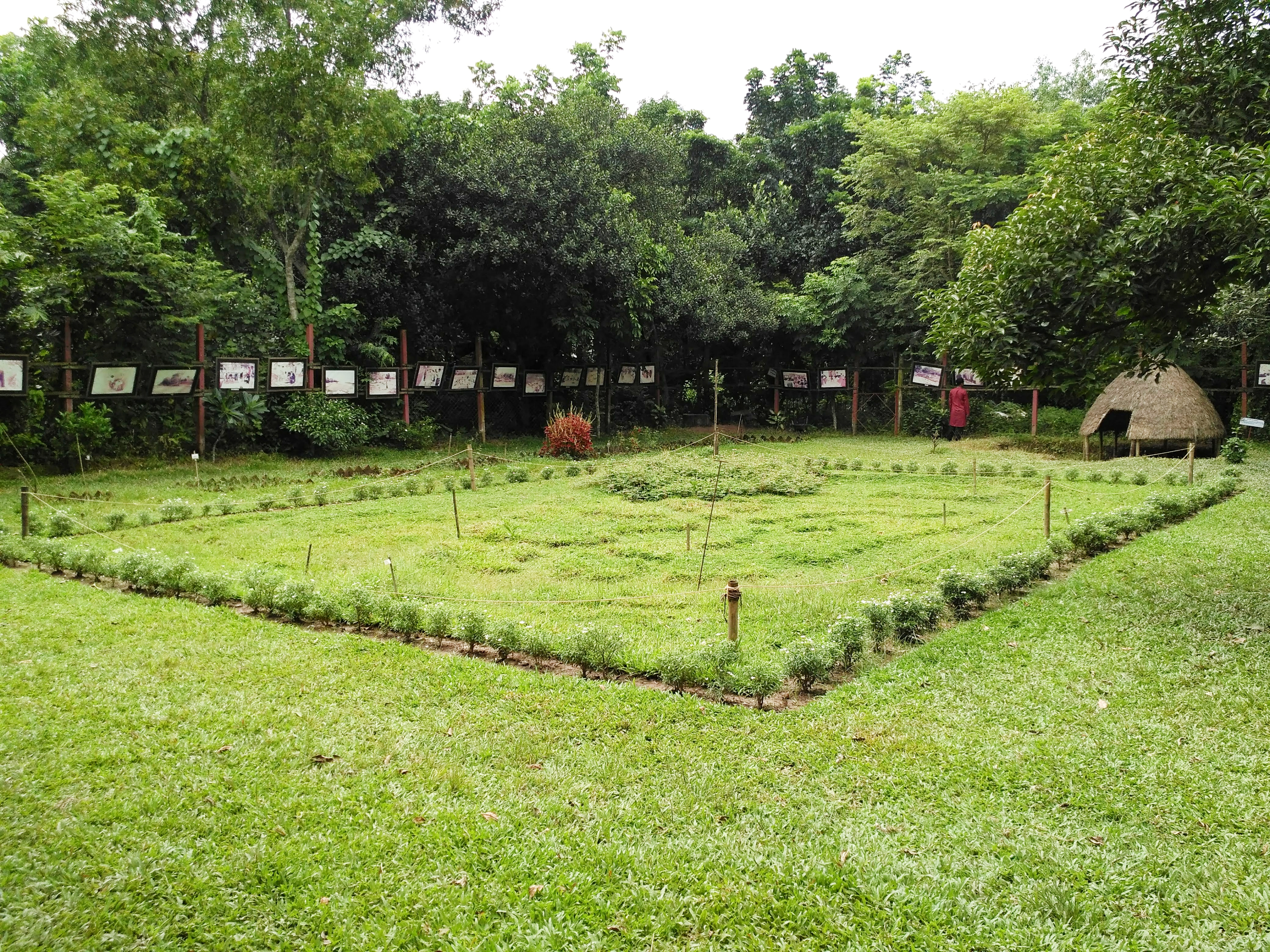
Photo of "Wari-Bateshwar Fort-City Open air Museum", Narsingdi (August 2019)

== See also ==
- Timeline of Bangladeshi history
- List of archaeological sites in Bangladesh
- Gangaridai
- Chandraketugarh
