= Nuruddin Khan =

6th Army Chief of Bangladesh and former Awami League politician

Minister of Power, Energy and Mineral Resources
- In office 23 June 1996 – 29 March 1998
- Prime Minister: Sheikh Hasina
- Preceded by: Jamilur Reza Choudhury
- Succeeded by: Rafiqul Islam

6th Chief of Army Staff
- In office 31 August 1990 – 30 August 1994
- President: Hussain Muhammad Ershad; Shahabuddin Ahmed (acting); Abdur Rahman Biswas
- Prime Minister: Kazi Zafar Ahmed; Khaleda Zia
- Preceded by: Atiqur Rahman
- Succeeded by: Abu Saleh Mohammad Nasim

Personal details
- Born: 31 August 1940 (age 86) Monohardi, Bengal, British India
- Party: Independent
- Other political affiliations: Bangladesh Awami League (1996 - 2014)

Military service
- Allegiance: Pakistan (before 1972); Bangladesh
- Branch: Pakistan Army; Bangladesh Army
- Service years: 1959 – 1994
- Rank: Lieutenant General; Service number: BA –118
- Unit: Corps of Engineers
- Commands: Chief of Army Staff; Chief of General Staff; GOC of 9th Infantry Division; GOC of 33rd Infantry Division; Commandant of Engineer Centre and School of Military Engineering
- Battles/wars: Indo-Pakistani War of 1965; Gulf War

Nuruddin Khan is a retired three-star general of the Bangladesh Army who served as chief of army staff from June 1990 to August 1994. Khan was also the minister of energy, power and mineral resources under the first Hasina ministry in 1996.

== Early life and education ==
Khan was born on 31 August 1940 to a Bengali family of Muslim Khans in the village of Katabaria in Monohardi, then in the Bengal Province of British India (now in Dhaka Division, Bangladesh).

Khan graduated from Gurudayal Government College in Kishoreganj and later finished his Bachelor of Engineering from the Ansanullah Engineering College in 1957. He also enlisted in the Pakistan Military Academy through the Inter Services Selection Board the same year. Khan was commissioned with the 20th PMA long course in the Pakistan Army Corps of Engineers on 17 October 1959. Khan completed his staff college course in 1970 from the Command and Staff College in Quetta, Pakistan.

== Military career ==
=== Pakistan ===
Khan commanded two engineers brigade company as captain and served as general staff officer (coordination) to the then general officer commanding of the 1st Armoured Division, Major General Yaqub Khan, in 1965. He was promoted to major in January 1970 and soon posted in an engineers construction battalion near Chilas. During the Bangladesh Liberation War, one of his officers, Captain Mohiuddin Jahangir, defected to join the Mukti Bahini in 1971. Khan was soon transferred to Peshawar and was detained by the Pakistan Army. He was repatriated to the Bangladesh Army in April 1972.

=== Bangladesh ===
Khan was designated as deputy adjutant and quartermaster of the 14th Independent Engineers Brigade in 1972. He was promoted to lieutenant colonel in December 1973 and served as the director of the engineer division of Dacca Municipality. Khan was upgraded to colonel in August 1974 and served as deputy commandant of the Engineer Centre and School and School of Military Engineering. Khan transferred to army headquarters in May 1975.

During the assassination of Sheikh Mujib, Khan was serving as director of military operations at army headquarters. Khan was then promoted to brigadier general in July 1976 and retain his position before returning to the Engineer Centre and School and School of Military Engineering as commandant in October 1976. He was soon then promoted to major general in February 1978 and became one of the pioneer commanders of the 33rd Infantry Division. Khan was also general officer commanding of the 9th Infantry Division in June 1978. In December 1980, Khan succeeded Major General Muhammed Abul Manzur as the chief of the general staff. In May 1981, Manzur assassinated President Ziaur Rahman, and Khan was instrumental in putting down Manzur's coup attempt. He informed General Hussain Muhammad Ershad, then chief of the army, and instructed him to apprehend Manzur. Brigadier General Mohsin Uddin Ahmed and Brigadier General Hannan Shah, two of Manzur's generals, were captured who tried to escalate a negotiation. However, Khan refused and demanded an unconditional surrender. Manzur later directly contacted Khan, and, although it was assumed to be futile, it made Manzur lose hope and convinced him to flee.

==== As chief of army staff ====
In November 1990, then President Hossain Mohammad Ershad promoted Khan to the rank of lieutenant general and appointed him as the Chief of Army Staff of the Bangladesh Army. In spite of his pinnacle military stance, he remained a ceremonial figure during the first four months of his office, as most of the military instructions were executed directly by Ershad himself. In November 1990, Khan voiced support for pro-democracy protests that eventually forced Ershad to resign as the military refused Ershad's pleas for help and instead supported the transition to democracy. Khan oversaw national security during the 1991 Bangladeshi general election. Khan went on leave per retirement in August 1994 and was succeeded by Lieutenant General Abu Saleh Mohammad Nasim as the chief of army staff.

== Political career ==
Khan soon joined the Bangladesh Awami League in 1996 and was elected to parliament from Narsingdi-4 in the June 1996 Bangladeshi general election. Sheikh Hasina appointed him minister of energy and mineral resources. His party colleagues criticized him harshly after the country experienced severe power shortages and fuel prices rose sharply. Because of their dissatisfaction with his management of the situation, he was demoted to the housing ministry in May 1998. During the July Uprising, Khan spoke at a press conference of former army officers jointly calling for the armed forces to refrain from attacking the protesters. He stated:

The damage, suffering, and bloodshed caused by firing on students is heartbreaking. I was reassured by the statement made by General Waker-Uz-Zaman yesterday (August 3). I hope he will stick to that decision. No more blood should be spilled in this country.

This is the second time that he has voiced support for pro-democracy protests, having previously supported the movement against Ershad.

In December 2019, Khan expanded and renovated the Khan Bari Jame Masjid in Katabaria, Monohardi, in collaboration with his nephew, Engineer Enamul Haque Khan.

== Personal life ==
Khan is married and has two daughters and a son. His son briefly served in the Bangladesh Army. Khan and his wife reside in the Mohakhali DOHS of the capital, Dhaka.

== Awards and decorations ==

| | Nirapattya Padak (Nirapattya Padak) | | |
| Plaban 1988 Padak (Plaban 1988 Padak) | Joy Padak (Joy Padak) | Songbidhan Padak (Songbidhan Padak) | Jesthata Padak III (Jesthata Padak III) |
| Jesthata Padak II (Jesthata Padak II) | Jesthata Padak I (Jesthata Padak I) | Sitara-e-Harb 1965 War (War Star 1965) | Tamgha-e-Jang 1965 War (War Medal 1965) |
