= Sardar Md. Sakhawat Husain =

Bangladeshi politician

- সরদার মোঃ শাখাওয়াত হোসেন
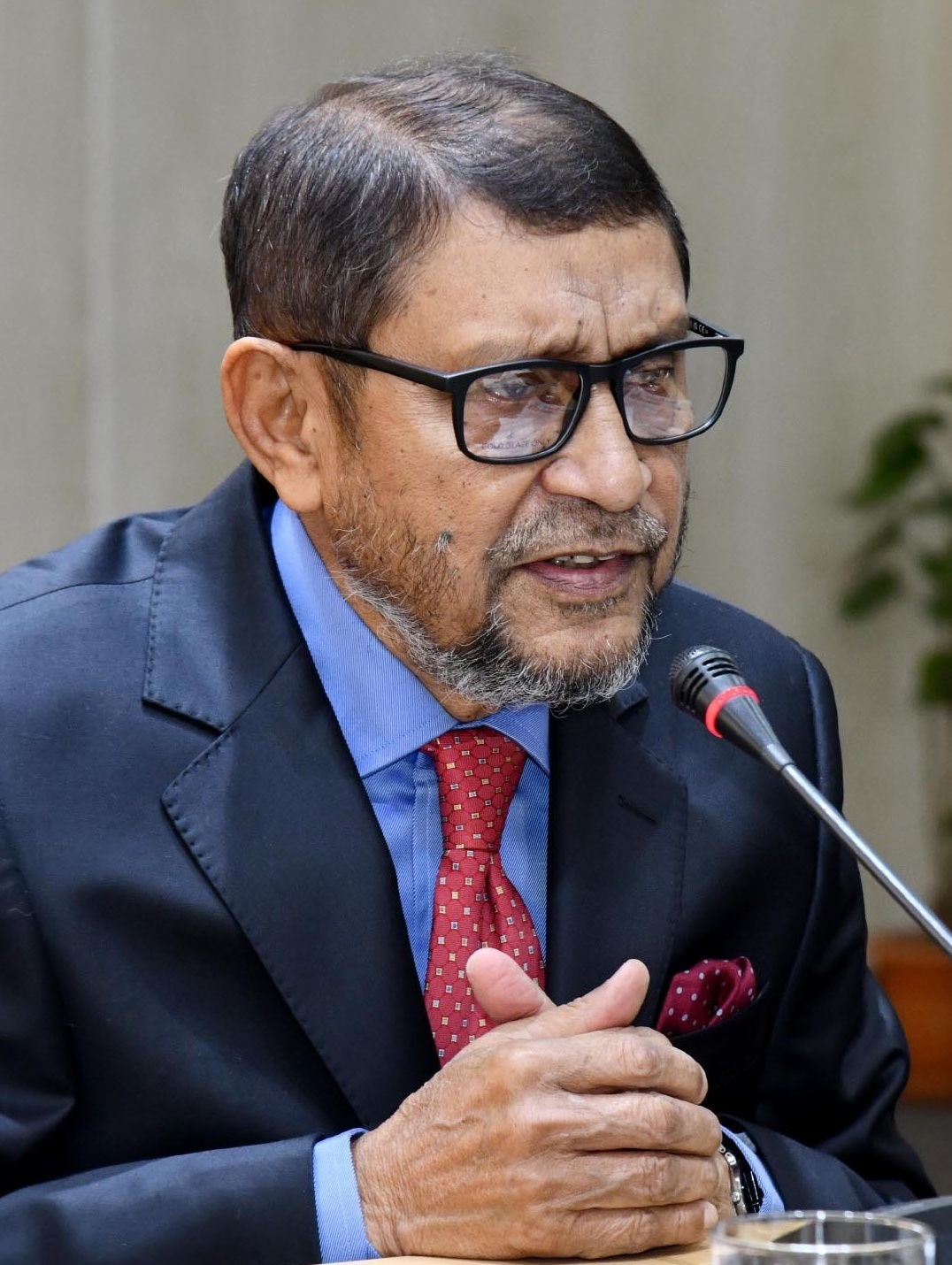
- Sardar Husain in 2026

Minister of Health and Family Welfare
- Incumbent
- Assumed office 17 February 2026
- Prime Minister: Tarique Rahman
- Preceded by: Nurjahan Begum

Member of the Bangladesh Parliament for Narsingdi-4
- Incumbent
- Assumed office 17 February 2026
- Preceded by: Nurul Majid Mahmud Humayun
- In office 10 October 2001 – 29 October 2006
- Preceded by: Nuruddin Khan
- Succeeded by: Nurul Majid Mahmud Humayun
- In office 20 March 1991 – 30 March 1996
- Preceded by: AHM Abdul Halim
- Succeeded by: Nuruddin Khan

Personal details
- Born: 30 August 1951 (age 75) Narsingdi District, East Pakistan
- Party: Bangladesh Nationalist Party
- Nickname: Bokul

Sardar Md. Sakhawat Husain Bokul (Bengali: সরদার মোঃ শাখাওয়াত হোসেন বকুল; born 30 August 1951) is a Bangladesh Nationalist Party politician and the incumbent Jatiya Sangsad member representing the Narsingdi-4 constituency and the incumbent minister of health and family welfare.

== Career ==
Bokul was elected to parliament from Narsingdi-4 as a Bangladesh Nationalist Party candidate in 1991 and 2001.

On 26 December 2013, he was arrested from the residence of Khaleda Zia, former prime minister and chairperson of the Bangladesh Nationalist Party. He was admitted to Dhaka Medical College Hospital following his arrest. On 4 June 2017, Bokul was sued by a businessman for extortion.

== Criticism ==
Soon after Bokul assumed office as minister of health and family welfare, Bangladesh experienced a major outbreak of measles that resulted in multiple child deaths. Public health experts criticised the Health Ministry, attributing the crisis to declining immunisation coverage, vaccine shortages, and disruptions in routine vaccination programmes. However, BNP health affairs editor attributed the situation to the failures of the preceding Yunus administration and to shortcomings during the tenure of health adviser Nurjahan Begum.
