= Hanif Pathan =

Bangladeshi folklorist and antiquarian

- মুহম্মদ হানিফ পাঠান
- Born: 6 April 1901; Raipura, Narsingdi, Dacca district, Bengal Presidency
- Died: 1989 (aged 87–88)
- Occupations: Folklorist and antiquarian
- Children: Muhammad Habibullah Pathan

Muhammad Hanif Pathan (6 April 1901 - 1989) was a Bangladeshi folklorist and antiquarian. He is best known for publicizing the Wari-Bateshwar ruins, an ancient fort city and archaeological site of Bangladesh dating back to 450 BC. He is credited as the highest number of proverbs collector in Bangladesh.

== Early life ==
Pathan was born on 6 April 1901 (23 Choitro 1307) ‍in the village of Deewanchar in Narsingdi, Dacca district, Bengal Presidency (now Bangladesh) to his maternal house. He belongs to a Bengali Muslim Pathan family from Bateshwar in Belabo. He passed the Normal Examination (professional training institute for the teachers) from Dhaka Normal School in 1921. He then began his career as a school teacher and was involved in the teaching profession until his death.

== Books ==
- Bangla Prabad-Parichiti (two-volume compilation of proverbs)
- Pallisahityer Kudana Manik (1937)
