= Rashiduddin Ahmad =

Bangladeshi neurosurgeon

- রশিদ উদ্দিন আহমদ
- Born: 27 August 1937; Cox's Bazar, Bengal Presidency, British India
- Died: 19 March 2016 (aged 78); Bangladesh Medical University, Dhaka, Bangladesh
- Resting place: Belabo, Narsingdi District
- Occupation: Neurosurgeon
- Known for: being the first Bangladeshi neurosurgeon

Rashiduddin Ahmad (27 August 1937 – 19 March 2016) was a Bangladeshi neurosurgeon. He received Independence Day Award in 1999 from the government of Bangladesh. He was a sportsperson in his early days and was the recipient of 2007 Bangladesh National Sports Award in the basketball category.

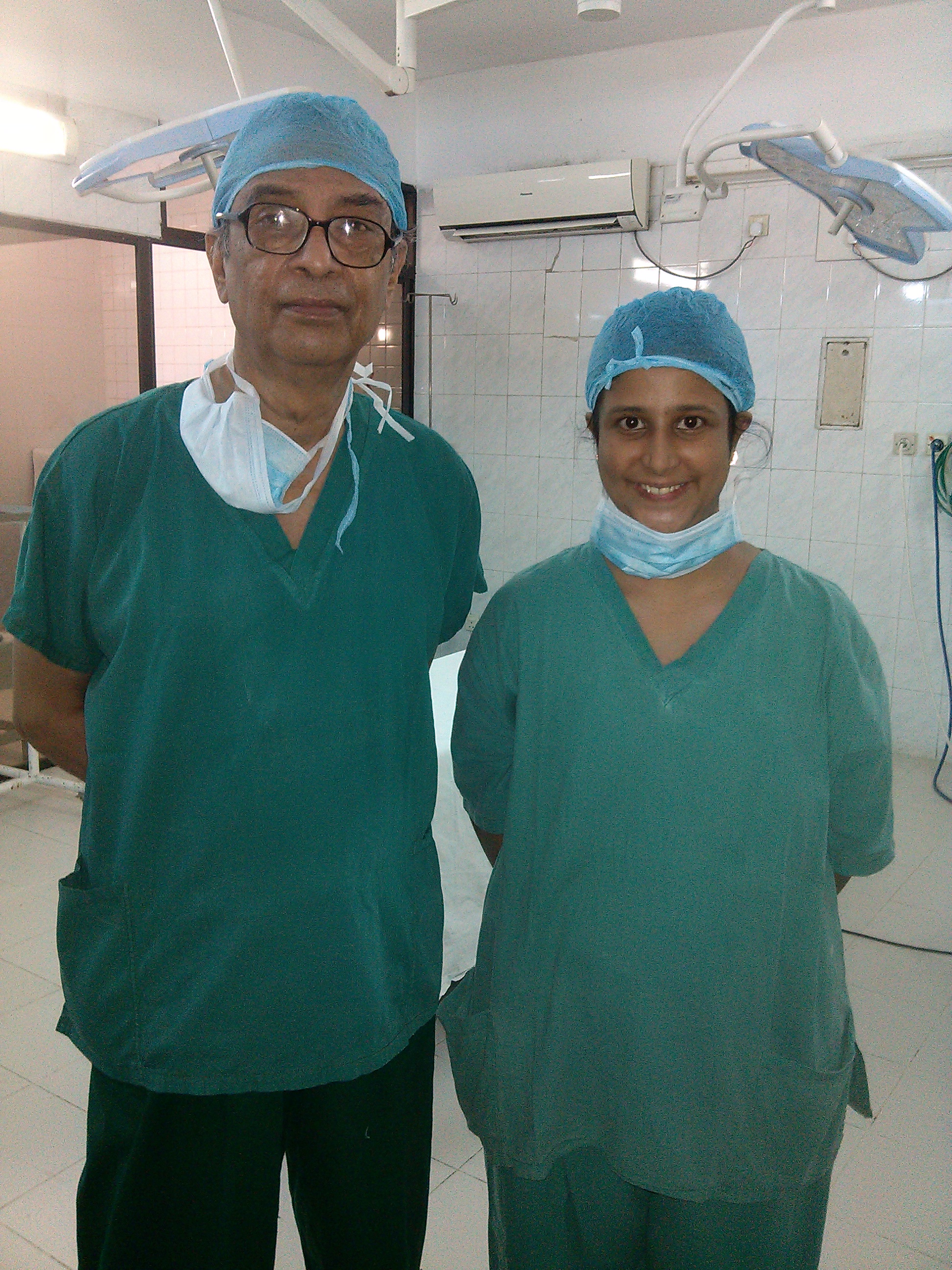
Ahmad and Andishae Haasan after OT in 2015

== Education ==
Ahmad was born in 1937 in Cox's Bazar. His father was a magistrate in the then Bengal Civil Service. The family moved to Dhaka in 1946. Ahmad studied in St. Gregory's High School and College and Notre Dame College. He was then admitted to Dhaka Medical College in the then East Pakistan in 1955. He earned his MBBS in 1960, and following his surgical residency under Professor Asiruddin, went to Scotland in 1963 to pursue surgical specialty at the Department of Surgical Neurology of University of Edinburgh, under neurosurgeon Francis Gillingham.

== Career ==
Ahmad returned to Dhaka in April 1970 and, first as an assistant surgeon then as an associate professor at the neurosurgical unit of Institute of Postgraduate Medicine and Research (IPGMR). During the 1971 war, he moved to Edinburgh and worked as a senior registrar and then consultant neurosurgeon at a number of hospitals in England and Wales. In 1976, he returned permanently to Dhaka and joined as the professor of neurosurgery at IPGMR in 1979, and later a consultant neurosurgeon at the Combined Military Hospital with the honorary rank of colonel. He was the first chairman of the neurosurgery department when the IPGMR turned into a university, Bangabandhu Sheikh Mujib Medical University, in 1998.

In 1987, he became the founding general secretary (and later president) of the Bangladesh Society of Neurosciences. Then in 1998, he became the founding president of the Bangladesh Society of Neurosurgeons and helped establishing the National Institute of Neuroscience in 2012. He was a founder member of the Asian Congress of Neurological Surgeons (ACNS). He became the second president of the South Asian Association of Neurological Societies, and was an honorary president of the Asian Australasian Society of Neurological Surgeons.

Ahmad was selected as the first captain of the East Pakistan National Basketball team. In 1989, he captained the Bangladesh team for Davis Cup.

== Personal life ==
Ahmad married Quamrun Nahar in 1966, later divorced. Together they had a daughter and a son. Ahmad's brother, Ghiasuddin Ahmad, a professor of history at the University of Dhaka, was a victim of the 1971 killing of Bengali intellectuals.
