= Monohardi Government Model Pilot High School =

Monohardi Govt Pilot Model High School
- মনোহরদি সরকারি পাইলট মডেল হাই স্কুল

Location
- Monohardi Upazila; Narsingdi; Bangladesh; 24°08′42″N 90°41′44″E

Information
- Type: Public
- Motto: Knowledge is energy ★ জ্ঞানই শক্তি
- Established: 1948
- School code: 6622
- Headmaster: Mujtoba Juwel
- Grades: 6–10
- Age range: 11–16
- Language: Bengali
- Website: http://www.monohardimphs.edu.bd/

Monohardi Govt Pilot Model High School (MGPMHS) is a public school located in Monohardi Upazila, Narsingdi, Bangladesh.

== History ==
The school was established in 1948 in then East Pakistan now Bangladesh and follows the Secondary School Certificate (SSC) curriculum in Bengali medium. Now, this is the most reputed high school in Monohardi Upazila.

== Structure ==
The school enrolls students from class (grade) 6 to 10. The school operates in one shift. Every year more than 200 students appear in the SSC and JSC examination, with about two-fourth in science group, and one-fourth in commerce group and the rest in arts group. According to school's official website there are about 1600 students and 44 teachers and stuffs in this school.
