= Mohammad Shahidullah Bhuiyan =

Bangladeshi politician

Member of Bangladesh Parliament
- In office 1988–1990

Mohammad Shahidullah Bhuiyan (Bengali: মোহাম্মদ শহীদুল্লাহ ভূঁইয়া) is a politician and a former member of the Bangladesh Parliament for Narsingdi-4.

== Career ==
Bhuiyan was elected to parliament from Narsingdi-4 as a Combined opposition candidate in 1988.
