= Belabo Upazila =

Belabo বেলাবো
- Upazila
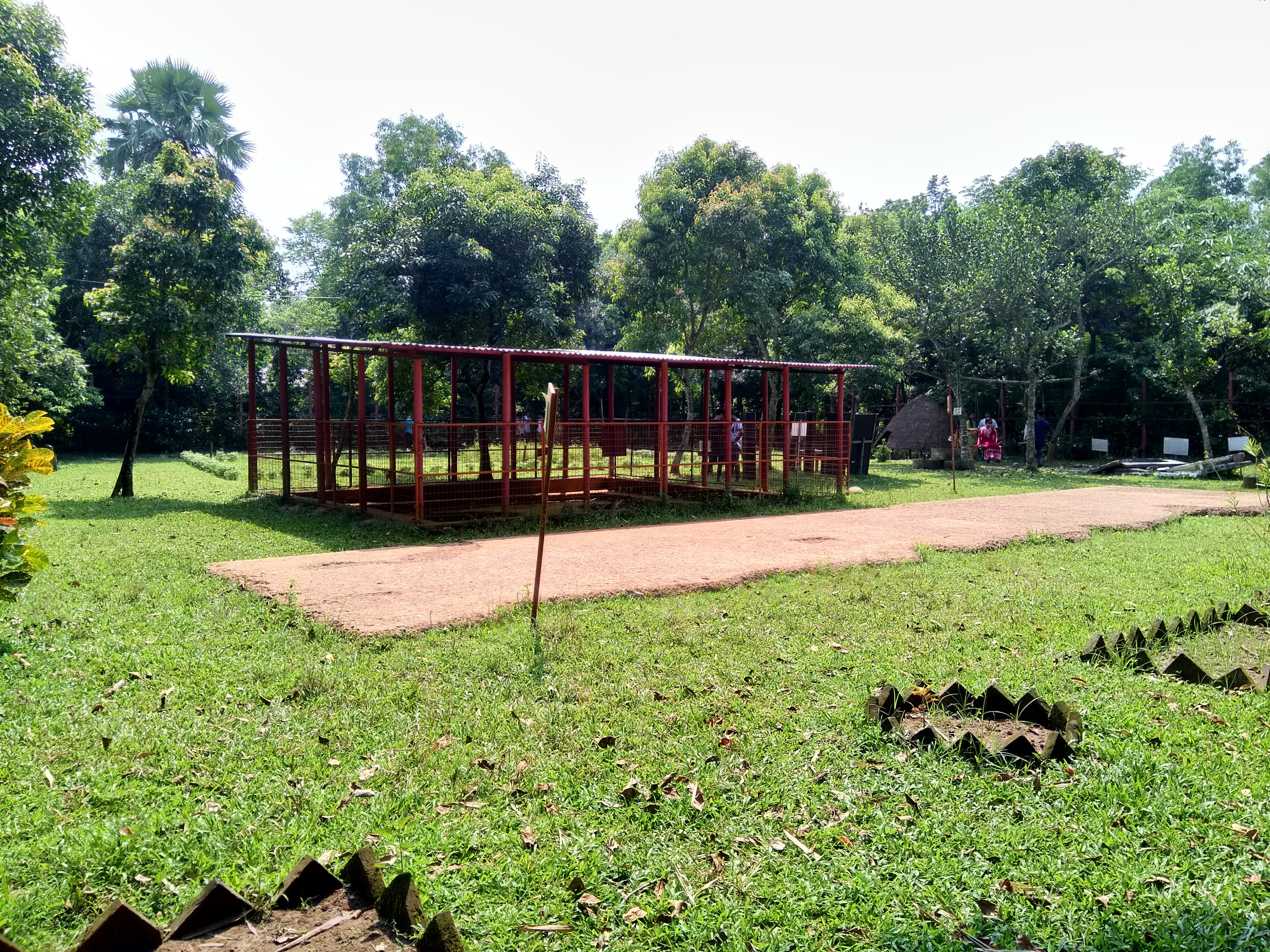
- Wari-Bateshwar ruins

- Coordinates: 24°5.5′N 90°51′E
- Country: Bangladesh
- Division: Dhaka
- District: Narsingdi

Government
  - MP (Narsingdi-4): Sardar Md. Sakhawat Husain

Area
  - Total: 117.90 km^{2} (45.52 sq mi)

Population (2022)
  - Total: 213,602
  - Density: 1,811.7/km^{2} (4,692.3/sq mi)
- Time zone: UTC+6 (BST)
- Postal code: 1640
- Website: belabo.narsingdi.gov.bd

Belabo Upazila mauza geocode map

Belabo (Bengali: বেলাবো) is an upazila of the Narsingdi District of Bangladesh, located in the Dhaka Division. Here the 2,500-year-old civilisation of Wari-Bateshwar has been discovered. It is believed that it was a port city with foreign trade with Ancient Rome, Southeast Asia, and other regions. It is the oldest city so far discovered after the Indus Valley civilisation. Though part of Narsingdi, the Bengali dialect spoken by the people of Belabo is similar to that of Greater Mymensingh.

== Geography ==
Belabo is located at 24.0917°N 90.8500°E and has a total area of 117.66 km^{2}. It is bounded by Katiadi Upazila and Kuliarchar Upazila (in Kishoreganj District) to the north, Raipura Upazila to the south, Bhairab Upazila and Kuliarchar Upazila to the east, and Shibpur Upazila and Monohardi Upazila to the west.

== Etymology ==
The name of Belabo is said to be derived from bel, which is the Bengali word for the Bengal quince fruit, which can be found in abundance in Belabo.

== History ==
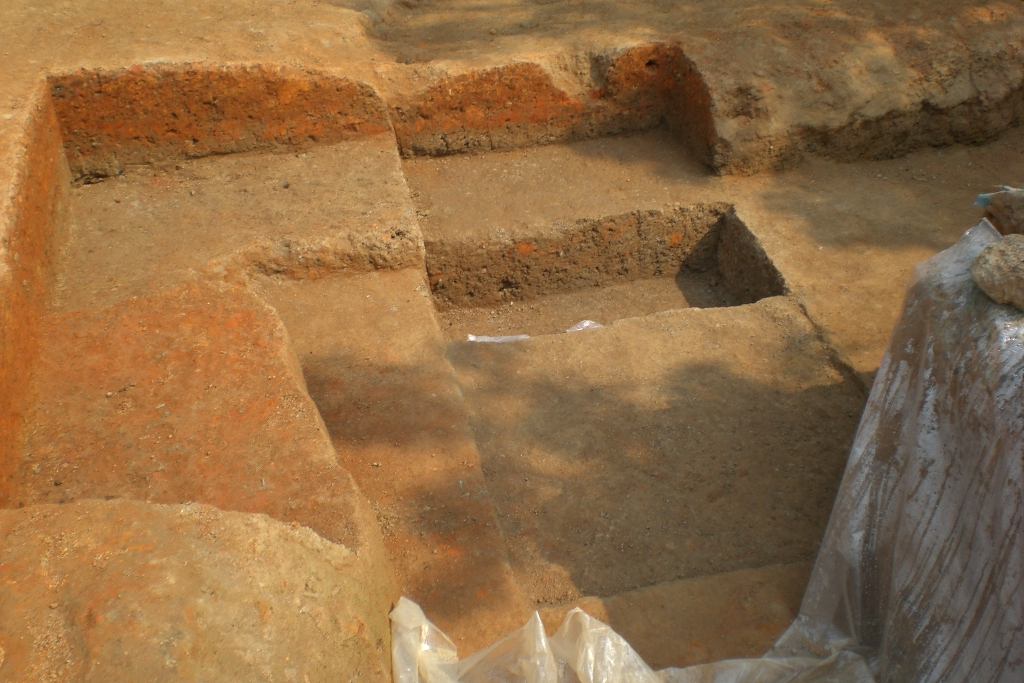
Soil layer covering ancient road system at Bateshwar excavation site.

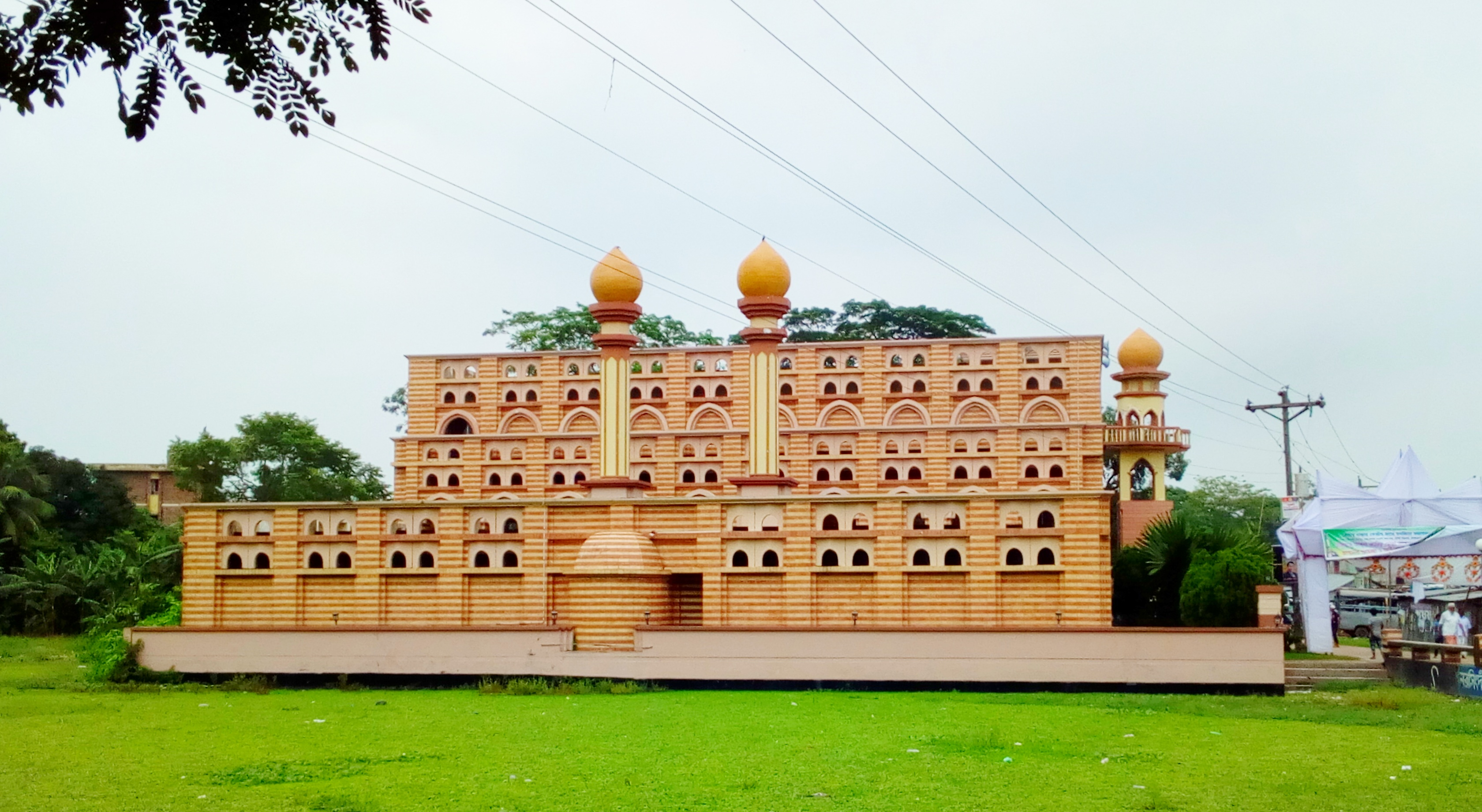
Belabo Bazar Central Mosque dates back 300 years.

Belabo is the site of the ancient Wari-Bateshwar civilisation in Amlab Union, discovered by Hanif Pathan and his son, Habibullah Pathan, in their village in 1933. The artefacts in this fort city suggest that it dates as far back as 2000 BC. The ancient people of Belabo had brick houses, walked on wide roads, and used silver coins and iron weaponry, among many other things. The city also has Asam Rajar Garh (King Asam's Fort). Wari-Bateshwar is thought to be the oldest city in Bengal and the eastern part of the subcontinent.

Belabo later came under the geopolitical division of Samatata before passing on the Khadga dynasty from the 7th century to the 8th century. Following the Conquest of Sylhet in 1303, a 40-year-old Iranian nobleman and preacher migrated to Habashpur in present-day Patuli Union. He is known by locals as Shah Irani, and is credited for ending the oppression of local chief Raja Bijaya Mishra and the kingdom of Asam Raja and for introducing Islam in this area. Irani also helped to cure the sick daughter of the chief of Rampur, Ram Narayan. Celebrating the joyous moment, Narayan dug a large reservoir (Maharanir Dighi), embraced Islam, and gave his daughter's hand in marriage to Irani, though they did not end up having any children. Irani died in the 1350s and was buried in a mazar (mausoleum), where his wife also lies. The mausoleum is an example of Sultanate architecture, and Bengal Sultanate coins have also been discovered in the Wari-Bateshwar ruins.

In the 18th century, Mahbub Ali Bepari of Birbaghab village established the seven-domed Belabo Bazar Central Mosque. The mosque was later renovated and expanded by educationist and Thermax Group chairman Alhaj Abdul Qadir Mullah. The Poradia Muslim High School was founded in 1930.

During the Bangladesh Liberation War of 1971, a battle took place on 14 July in Belabo Sadar, leading to the death of 5 Bengali freedom fighters, including Commander Abul Bashar. Mass killings took place in Kaliakandi in Sallabad Union, with many houses being set on fire.

A grant during the reign of Raja Bhojavarman was discovered in Belabo in the early 20th century. In 1979, the Maharanir Dighi (Maharani's reservoir) was re-excavated, and an eight-cubit big turtle was found among other things. The turtle migrated to a canal in the west of the Shah Irani Waqf estate.

In 1982, 6 unions of Monohardi Thana and 2 unions of Raipura Thana (Narayanpur and Sallabad) were taken to form a new upazila as part of the President of Bangladesh H M Ershad's decentralisation programme. The upazila was named after and headquartered in Belabo, which was previously under Monohardi.

== Demographics ==
Religions in Belabo Upazila (2022)
Religion	Percent
Islam	97.47%
Hinduism	2.53%

According to the 2022 Bangladeshi census, Belabo Upazila had 51,457 households and a population of 213,602. 10.10% of the population were under 5 years of age. Belabo had a literacy rate (age 7 and over) of 73.50%: 74.95% for males and 72.16% for females, and a sex ratio of 93.74 males for every 100 females. 24,907 (11.66%) lived in urban areas.

According to the 2011 Census of Bangladesh, Belabo Upazila had 42,377 households and a population of 190,086. 49,128 (25.85%) were under 10 years of age. Belabo had a literacy rate (age 7 and over) of 48.49%, compared to the national average of 51.8%, and a sex ratio of 1047 females per 1000 males. 99,680 (46.88%) lived in urban areas.

As of the 1991 Bangladesh census, Belabo has a population of 145,708. Males constitute 51.05% of the population, and females 48.95%. This upazila's eighteen-and-up population is 73,046. It has 27,802 households.

== Administration ==
Belabo Upazila is divided into eight union parishads: Amlaba, Bajnaba, Belabo, Binnabayd, Char Uzilab, Naraynpur, Patuli, and Sallabad. The union parishads are subdivided into 51 mauzas and 100 villages.

=== Elected members of parliament ===
List of Members of Parliament
Name	Year
Adv. Mohammad Shahidullah Bhuiyan	1954; 1962; 1979; 1988
Sarder Sakhawat Hossain Bakul	1991; 2001
L. G. Nuruddin Khan	1996
Adv. Nurul Majid Mahmud Humayun	1986; 2008 2014 2018; 2024

=== Upazila chairmen ===
List of chairmen
Name	Notes
Abu Tariq Al-Hussain Bhuiyan	First chairman
Muhammad Shamsher Zaman Bhuiyan Riton Gangkulpari	Present chairman

== Education ==
Belabo has an average literacy rate of 29.9% (7+ years), and the national average of 32.4% literate.

Madrasas in Belabo
Name	Principal
Char Belabo Fazil Madrasa	Muhammad Alim Uddin
Sarrabad Haji Aftab Uddin Dakhil Madrasa	Muhammad Abdul Hakim
Dulalkandi Dakhil Madrasa	Muhammad Dilwar Husayn
BM Poradiya Alim Madrasa	Muhammad Muqaddas Husayn
Binnabaid Darul Uloom Dakhil Madrasa	Muhammad Hafiz Uddin
South Bateshwar Sabuz Palli Dakhil Madrasa	Muhammad Hannan Miah
Chitail Dakhil Madrasa	Abdur Rashid
Sutriya Fadlul Haqq Khan Dakhil Madrasa	Siddiqur Rahman

== Economy and tourism ==
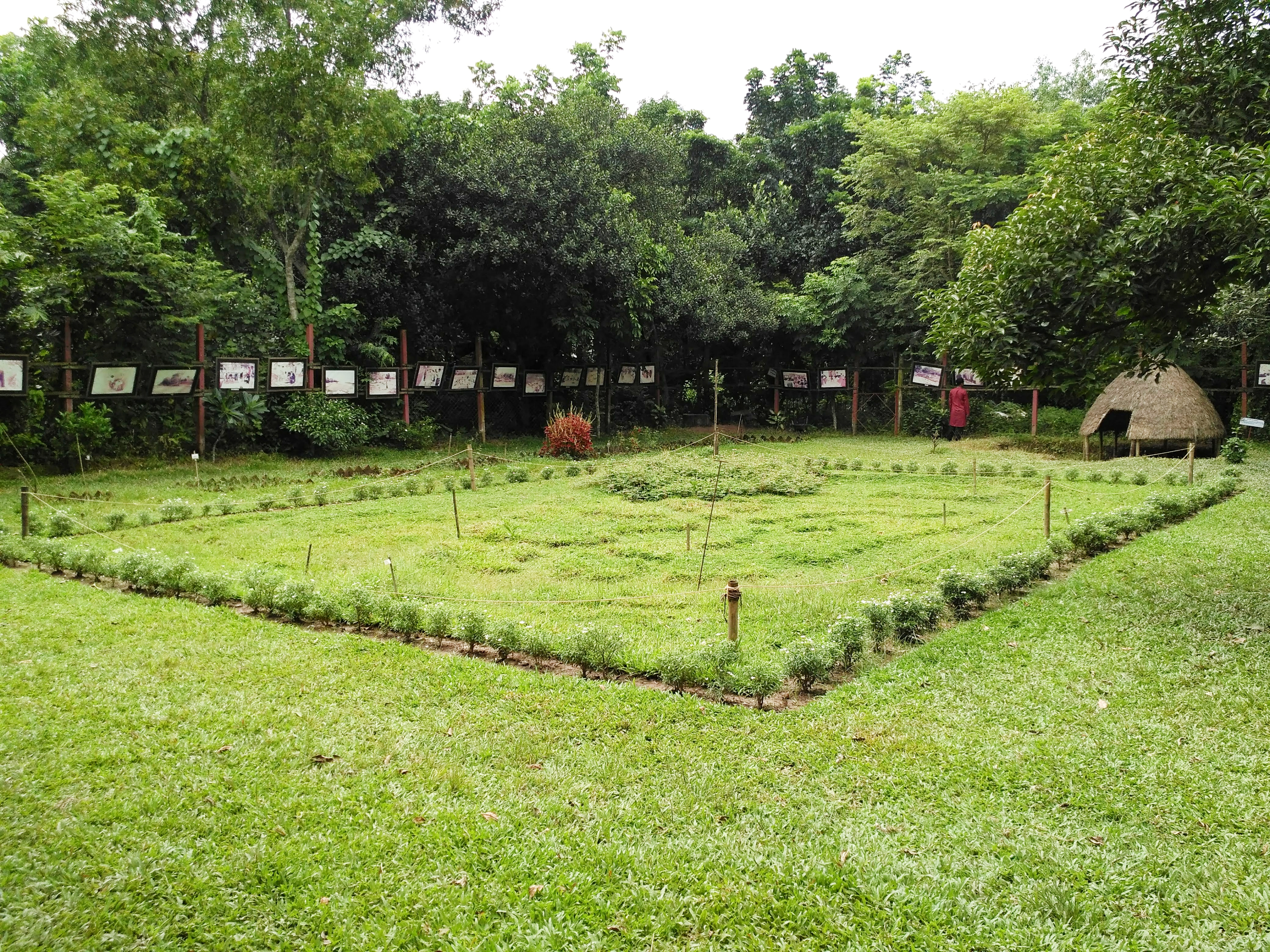
Wari-Bateshwar Fort City Open-Air Museum

Belabo is home to numerous tourist attractions and archeological sites such as the ancient Wari-Bateshwar ruins and the medieval Maharanir Dighi lake, which is the largest reservoir in eastern Dhaka Division. The mosque of Belabo Bazar and Sultanate-era mausoleum of Shah Irani are also notable as well as the Matialpara and Baribari war memorials.

== Notable people ==
Voice of Abdul Jalil, arrested in the Agartala Conspiracy Case.

- Abdul Hamid, educationist
- Abdul Jalil, sergeant associated with the Agartala Conspiracy Case
- Hanif Pathan, folklorist and antiquarian
- Muhammad Habibullah Pathan, researcher and archaeologist
- Rashiduddin Ahmad, neurosurgeon and sportsperson buried in Belabo

== See also ==
- Upazilas of Bangladesh
- Districts of Bangladesh
- Divisions of Bangladesh
