= Monohardi Upazila =

Monohardi মনোহরদী
- Upazila
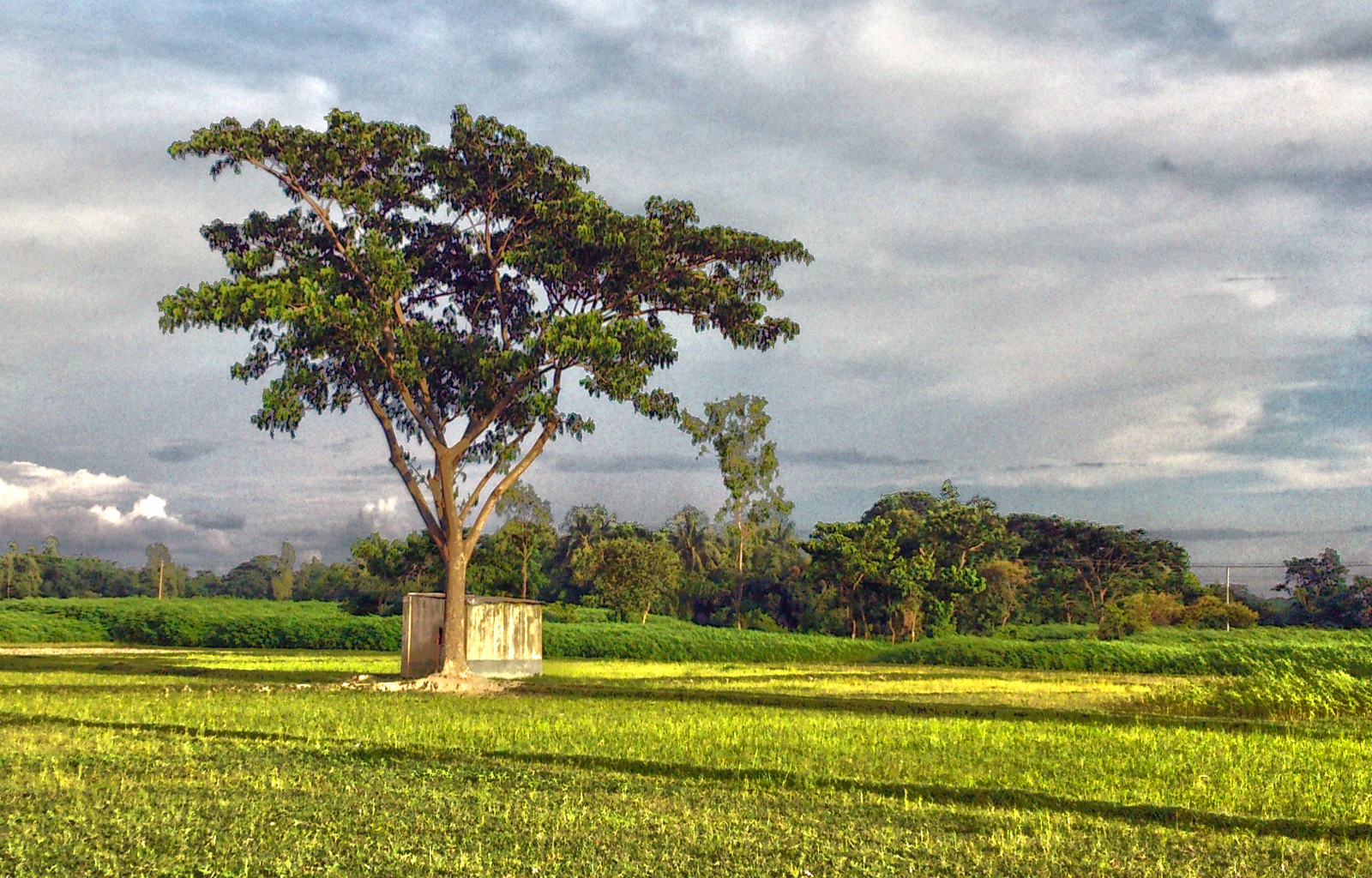
- Crop Fields in Monohardi

- Coordinates: 24°7.7′N 90°42′E
- Country: Bangladesh
- Division: Dhaka
- District: Narsingdi

Area
  - Total: 193.87 km^{2} (74.85 sq mi)

Population (2022)
  - Total: 298,609
  - Density: 1,540.3/km^{2} (3,989.2/sq mi)
- Time zone: UTC+6 (BST)
- Postal code: 1650
- Area code: 06253
- Website: monohardi.narsingdi.gov.bd

Monohardi (Bengali: মনোহরদী) is an upazila of Narsingdi District in the Division of Dhaka, Bangladesh.

== Geography ==
Monohardi is located at 24.1278°N 90.7000°E. It has 63,385 households and total area 193.87 km^{2}.

This upazila is located near the Brahmaputra river. According to Banglapedia Monohardi is bounded by pakundia and katiadi upazilas on the north, shibpur upazila on the south, Belabo and Katiadi upazilas on the east, Kapasia upazila on the west.

== Demographics ==
Religions in Monohardi Upazila (2022)
Religion	Percent
Islam	95.41%
Hinduism	4.58%
Other or not stated	0.01%

According to the 2022 Bangladeshi census, Manohardi Upazila had 75,940 households and a population of 298,609. 9.14% of the population were under 5 years of age. Manohardi had a literacy rate (age 7 and over) of 75.30%: 76.46% for males and 74.30% for females, and a sex ratio of 88.09 males for every 100 females. 38,798 (12.99%) lived in urban areas.

According to the 2011 Census of Bangladesh, Monohardi Upazila had 63,385 households and a population of 275,112. 65,173 (23.69%) were under 10 years of age. Monohardi had a literacy rate (age 7 and over) of 49.94%, compared to the national average of 51.8%, and a sex ratio of 1095 females per 1000 males. 21,422 (7.79%) lived in urban areas.

As of the 1991 Bangladesh census, Males constitute 50.39% of the population, and females 49.61%. This Upazila's eighteen up population is 122359. Monohardi has an average literacy rate of 27.3% (7+ years), and the national average of 32.4% literate. According to Banglapedia, there are 1 municipality, 11 unions and 170 villages in this Upazila.

== Administration ==
Monohardi Upazila is divided into Monohardi Municipality and 11 union parishads: Barachapa, Chalakchar, Chandanbari, Charmandalia, Daulatpur, Ekduaria, Gotashia, Kanchikata, Khidirpur, Lebutala, and Shukundi. The union parishads are subdivided into 119 mauzas and 165 villages.

Monohardi Municipality is subdivided into 9 wards and 12 mahallas.

== Education ==
There are eight colleges in the upazila: Afazuddin Khan Mohila College, Barachapa Moha Biddalay, Barachapa Union Adarsha Degree College, Hatirdia Raziuddin College, Khidirpur College, Monohardi Degree College, Panch Kandi Degree College, and Sarder Asmat Ali Mohila College.

According to Banglapedia, Monohardi Govt. Pilot Model High School, founded in 1948, Chalak Char High School, founded in 1933, Chandanbari S A Pilot High School, founded in 1961, Hatirdia Sadat Ali Model High School (1941), Khidirpur High School (1912), LK Union High School (1950) are notable secondary schools.

== See also ==
- Upazilas of Bangladesh
- Districts of Bangladesh
- Divisions of Bangladesh
