= Rampal Union =

Union Parishad in Munshiganj, Dhaka, Bangladesh

Rampal Union রামপাল ইউনিয়ন
- Union
- Location in Bangladesh
- Coordinates: 23.5409°N 90.4924°E
- Country: Bangladesh
- Division: Dhaka
- District: Munshiganj
- Upazila: Munshiganj Sadar Upazila
- Established: 1984

Government
  - Type: Union council
  - Chairman: Md. Bachchu Sheikh

Area
  - Total: 20.72 km^{2} (8.00 sq mi)

Population (2022)
  - Total: 39,394
  - Density: 1,901/km^{2} (4,924/sq mi)
- Time zone: UTC+6 (BST)
- Postal code: 1502
- Website: rampalup.munshiganj.gov.bd

Rampal Union (Bengali: রামপাল ইউনিয়ন) is a union parishad in Munshiganj Sadar Upazila of Munshiganj District, in Dhaka, Bangladesh.

== Distinguished Identity ==
Rampal Union shines as an important place in Munshiganj District in various aspects, including education, culture, religious events, and sports.

== Statistics ==
=== Area ===
- Total Area: 20.72 km^{2}

=== Geography ===
- Mouza: 10
- Villages: 24
- Thana: 8303
- Population: 39,394 (Male: 20,766, Female: 18,628)

=== Land ===
- Total Land Area: 1869.15 acres

=== Education ===
- Male Education Rate: 86%
- Female Education Rate: 72%

=== Demographics ===
- Birth Rate: 1.28% increase
- Mortality Rate: 0.73%

== Educational Institutions ==
=== Primary School ===
- Panhata Government Primary School
- Joradewl Government Primary School
- Sukhabaspur 1 No. Government Primary School
- Sukhabaspur 2 No. Government Primary School
- Panam Government Primary School
- Milkipara Government Primary School
- Kazi Kasba Kazipara Government Primary School
- Kazi Kasba mosjidbari Government Primary School
- Rampal Government Primary School
- South Dewsar Government Primary School
- Kalinchipara Government Primary School

=== High School ===
- Basirannesa High School
- Sukhabaspur shyamnalini High School
- Rampal Nafisi Begum Memorial High School

=== College ===
- Rampal College

== Political system ==
Rampal Union Parishad has nine members from all nine wards. The main leader is the Union Parishad Chairman. Every five years, people select their leadership. Currently, Rampal Union Parishad chairman's name is Md. Bachchu Sheikh. People call him Bachchu Chairman.

== Current Council ==
=== Chairman ===
- Md. Bachchu Sheikh

=== Reserved Seat Members ===
- Member No. 01: Helena Begum
- Member No. 02: Sanjida Yasmin
- Member No. 03: Halima Begum

=== Ward Members ===
- Ward No. 01: Md. Abdur Rauf Mia
- Ward No. 02: Md Hazrat Ali Litton
- Ward No. 03: Md. Mohiuddin Sheikh
- Ward No. 04: Md. Saeed Hasan Sunny
- Ward No. 05: Md. Ali Azgar Bepari
- Ward No. 06: Md. Akhtar Hossain
- Ward No. 07: Abdul Karim
- Ward No. 08: Kazi Fulan
- Ward No. 09: Md. Shahabuddin Shani

== Notable people ==
- M Shamsul Islam- Former MP, Former Minister of Information, Lands, Commerce, Food, Posts and Telecommunications.
- Chatku Ahmed- Film director, Producer, dialogue writer and screenwriter.
- Noyeem Gahar- Famous lyricist of Bangladesh.
- Elora Gohor- Film and television actress.
- MD. Mosharaf Hossain- Chairman of Mosharaf Group, Director of BTMA.
- Sayeeful Islam- Managing Director of Concorde Garments Group & SSL Wireless, Former Honorary Consul of Brazil in Bangladesh. Former Dhaka Chamber of Commerce and Industry (DCCI) President and Chairman of The Duke of Edinburgh's Award Foundation (Bangladesh)

== Tourist Spot ==
- Raja Ballal Sen's Dighi or Rampal Dighi
- Shukhbashpur Dighi
- Baba Adam's Mosque
- Bikrampur Bihar
- Harishchandra's Dighi
- Panam Jorar Deul Jame Mosjid
- Polghata Bridge
