= Baba Adam Shahid =

15th-century Muslim figure in Bengal

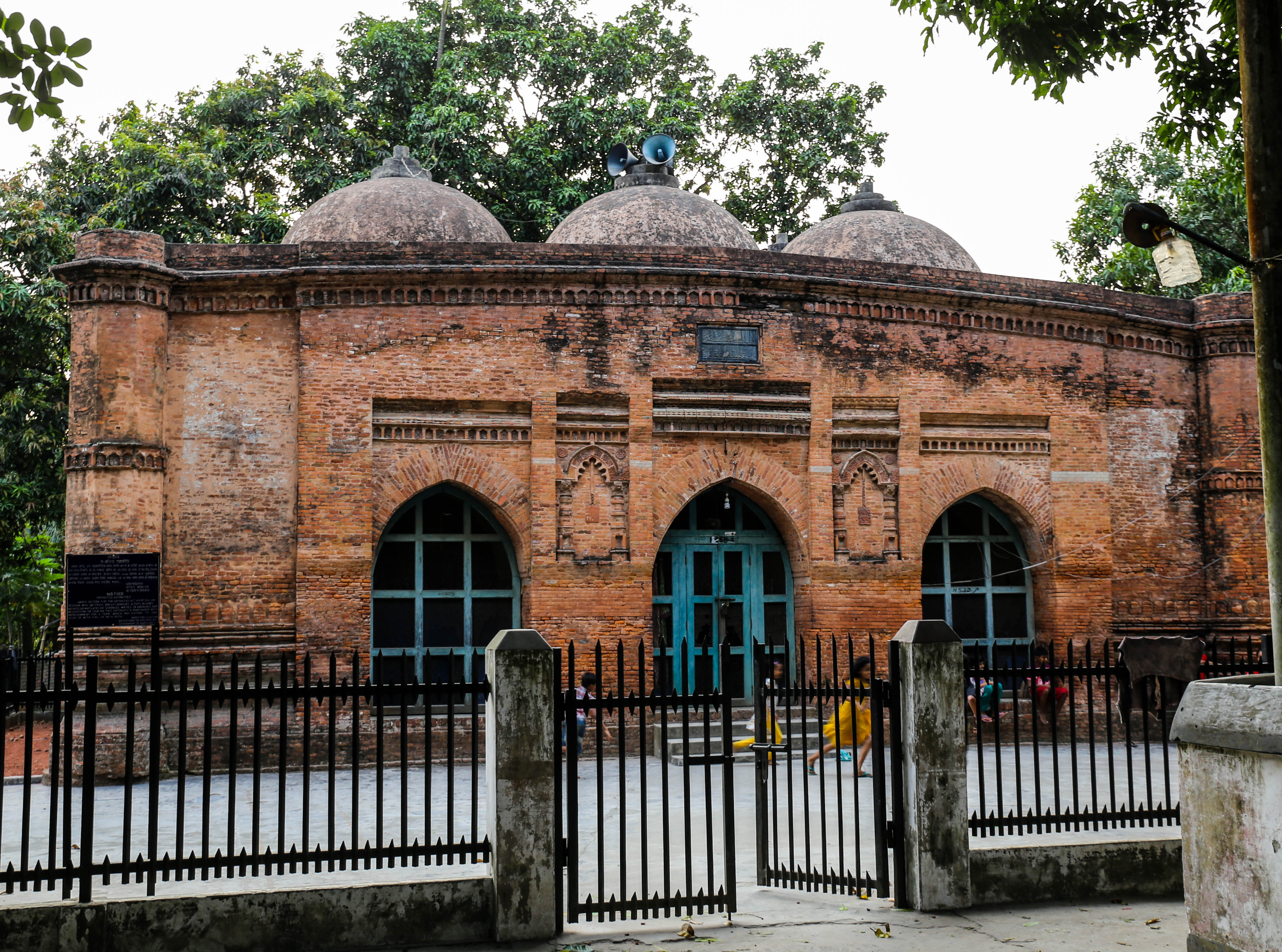
- Front view of Baba Adam's Mosque

Personal life
- Died: Bikrampur, Bengal Sultanate
- Resting place: Kazi Qasba, Rampal Union, Munshiganj, Bangladesh

Religious life
- Religion: Islam
- Denomination: Sunni

Muslim leader
- Period in office: 15th century

Baba Adam Shahid (Bengali: বাবা আদম শহীদ, romanized: Baba Adom Shohīd) was a 15th-century Muslim figure in Bengal.

== Biography ==
Baba Adam was a fakir who resided in Mecca, according to local Bengali Muslim folklore. A Muslim villager from Kanaichang, located in the kingdom of Vikramapura (in present-day Munshiganj District, Bangladesh), sought refuge in Mecca after facing religious persecution. The villager had attempted to perform the ritual sacrifice of a cow to commemorate his son's aqiqah, a customary Islamic practice. This act, however, was not appreciated by the local ruler, Raja Vallalasena. As a Hindu monarch from the Baidya caste, he and his citizens regarded cows as sacred animals. To preserve the sanctity of the land, he interrupted the Muslim villager from the sacrifice.

The villager fled to Mecca and, with a spirit of anger, compelled Baba Adam to travel to Vikramapura, accompanied by a following that numbered 7000 Muslims. His mission was to seek revenge and to confront the alleged injustice, which did not incline to respect the local culture. In response, Raja Vallalasena mobilised his forces to resist Baba Adam's advance. During a critical moment in the confrontation, Baba Adam is said to have temporarily withdrawn from the battlefield in Kanaichang to a nearby cave in order to perform the afternoon prayer of Asr. There, after the prayer, he was discovered by the Raja, who struck him down. Baba Adam's death was regarded by his companions as martyrdom, earning him the posthumous title of Shahid (martyr). His legacy continues to be honored in the region through oral tradition and local devotion.

== Legacy ==
Adam was buried in a tomb now situated in the courtyard of a mosque constructed by Jalaluddin Fateh Shah's officer Malik Kafur in 888 AH (1483-1484 AD). The mosque is known as Baba Adam's Mosque and is a protected monument visited by many tourists.

Known in Hindu literature as "Bayadumba the Mleccha" (Sanskrit: म्लेच्छ बायादुम्ब), Adam's story is mentioned in the Vallalacharita. This book was written by a 16th-century Shaivist commentator by the name of Ananda Bhatta at the request of Sri Buddhimanta Khan, the Raja of Nabadwip.
