= Abdul Hakim Bikrampuri =

Bangladeshi politician

Member of the Bengal Legislative Assembly
- In office 1937–1947
- Constituency: Munshiganj

Member of 3rd National Assembly of Pakistan
- In office 1962–1965
- Succeeded by: A.B.M. Nurul Islam
- Constituency: NE-37 (Faridpur-cum-Dacca)

Personal details
- Born: 5 March 1893 Courtgaon, Bikrampur, Bengal Presidency
- Died: 4 July 1987 (aged 94) Dacca, Bangladesh

Abdul Hakim Bikrampuri (Bengali: আব্দুল হাকিম বিক্রমপুরী) was a Bangladeshi politician, teacher and writer. He was a member of the Bengal Legislative Assembly, East Bengal Provincial Assembly and the 3rd National Assembly of Pakistan.

== Early life ==
Bikrampuri was born on 5 March 1893, to a Bengali Muslim parents Ibrahim Husayn and Elem Jan Bibi from the village of Courtgaon in Bikrampur, Dhaka District. He passed his matriculation from Munshiganj High School in 1913. He subsequently enrolled at the Dhaka College where he studied for his Intermediate of Arts. However, due to his physical illnesses at the time, his studies were ceased.

== Career ==
Bikrampuri began his career as a teacher at the Munshiganj High School. He also began writing poetry, stories and articles. In 1936, he joined the Krishak Praja Party under the leadership of A. K. Fazlul Huq and represented the party from the Bikrampur constituency. He was successful in the elections and elected twice into the Bengal Legislative Assembly. After the Partition of India, Bikrampuri was a member of the East Bengal Provincial Assembly from 1946 to 1954. He was also a member of the 3rd National Assembly of Pakistan from 1962 to 1965. His constituency, Faridpur-cum-Dacca, covered Tongibari, Louhajang, Naria, Bhedarganj and Sureshwar. He also served as an advisor to Azam Khan, the erstwhile Governor of East Pakistan.

Bikrampuri wrote a critical review of female Muslim writers Saogat. His writings can also be found in magazines such as The Mohammadi, Prabasi, Manasi, Marmabani, Samyabadi and Soltan. His article drew sharp rejoinders from Begum Rokeya and Mrs M. Rahman. He was also the editor of a magazine known as Gramer Kotha. In 1942, he established the K. K. Government Vidya Niketan.

Among his books are:

1. চীনে ইসলাম (Chine Islam)
2. সাহিত্যের কথা (Sahityer Kotha)
3. পানের বরোজ (Paner Boroj)
4. হযরত শাহ্ আহসান উল্লাহ (Hazrat Shah Ahsan Ullah)

== Death and legacy ==
Bikrampuri died in Dacca, on 4 July 1987. Abul Kalam Shamsuddin wrote with regards to Bikrampuri: "Bikrampuri Saheb deprived Bengali literature by going into politics".
