= A M Nurul Islam =

Bangladeshi politician and bureaucrat (1939–2017)

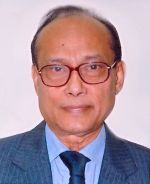
A M Nurul Islam (Anu) নুরুল ইসলাম অনু

Nurul Islam Anu (Bengali: নূরুল ইসলাম অনু; 1939–2017), also known as A M Nurul Islam (Anu), was a Bangladeshi politician and bureaucrat. He started his career in the erstwhile Civil Services of Pakistan (C.S.P.) in 1963 and joined the Government of Bangladesh after independence in 1971. He was the private secretary to the former Prime Minister of Bangladesh Sheikh Mujibur Rahman (1972 to 1973). He was the longest-serving president of the U.S. chapter of Bangladesh Awami League (1989–2002).

== Early life ==
A M Nurul Islam (Anu) was born on 14 December 1939, in Courtgaon of Munshiganj District, Dhaka Division, Bangladesh. His father was Sirajul Islam, and his mother was Edanessa Begum. He is the elder brother of A J M Enamul Islam, the Secretary General of the Commonwealth Society of Bangladesh, and also an established Bangladeshi businessman. He is the younger brother of Firoza Begum and Hosneara Chowdhury, former director of the Department of Social Services. Anu is the nephew of Abdul Hakim Bikrampuri, a former member of the Undivided Bengal Legislative Assembly and Pakistan Provisional and National Assembly.

He received M.A. in history from University of Dhaka in 1961 and worked as a lecturer at the university till joining the Civil Services of Pakistan in 1963.

He was married to Mohsina Islam.

== Career ==
=== Civil service ===
A M Nurul Islam (Anu) worked in various capacities of the District and Civil Administration under the governments of Pakistan (1963–1971) and Bangladesh (1972–1975). During Bangladesh's liberation war in 1971, despite being under the then East Pakistan government, he played a pivotal role from within the administration, helping the exiled Mujibnagar government. He was given the assignment to bring Bangabhaban to order after the surrender of the Pakistan army on 16 December 1971; fix the damaged infrastructure and mobilize Bangabhaban's staff before the arrival of the exiled leaders of the first government of Bangladesh from Mujibnagar. Following, the installation of the first government of the People's Republic of Bangladesh, Anu was inducted in the administration as the joint secretary to President Abu Sayeed Chowdhury, in 1972. Soon, he got transferred to the Prime Minister's Office and appointed as the private secretary to Prime Minister Sheikh Mujibur Rahman (1972–1973). In 1973, Anu was attached to the Ministry of Foreign Affairs, and assigned in the High Commission of Bangladesh in Washington D.C. as its Economic and Trade Counselor.

Anu continued his career as a diplomat till 15 August 1975, when he resigned in protest of the assassination of President Sheikh Mujibur Rahman and declined to join the following governments of Khondaker Mostaq Ahmad and Ziaur Rahman.

For his outstanding contributions to shaping the civil administration of Bangladesh, Anu was awarded the Mother Teresa Gold Medal in 2010 by the Mother Teresa Research Council.

=== Politics ===
Being a career civil servant, Nurul Islam was not affiliated with a political party until 1975 when he resigned from government service. Following his resignation as a diplomat, he joined the Bangladesh Awami League and was instrumental in the formation of the party's U.S. chapter (U.S. Awami League) in 1982. In 1989, Nurul Islam was elected the president of the U.S. Awami League, in the presence of the president of the Bangladesh Awami League, Sheikh Hasina, and went on to become the longest-serving president U.S. Awami League (1989–2002).

Anu was an influential member of the Awami League's election coordination team for the 1991 and 1996 parliamentary elections.

=== Private sector and print media ===
Following resignation from the High Commission of Bangladesh, Anu entered the field of business and settled in Maryland, U.S.A. He established an international commodity trading and consulting company, Transcontinental IMEX Plc., and was president for over 20 years. Anu moved back to Bangladesh from the United States of America in 2004 and got involved in the country's banking sector. He was the director of National Bank Limited, a private commercial bank, from 2005 to 2008 and was in charge of the bank's audit committee from 2007 to 2008.

2008 Anu joined another private commercial bank, Bank Asia Limited, as its director. In 2009, he became the bank's vice chairman and remained in the position till his death on 18 October 2017. During this time, he headed the bank's Audit and Risk Management Committees in various phases. In 2013, Anu joined the Opex Group, one of Bangladesh's leading ready-made garment exporting companies, as its financial advisor and remained there until his death.

From 2009 to 2013, Nurul Islam Anu was the editor and, later publisher, of the Bengali newspaper, the Daily Shokaler Khobor (Bengali: দৈনিক সকালের খবর). He was also a columnist for The Daily Star, writing political commentaries in the country's most circulated English newspaper.

== Death ==
Nurul Islam Anu died on 18 October 2017. President of Bangladesh Abdul Hamid and Prime Minister Sheikh Hasina issued separate condolence messages remembering the contributions of Nurul Islam.

The U.S. Awami League in New York, and its affiliated organizations across North America, organized prayer and memorial services in honor of Nurul Islam Anu.

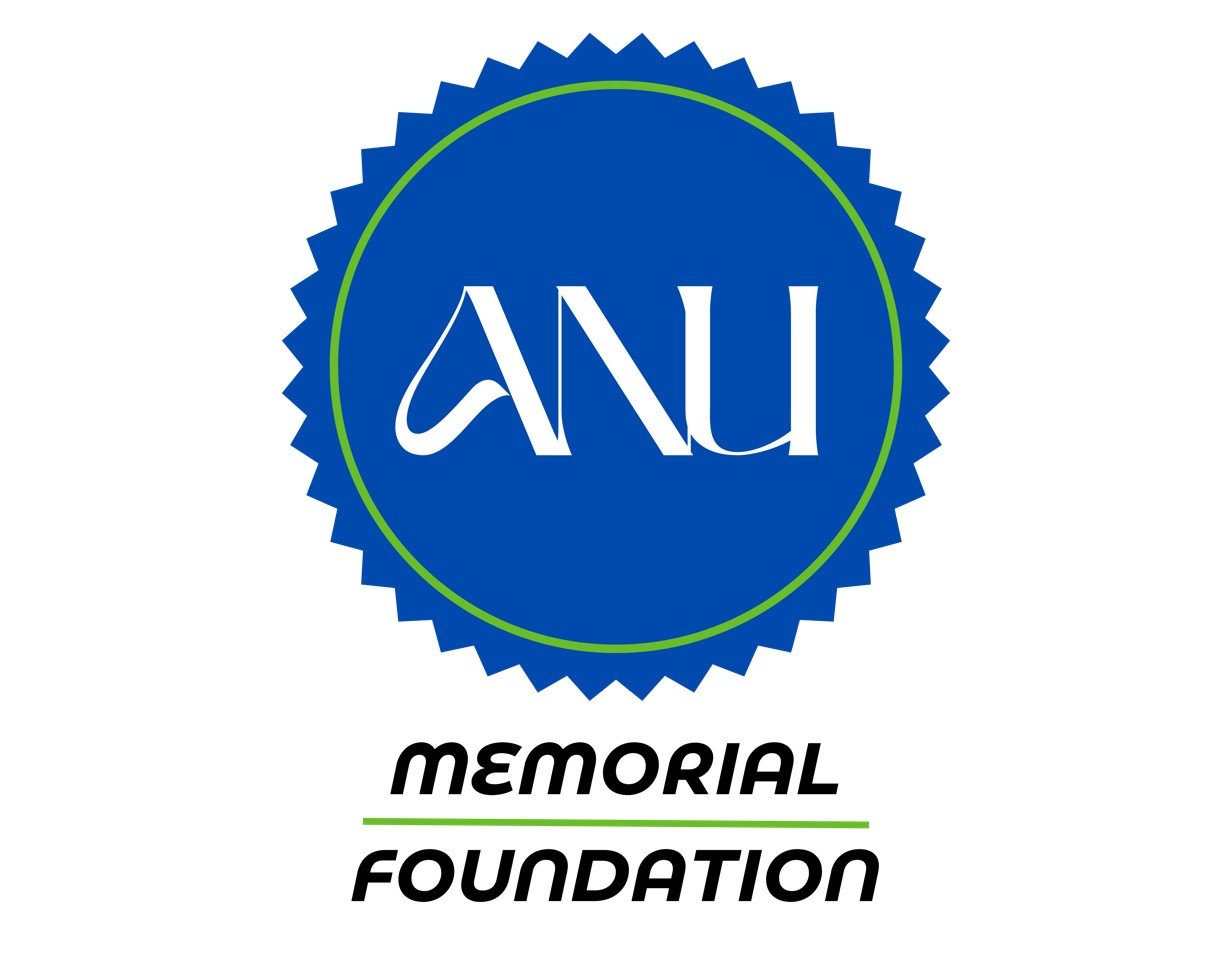
Logo of Anu Memorial Foundation

=== Anu Memorial Foundation ===
To honor his legacy, family members of A M Nurul Islam Anu came together and formed the "Anu Memorial Foundation (AMF)" to continue his mission of selfless service to the nation and its people through various philanthropic and welfare activities. AMF is a nonprofit organization established with a vision to promote and advance charity and welfare activities that can aid the well-being of communities and the citizens of Bangladesh. The foundation's governing board, among others, has A J M Enamul Islam as its president and Arafat Ashwad Islam as the board secretary.
