= Munshiganj Medical College =

- Type: Public Medical College
- Established: 2026
- Academic affiliation: Dhaka University
- Location: Munshiganj
- Campus: Urban
- Language: English

Munshiganj Medical College is a proposed government medical college located in Munshiganj District. It was officially approved on 1 January 2026.
