= Nateshwar Deul =

Archaeological site in Bangladesh

Natshwar
- নাটেশ্বর (Bengali)
- Location of Nateshwar in Bangladesh
- 23.531680°N 90.469358°E
- Type: Stupa, Buddhist Vihara
- Location: Tongibari, Munshiganj District
- Region: Bangladesh
- Part of: Jia Bang Lao (as mentioned in the biography of Atiśa Dīpankara Śrījñāna)

History
- Built: 780 CE
- Abandoned: 1223 CE

Site notes
- Material: Soil
- Area: 10 acres (4.0 ha)
- Architectural style: Buddhist architecture
- Archaeologists: Oitijjo Onneshon Gobeshona (Heritage Exploration Research, Jahangirnagar University), Comilla University, Institute of Cultural Relics and Archaeology of Hunan Province, China
- Owner: Ministry of Cultural Affairs
- Management: Shah Sufi Mustafizur Rahman, Jahangirnagar University; Agrashar Bikrampur Foundation

Nateshwar Deul (Bengali: নাটেশ্বর দেউল, romanized: Nāṭēśśôr Dēul, lit. 'Temple complex of Nateshwar') is a Buddhist archaeological site located in the village of Nateshwar in Tongibari Upazila in the Munshiganj District, Bangladesh. It is the ruin of a Buddhist city established from 780 to 950 CE and from 950 to 1223 CE in the Bikrampur region. Archaeological excavation began at Nateshwar in 2012–13. From 2013 to 2018, an area of approximately 500 square metres (5,400 sq ft) was excavated. Sixteen Buddhist stupas, including Bangladesh's only pyramid-shaped one, have been found in Nateshwar.

== History ==
Bikrampur was Bengal's capital during the Chandra, Verma, and Sena dynasties. Atiśa Dīpankara Śrījñāna (982–1054 CE) described this region in his writings:

There is a country in the eastern part of India, named Jia Bang Lao. There are thousands of buildings in the capital city. The palace of the city is gilded with gold.

— Atiśa Dīpankara Śrījñāna

The ancient Buddhist ruins found during the excavations at Nateshwar and Raghurampur of Munshiganj Sadar Upazila indicate that by that time Bikrampur may have been a center for Buddhist pilgrimage. From Atiśa's writings, it is estimated that there were almost 25,000 Buddhist temples in the "temple-city" where he was born. The pyramid-shaped structure found at Nateshwar was perhaps Atiśa's place of worship or the centre of his preaching.

== Archaeological excavation ==
The "glory of Bikrampur" was previously thought to have disappeared in the Padma's riverbed, namely the "Kirtinasha" (Bengali: কীর্তিনাশা, romanized: Kīrtināśā, lit. 'Destroyer of the achievements'). The location of Bikrampur (along with Wari-Bateshwar and Nateshwar) first came to be discussed in the writings of historian Nalini Kanta Bhattasali, the first curator of the Dhaka Museum. In 2010, the first archaeological excavation work began at nine locations in three villages across Rampal and Bajrayogini; it uncovered the Bikrampur Vihara at Raghurampur, which has been carbon-dated to be from 990 to 1050 CE. Excavations in Nateshwar began in 2012–13. A research team from a Chinese archaeological institute joined the project in 2014.

During the excavation in 2012–13, a human settlement was unearthed at Nateshwar. Beginning in 2013, Buddhist temples, octagonal stupas, pathways and drains made of bricks were unearthed. Moreover, a 100-square-metre (1,100 sq ft) temple from the 8th–9th century was found next to the octagonal stupas. From 2013 to 2019, approximately 6,000 square metres (65,000 sq ft) were excavated at Nateshwar.

Samcaẏa ādhāra or a depository with red and black copper coins was found. Earthen cooking pots, water pots, lamps, etc. were among some of the other archaeological findings. Some of the stupas found at Nateshwar are interlinked with three other stupas; each of them is called a Chaturstūpa. The stupas have 4-metre (13 ft) thick walls. The two pairs of Chaturstūpas are unique in Bangladesh.

During the excavations of 2019–20, a pyramid-shaped stupa was unearthed, the largest found in Bangladesh to date.

== Architecture ==
As of August 2020, sixteen stupas have been unearthed at Nateshwar. They were constructed in a Buddhist architectural style. They are mainly tombs or burial chambers, and an important part of Buddhist architecture. They reflect the views and culture of Buddhist civilisation, and are sometimes seen as the symbol of Buddhism introduced by Gautam Buddha. The stupas of Nateshwar can be compared to the Mahastupas of Sanchi, Bharhut, Amaravati, and Sarnath. Buddhist stupas are predominantly dome-shaped. However, a unique pyramid-shaped stupa has been excavated at Nateshwar.

After carbon-14 testing of 26 specimens of charcoal found in the excavations, America's Beta Analytic Inc. Laboratory fixed two time periods for human settlement at Nateshwar. The first settlement began in 780 CE during the reign of the Deva dynasty (ca. 750–800 CE) and lasted until 950 CE during the Chandra regime (900–1050 CE). The second phase continued from 950 to 1223 CE and lasted through the reigns of the Chandras, Varman (ca. 1080–1150 CE), and Sena dynasties.

Further archaeological findings include the ruins of Buddhist monasteries with seven monastic rooms, two almost intact brick-paved roads, quadrilateral and octagonal stupas used for religious rituals or burials, and a 2.75-metre (9.0 ft) thick meandering wall on the south-east side, suggesting a well-planned city. The octagonal stupa occupies an area of about 25.2 square metres (271 sq ft). Each of its sides is 9.2 metres (30 ft) long; diagonally it measures 8.6 metres (28 ft). There is also a cross-shaped central Aṣṭamārga (eight ways) shrine that was used by the Vajrayana Buddhists. Pre-medieval Buddhist viharas (monasteries), panchastupas, octagonal stupas and a brick drainage system along with newly discovered brick pathways, an entrance gate to the stupa complex in the north, and multiple residences indicate a well-established city at Nateshwar. The upper walls of the Chaturstupas are wider than the lower walls. This style of architecture is different from other archaeological sites in Bangladesh. Pumicite has been used for the construction of those buildings, including the temples. This fine-grained pumice-like volcanic ash would have protected the structures from humidity.

The largest complete pyramid-shaped stupa in Bangladesh found during the excavations in 2019–20 occupies a total area of about 2,000 square metres (22,000 sq ft) with a height of about 44 metres (144 ft). It is 44 metres (144 ft) long to the south. The dais is 64 centimetres (25 in) high and 3 metres (9.8 ft) wide. Carbon dating in a laboratory in the US indicates the pyramid-shaped stupa was built during the period from 780 to 950 CE. Considering the time period, it was built before the birth of Atiśa (982–1054 CE).

There is also some evidence that new buildings were constructed over the older ones. At least five construction periods can be identified from a 7 metres (23 ft) depth.

== Future planning of archaeological site ==
Excavation work continues at Nateshwar. The archaeological findings from the site have been preserved in the Bikrampur Museum. The Bangladeshi government is planning to develop an archaeological park at Nateshwar after excavations are completed in 2024. Archaeologists expect that UNESCO will recognise Nateshwar as a World Heritage Site.
