= Munshiganj =

Municipality in Munshiganj District, Bangladesh

Munshiganj মুন্সীগঞ্জ
- Municipality
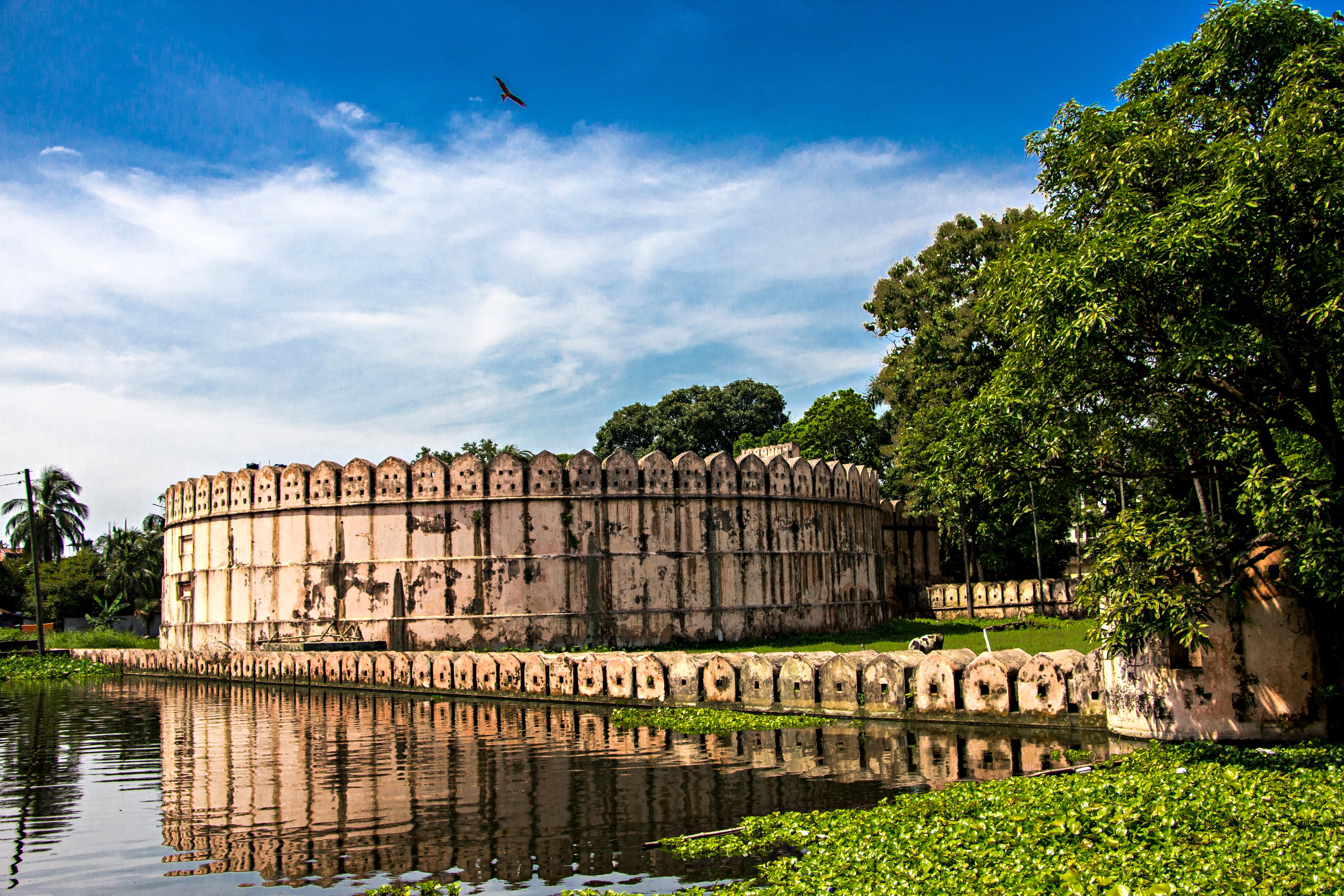
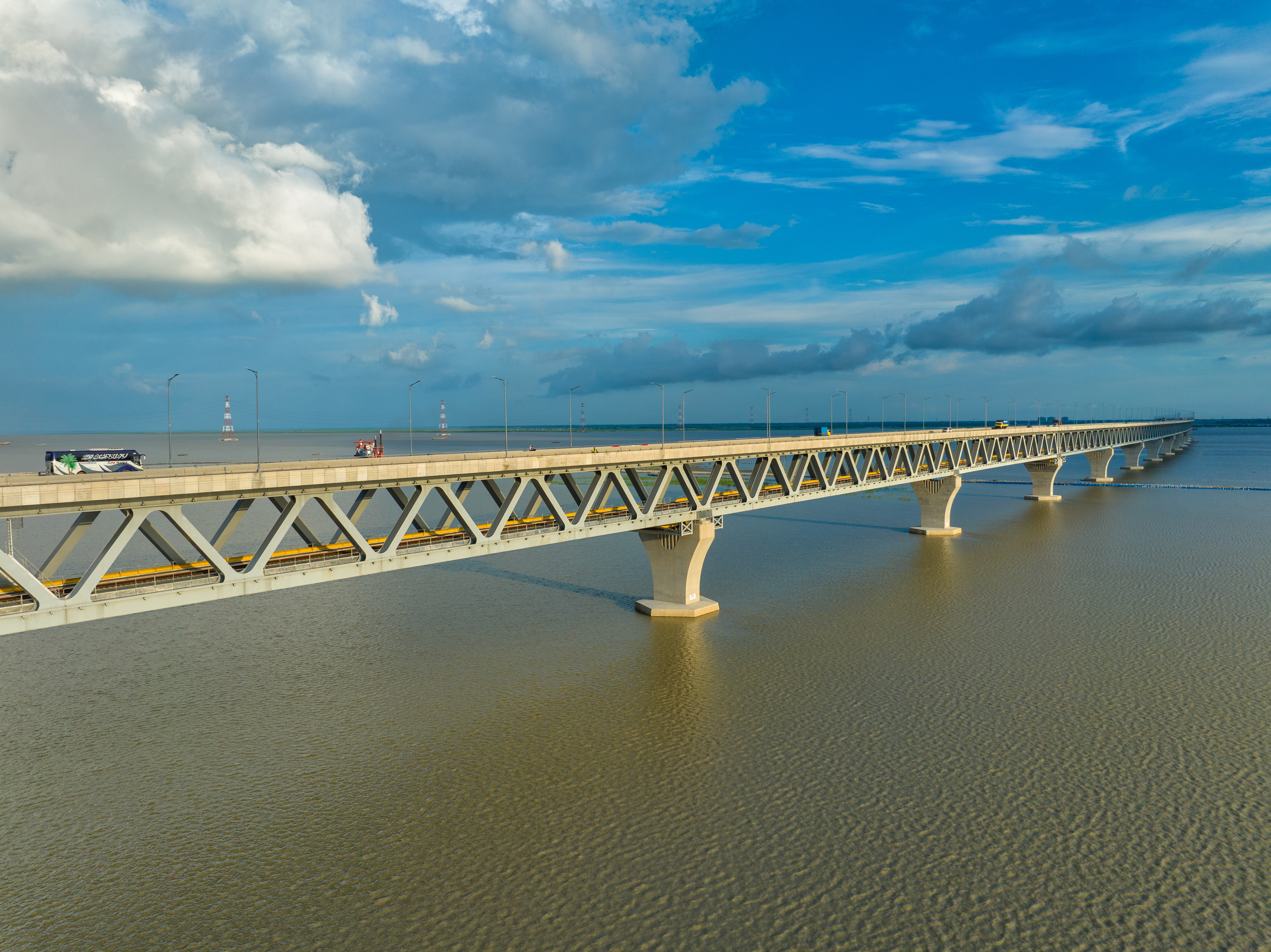
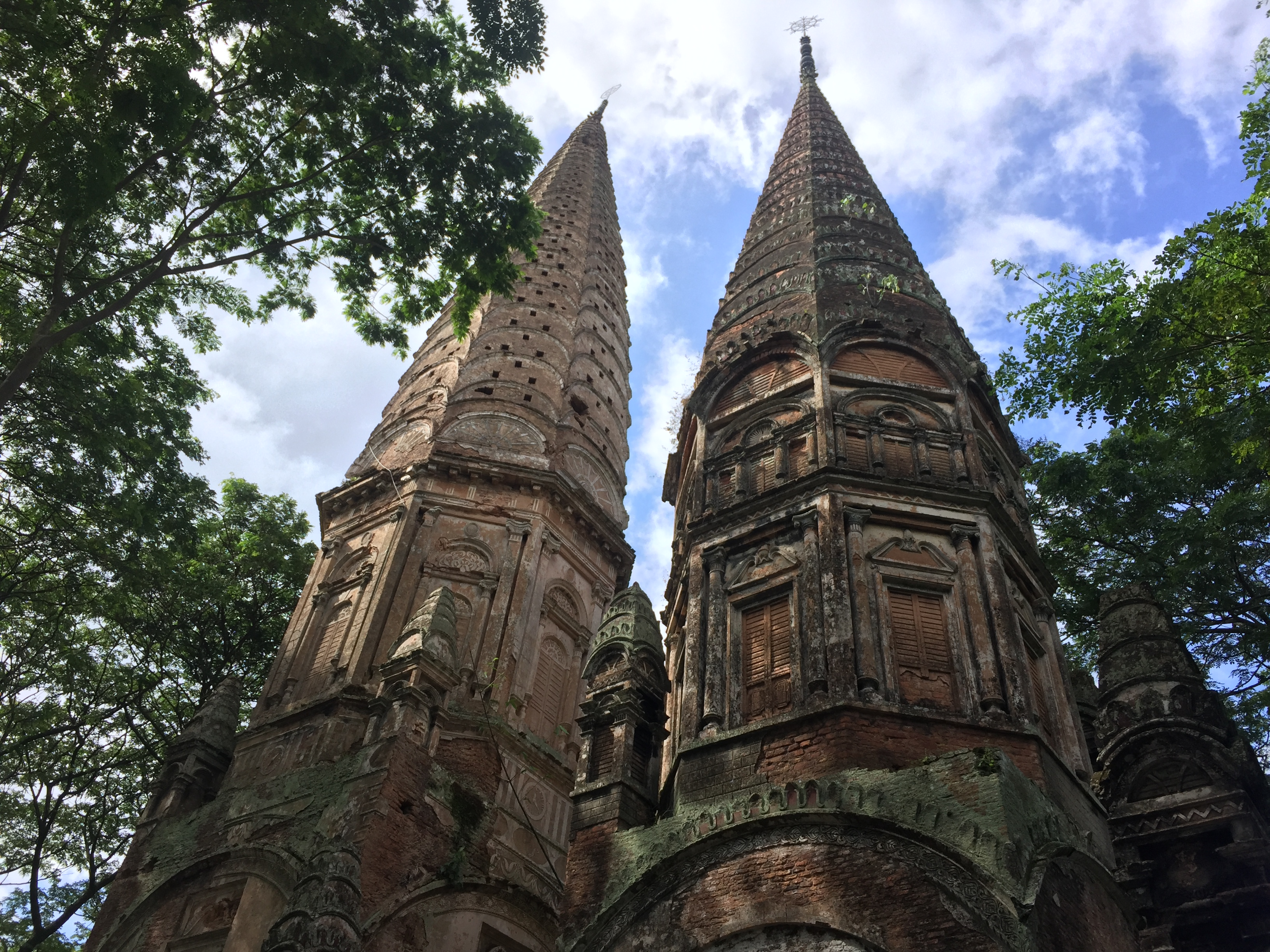
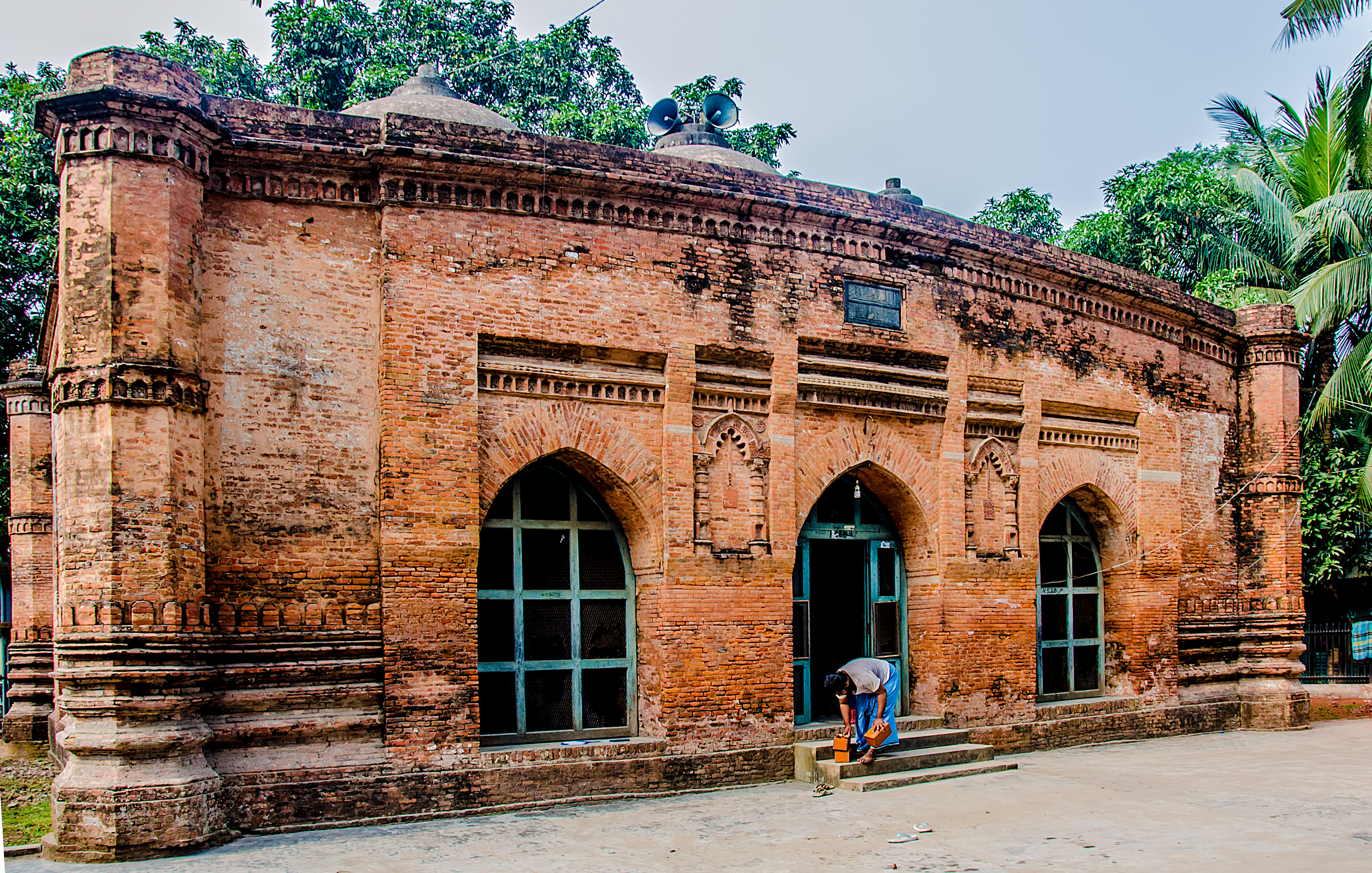
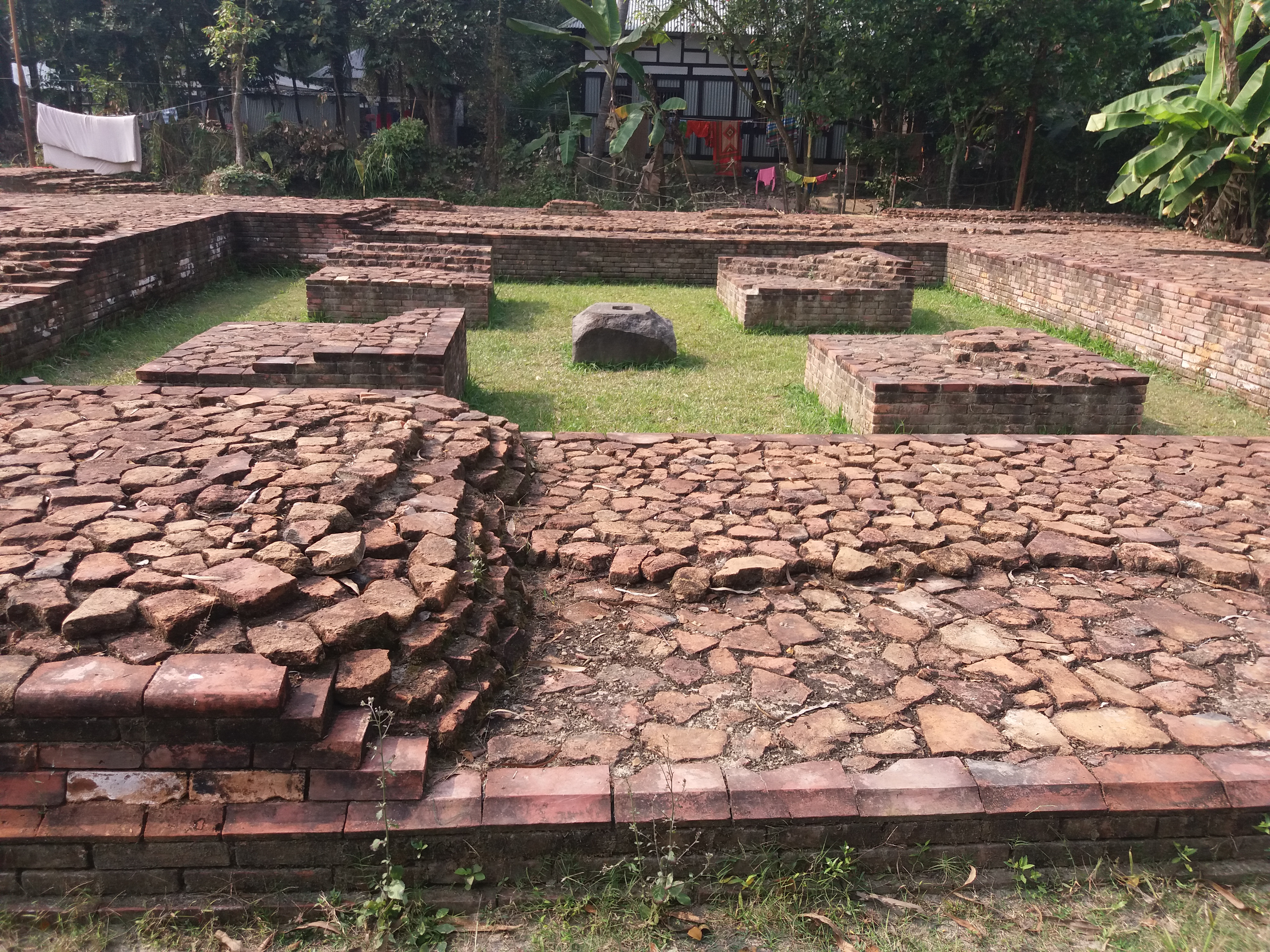
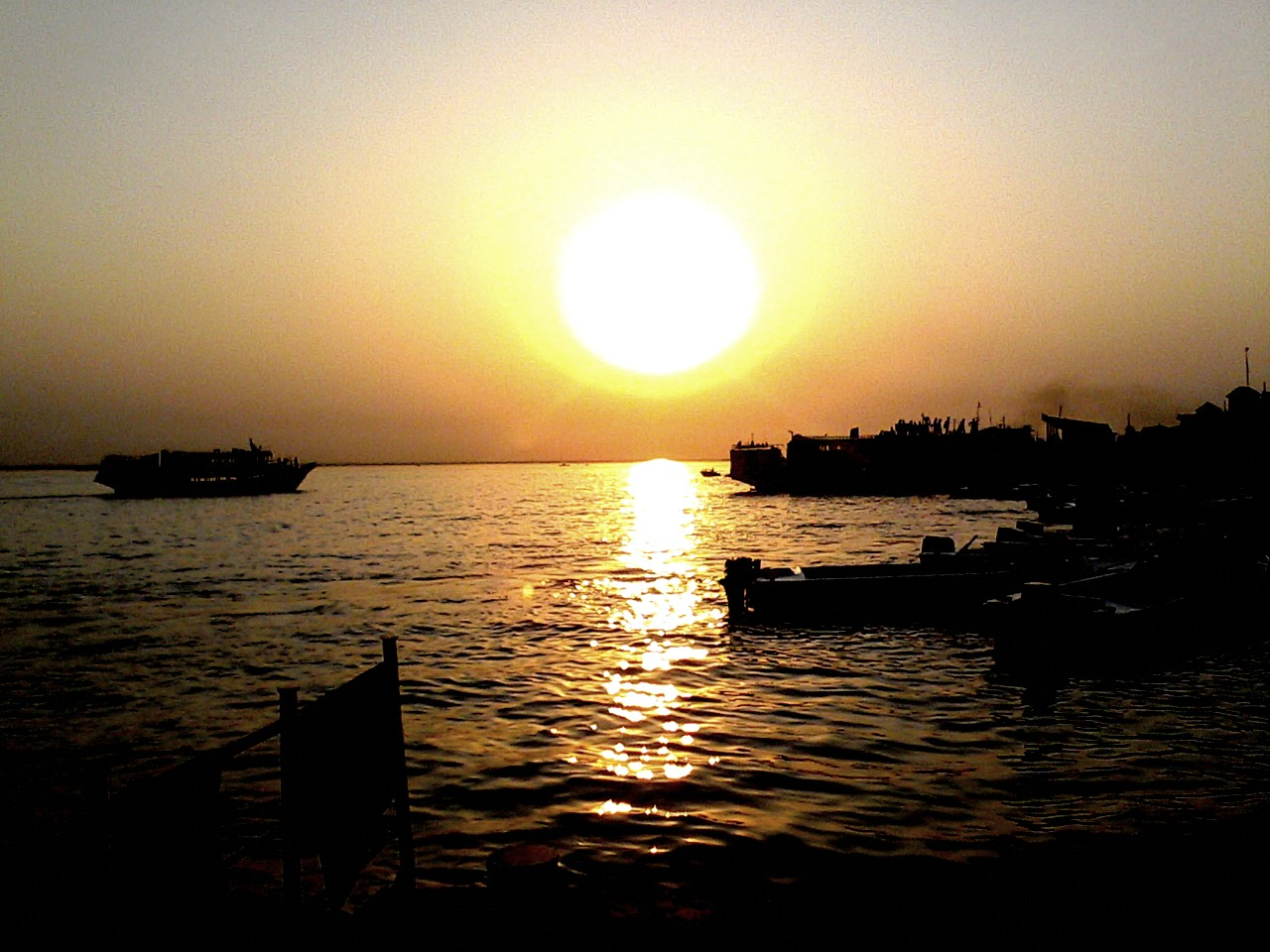
- Idrakpur Fort Padma Bridge Sonarang Twin Temples Baba Adam's Mosque Bikrampur Vihara Mawa Ferry Ghat

- Location within Dhaka division Location within Bangladesh
- Coordinates: 23.55°N 90.53°E
- Country: Bangladesh
- Division: Dhaka
- District: Munshiganj
- Upazila: Munshiganj Sadar

Government
  - Type: Mayor–Council
  - Body: Munshiganj Municipality

Population
  - Total: 70,674
- Time zone: UTC+06:00 (BST)

Munshiganj is a town in Dhaka division in central Bangladesh. It is the headquarters of Munshiganj District.

== Etymology ==
Munshiganj was originally known as Idrakpur. It is believed that during the Mughal era, a person named Munshi Haidar Hossain lived in Idrakpur, who was appointed as a Faujdar by the Mughal rulers. Due to his virtuous and philanthropic nature, Idrakpur was renamed Munshiganj in his honor. Some also suggest that the district was named after Zamindar Enayet Ali Munshi. Munshiganj was officially declared a district in 1984.

== Government ==
Civic administration

The East India Company acquired the right to collect taxes from Bengal, Bihar, and Orissa on behalf of the Emperor Mughal Emperor Shah Alam II in 1765, marking the beginning of revenue administration in the region. At that time, Munshiganj was part of Dhaka district. In 1769, Nathaniel Middleton independently managed the revenue administration, leasing out estates to the highest bidders, who in turn sub-leased them, leading to significant disorder in the revenue system. The Provincial Council operated from 1776 to 1781 to address these issues. In 1947, Munshiganj was established as a sub-division under Dhaka district. Munshiganj was declared a district in 1984, prior to which administrative matters were managed from Dhaka.

== Demographics ==
Religions in Munshiganj (2011)
Religion	Percent
Islam	91.53%
Hinduism	8.44%
Other or not stated	0.03%

At the time of the 2011 census, Munshiganj Paurashava had 15,133 households and a population of 70,674. 14,539 (20.57%) were under 10 years of age. Munshiganj had a sex ratio of 970 females per 1000 males and a literacy rate of 65.21%.
