= Sonarang Twin Temples =

Historical Twin Temple in Bangladesh

- সোনারং জোড়া মঠ
- The Twin Temples of Sonarang, Tongibari

Religion
- Affiliation: Hinduism
- District: Munshiganj
- Deity: Shiva & Kali

Location
- Location: Sonarang, Tongibari
- Country: Bangladesh
- Interactive map of Sonarang Twin Temples

Architecture
- Founder: Rup Chandra
- Completed: 1843 AD (1st Temple); 1886 AD (2nd Temple)
- Height (max): 20.35 m

Sonarang Twin Temples are two Hindu temples located in Sonarang village of Tongibari Upazila of Munshiganj district, Bangladesh. The western temple is taller than the eastern one, about 15 m high.
