= Sharifuzzaman =

Bangladeshi footballer

Sharif
Personal information
- Full name: Sharifuzzaman
- Date of birth: 1951 (age 74–75)
- Place of birth: Munshiganj, East Bengal, Pakistan (present-day Bangladesh)
- Positions: Defensive midfielder; striker

Senior career*
Years	Team	Apps	(Gls)
1969–1971	Fire Service		
1972–1974	WAPDA		
1975–1976	Mohammedan		
1977–1979	WAPDA		

International career
1975	Bangladesh U19		
1973	Bangladesh		
- * Club domestic league appearances and goals

Sharifuzzaman (Bengali: শরিফুজ্জামান) is a retired Bangladeshi football player who played as a midfielder. He is a member of the first Bangladesh national football team.

== Personal life ==
Born in Munshiganj Sardar, East Bengal, Sharifuzzaman family had originally moved from Chandpur due to his father's job as a lawyer. Sharif is the second oldest among seven brothers and two sisters. Five of his brothers were also footballers, among them Nowsheruzzaman and Arifuzzaman played with alongside him at Mohammedan SC in 1975. While the other two Ashraf and Mamun played in the Dhaka First Division League. His brother Badiuzzaman Khosru, initially participated in the 1971 Liberation War alongside him. He studied in Dhaka University alongside his brother Nowsher, and got a degree in physics.

== Playing career ==
In 1969, Sharif made his First Division debut with Fire Service AC. In 1973, Sharif alongside his brother, Nowsheruzzaman, were selected for the first Bangladesh national football team by Sheikh Shaheb Ali. He participated in the 1973 Merdeka Cup in Malaysia. In the same year, represented both Dhaka XI and Jessore XI against the touring Dinamo Minsk. His best season came while playing with his brother Nowsher in Mohammedan SC in 1975. That year, he scored a hat-trick against BG Press in a 3–0 victory, while Nowsher finished the season as the highest goalscorer. He also participated in the 1975 AFC Youth Championship held in Kuwait. In 1977, he captained WAPDA Sports Club, before ending his career with the same club in 1979.

== Liberation War ==
During the 1971 Liberation War, Sharifuzzaman had returned to his home village in Munshiganj, where he and his friends looted the Munshiganj treasury for firearms on March 27, a day after Bangladesh's declaration of independence from Pakistan. His elder brother, Badiuzzaman Khosru, was in charge of training everyone at the Munshiganj field, although Sharif had also received firearm training at the Bangladesh Ansar.

On 28 March, he boarded the Azra launch headed for Narayanganj. There, Sharif was attacked by the Pakistani Army and falsely reported to be dead during combat. He survived after firing 27 rounds at Pakistani soldiers, with 42 bullets in his two pockets.

A month later the Pakistani army arrived in Munshiganj. Sharif was deployed in Sector 2 under Captain ATM Haider. He stayed at the Baigya camp until the war ended.

After the war I surrendered my arms to Bangabandhu (Sheikh Mujibur Rahman). But after surrendering my arms, I felt helpless.

— Sharif regarding his experience with war.

== Honours ==
Mohammedan SC

- Dhaka First Division League: 1975, 1976

== Bibliography ==
- Dulal, Mahmud (2020). খেলার মাঠে মুক্তিযুদ্ধ (transl. Liberation war in the playground) (in Bengali). Bishhoshahitto Bhobon. ISBN 978-984-8218-31-0.
- Alam, Masud (2017). ফুটবলের গল্প ফুটবলারদের গল্প (transl. The story of football the story of footballers) (in Bengali). Bishhoshahitto Bhobon. ISBN 9789849134688.
