= AKM Nowsheruzzaman =

Bangladeshi footballer

Nowsher
- Nowsher during an event

Personal information
- Full name: AKM Nowsheruzzaman
- Date of birth: 5 December 1950
- Place of birth: Munshiganj, East Bengal, Pakistan (present-day Bangladesh)
- Date of death: 21 September 2020 (aged 69)
- Place of death: Kallyanpur, Dhaka Bangladesh
- Positions: Striker; left winger

Senior career*
Years	Team	Apps	(Gls)
1967	Railway Blues	0	(0)
1968	Wari Club		
1969	Fire Service AC		
1970–1971	Victoria SC		
1972–1974	WAPDA SC		
1975–1977	Mohammedan SC		
1978–1980	Dhaka Wanderers		

International career
1971	Shadhin Bangla		
1973–1975	Bangladesh		(1)
- * Club domestic league appearances and goals

AKM Nowsheruzzaman (Bengali: এ. কে. এম. নওশেরুজ্জামান; 5 December 1950 – 21 September 2020), better known as Nowsher, was a Bangladeshi footballer who played as a striker or left-winger. In 1971, he toured India with the Shadhin Bangla football team in order to raise international awareness about the Bangladesh Liberation War. After liberation, he was also part of the first ever Bangladesh national football team.

In 1973, Nowsher scored the only goal in a friendly match against Singapore, securing Bangladesh their inaugural international football victory. While at club level, his best season was in 1975 for Mohammedan SC, when he became the First Division League top-scorer with 21 goals.

== Personal life ==
Born in Munshiganj Sardar, East Bengal, Nowsher's family had originally moved from Chandpur due to his father's job as a lawyer. Nowhser was the third oldest among seven brothers and two sisters. Five of his brothers were also footballers, among them Sharifuzzaman and Arifuzzaman played alongside him at Mohammedan SC, in 1976. While the other two Ashraf and Mamun played in the Dhaka for Dilkusha SC and Victoria SC respectively.

In 1967, Nowsher came to Dhaka and got admitted to Dhaka University studying zoology. Nowhser was married to Zafarin Zaman, with whom he had a daughter named Simin Noor Zaman and a son named Moinuzzaman.

== Club career ==
Nowsher first came to Dhaka in 1967, where he trialed for the East Pakistan Junior Team after being recommended by Azad Boys Club's Mohamed Mustaq, who had witnessed Nowsher's game in Munshiganj. During the trials he impressed Sheikh Shaheb Ali and was invited to the youth team's camp. While training with the youth team, Nowsher was accepted into Dhaka University, thus, he decided to stay in Dhaka. He joined Railway Blues Club in the same year, however, he did not make any appearances. In 1968, he would make his First Division League debut, scoring twice for Wari Club in a 3–1 victory over East End Club.

In 1969, he moved to Fire Service AC, after the club agreed to pay all his university expenses. The following year, he joined Victoria SC, and guided the team to a fourth-place finish, however, his club career was halted due to the Bangladesh Liberation War, in 1971. When the First Division resumed in 1972, Nowsher joined WAPDA SC, and scored 16 goals in 7 games during the unfinished league season. At WAPDA Scottish coach Sandy converted Nowhser, who originally played as a left-winger to a striker and in 1973 he attracted interest from Mohammedan SC. After deciding to remain with WAPDA, Nowsher linked up with Enayetur Rahman and helped the club finish the first phase of the 1974 league season top of the table, however, during the second phase the club's form fell due to internal issues.

In 1975, Nowsher joined Mohammedan SC, a club which he supported as a child. In his debut season, he became top scorer with 21 goals, as The Black and Whites won the First Division for the first time since Bangladesh's independence. That season he scored a bicycle kick against his former club Victoria SC and also found the net in a famous 4–0 victory over Abahani Krira Chakra in the Dhaka Derby. The other scorers in the game were, Md Moin, Hafizuddin Ahmed and Wazed Gazi, while defender Shamsul Alam Manju made headlines for taunting Abahani team leader, Sheikh Kamal. In 1976, Nowsher again became league champion, however he broke his leg that year and lost his place in the team. In 1978, he joined Dhaka Wanderers and retired while playing for them in 1980.

== International career ==
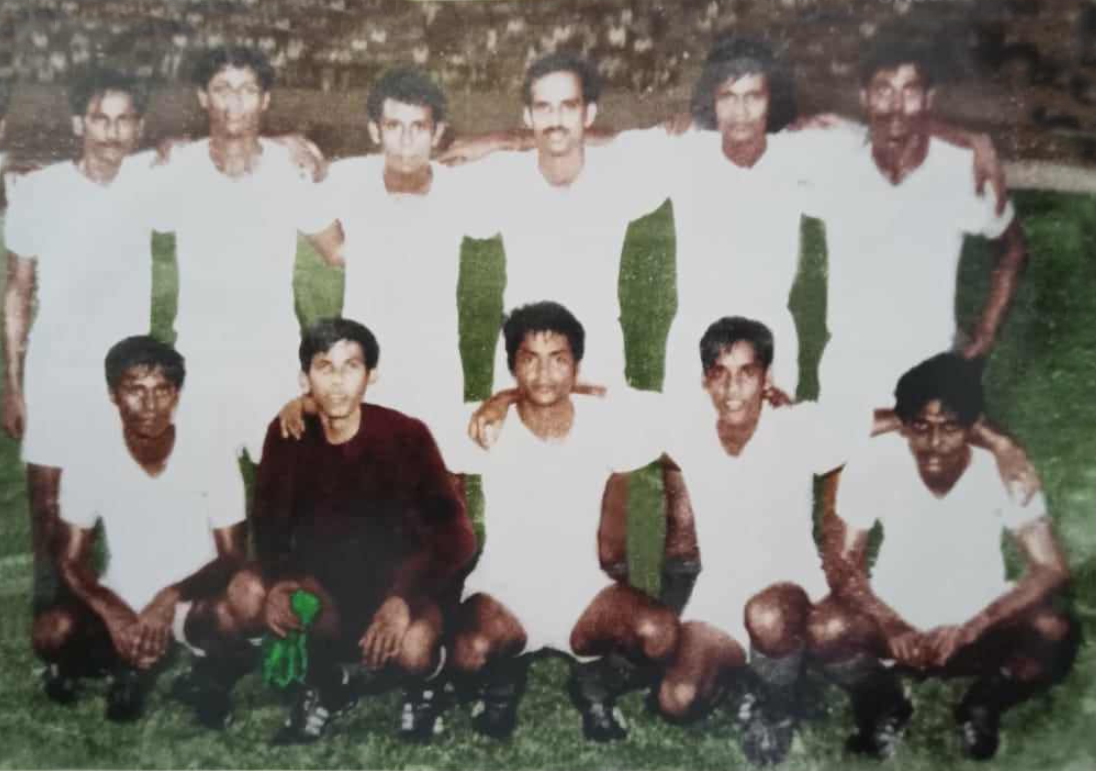
Nowsher (standing third from the left) with the national team at the 1973 Merdeka Cup in Malaysia.

In 1971, during the Bangladesh Liberation War, Nowsher travelled to Agartala, India, where he met up with Mohammedan teammate Mohamed Kaikobad and his ex-colleague at WAPDA, Enayetur Rahman Khan. With Enaytur and Kaikobad, Nowsher played for Birendra Club in the Agartala League, and became champions. Later, Protap Shankar Hazra the vice-captain of the Shadhin Bangla football team, took the players to Kolkata to join the rest of the team. During a game against Bombay XI, Nowsher scored an Olympico goal in a 3–1 victory. After returning to the newly liberated country, Nowsher played for Bangladesh XI in the first football match held in Bangladesh, coming on as a substitute as his team lost 2–0 to Presidents XI.

On 13 May 1972, Nowsher played for Dhaka XI (unofficial national team), during their 1–0 win over Mohun Bagan AC, when the Indian club came to Bangladesh as the first international team. In 1972, Nowsher went to Guwahati with the Dhaka XI to play the Bordoloi Trophy. Nowsher was the team's top-scorer, as they finished runner-up losing to East Bengal Club in the final. One of his goals during the tournament came in a 2–0 over George Telegraph.

In 1973, Sheikh Shaheb Ali called up eight players from W.A.P.D.A including Nowhser and his brother Sharifuzzaman, to the first Bangladesh national football team, which took part in Malaysia's Merdeka Tournament. After Bangladesh ended the tournament without a single win, the Bangladesh Football Federation decided to hold a friendly game with Singapore on their way back from Malaysia. On 13 August 1973, Nowsher scored the only goal against Singapore from a Monwar Hossain Nannu cross, as Bangladesh claimed their first ever win in international football. Nowsher's only other tournament with Bangladesh was the 1975 edition of the Merdeka Cup, as he was not called up to the team again after breaking his leg in 1976.

=== International goals ===
#	Date	Venue	Opponent	Score	Result	Competition	ref.
1.	13 August 1973	National Stadium, Singapore	Singapore	1–0	1–0	Friendly	

== Honours ==
Mohammedan SC

- Dhaka First Division League: 1975, 1976

=== Awards and accolades ===
- Dhaka University Blue Award

=== Individual ===
- Dhaka First Division League top scorer: 1975

== Cricket career ==
AKM Nowsheruzzaman
Cricket information
- Batting: Right-handed
- Bowling: Right-arm off break
- Role: Opening batter

Domestic team information
- Years: Team
- 1974: Khulna Town Club
- 1975–1978: Mohammedan SC
- 1978–1980: Dhaka Wanderers
- 1980–1983: Victoria SC
- 1983–1990: Kala Bagan Krira Chakra
- Source: Dhaka Tribune

During the football off season, Nowhser would play cricket. He joined Town Club in 1974 and was a crucial player for the Khulna-based team. As an all-rounder, he started playing cricket for Mohammedan SC the same year he won the football league with the club. The following year, they won the 1976 Independence Cup trophy with the Black & Whites. He played as an opening batsman with Raqibul Hasan in Mohammedan. Nowsher came out as an opener against Biman and batted the entire innings remaining Not out with 69 runs. He went onto play for Dhaka Wanderers, after he joined the club in 1978 and following his retirement from playing football in 1980, he kept on playing cricket with Victoria SC. In 1983, he joined Kala Bagan Krira Chakra, where he was captain for five years, before retiring from cricket in 1990. After independence, Nowsher is one of a few players to be part of both Mohammedan SC's first Dhaka First Division Football League (1976) and Dhaka Premier Division Cricket League (1978) winning teams.

== Cricket honours ==
Mohammedan SC

- Dhaka Premier Division Cricket League: 1978
- Independence Cup: 1976

== Death ==
On 21 November 2020, Nowsher died at the age of 70 after being infected by COVID-19.

== Bibliography ==
- Dulal, Mahmud (2020). খেলার মাঠে মুক্তিযুদ্ধ (transl. Liberation war in the playground) (in Bengali). Bishhoshahitto Bhobon. ISBN 978-984-8218-31-0.
- Alam, Masud (2017). ফুটবলের গল্প ফুটবলারদের গল্প (transl. The story of football the story of footballers) (in Bengali). Bishhoshahitto Bhobon. ISBN 9789849134688.
- Tariq, T Islam (2025). মোহামেডান-আবাহনী ময়দানি লড়াই (transl. Mohammedan-Abahani battle field) (in Bengali). Annesha Prokashon. ISBN 978-984-99475-1-6.
