= Middle Courtgaon =

Coordinates: 23.549°N 90.534°E

Middle Courtgaon or Madhya Courtgaon is one of the main villages that make up Munshiganj Paurashava, the headquarters of Munshiganj Sadar Upazila, Bangladesh.
