= Bikrampur Vihara =

Ancient Buddhist vihara in Bangladesh

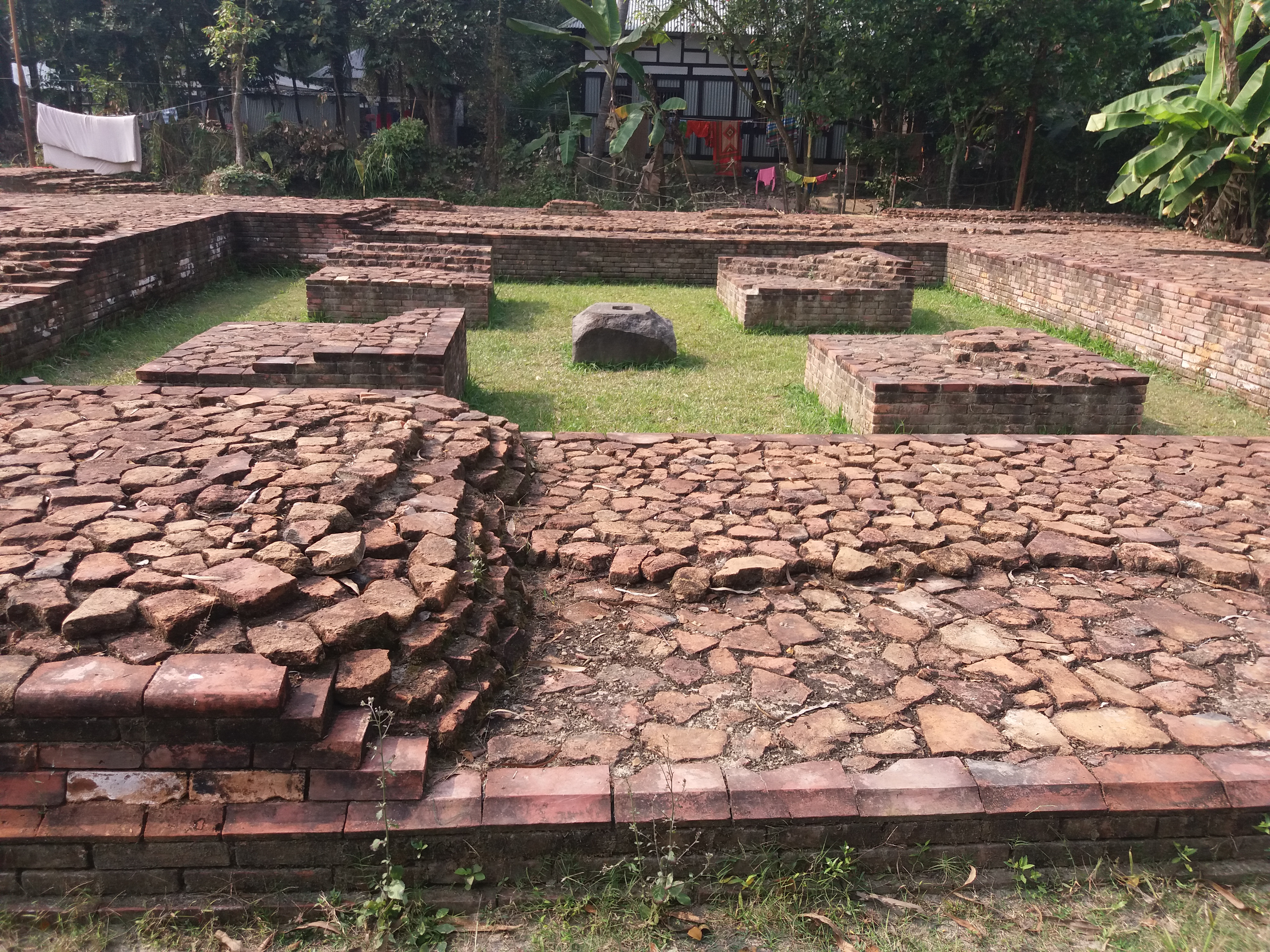
Bikrampur Vihara

Bikrampur Vihara is an ancient Buddhist vihara at Raghurampur village, Bikrampur, Munshiganj District, Dhaka Division in Bangladesh.

== Location ==
The monastery is located at Raghurampur village under Rampal Union of Sadar Upazila of Munshiganj District .

== History ==
The discovery was announced on 23 March 2013, after four years of excavation conducted jointly by Agrasar Bikrampur Foundation, a local sociocultural organisation, and the Archaeology Department of Jahangirnagar University. The excavation was financed by Bangladesh's Ministry of Cultural Affairs.

On 23 March 2013, Director of the Archaeological Excavation and Research in Bikrampur region, declared the discovery of this 1000-year-old Buddhist Vihara. Over 100 precious idols and sculptures have been found till March 2013.

This is one of the thirty viharas built by Emperor Dharmapala during his regime c. 820 as the second emperor of the Pala Empire. It is connected to Atiśa, an important figure in Tibetan Buddhism. During the time of Atiśa, this region was the center of Buddhist education and some 8,000 students and professors came to study at Bikrampur from as far as China, Tibet, Nepal and Thailand.

== Central temple ==
Five rooms of the monks sized 3.5 by 3.5 metres (11 ft × 11 ft) have been excavated so far. The exact size of the monastery, however, could not be assumed yet.

== See also ==
- Nateshwar
- Somapura Mahavihara
