= Kallyanpur =

Neighbourhood in Dhaka, Bangladesh

Coordinates: 23.781°N 90.359°E

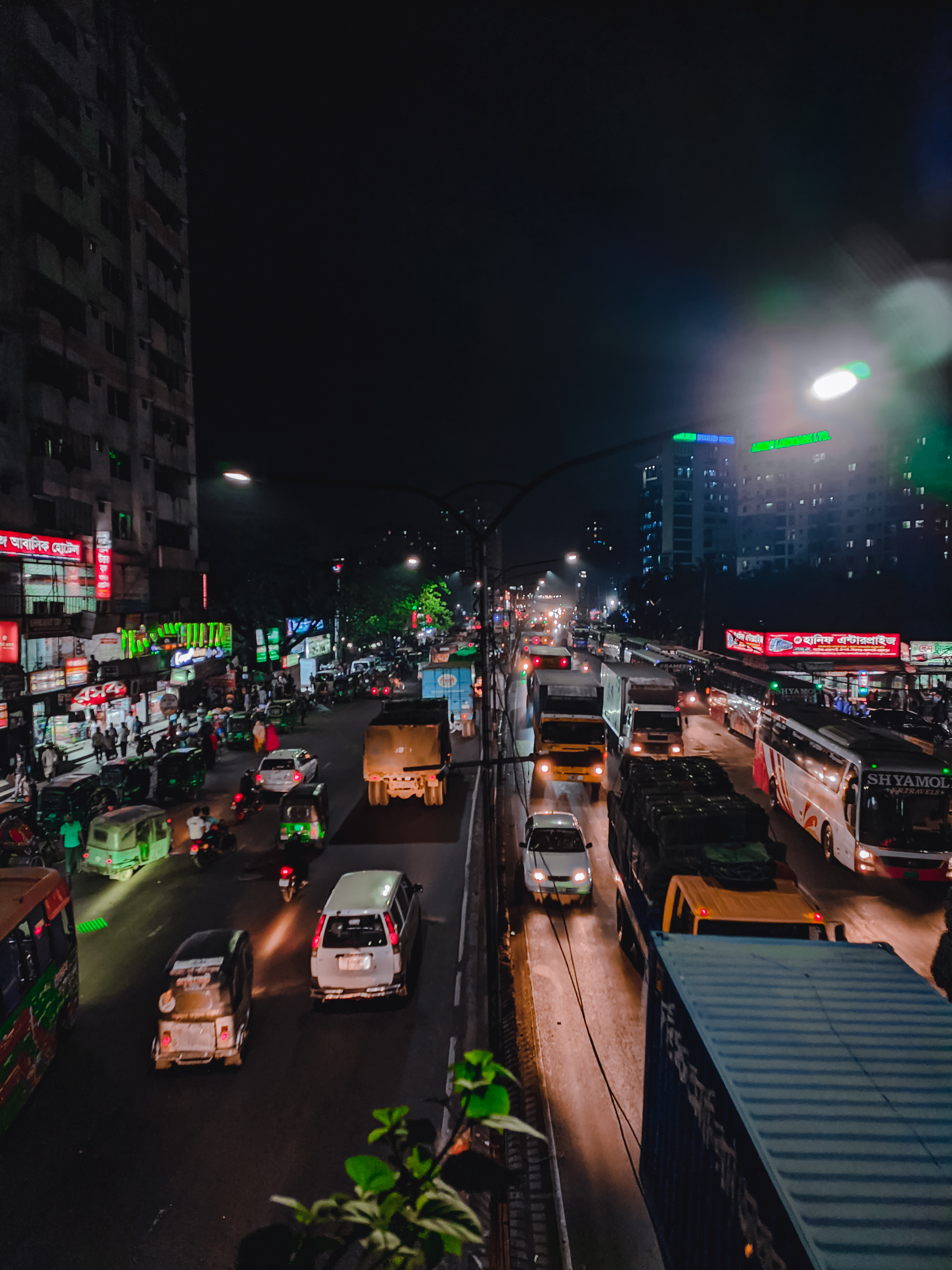
A street in Kalyanpur, Dhaka, in night view.

Kallyanpur or Kalyanpur (Bengali: কল্যাণপুর) is a neighbourhood in Dhaka, Bangladesh. It is part of the Dhaka North City Corporation. This place is popular for inter-district bus counters, with many bus stands and ticket counters located here.
