= Masuda Khatun =

Masuda Khatun (Bengali: মাসুদা খাতুন; 1885–1926) was a pioneering Bengali feminist and secularist. Her pen name was Mrs M Rahman.

== Early life ==
Khatun was born into a landed noble family in 1885. Her father was a lawyer based in Hooghly district, Bengal Presidency, British Raj. She was married when she was 11. Her husband, Mahmudur Rahman, was a registrar based in Kolkata. Her contemporary feminist and frequent pen pal was Begum Rokeya Sakhawat Hossain.

== Career ==
Khatun wrote about women's rights and feminism. She criticised the conservative Muslims. She used wit and irony in her writings to criticise Islamists. Her work was appreciated by progressive Muslims. She was a regular contributor to Dhumketu, the magazine published by Kazi Nazrul Islam. The future National Poet of Bangladesh, Kazi Nazrul Islam dedicated his poem Bisher Banxi to her. He was an admirer of her work and called her Ma. She was a firm secularist who called for unity between Muslims and Hindus. She used to visit the cinemas and Kirtan sessions without wearing a burkha, which was contrary to how Muslim women expected to wear Burkhas in public. She helped create a Prostitution rehabilitation center. She wrote Purdah versus Deprivation which criticised the way women have been sidelined in Islam through the veil.

== Death ==
Khatun died in 1926. After her death Kazi Nazrul Islam dedicated a book to her in which he gave her the title Agni Nagini (Fire Serpent). Her husband published her collected works called Chanachur in 1927.
