= Baba Adam's Mosque =

Mosque in Munshiganj, Bangladesh

- বাবা আদম মসজিদ
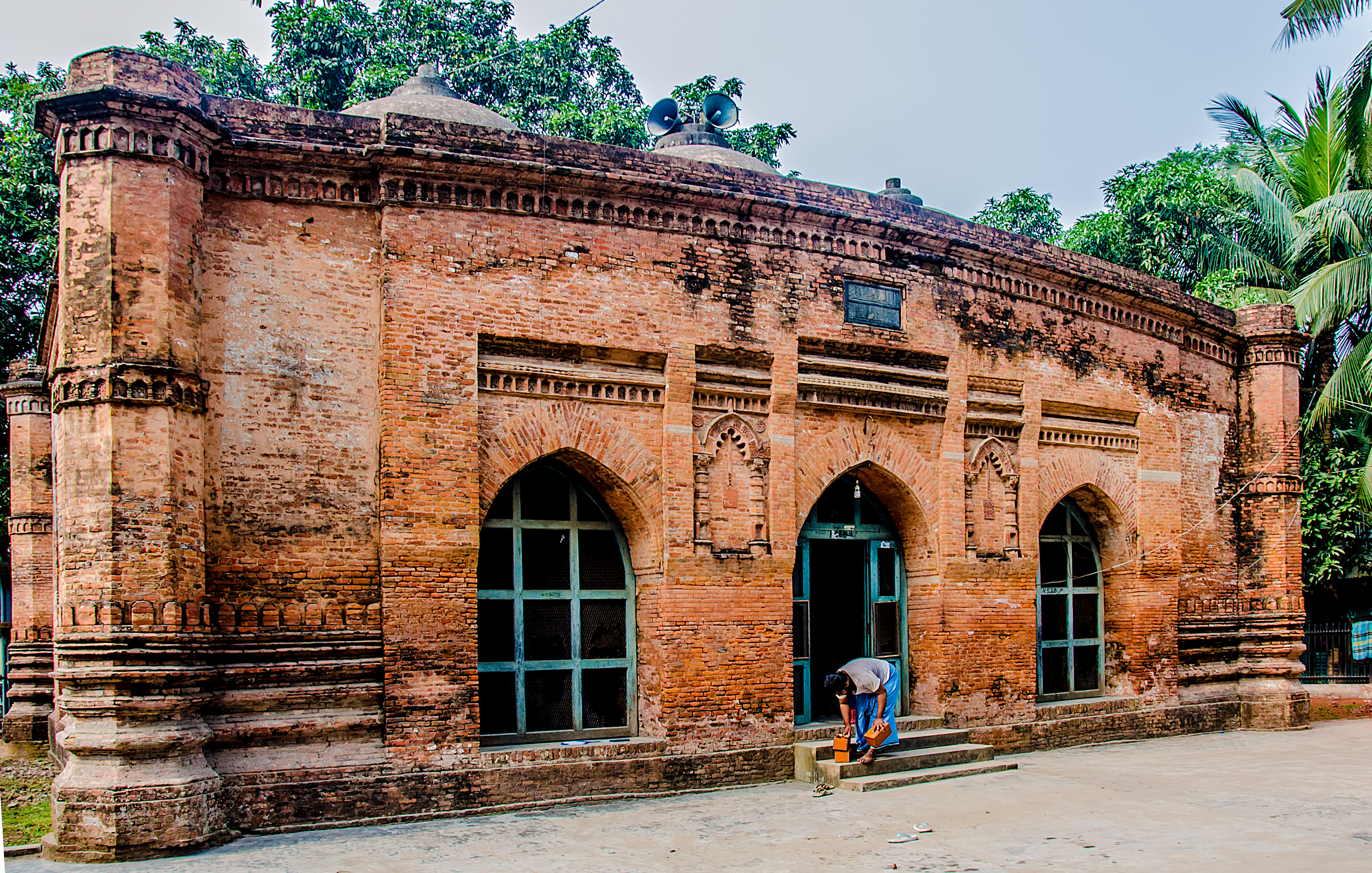

- Location within Bangladesh

Religion
- Affiliation: Sunni Islam

Location
- Location: Munshiganj District, Bangladesh
- Interactive map of Baba Adam's Mosque
- Coordinates: 23.556431°N 90.496350°E

Architecture
- Architect: Malik al-Muazzam Malik Kafur
- Type: Mosque
- Style: Islamic architecture
- Funded by: Jalaluddin Fateh Shah
- Established: 1483; 543 years ago

Specifications
- Length: 14.30 m (46.9 ft)
- Width: 11.45 m (37.6 ft)
- Interior area: 69.8625 m^{2} (751.994 ft^{2})
- Dome: 6

Website
- www.munshigonj.com/heritage/babaadam.htm

Baba Adam's Mosque (Bengali: বাবা আদম মসজিদ, Arabic: مسجد بابا آدم) is a mosque situated in the village of Qadi Qasbah under Rampal Union of Bangladesh's Munshiganj District. It was constructed in 1483 A.D by Malik Kafur to function as a Jami mosque during the reign of Jalaluddin Fateh Shah. The tomb of Baba Adam Shahid, a 15th-century Muslim preacher, lies near the edifice.

== History ==
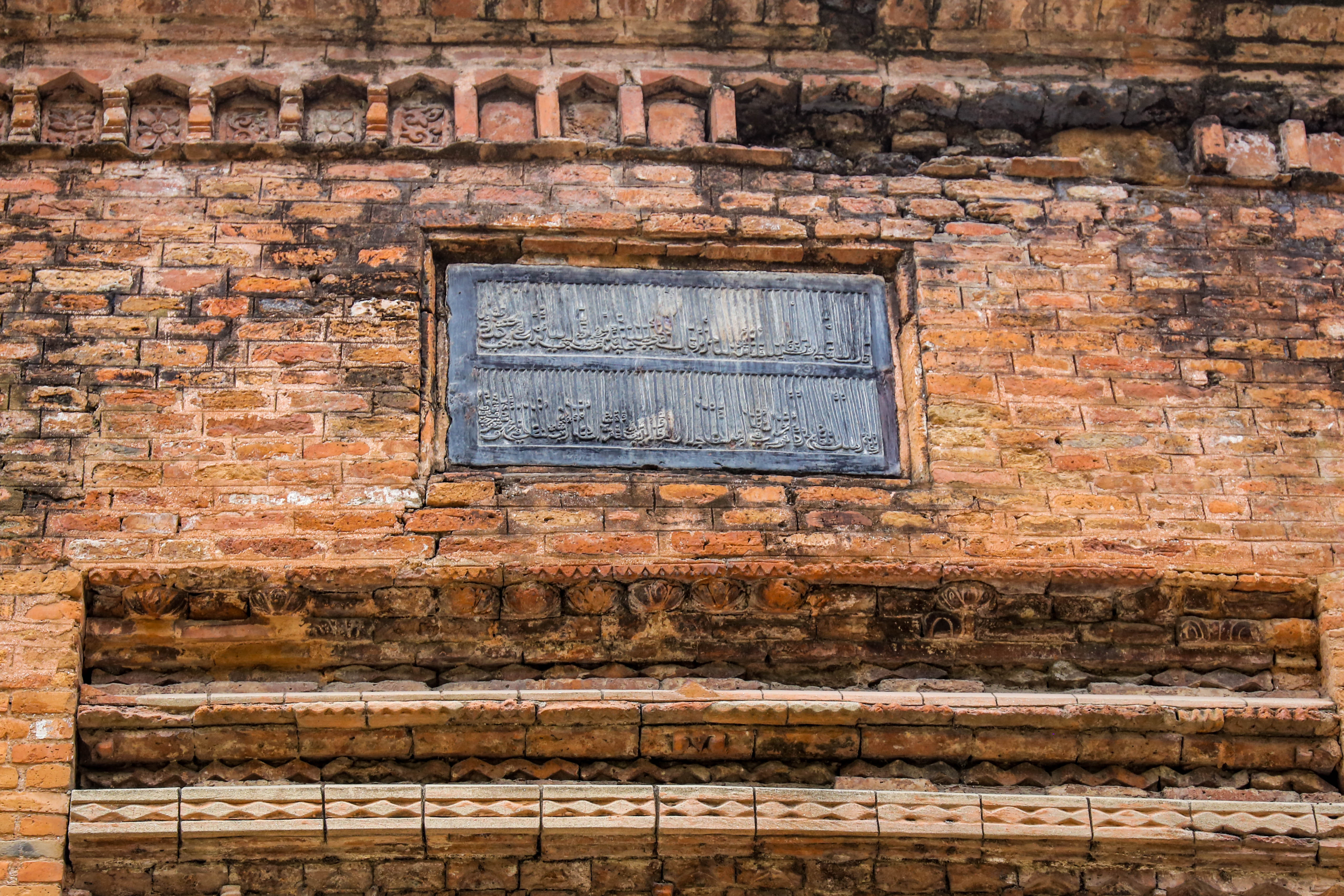
Inscription mentioning the history

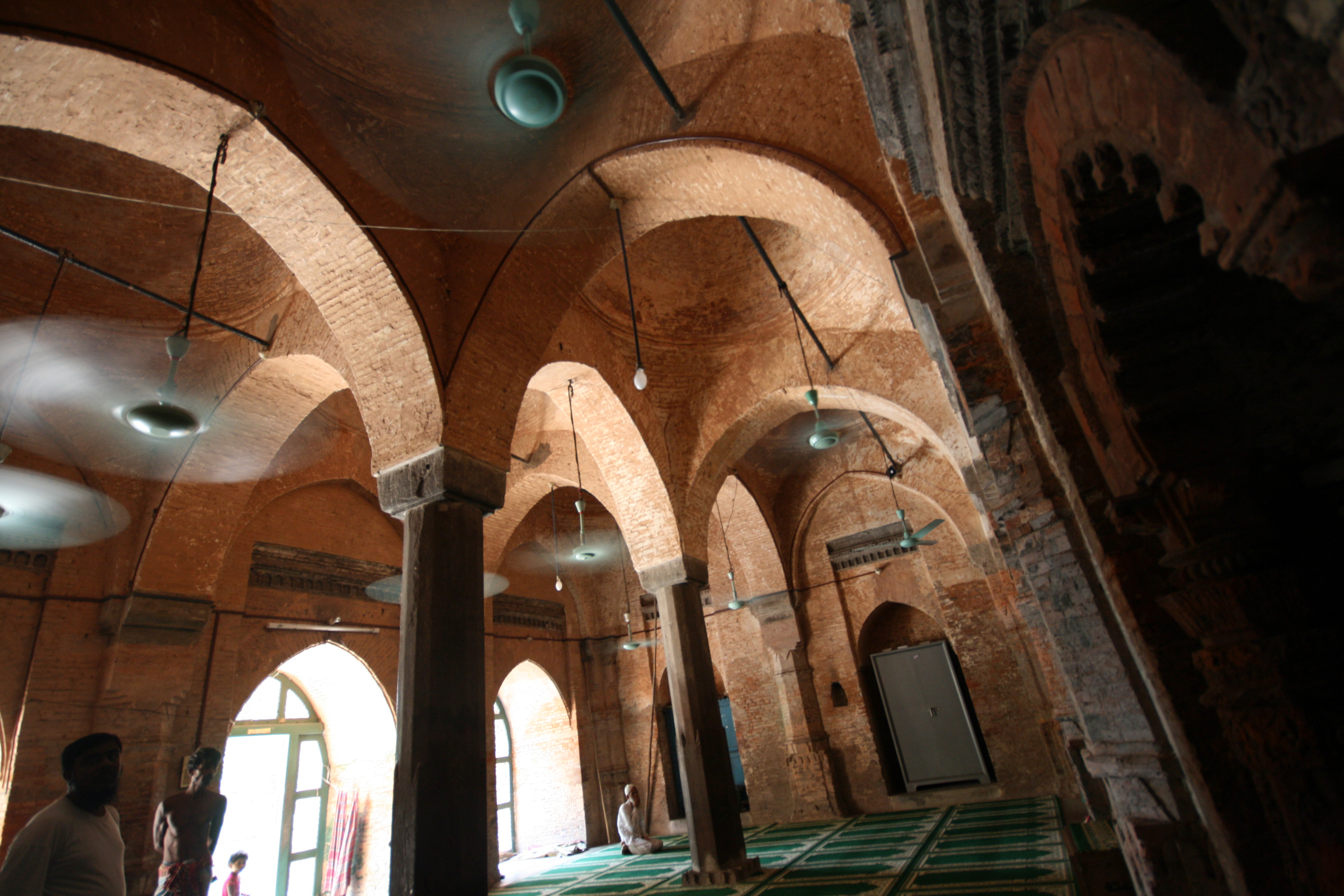
Interior

According to the Arabic calligraphy inscription fixed aloft the central doorway in the east, the mosque was built in Rajab 888 A.H (August/September 1483 AD) during the reign of the Sultan of Bengal Jalaluddin Fateh Shah. It was constructed by Malik al-Muʿazzam Malik Kafur, one of the Sultan's officers. According to historian Ahmad Hasan Dani, Kafur was of Abyssinian origin. Now a protected monument under the Department of Archaeology, the mosque has been renovated and remains in a good state of preservation.

== Architecture ==
Split into two aisles and three bays, the rear of the wall on the west is displayed in three steps of which the middle part contains a multi-cusped ornamental arch-panel. The brick building is roofed over by six identical domes divided into two rows. Two freestanding slender octagonal-based black basalt pillars have chain and bell motifs. Stone pillars hold the pointed two-centred arches of the six domes.

All the entrances and mihrabs are recessed within rectangular frames. The south and north walls contain rectangular niches. The multi-domed mosque does not have a minaret. On both sides of the central doorway there are two multi-cusped rectangular panels. The arches are supported on faceted small pillars and decorated with a terracotta floral design. This type of facade decoration is also found in Shahzadpur Mosque (Sirajganj).

== Gallery ==
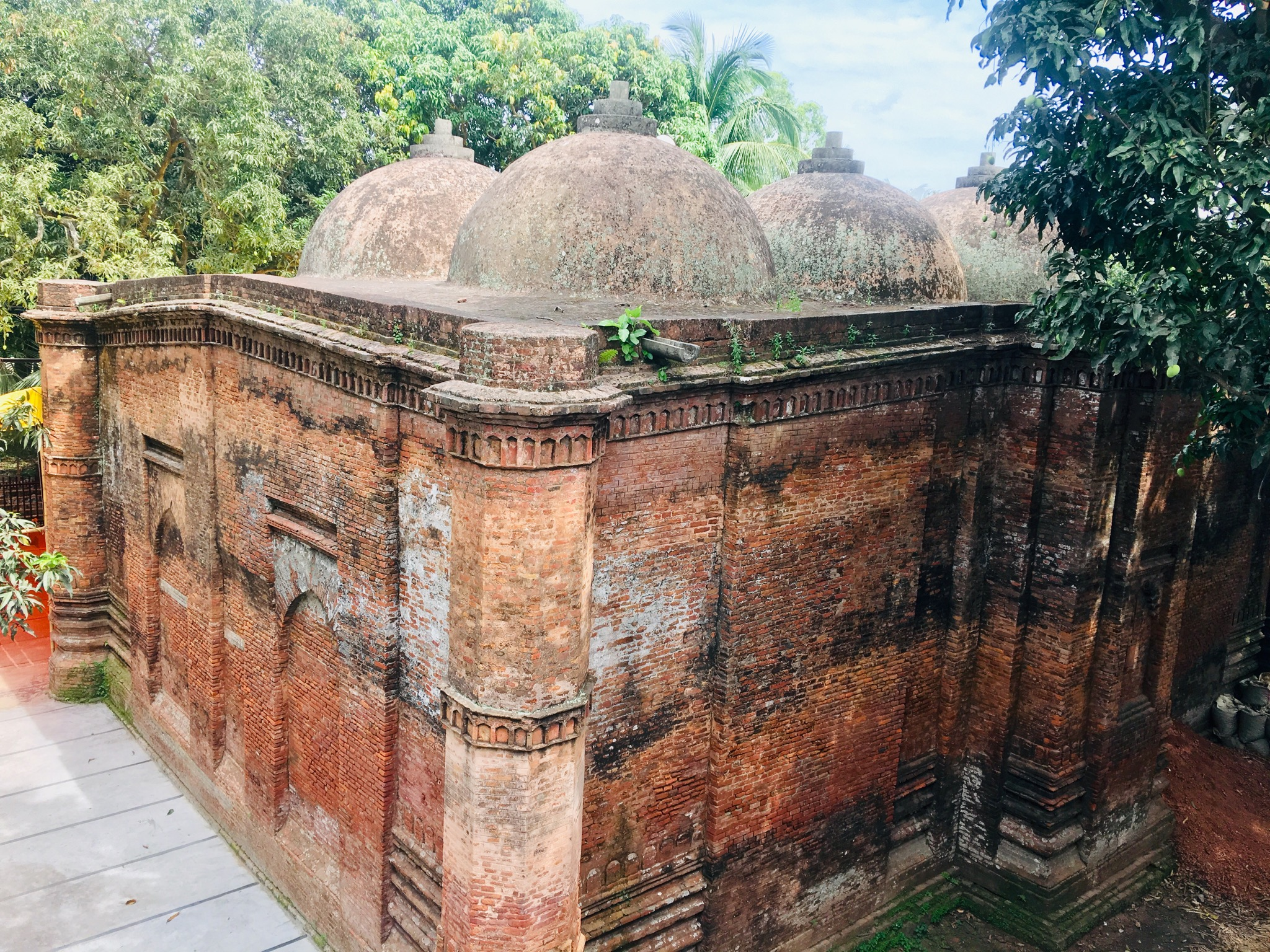
Alternate view

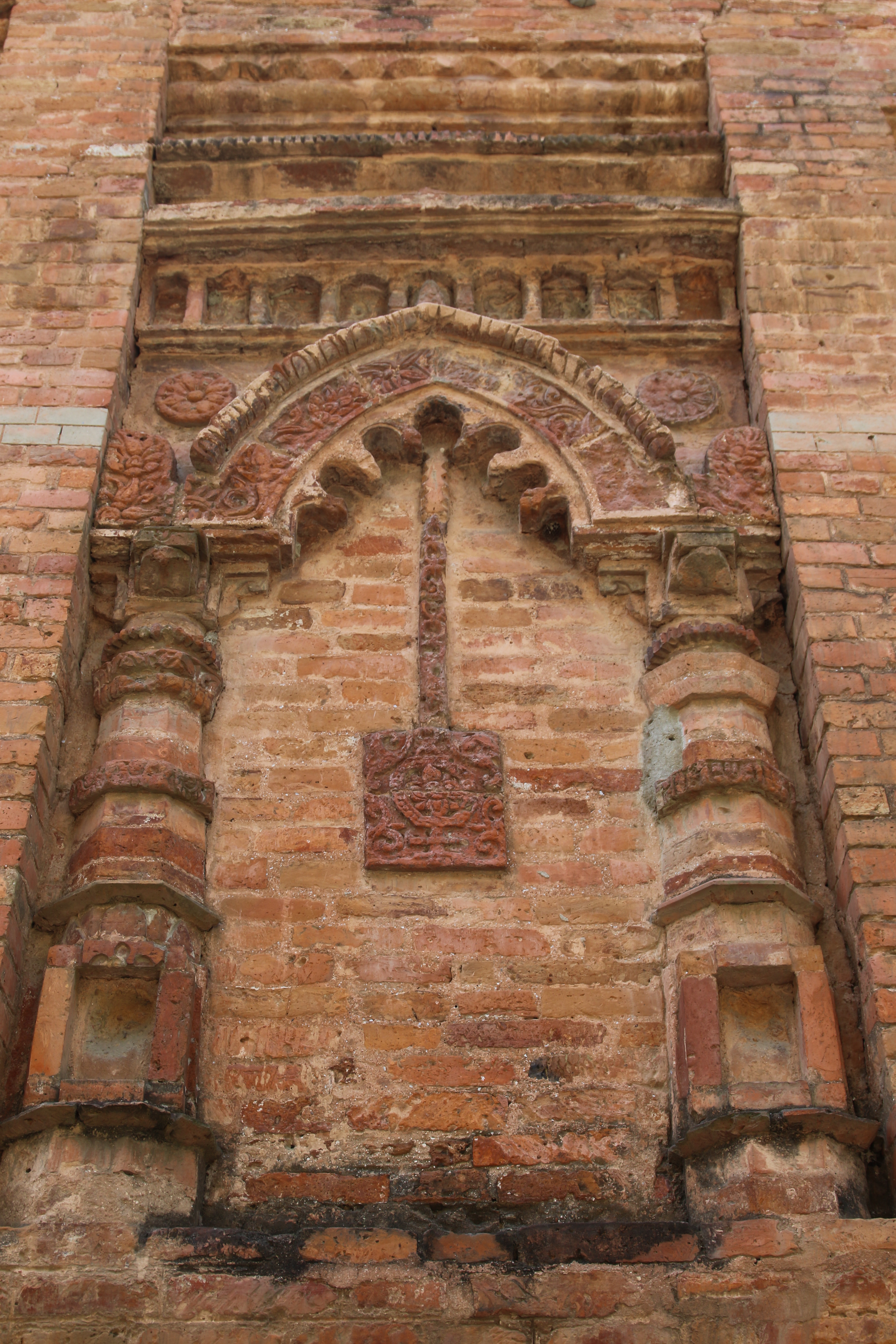
Design

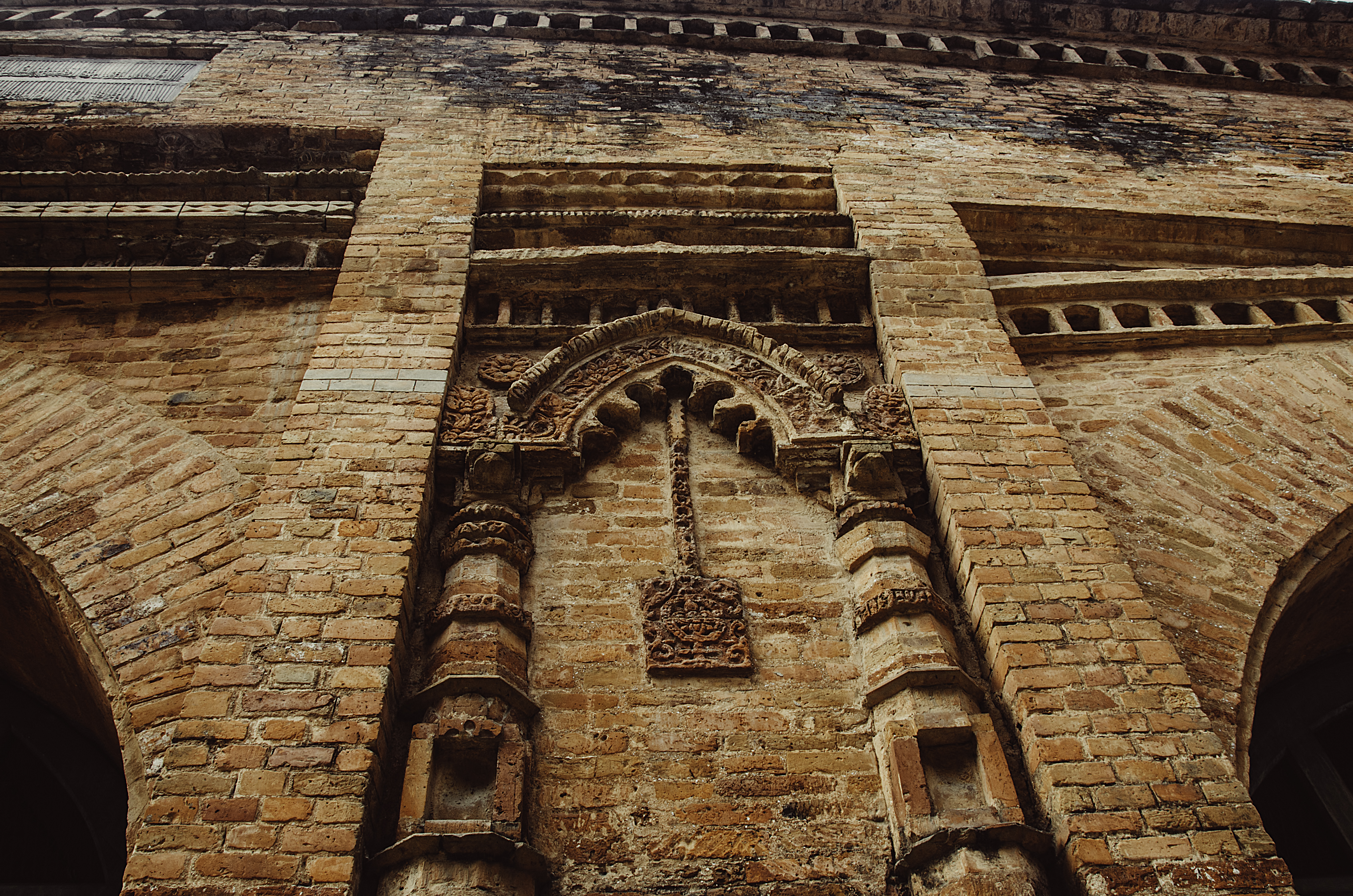
Motif

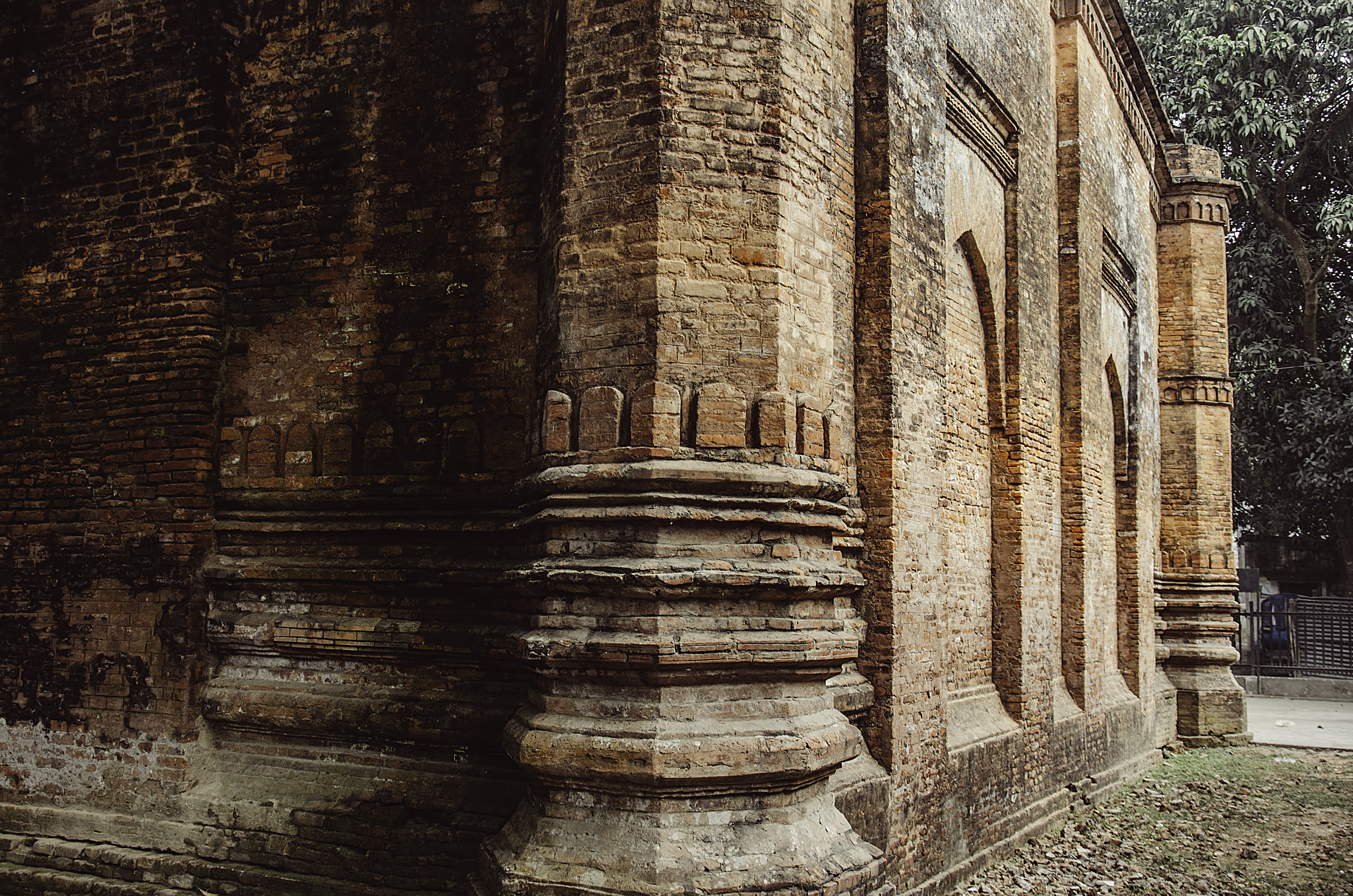
Corner

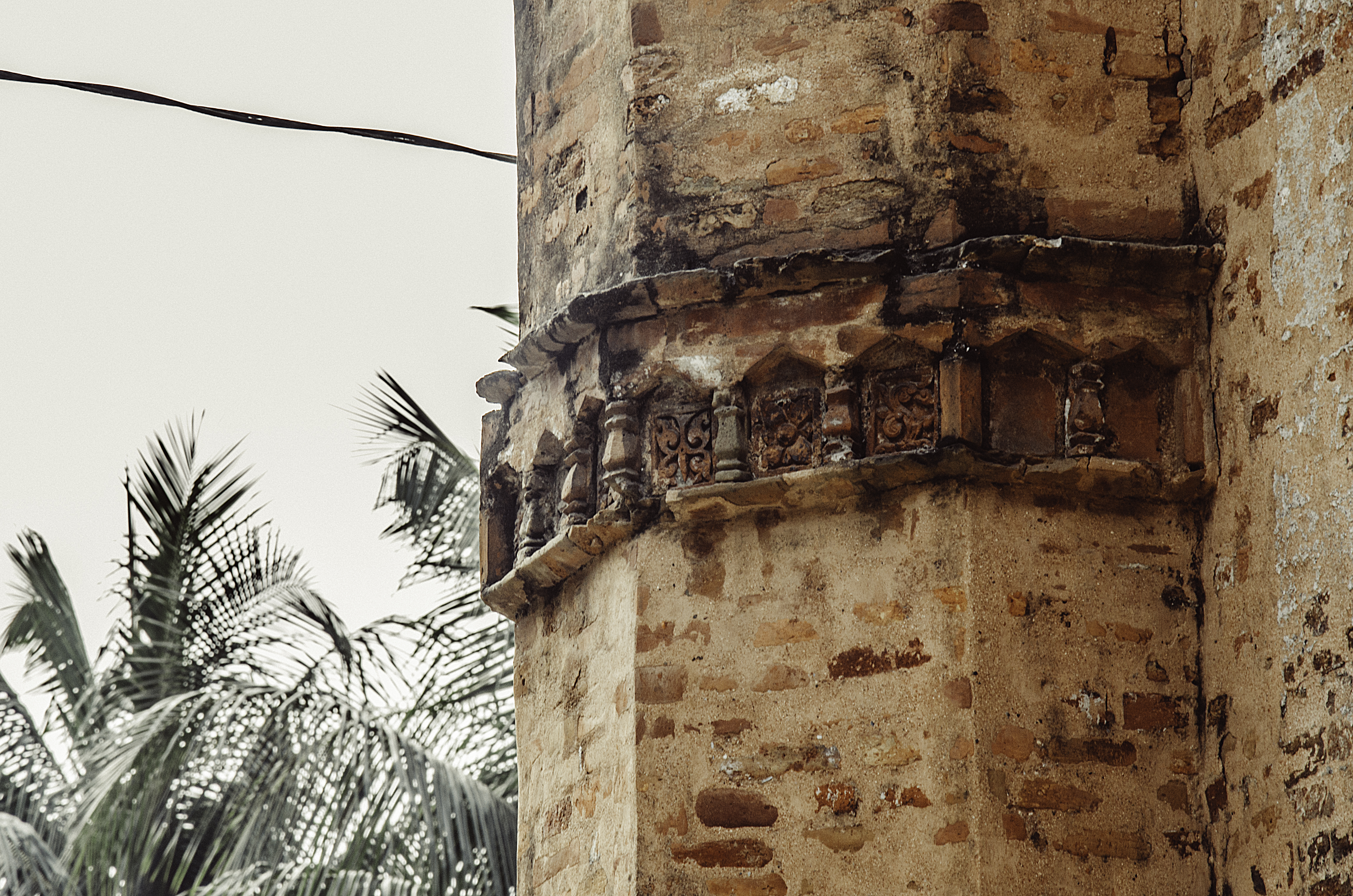
Pillar

== See also ==
- Islam in Bangladesh
- List of mosques in Bangladesh
- Bengal Sultanate
