= Munshiganj District =

Munshiganj District মুন্সীগঞ্জ জেলা
- District of Bangladesh
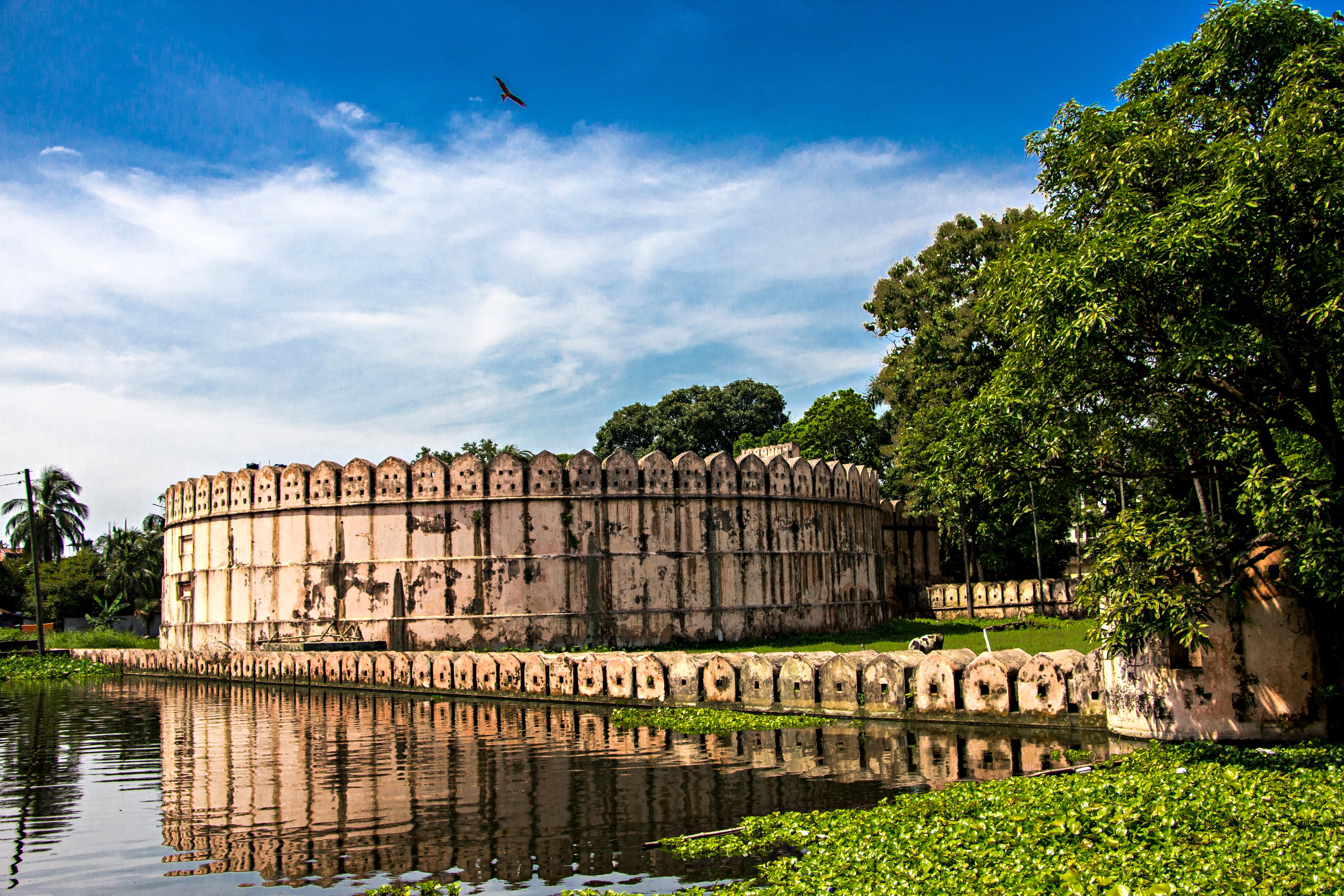
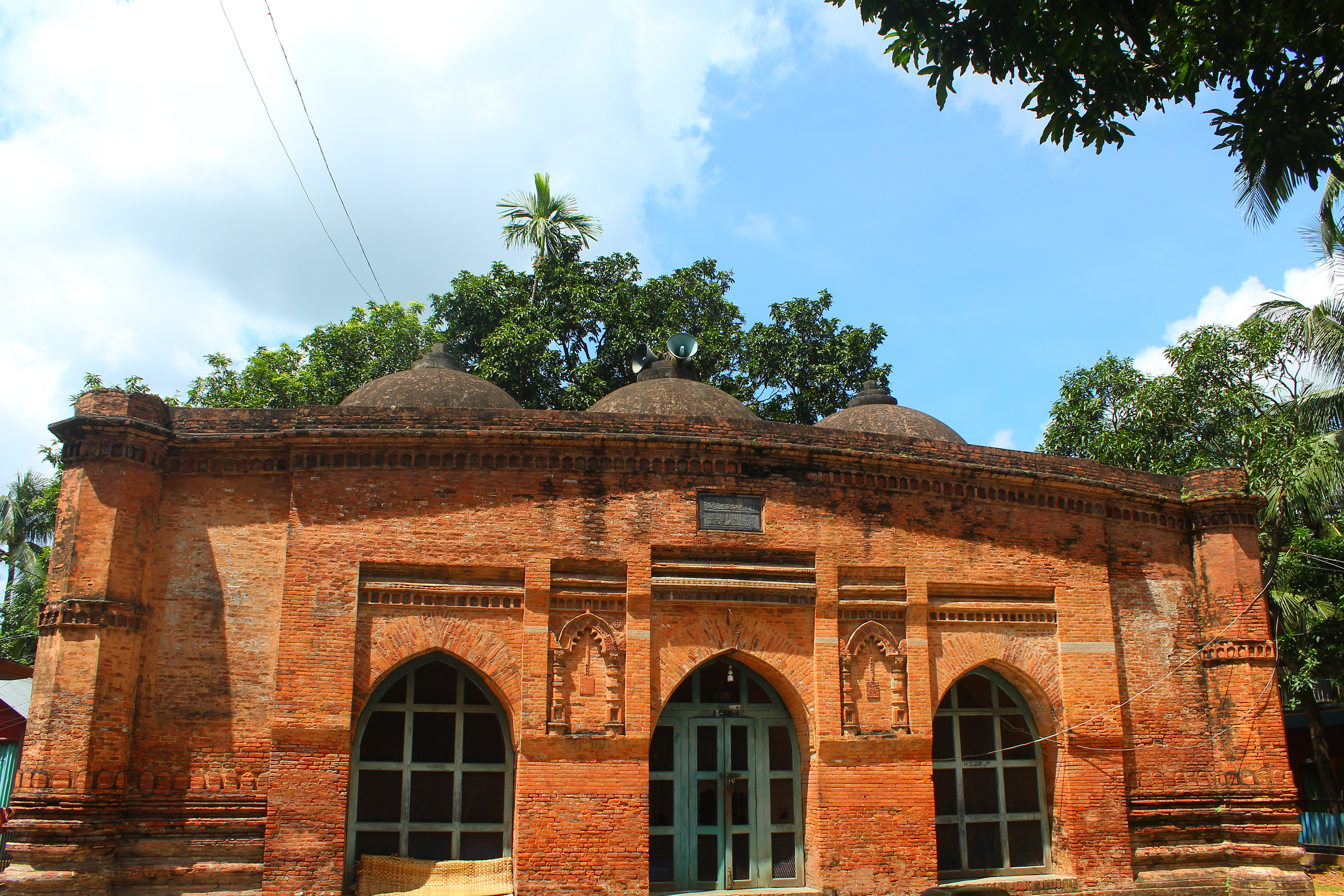
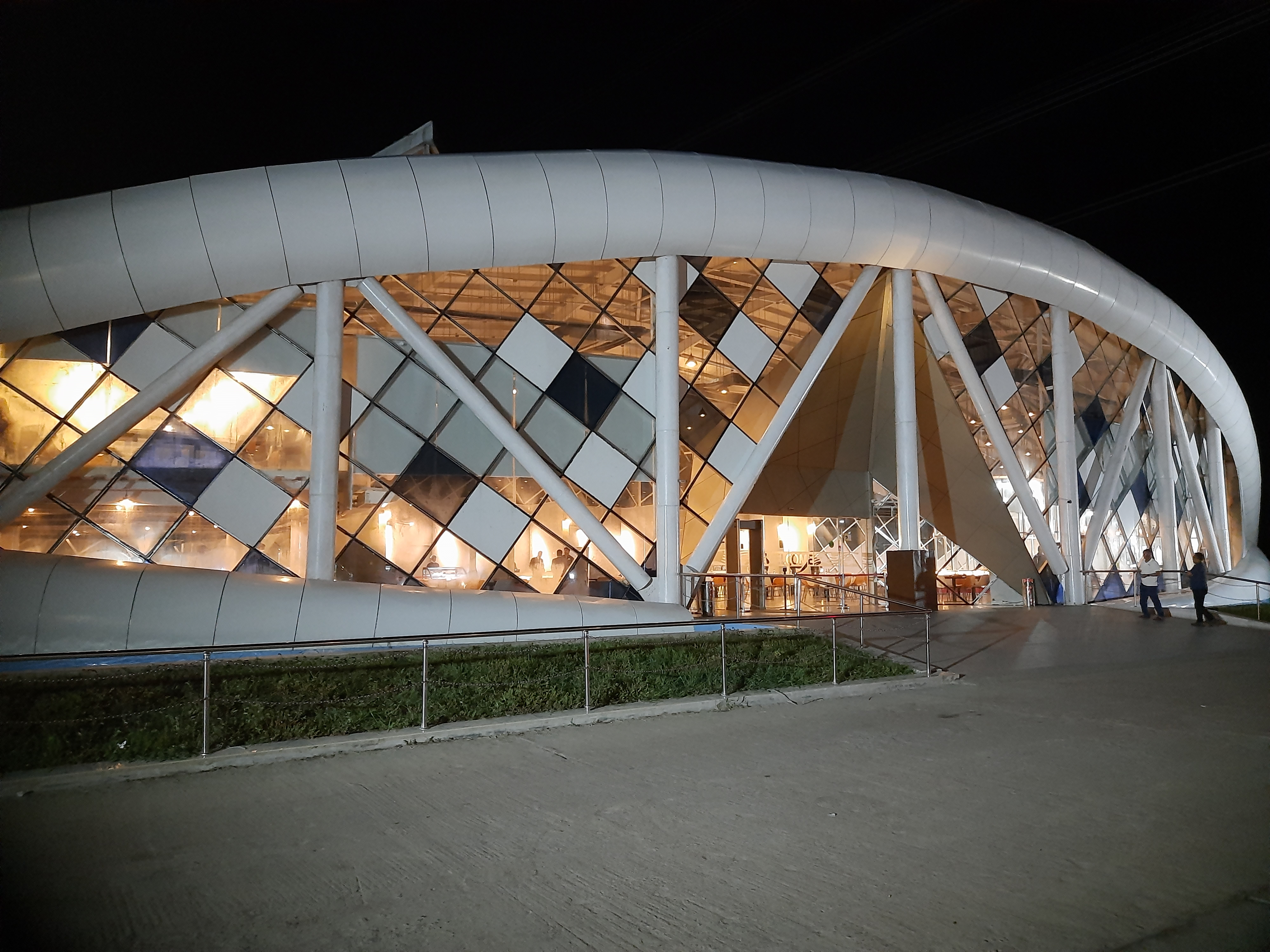
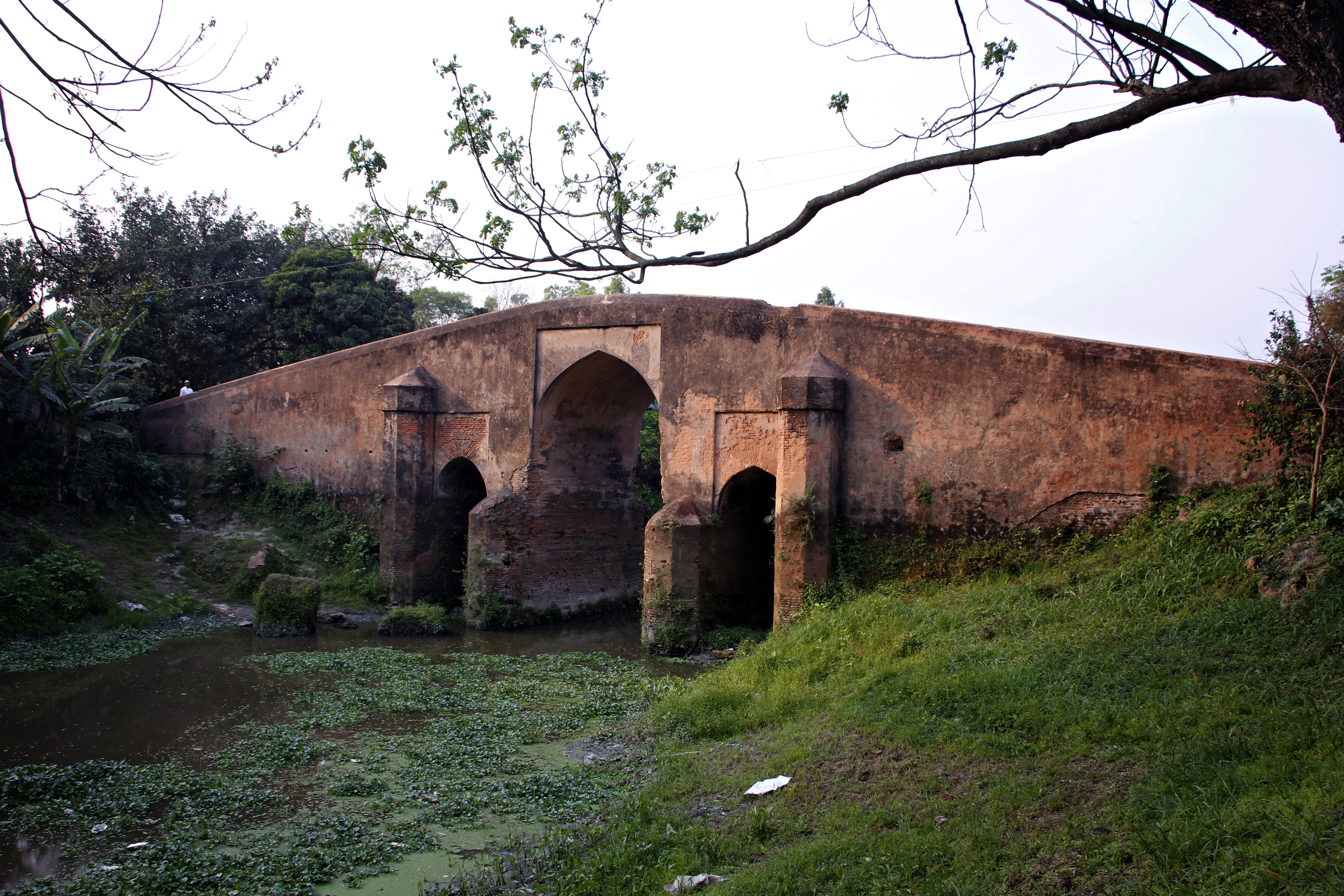
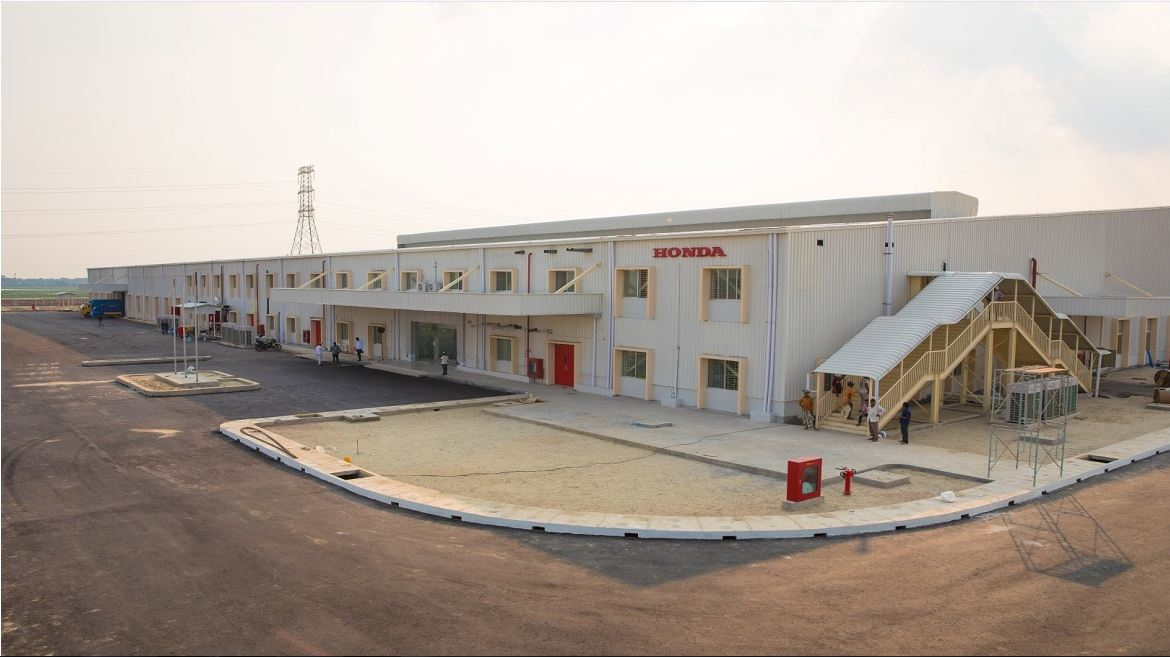
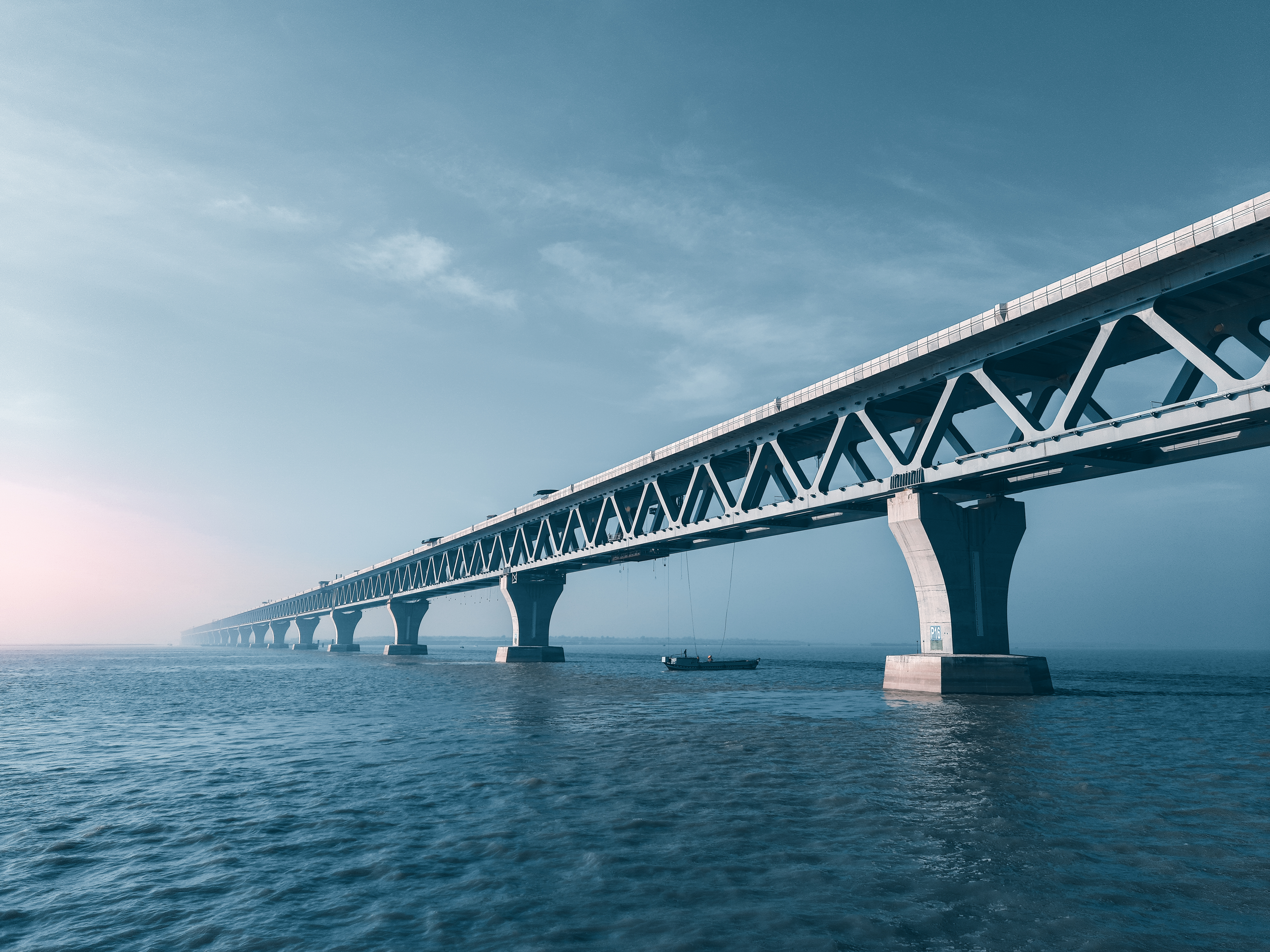
- Clockwise from top-left: Idrakpur Fort, Project Hilsha, Honda Manufacturing Plant, Padma Bridge, Mirkadim Bridge and Baba Adam's Mosque
- Nickname: Bikrampur
- Location of Munshiganj District in Bangladesh
- Expandable map of Munshiganj District
- Coordinates: 23.46°N 90.54°E
- Country: Bangladesh
- Division: Dhaka
- Established: Medieval India
- Headquarters: Munshiganj

Government
  - Deputy Commissioner: Fatema Tul Zannat

Area
  - Total: 954.96 km^{2} (368.71 sq mi)

Population (2022)
  - Total: 1,625,416
  - Density: 1,702.1/km^{2} (4,408.4/sq mi)
- Demonym(s): Munshiganji, Bikrompuira, Bikrampuri, Dhakaiya
- Time zone: UTC+06:00 (BST)
- Postal code: 1500
- Area code: 0691
- ISO 3166 code: BD-35
- HDI (2018): 0.649 medium · 3rd of 21

Munshiganj District (Bengali: মুন্সীগঞ্জ জেলা) is a district of Dhaka Division. It is located in central Bangladesh. This region is also historically known as Bikrampur.

== Geography ==
It is a part of Dhaka Division and borders Dhaka District and Narayanganj District in the north, Madaripur District and Shariatpur District in the south, Chandpur District and Comilla District in the east and Dhaka District and Faridpur District in the west.

Total land area is 235,974 acres (954 km^{2}), out of which 138472 acres (560 km^{2}) are cultivable and 5609 acres (23 km^{2}) are fallow land. It has no forest area. 40,277 acres (163 km^{2}) of land is irrigated while 26,242 acres (106 km^{2}) of land is under river. It has 14 rivers of 155 km passing through.

=== Water bodies ===
Main rivers include the Padma River, Meghna River, Dhaleswari River and the Ichamati River.

== Boating ==
Boating is one of the traditions of the people in Munshiganj District. A traditional Nouka Baich race is held in the Dhaleshwari River which thousands of people come to see. The boat race was held in a 3 km area from the Mirkadim Municipality to Munshiganj launch harbor. Boats with 60 oarsmen, 50 oarsmen and 25 oarsmen participate in the competition every year

== Administration ==
Munshiganj District upazila geocode map

It consists of 6 upazilas, 67 union parishads, 603 wards, 662 mouzas, 906 villages, 73 mahallas and 2 municipalities.

The district consists of 6 upazilas:

1. Lohajang Upazila
2. Sreenagar Upazila
3. Munshiganj Sadar Upazila
4. Sirajdikhan Upazila
5. Tongibari Upazila
6. Gazaria Upazila

== Demographics ==
Historical population
Year	Pop.	±% p.a.
1974	908,285	—
1981	1,065,573	+2.31%
1991	1,188,387	+1.10%
2001	1,293,972	+0.85%
2011	1,445,660	+1.11%
2022	1,625,416	+1.07%

According to the 2022 Census of Bangladesh, Munshiganj District had 399,631 households and a population of 1,625,416 with an average 3.98 people per household. Among the population, 303,978 (18.70%) inhabitants were under 10 years of age. The population density was 1,702 people per km^{2}. Munshiganj District had a literacy rate (age 7 and over) of 77.90%, compared to the national average of 74.80%, and a sex ratio of 1,061 females per 1,000 males. Approximately, 18.09% of the population lived in urban areas. The ethnic population was 4,808.

=== Religion ===
Religions in Munshiganj District (2022)
Religion	Percent
Islam	92.34%
Hinduism	7.52%
Other or not stated	0.14%

Religion in present-day Munshiganj District
Religion	1941 (Note: 1941 figures are for Munshiganj subdivision of erstwhile Dhaka district, which roughly corresponds to the present district. District and thana borders have shifted slightly since 1941.)		1981		1991		2001		2011		2022	
Religion	Pop.	%	Pop.	%	Pop.	%	Pop.	%	Pop.	%	Pop.	%
Islam	513,766	58.54%	940,114	88.23%	1,070,443	90.08%	1,181,012	91.27%	1,328,838	91.92%	1,500,984	92.34%
Hinduism	362,986	41.36%	1,23,367	11.58%	114,409	9.63%	110,804	8.56%	114,655	7.93%	122,238	7.52%
Others (Note: Including Jainism, Christianity, Buddhism, Zoroastrianism, Judaism, Ad-Dharmis, or not stated)	891	0.10%	2,092	0.19%	3,535	0.29%	2,156	0.17%	2,167	0.15%	2,194	0.14%
Total Population	877,643	100%	1,065,573	100%	1,188,387	100%	1,293,972	100%	1,445,660	100%	1,625,416	100%

== Notable people ==
=== Liberation war ===
- M. Hamidullah Khan, Bangladesh Forces, Sector Commander, Sector 11, Bangladesh War of Independence 1971

=== Academics and scientists ===
- Sir Jagadish Chandra Bose, Bengali biologist, physicist and botanist

=== Sports ===
- AKM Nowsheruzzaman, national football player
- Brojen Das, the first Asian to swim across the English Channel, and the first person to cross it four times
- Pratap Shankar Hazra, national football and hockey player
- Sharifuzzaman, national football player
- Rokonuzzaman Kanchan, SAFF winning national football player
- Moniruzzaman Khan Jhangir, karate black belt, 5Th den open champion 1985

=== Writer, actors, filmmaker and musicians ===
- Humayun Azad, linguist, poet and novelist
- Alauddin Ali, music composer and director
- Chashi Nazrul Islam, filmmaker
- Nurul Kabir, journalist, writer and editor of New Age
- Imdadul Haq Milan, writer
- Buddhadeb Bosu, writer, poet, playwright, essayist
- Ananta Jalil, actor, director, producer, businessman, and philanthropist
- Tahsan Rahman Khan, singer-songwriter, composer, actor and model.
- Tele Samad, actor
- Azmeri Haque Badhon, actress, dentist
- Shimul Yousuf, actress, singer
- Nazma Anwar, actor

=== Public affairs ===
- A. N. M. Hamidullah, first governor of Bangladesh Bank
- Fakhruddin Ahmed, chief adviser of the non-political 2007-2008 caretaker government of Bangladesh.
- Iajuddin Ahmed, former president of Bangladesh
- A.Q.M. Badruddoza Chowdhury, former president of Bangladesh
- M. A. Naser, engineering educator, vice chancellor of BUET, Ekushey Padak recipient

=== Religious leaders ===
- Ishaq Faridi, Islamic scholar
- Atiśa, Buddhist religious leader and master

== See also ==
- Districts of Bangladesh
- Munshiganj Vihara
- Idrakpur Fort
