= Munshiganj Sadar Upazila =

Old Upazila in Dhaka, Bangladesh

Munshiganj Sadar মুন্সীগঞ্জ সদর
- Upazila
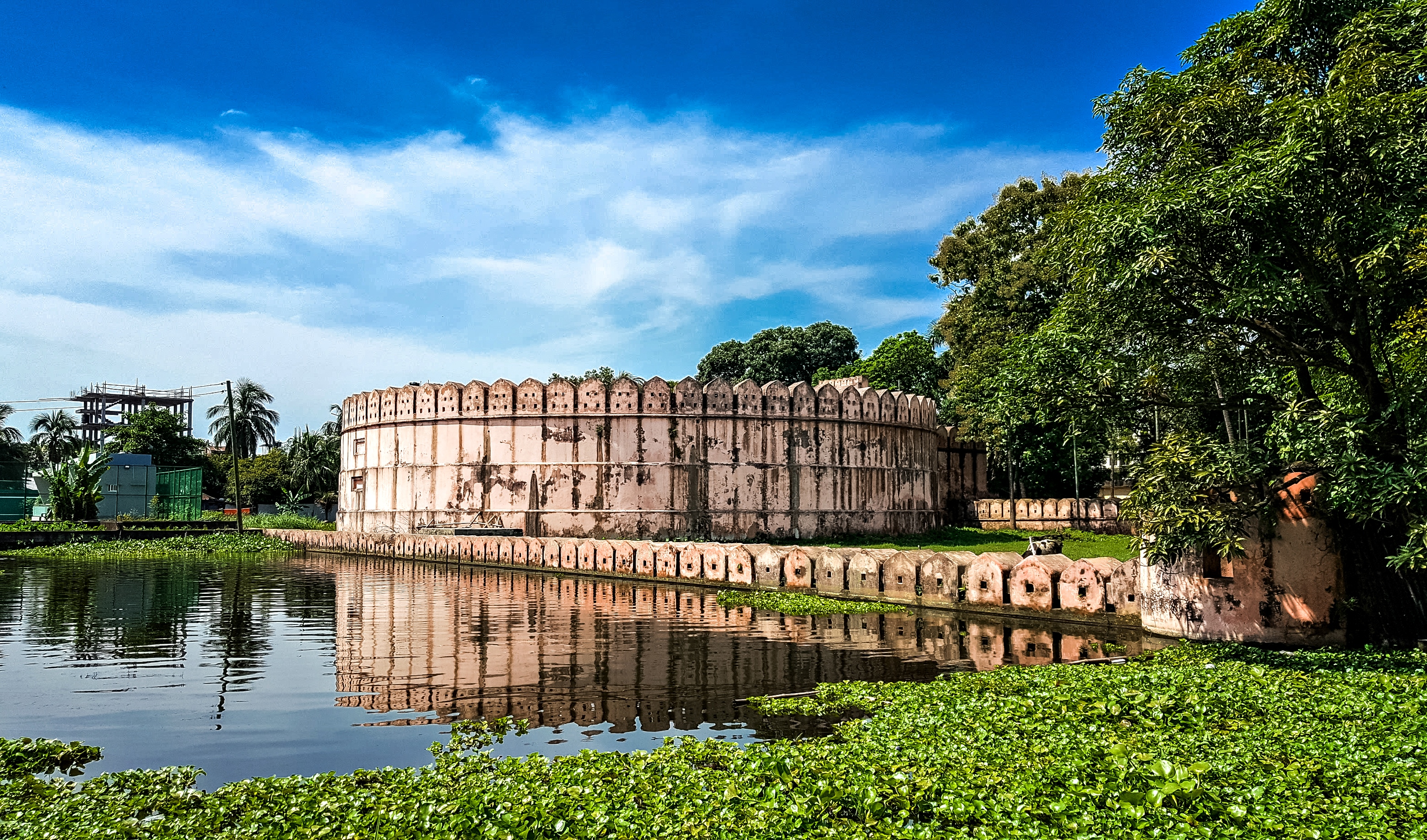
- Idrakpur Fort

- Coordinates: 23.4583°N 90.5417°E
- Country: Bangladesh
- Division: Dhaka
- District: Munshiganj

Area
  - Total: 218.07 km^{2} (84.20 sq mi)

Population (2022)
  - Total: 436,018
  - Density: 1,999.4/km^{2} (5,178.5/sq mi)
- Time zone: UTC+6 (BST)
- Postal code: 1500
- Area code: 0691
- Website: sadar.munshiganj.gov.bd

Munshiganj Sadar Upazila mauza geocode map

Munshiganj Sadar (Bengali: মুন্সীগঞ্জ সদর) is an upazila of Munshiganj District in the Division of Dhaka, Bangladesh.

== History ==
=== In 1971 ===
On 29 March 1971, days after the start of the Bangladesh War of Independence, people of Munshiganj raided the armoury and captured arms and ammunition, which they used to resist the Pakistan Army. The people of Narayanganj and Munshiganj together resisted an attack of the Pakistan Army on 31 March. The Pakistan Army killed some youths at Kewar on 14 May.

== Demographics ==
Religions in Munshiganj Sadar Upazila (2022)
Religion	Percent
Islam	95.59%
Hinduism	4.39%
Other or not stated	0.02%

According to the 2022 Bangladeshi census, Munshiganj Sadar Upazila had 107,624 households and a population of 436,018. 9.22% of the population were under 5 years of age. Munshiganj Sadar had a literacy rate (age 7 and over) of 77.24%: 78.18% for males and 76.34% for females, and a sex ratio of 96.89 males for every 100 females. 187,039 (42.90%) lived in urban areas.

According to the 2011 Census of Bangladesh, Munshiganj Sadar Upazila had 81,146 households and a population of 383,263. 82,488 (21.52%) were under 10 years of age. Munshiganj Sadar had a literacy rate (age 7 and over) of 55.17%, compared to the national average of 51.8%, and a sex ratio of 970 females per 1000 males. 138,205 (36.06%) lived in urban areas.

As of the 1991 Bangladesh census, Munshiganj district, formerly a subdivision under Dhaka district, was established in 1984. It consists of 6 upazilas, 67 union parishads, 662 mouzas, 906 villages, 18 wards, 73 mahallas and 2 municipalities.

== Administration ==
Munshiganj Sadar Upazila is divided into Mirkadim Municipality, Munshiganj Municipality, and nine union parishads: Adhara, Bajrajogini, Banglabazar, Charkewar, Mohakali, Mollakandi, Panchashar, Rampal, and Shiloy. The union parishads are subdivided into 94 mauzas and 196 villages.

Mirkadim Municipality and Munshiganj Municipality are each subdivided into 9 wards.

== Education ==
There are six colleges in the upazila: Government Haraganga College, Mirkadim Hazi Amzad Ali (Degree) College, Munshigonj College, Munshigonj Government Mohila College, President Prof. DR. Iajuddin Ahmed Residential Model School & College, and Rampal College.

According to Banglapedia, notable secondary schools include A. V. G. M. Government Girls' High School, founded in 1892, Bajrajogini J. K. High School (1883), Basirannesa High School (1972), Rikaby Bazar GIRLS' High School, Binodpur Ramkumar High School (1919), Edrakpur High School (1970), K. K. Government Institution (1942), Munshiganj M. L. High School (1885), and Rampal N. B. M. High School (1933) Mirkadim Hazi Amzad Ali High School.

== Notable residents ==
- A M Nurul Islam, civil servant, attended Munshiganj High School.

== See also ==
- Upazilas of Bangladesh
- Districts of Bangladesh
- Divisions of Bangladesh
