= List of hospitals in Bangladesh =

This is a list of hospitals in Bangladesh.

In 2023 the total number of hospitals in Bangladesh was 5,816.

- Anwer Khan Modern Medical College Dhanmondi, Dhaka
- Ad-din Akij Medical College Hospital, Khulna
- Ad-din Sakina Medical College Hospital, Jessore
- Ad-din Women's Medical College Hospital, Dhaka
- Aichi Hospital, Dhaka
- Arif Memorial Hospital, Barishal
- Al Haramain Hospital, Sylhet
- Ambia Memorial Hospital, Barisal
- AMZ Hospital Ltd. Dhaka
- Anwer Khan Modern Hospital Ltd, Dhaka
- Ashiyan Medical College Hospital, Dhaka
- Bangladesh Assisted Conception Center, Women’s & Children Hospital Pvt Limited (BACC) Dhaka
- Bangladesh Neonatal Hospital, Signboard Mor, Narayanganj
- Bangabandhu Memorial Hospital (BBMH), Chittagong
- Bangladesh Medical University
- Bangladesh Eye Hospital Limited, Dhaka
- Bangladesh Medical College Hospital, Dhaka
- Bangladesh Specialized Hospital
- Bangladesh Spine & Orthopaedic General Hospital Ltd, Panthapath, Dhaka.
- Basundhura Hospital (Pvt.) Ltd.
- BGB Hospital
- Bangladesh Institute of Research and Rehabilitation for Diabetes, Endocrine and Metabolic Disorders (BIRDEM)
- BRB Hospital- Panthapath Dhaka
- Cardio Care Specialized and General Hospital Ltd, Dhaka
- Care Hospital, Dhaka
- Care Zone Hospital, Dhaka
- Catharsis Medical Centre Limited, Gazipur
- Central Hospital, Dhaka
- Central Veterinary Hospital
- Chander Hasi Hospital Limited, Habiganj, Sylhet.
- Chittagong Eye Infirmary and Training Hospital
- Chittagong Maa-O-Shishu Hospital, Chittagong
- Chittagong Diabetic General Hospital
- Chittagong Medical College Hospital
- CMH (Combined Military Hospital)
- Comilla Medical College Hospital, Comilla
- Continental Hospital, Dhaka
- Cox's Bazar Hospital for Women & Children, Chittagong
- Dhaka Central International Medical College Hospital, Adabor, Dhaka
- Dhaka Community Hospital
- Dhaka Dental College and Hospital
- Dhaka Hospital, Dhaka
- Dhaka Medical College & Hospital
- Dhaka National Medical College And Hospital Institute
- Dhaka Shishu Hospital
- Dinajpur Medical College Hospital
- Dr. Alauddin Ahmed Clinic, Jhalakati
- Duwell Medical
- Eastern Hospital & Medical Research Centre
- Esperto Health Care & Research Center, Dhaka
- Evercare Hospital Dhaka
- Farazy Hospital Ltd, Dhaka
- Farazy Dental Hospital & Research Center, Dhaka
- Gazi Medical College Hospital, Khulna
- Genuine Cancer Hospital Limited, Chittagong
- Gonoshasthaya Nagar Hospital
- Government Employee Hospital
- Government Homeopathic Medical College Hospital
- Greenland Hospital Limited, Sector - 10, Uttara, Dhaka.
- Holy Family Red Crescent Medical College Hospital, Dhaka
- Ibn Sina Hospital Sylhet Ltd
- Ibn Sina Hospitals, Dhaka
- Institute of Child and Mother Health, Dhaka
- Institute of Laser Surgery & Hospital, Dhaka
- Ispahani Islamia Eye Institute and Hospital (IIEI&H)
- Japan East West Medical College Hospital, Dhaka
- Khwaja Yunus Ali Medical College and Hospital
- Khulna Medical College Hospital, Khulna
- Kumudini Hospital, Tangail
- Kuwait Bangladesh Friendship Govt. Hospital, Uttara, Dhaka
- Labaid Cardiac Hospital, Dhaka
- Labaid Specialised Hospital, Dhaka
- Insaf Barakah Kidney and General Hospital
- Maa Nursing Home & Diagnostic Centre, Tangail
- Medinova Medical Services Ltd.
- MH Samorita Hospital & Medical College, love Road, Tejgaon, Dhaka
- Mikrani Dental Banasree Dhaka (Dental Hospital) Dhaka
- Mojibunnessa Eye Hospital, Dhaka
- Moulana Bhasani Medical College Hospital, Dhaka
- Mount Adora Hospital, Sylhet.
- Mental Hospital, Pabna
- Mugda Medical College & Hospital, Dhaka
- Mymensingh Medical College Hospital
- National Hospital Chattagram, Chattagram
- National Heart Foundation, Sylhet.
- National Institute of Cardiovascular Diseases
- National Institute of Ear, Nose and Throat
- National Institute of Kidney Disease & Urology
- National Institute of Mental Health
- National Institute of Mental Health and Hospital
- National Institute of Neuroscience
- National Institute of Ophthalmology and Hospital
- National Institute of Preventive and Social Medicine
- North East Medical College and Hospital
- Nurjahan Hospital Ltd, Sylhet.
- Oasis Hospital (Pvt) Ltd, Sylhet
- Sylhet, M.A.G Osmani Medical College and Hospital
- Pongu Hospital Jessore (Railget, Mujib Sarak, Jessore, Bangladesh)
- Popular Specialized Hospital Ltd.
- Rajshahi Medical College Hospital
- Rangpur Medical College Hospital, Rangpur
- Rashmono General Hospital, Dhaka
- Royal Hospital and research Center Ltd., Chittagong
- Royal Hospital And Research Center Ltd., Chittagong
- Saint Martin Hospital
- Samorita Hospital Ltd.
- Saphena Women's Dental College & Hospital
- Shaheed Monsur Ali Medical College Hospital, Dhaka
- Shaheed Ziaur Rahman Medical College Hospital, Bogra
- Shalahuddin Hospital
- Sheikh Fazilatunnessa Mujib Memorial KPJ Specialized Hospital & Nursing College
- Sher-e-Bangla Medical College Hospital, Barisal
- Siddiqia Eye Foundation, Mymensingh
- Sir Salimullah Medical College & Mitford Hospital, Dhaka
- Square Hospital Ltd., Dhaka
- Sylhet Eye Hospital & Laser Centre
- Sylhet Maa O Shishu Hospital
- Sylhet Medical College Hospital
- Sylhet Women's Medical College
- The Medical College for Women and Hospital
- Union Specialized Hospital Limited, Aftabnagor, Dhaka
- Z.H. Sikder Women's Medical College and Hospital (Pvt.) Ltd.
- Zia Heart Foundation Hospital & Research Institute
- Shaheed Ahsan Ullah Master General Hospital
- Shaheed Suhrawardy Medical College & Hospital
- Universal Medical College and Hospital, Dhaka
- Ayesha Haque Hospital, Beanibazar, Sylhet
- Charkhai Multicare Hospital, Beanibazar, Sylhet
- National Institute of Burn and Plastic Surgery (Dhaka)
- National Gastroliver Institute & Hospital (Dhaka)
