= Kamrul Islam (physician) =

Bangladeshi urologist

- কামরুল ইসলাম
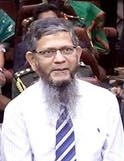
- Kamrul in 2022
- Born: Pabna, Bangladesh
- Citizenship: Bangladesh
- Education: Dhaka College; Dhaka Medical College; BSMMU; Royal College of Surgeons of Edinburgh
- Occupations: Surgeon, Urologist
- Years active: 1993–present
- Organization: CKD and Urology Hospital
- Known for: Kidney transplantation surgery; treating patients free of charge
- Children: 3 daughters
- Parents: Aminul Islam (father); Rahima Khatun (mother)
- Awards: Independence Award in medical science (2022)

Kamrul Islam is a Bangladeshi physician and surgeon. He is known as a kidney transplant surgeon in Bangladesh and received the Independence Award in 2022 for his contributions to medical science.

== Biography ==
Kamrul Islam’s father, Aminul Islam, was an agronomist at the Pabna Sugarcane Research Centre of the Bangladesh Sugarcrop Research Institute. His mother, Rahima Khatun, was a professor. He is the second of four siblings.

In 1980, he completed his secondary education at Chandraprabha Vidyapith in Pabna, ranking 15th in the Rajshahi Division merit list. He then enrolled at Dhaka College and ranked 10th in his higher secondary examination in 1982.

He studied in the 40th batch of Dhaka Medical College. In 1990, he ranked first in the combined examination of eight medical colleges and obtained his MBBS degree with a gold medal. He received FCPS in 1995, MS in Urology from BSMMU in 2000, and FRCS from the Royal College of Surgeons of Edinburgh in 2003.

== Career ==
In 1993, Kamrul Islam joined the health cadre through BCS. He also served as an assistant professor at the National Institute of Kidney Diseases & Urology Hospital.

In 2007, he successfully performed a kidney transplant for the first time. In 2011, he resigned from government service and later established his own institution. In 2014, he founded the Centre for Kidney Diseases and Urology Hospital.

As of October 2023, more than one thousand kidney transplants have been performed under his leadership, representing about one-third of the country’s total kidney transplants. During the COVID-19 pandemic, when many hospitals suspended surgeries, his institution performed 255 kidney transplants. The average cost of a transplant at his hospital is reported to be 210,000 taka, with a success rate of about 95 percent.

== Awards ==
- Independence Award, medical science (2022)

== Personal life ==
Kamrul Islam is the father of three daughters.
