= National Institute of Mental Health (disambiguation) =

National Institute of Mental Health may refer to:

- National Institute of Mental Health, an agency of the United States Department of Health and Human Services
- National Institute of Mental Health and Hospital, mental health institution and hospital in Dhaka, Bangladesh
- National Institute of Mental Health and Neurosciences, a medical institution in Bangalore, India
