= Pioneer Dental College & Hospital =

Geography
- Location: Baridhara, Dhaka, Bangladesh
- Coordinates: 23.8139°N 90.4157°E

Organisation
- Type: Specialist
- Affiliated university: University of Dhaka

Services
- Speciality: Dentistry

History
- Opened: 1995

Links
- Website: www.pioneerdentalcollegeandhospital.com
- Lists: Hospitals in Bangladesh

Pioneer Dental College & Hospital is the first and the oldest private dental college and hospital in Bangladesh. It was founded in 1995 at Malibag area of Dhaka. In 2007 it shifted to its present permanent campus located in Baridhara, Dhaka. This college conducted a bachelor's degree program in dentistry (BDS) as an affiliated dental school of Faculty of Medicine, at the University of Dhaka.

== See also ==
- List of dental schools in Bangladesh
