= Central Veterinary Hospital =

Hospital in Dhaka, Bangladesh

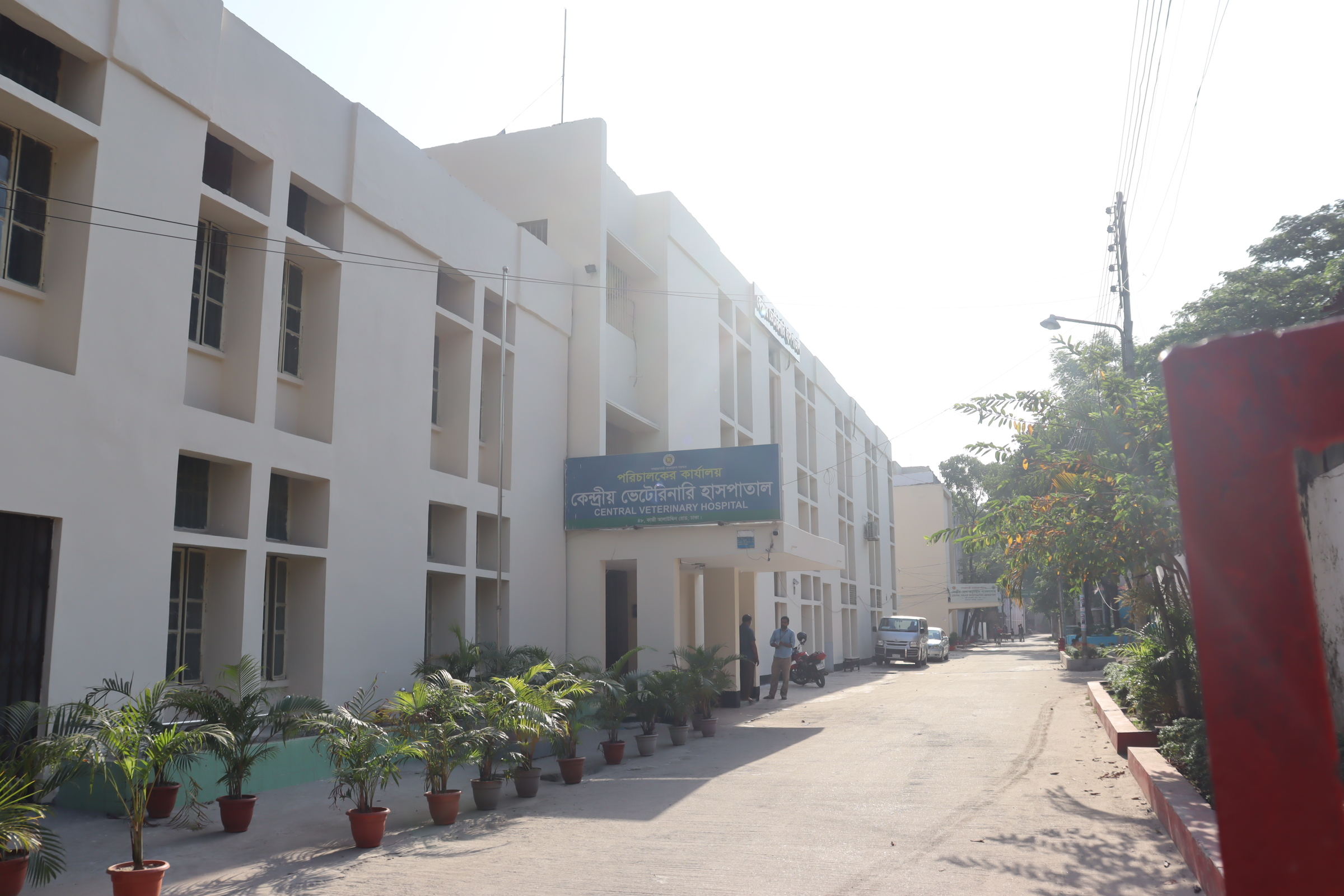

Geography
- Location: Kazi Alauddin Road, Old Dhaka, Dhaka, Bangladesh
- Coordinates: 23.7230108°N 90.4036322°E

Organisation
- Care system: Bangladesh Veterinary Council
- Type: Government
- Patron: Ministry of Health

History
- Founded: 1920; 106 years ago

Links
- Website: cvh.dhakadiv.gov.bd
- Lists: Hospitals in Bangladesh

Central Veterinary Hospital, alternatively known as Animal Hospital, is a veterinary hospital located in Old Dhaka, Bangladesh. The hospital was established through the initiative of Khwaja Salimullah, Nawab of Dhaka.

== Location ==
Central Veterinary Hospital is a veterinary hospital in Old Dhaka. It is located on Kazi Alauddin Road, opposite Bangabazar in Dhaka, Bangladesh.

== History ==
In 1918, Khwaja Salimullah, Nawab of Dhaka, donated 3.4 acres of land for the construction of a hospital to treat sick horses. The veterinary hospital was established on that land in 1920. Construction of the hospital's new building was completed in 1985. In 2018, the government of India donated equipments to the hospital. In 2019, a proposal was submitted to the government to transform the 3-acre hospital into a full-fledged central veterinary hospital.

== Conditions ==
Although treatment facilities are available for animals at this hospital, there are no admission facilities. According to 2021, only four veterinarians were on duty there. According to 2022, the it regularly receives at least 200 patients. According to a 2025 report, most of the patients brought to the hospital were cats.
