= Sheikh Russel =

Youngest child of Sheikh Mujibur Rahman (1964–1975)

- শেখ রাসেল
- Born: Sheikh Russel; October 18, 1964; Dacca, East Pakistan, Pakistan
- Died: August 15, 1975 (aged 10); Dhaka, Bangladesh
- Cause of death: Assassination
- Citizenship: Pakistani (1964–1971); Bangladeshi (1971–1975)
- Education: University Laboratory School and College
- Occupation: Student
- Parents: Sheikh Mujibur Rahman; Begum Fazilatunnesa
- Relatives: See Tungipara Sheikh family
- Family: Sheikh Hasina (sister); Sheikh Kamal (older brother); Sheikh Jamal (older brother); Sheikh Rehana (older sister); Sultana Khuki (sister-in-law)

Sheikh Russel (Note: Bengali: শেখ রাসেল, romanized: Śēkh Rāsēl [ˈʃeːkʰ ˈɾɑsel]) (October 18, 1964 – August 15, 1975) was the youngest child of Sheikh Mujibur Rahman, the first President of Bangladesh. Russel and most of his direct family were killed in their home during the 1975 military coup.

== Early life ==
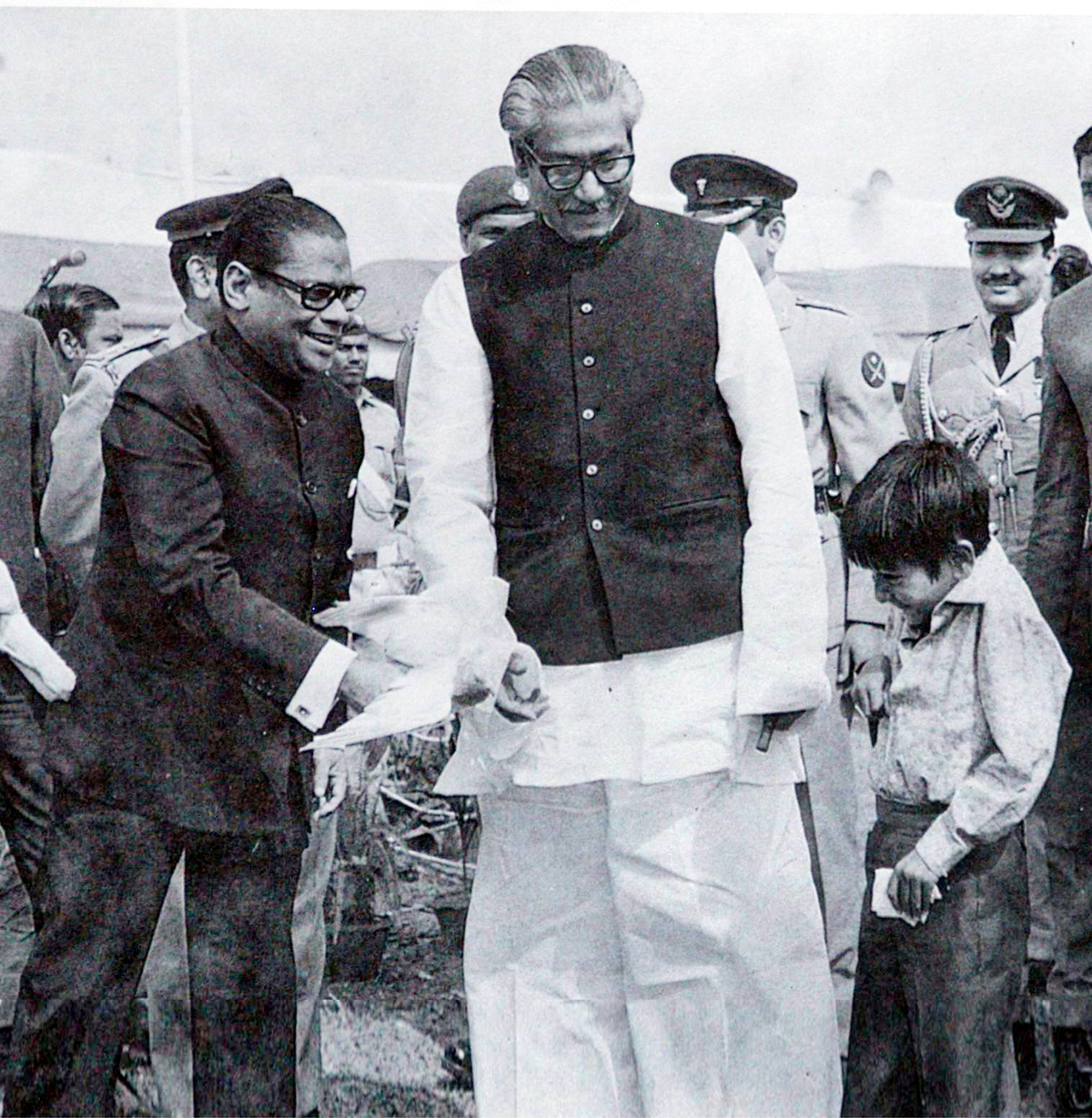
Russel with his father Sheikh Mujib

Russel was born on October 18, 1964, at Bangabandhu Bhaban in Dhanmondi, Dhaka, Bangladesh, the youngest child of Sheikh Mujibur Rahman and Begum Fazilatunnesa. He was named after Bertrand Russell. During his father's repeated imprisonments by the Pakistani authorities in the 1960s, Russel accompanied other members of his family on prison visits. According to contemporary accounts and later recollections, he was particularly attached to his father and was deeply affected by his prolonged absences.

During the Bangladesh Liberation War in 1971, he was placed under house arrest along with the rest of his family after the Pakistani military detained Sheikh Mujibur Rahman. Following Bangladesh's independence he and his family were released from house arrest on 17 December 1971. The family was reunited when Rahman returned from imprisonment. He accompanied his father in October 1973 on a state visit to Japan. He was a student of the University Laboratory School and College.

== Death ==
Russel was killed in the 15 August 1975 Bangladeshi coup d'état. He was buried in Banani Graveyard along with the rest of his family killed in the coup. During the assassination, his sister went to visit Germany. Sheikh Hasina wanted to take Russell with them, but their mother didn't allow that because Sheikh Russell was sick at the time.

== Legacy ==
Several athletic organizations in Bangladesh have been named in memory of Russel, including the professional football club Sheikh Russel Krira Chakra, the Sheikh Russel School Table Tennis Tournament, the Sheikh Russel Memorial Sporting Club, and the Sheikh Russel Roller Skating Complex. In April 2014, a children's park named Sheikh Russel Shishutosh Angan was established in Kalabagan, Dhaka. His birthday is observed annually by Bangladesh Awami League.

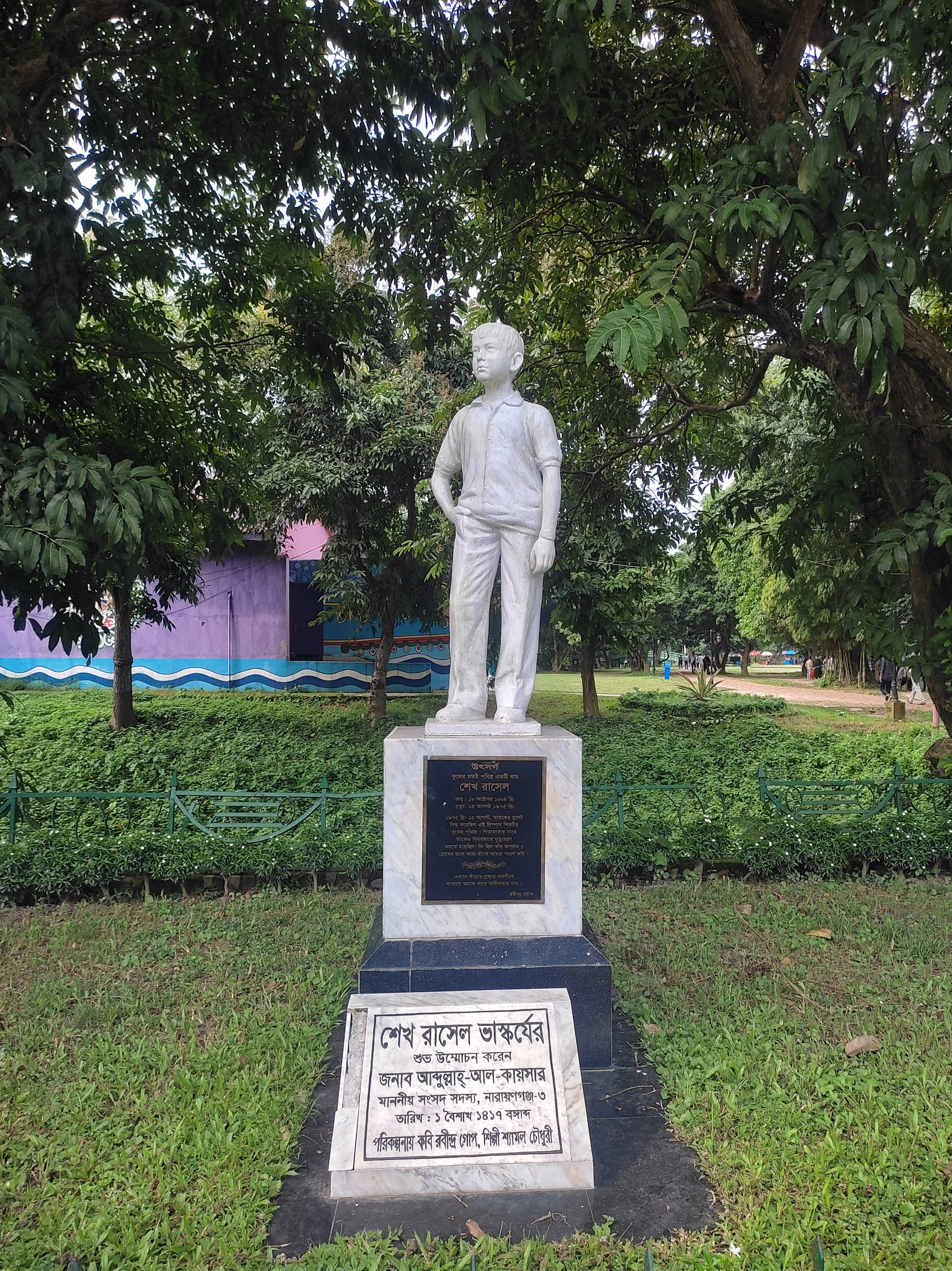
Sculpture of Sheikh Russel

On February 20, 2016, Prime Minister Hasina opened the Shaheed Sheikh Russel Bridge on the Shibbaria River. On October 2, 2016, the Information and Communication Technology Division, Ministry of Posts, Telecom. and Information Technology, announced plans to build 2,000 computer labs named Sheikh Russel Digital Labs (SRDLs) in schools and colleges across Bangladesh.

In October 2018, Sheikh Russel National Gastroliver Institute & Hospital was named after him. The Sheikh Russell National Gastro Liver Institute and Hospital was renamed to National Gastroliver Institute & Hospital in November 2024, following the fall of the Sheikh Hasina-led Awami League government. The 2021 announcement of Sheikh Russel Day by the Cabinet Division was also cancelled.

Initially, the Padma Cantonment was named after Russel. Two schools, run by Bangladesh Army, were also named after him – Sheikh Russel Cantonment Public School and College, one at Shariatpur and another one at Narayanganj. The Aviary and Eco-Park, Rangunia was also named after him. A bridge connecting Kushtia and Haripur is known as the Sheikh Russel Bridge.

== In popular culture ==
Sheikh Russel was portrayed in an animated film named Amader Choto Russel Shona, released on 1 November 2023. Produced by Information and Communication Technology Division, it has been released on almost all OTT platforms in Bangladesh.
