= Love Road, Tejgaon =

Street in Tejgaon, Dhaka, Bangladesh

Love Road
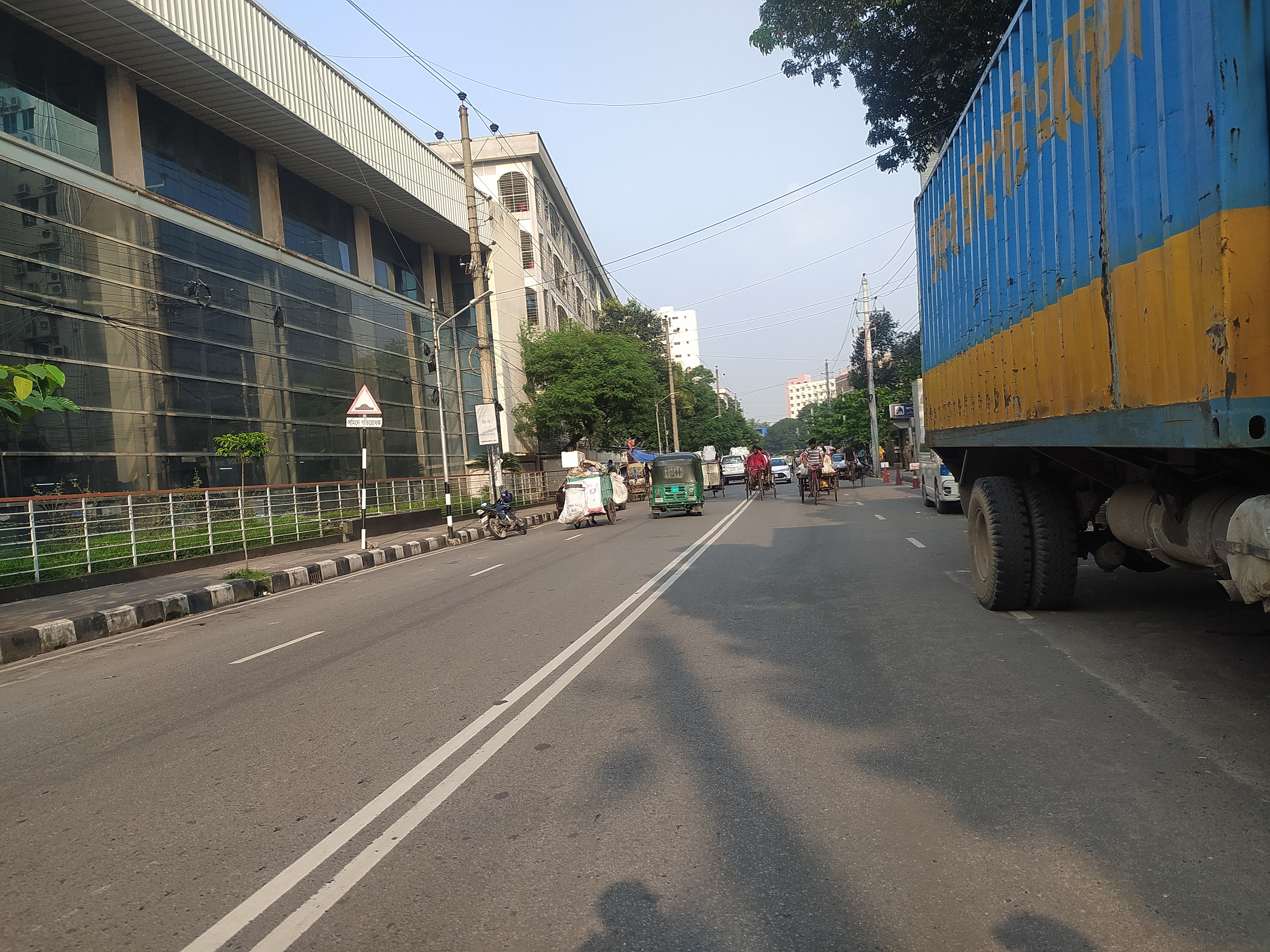
- Native name: লাভ রোড (Bengali)
- Type: Street
- Maintained by: Dhaka North City Corporation
- Location: Tejgaon Industrial Area Thana, Dhaka, Bangladesh
- Coordinates: 23.7657092°N 90.4032212°E
- North: Shaheed Tajuddin Ahmed Avenue
- South: Moghbazar Road

Other
- Status: Active

Love Road is a street in Tejgaon Industrial Area, Dhaka. It was named by Bangladeshi journalist Shafik Rehman who had headquarters of his newspaper Jaijaidin at the street. It was the symbol of love in the city and couples used to visit there. It was a place of street foods too. It is the place of important structures and offices including Ahsanullah University of Science and Technology, Milk Vita, Roads and Highways Department, and National Institute of Ear, Nose and Throat.
