= Milk Vita =

Bangladeshi milk production company

- Seal of Milk Vita
- Formation: 1974
- Headquarters: Love Road, Tejgaon, Dhaka, Bangladesh
- Region served: Bangladesh
- Website: milkvita.portal.gov.bd

Milk Vita is a milk production company that produces milk under its own name. It is owned by Bangladesh Milk Producers Co-operative Union Limited, a cooperative managed by itself. Milk Vita has 40 percent market share of liquid milk in Bangladesh as of 2021.

== History ==
The company was established as a cooperative that would collect milk from farmers in rural areas and sell them in urban areas of Bangladesh. Products manufactured by the company include liquid milk, yogurt, cream, powder milk, butter, and ghee. The company was founded in 1974. In 2016, a government report found 12 private milk producers in Bangladesh were imitating the packaging of Milk Vita.
