= National Institute of Ear, Nose and Throat =

Coordinates: 23.7633°N 90.4055°E

National Institute of ENT

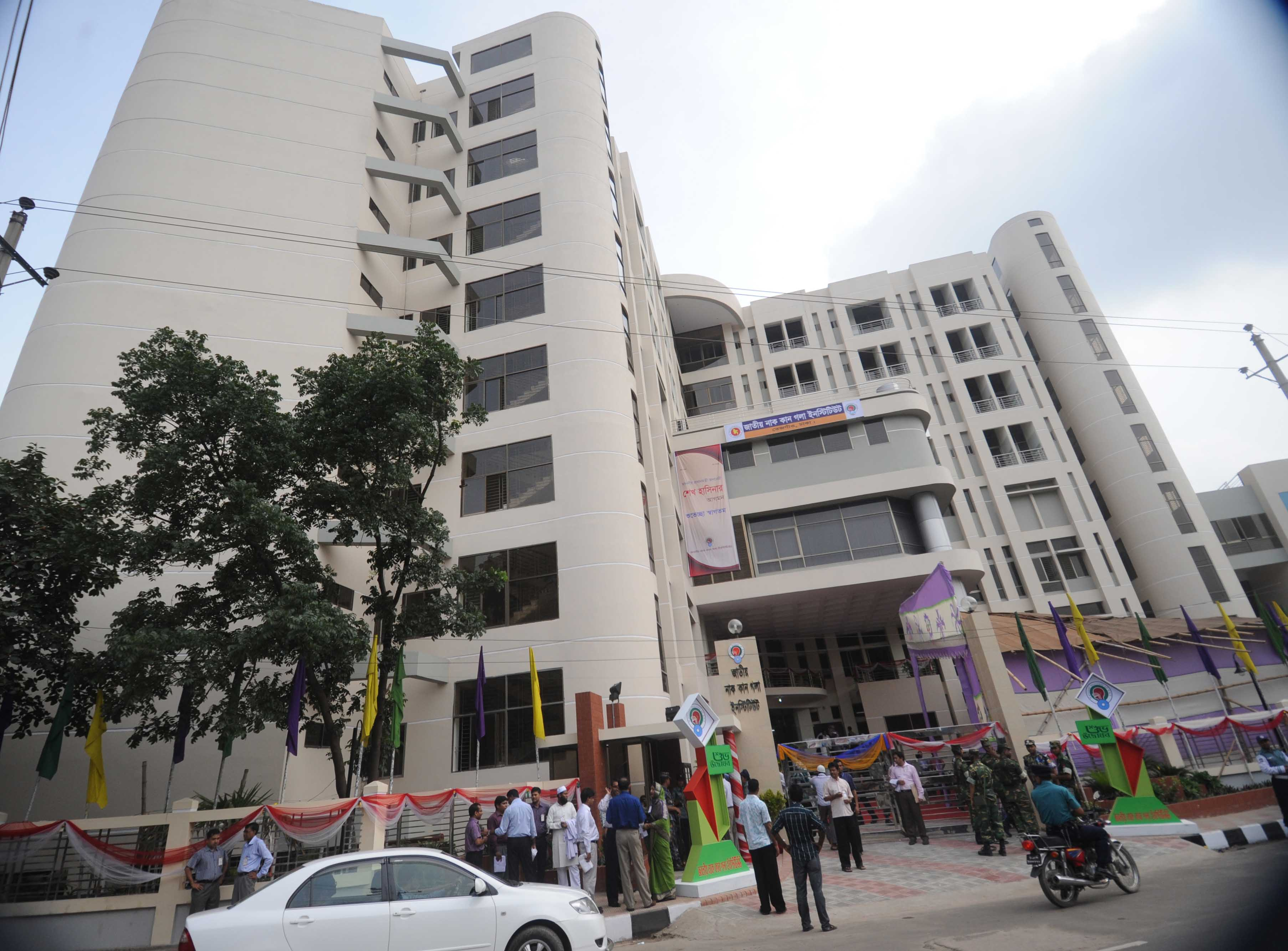

Geography
- Location: Love Road, Tejgaon, Dhaka-1208, Bangladesh

History
- Founded: 2013

Links
- Website: nient.gov.bd
- Lists: Hospitals in Bangladesh

The National Institute of Ear, Nose and Throat (Bengali: জাতীয় নাক কান গলা ইনস্টিটিউট) is a specialized hospital and training center of otorhinolaryngology. It is located in Tejgaon, Dhaka, Bangladesh.

== History ==
Construction of the National Institute of ENT began in 2009 and the new 12-storied building was inaugurated by the prime minister of Bangladesh, Sheikh Hasina, on 19 June 2013. When fully functional, the 250-bed specialized institute would have an international standard audio-vestibular lab, sleep lab and voice study lab. It would serve as an important center for training professionals in the treatment of ENT disorders.

In January 2021, Md. Abu Hanif was reappointed director of the National Institute of ENT. The Daily Star reported in May 2021 the operations of the National Institute of ENT were hampered due to a shortage of medical personnel at the institute. The principal of the institute, Mohammad Abu Hanif, alleged the recruitment were impeded by lack of cooperation from the Ministry of Health and Family Welfare.

In February 2022, the Health Audit Directorate of the Ministry of Health and Family Welfare found evidence of financial irregularities in 26 purchases by the institute causing 266 million BDT in losses. Contractors were hired without tenders and suppliers were paid without the products being delivered.
