= Kuwait Bangladesh Friendship Government Hospital =

Kuwait Bangladesh Friendship Govt. Hospital
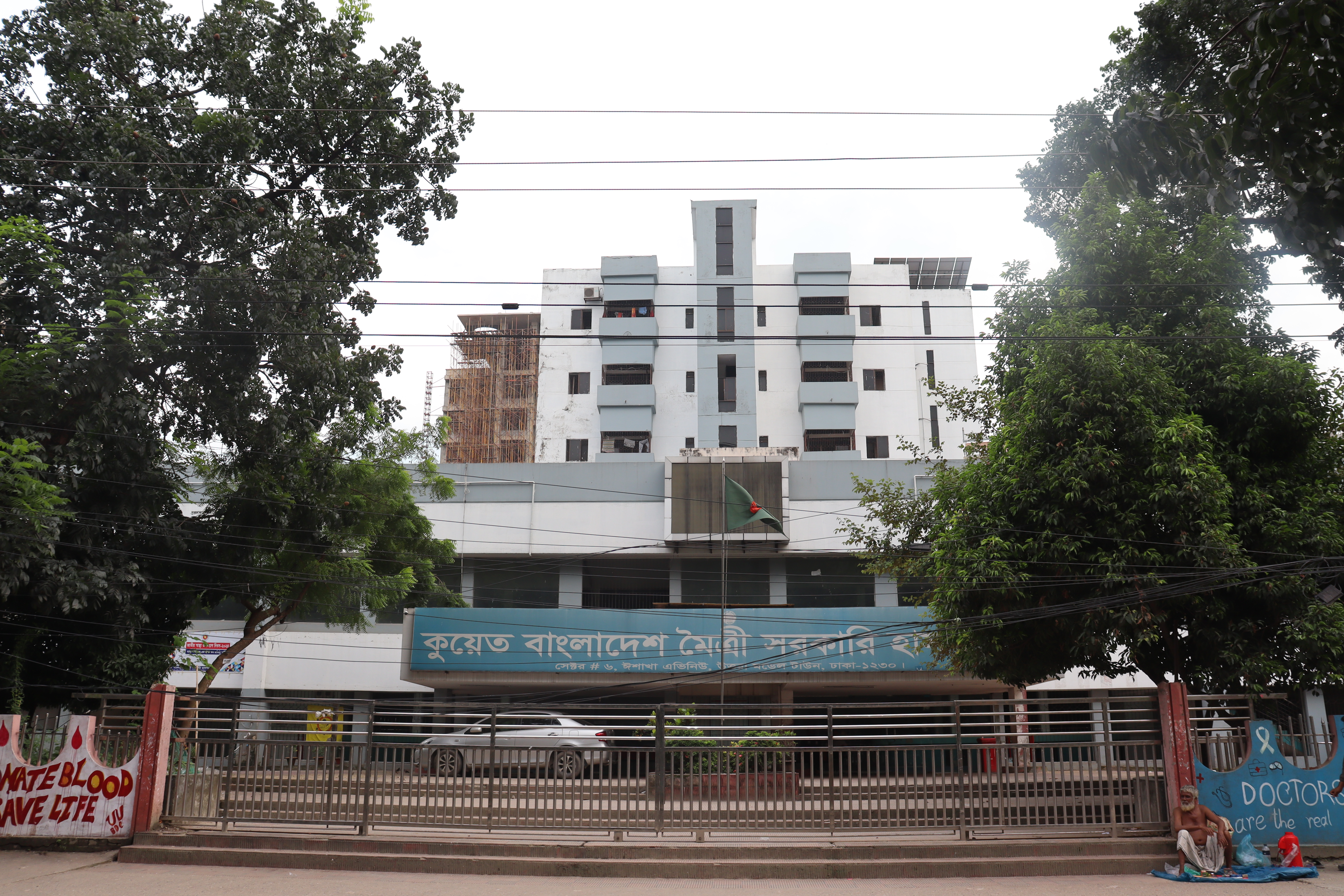

Geography
- Location: Uttara, Dhaka, Bangladesh
- Coordinates: 23.870432°N 90.403647°E

Organisation
- Type: Government
- Patron: Ministry of Health

Services
- Beds: 200

History
- Constructed: 1992
- Founded: 10 June 2001; 25 years ago

Kuwait Bangladesh Friendship Govt. Hospital (Bengali: কুয়েত বাংলাদেশ মৈত্রী সরকারি হাসপাতাল) or Kuwait Bangladesh Hospital is a government hospital situated in Dhaka, Bangladesh. The hospital was funded by Kuwaiti Joint Relief Committee. This is the first hospital to provide medical services to coronavirus infected patients as prescribed by the Government of Bangladesh.

== Location ==
Kuwait Bangladesh Friendship Hospital is located on Isha Khan Avenue, Sector 6, Uttara, Dhaka. The hospital is located behind RAJUK Uttara Model College.

== History ==
On 10 June 2001, Prime Minister Sheikh Hasina inaugurated Kuwait-Bangladesh Friendship Hospital. In 2002, the Kuwaiti Joint Relief Committee stopped funding the hospital, showing financial crisis reason.

A lease agreement was made between The Ministry of Health and American Hospital Consortium on December 16, 2002. According to the agreement, The government transferred its responsibility to American Hospital Consortium. After the agreement name of the hospital was changed to "American Super Specialised Hospital". According to the agreement the responsible side had to upgrade the hospital to international standards by June 30, 2008. But the organisation failed to do so. Then in 2009 the government sued American Hospital Consortium for taking over rights of the government hospital illegally, leaving the matter of agreement cancellation pending. Six years later, the court ruled in favor of the government and the custody of the hospital was given to the health ministry.

The hospital was reopened later under the management of the Ministry of Health. Its responsibility was transferred to Kurmitola General Hospital in June 2016. After two years ministry of health appointed new director. In December of the same year the indoor service with 100 beds was opened.

== Staff and services ==
As of May 2020, the hospital has 200 beds. There are 26 ICU beds. The hospital has 95 doctors for medical services. There are 113 nurses. There are three Ayurvedic doctors in charge of this hospital. Various services are provided here in about 22 departments including operation theater, ICU, examination department, cabin, ward, outpatient department and emergency department.

== Infrastructure ==
The Kuwait-Bangladesh Friendship Hospital is located in three acres land. The hospital has a seven-storied building.

== Role in pandemic ==
This hospital was the first hospital the government of Bangladesh designated for the medical care of corona patients. The hospital was made into a major coronavirus treatment center.

== See also ==
- List of hospitals in Bangladesh
