= Aviary and Eco-Park, Rangunia =

Aviary and eco-park in Bangladesh

Aviary and Eco-Park, Rangunia, Chattogram
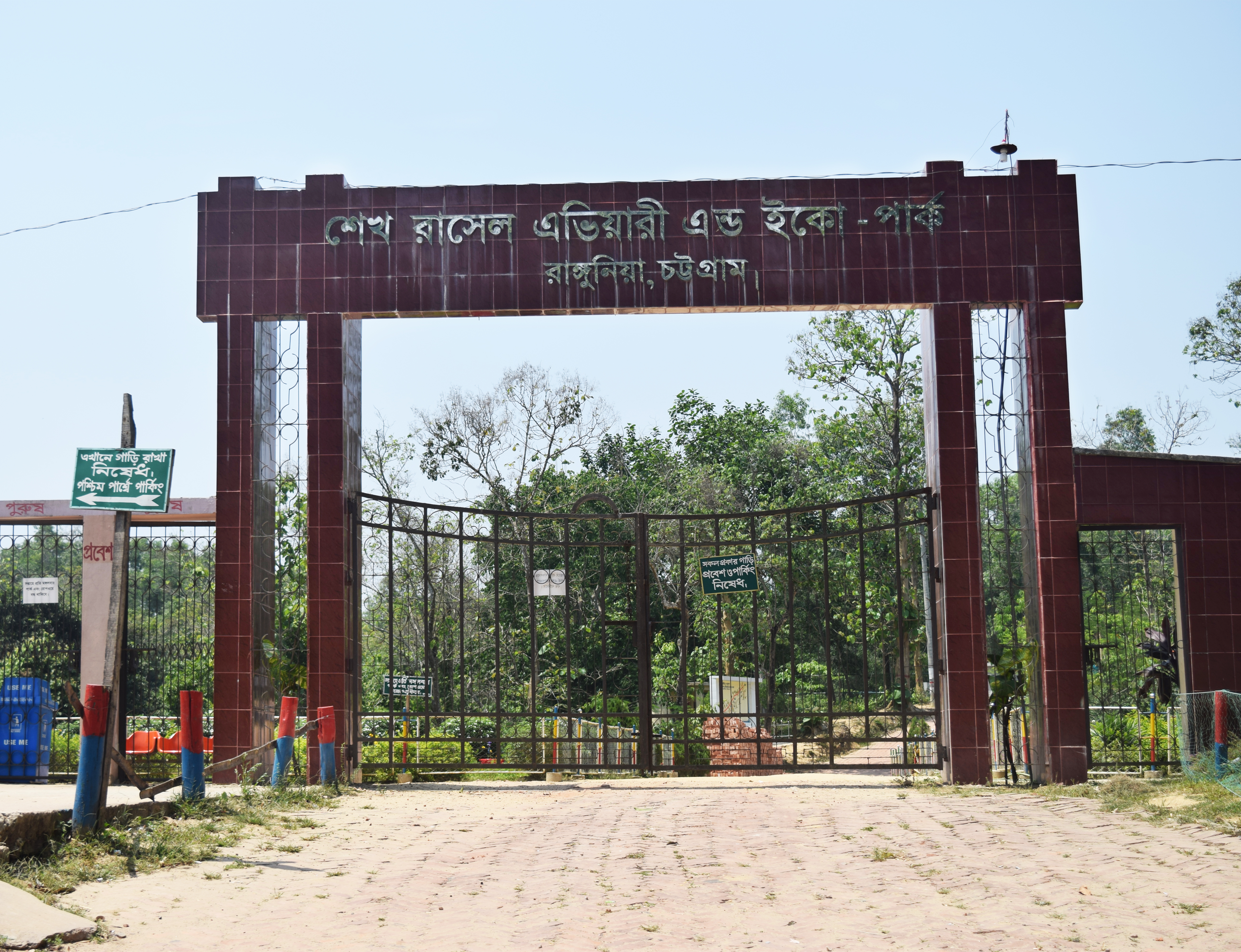
- Gate of the Aviary and Eco-Park in 2016

- Location within Bangladesh
- Location: South Nishchintapur, Hosnabad Union, Rangunia, Chattogram
- Coordinates: 22.4935°N 92.1210°E
- Area: 4.20 ha (10.4 acres)
- Established: 7 August 2010
- Named for: Sheikh Russel

Aviary and Eco-Park, formerly known as Sheikh Russel Aviary and Eco-Park, is a bird sanctuary and eco-park located in Rangunia, Chattogram District, Bangladesh. The park was originally named after Sheikh Russel, the youngest son of Bangladesh’s founding president, Sheikh Mujibur Rahman. In May 2025, "Sheikh Russel" was officially removed from the park's name.

== History ==
The foundation stone of Sheikh Russel Aviary and Eco-Park was laid on 7 August 2010. On 13 November 2013, Ex Prime Minister Sheikh Hasina officially inaugurated the park via video conference. In 2025, the third revision of the project was presented to the Executive Committee of the National Economic Council (ECNEC), allocating a budget of 400.43 million BDT.

=== Birds and Biodiversity ===
The park houses around 200 rare and endangered native bird species. Notable ones include the baya weaver, oriental magpie-robin, shyama, myna, eagle, vulture, bulbul, owl, oriole, tailorbird, parakeet, dove, kingfisher, and white egret. The park also features exotic birds like African pelicans, swans, ring-necked parrots, eclectus parrots, and macaws.

Besides bird conservation, various infrastructures have been developed to make the park environmentally and tourist-friendly. These include bird-friendly gardens, rest houses for visitors, a hanging bridge, a modern restaurant, lake, sloped benches, a watchtower, and children’s play areas. The park is surrounded by special netting to allow birds to move freely and safely.

Nearly 71,000 medicinal and other useful trees, along with 30,000 ornamental trees, have been planted. Additionally, a deer sanctuary and a crocodile breeding center have been set up. Research opportunities are also available for university-level students interested in wildlife studies.

=== Geographic Features ===
The park features a cable car that enhances its attraction. It stretches about 2.5 kilometers and runs approximately 200 feet above the ground, connecting two hilltops. The view includes a vast blue sky above and lush green forests and a lake below, highlighting the park’s natural beauty.

== Location ==
The park is situated in South Nishchintapur, within Hosnabad Union of Rangunia Upazila, Chattogram District. It lies within the Kodala Forest Beat. It takes about an hour to reach the park by bus from the Bahaddarhat Bus Terminal in Chattogram city via the Chattogram-Kaptai Road.

The park spans 520 acres. Its foundation was laid on 7 August 2010 and it was officially inaugurated on 13 November 2013 by then-Prime Minister Sheikh Hasina via teleconference.

== Gallery ==
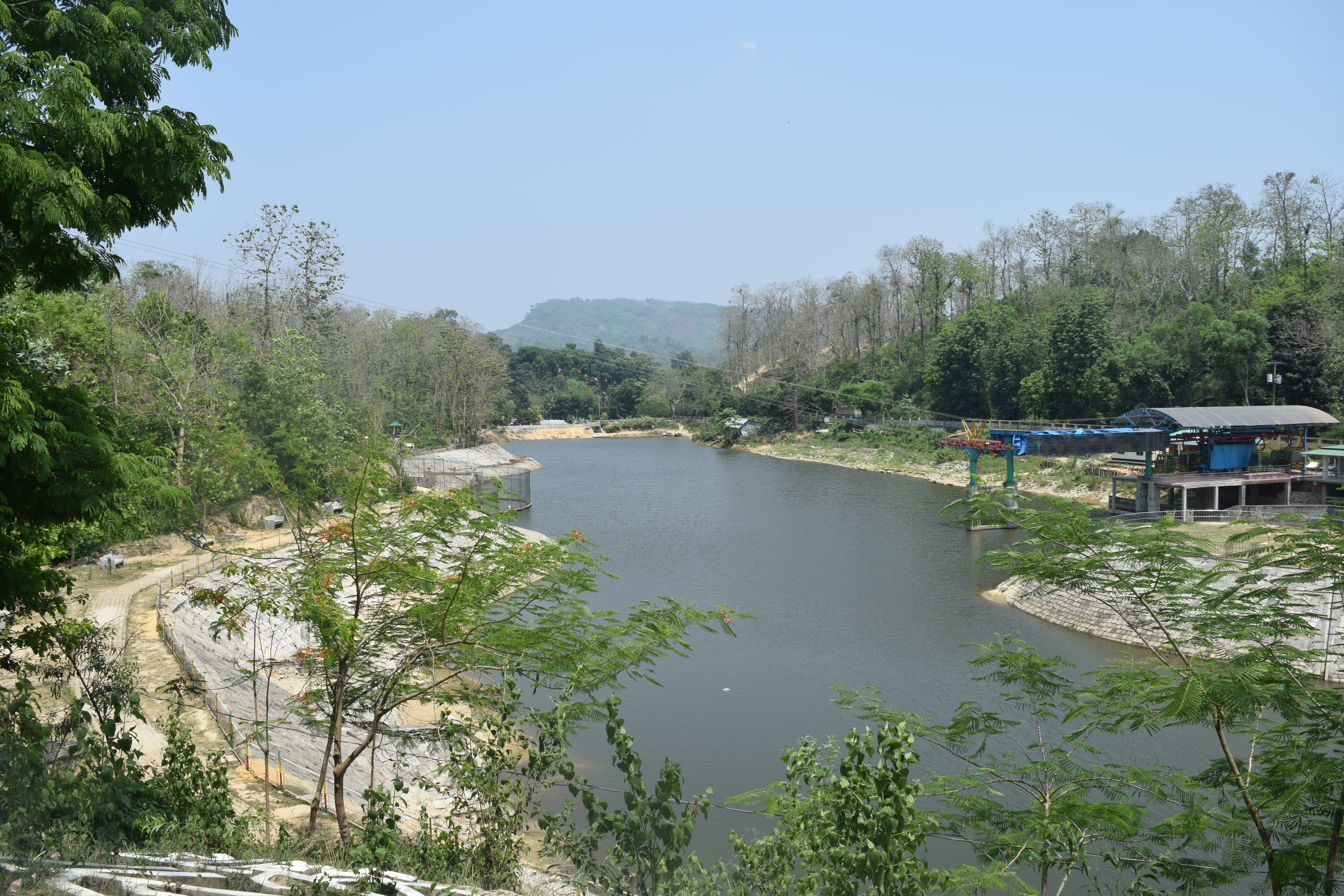

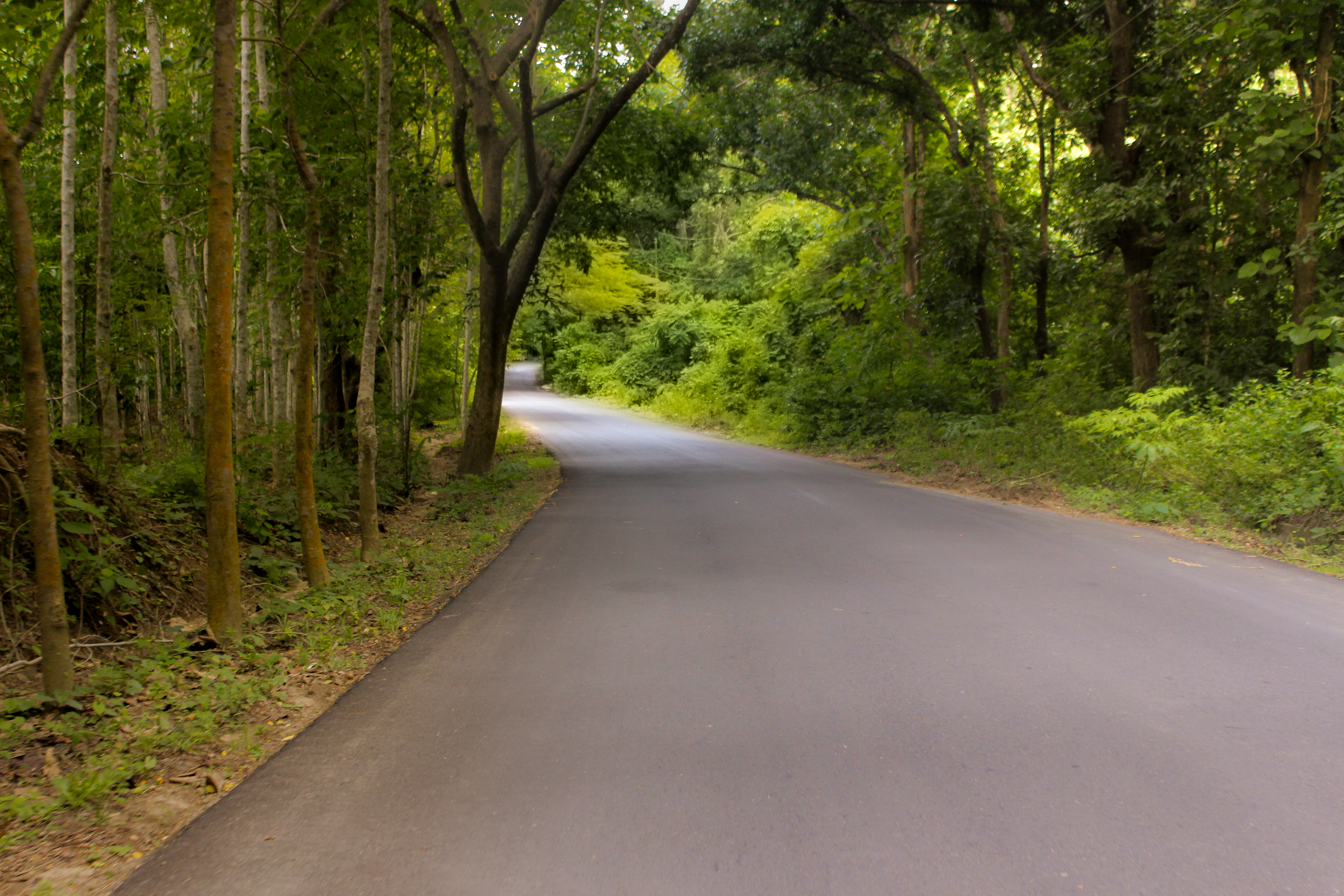

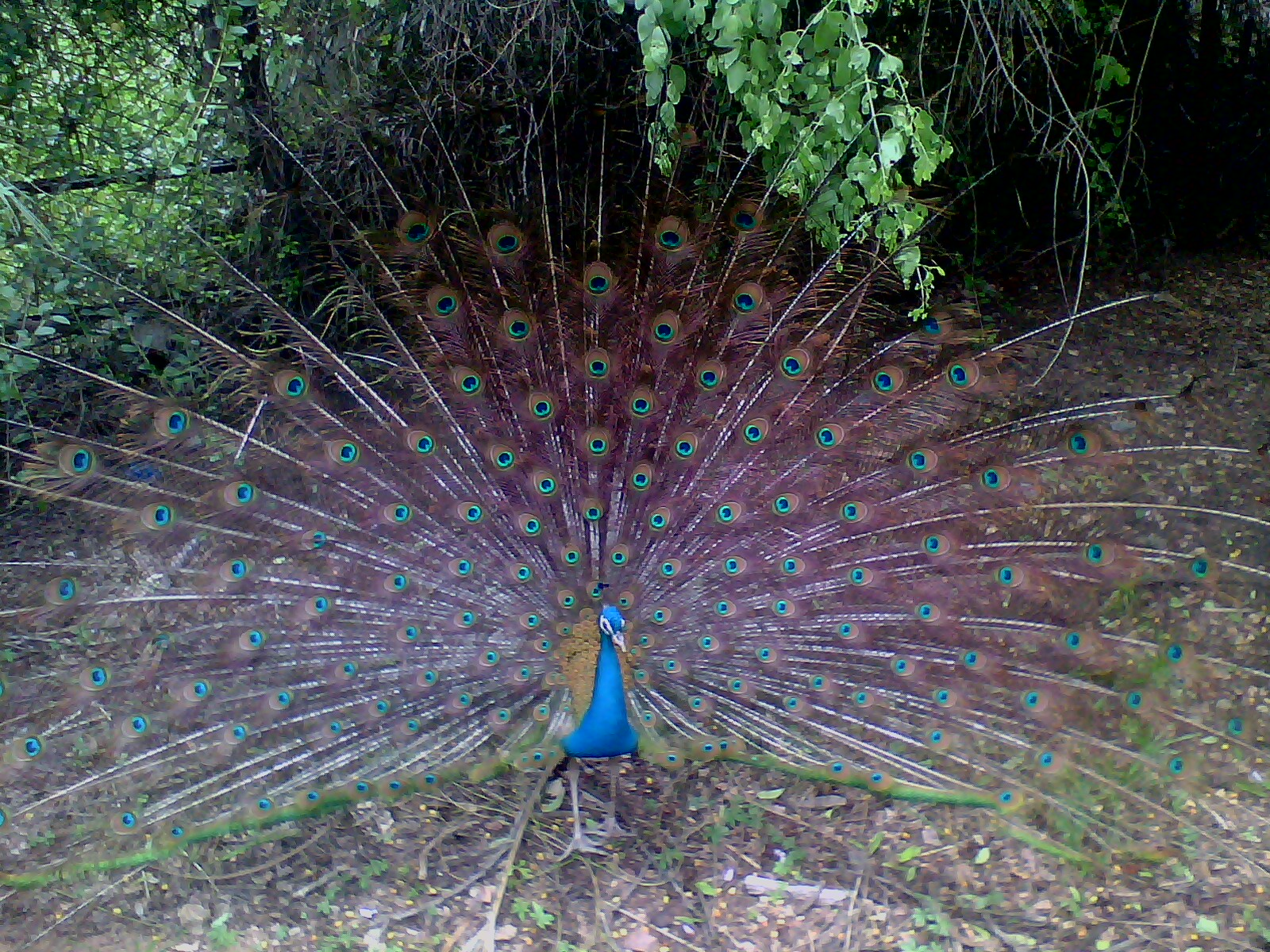

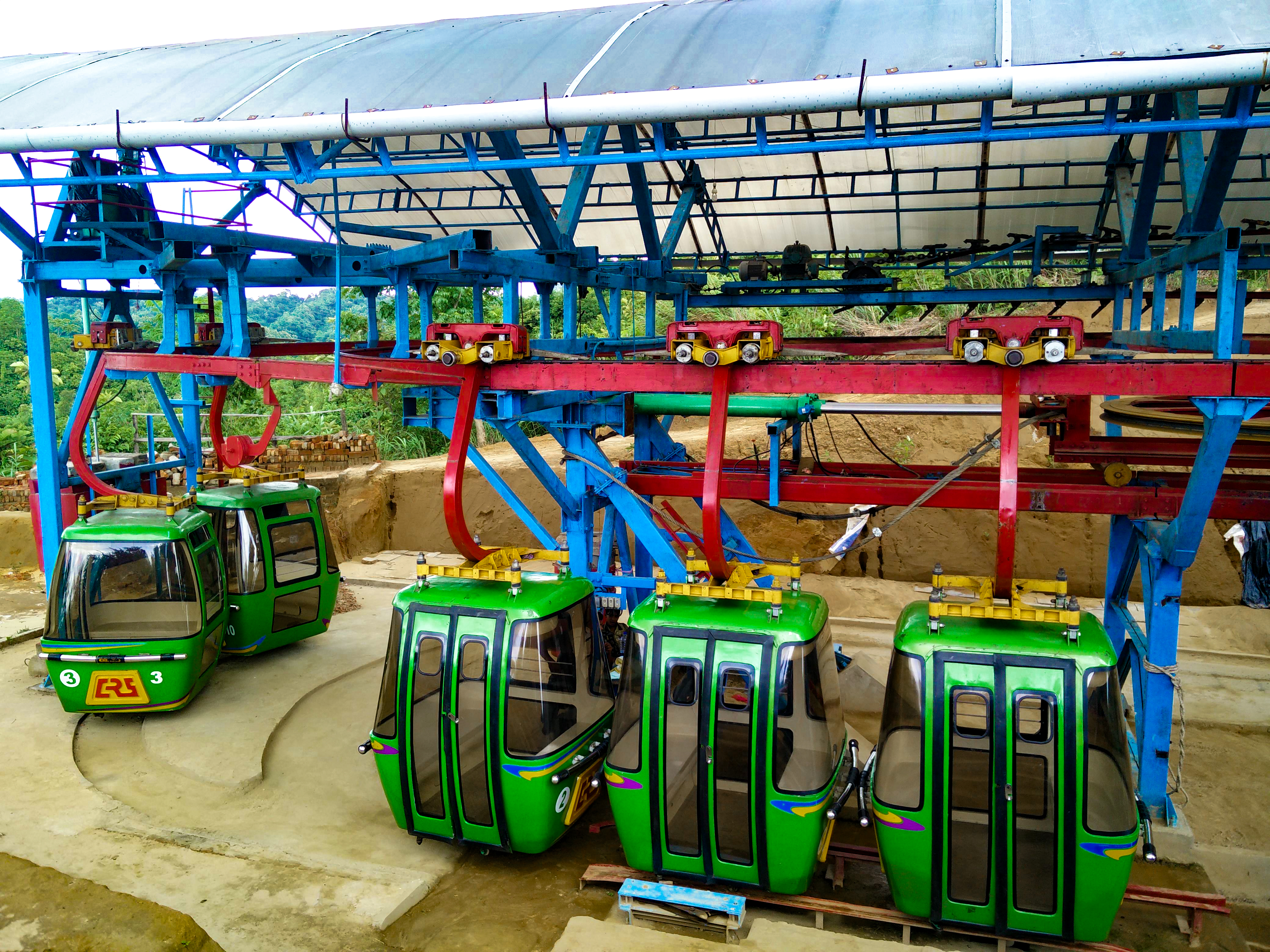

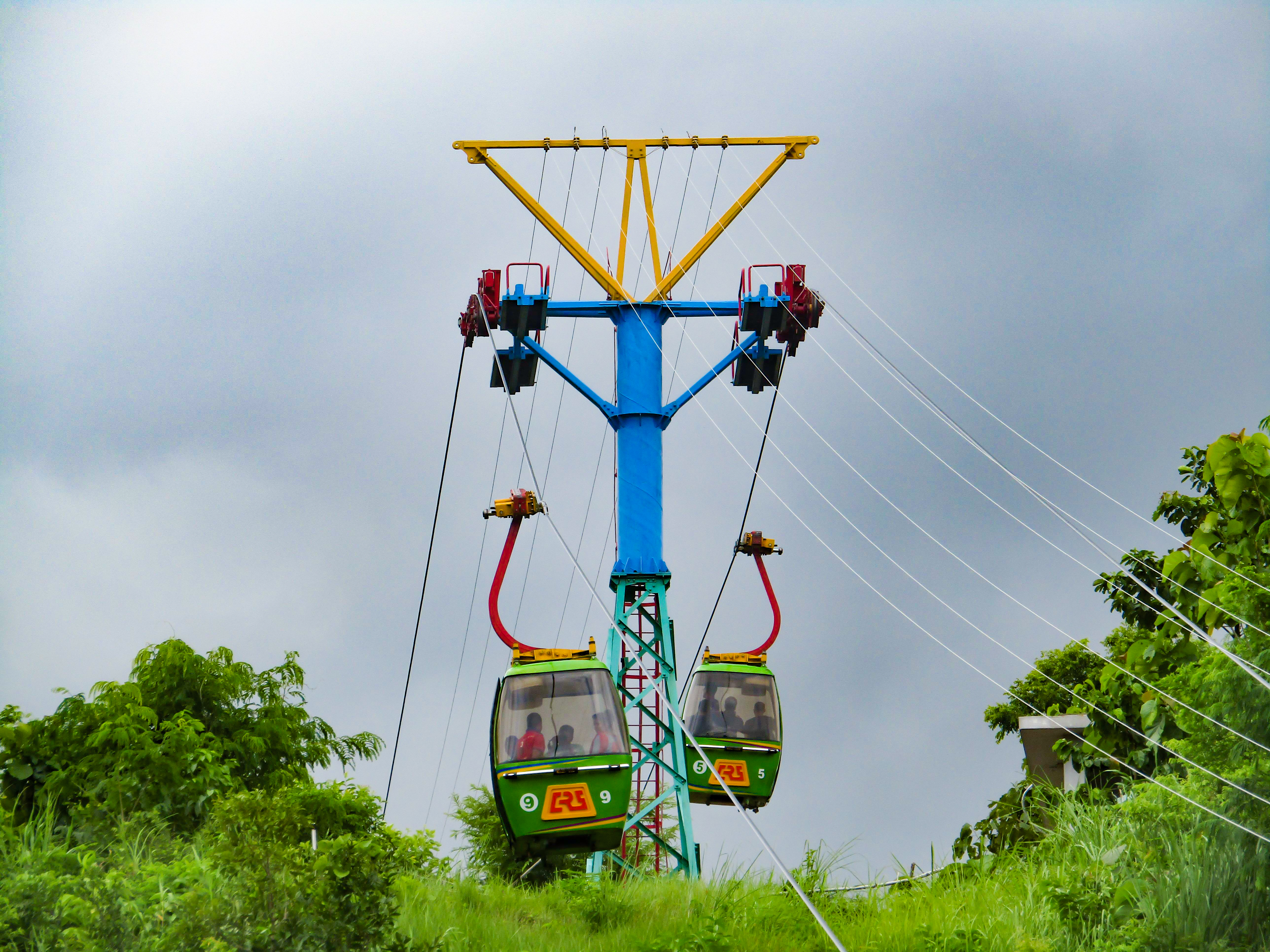

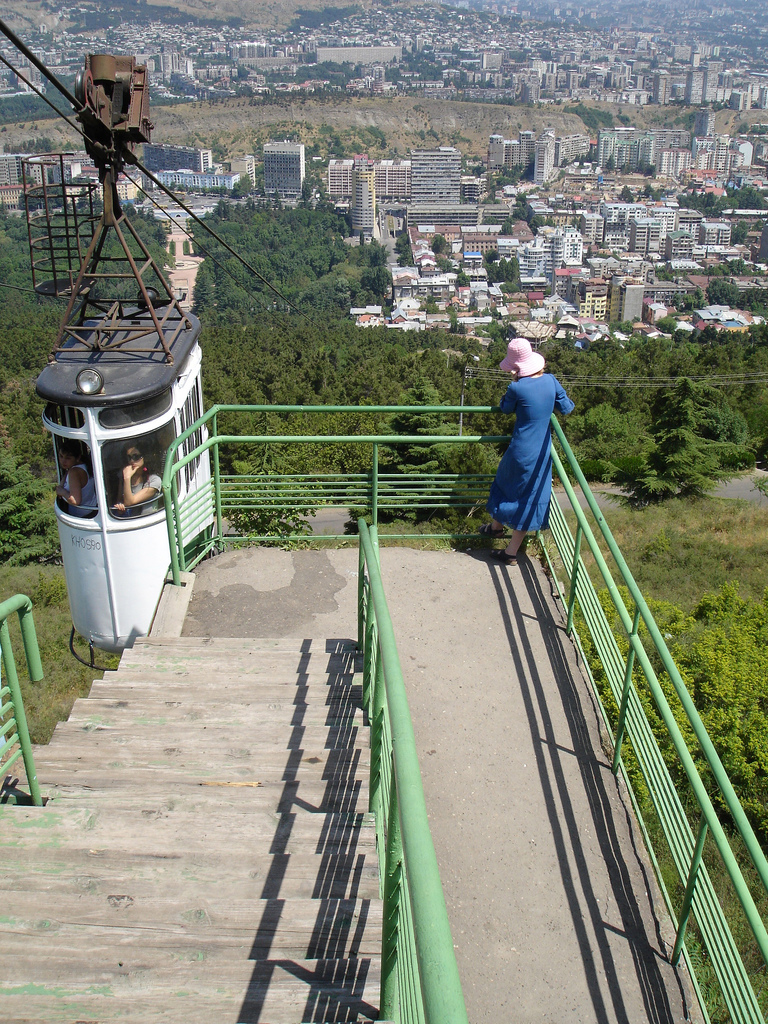

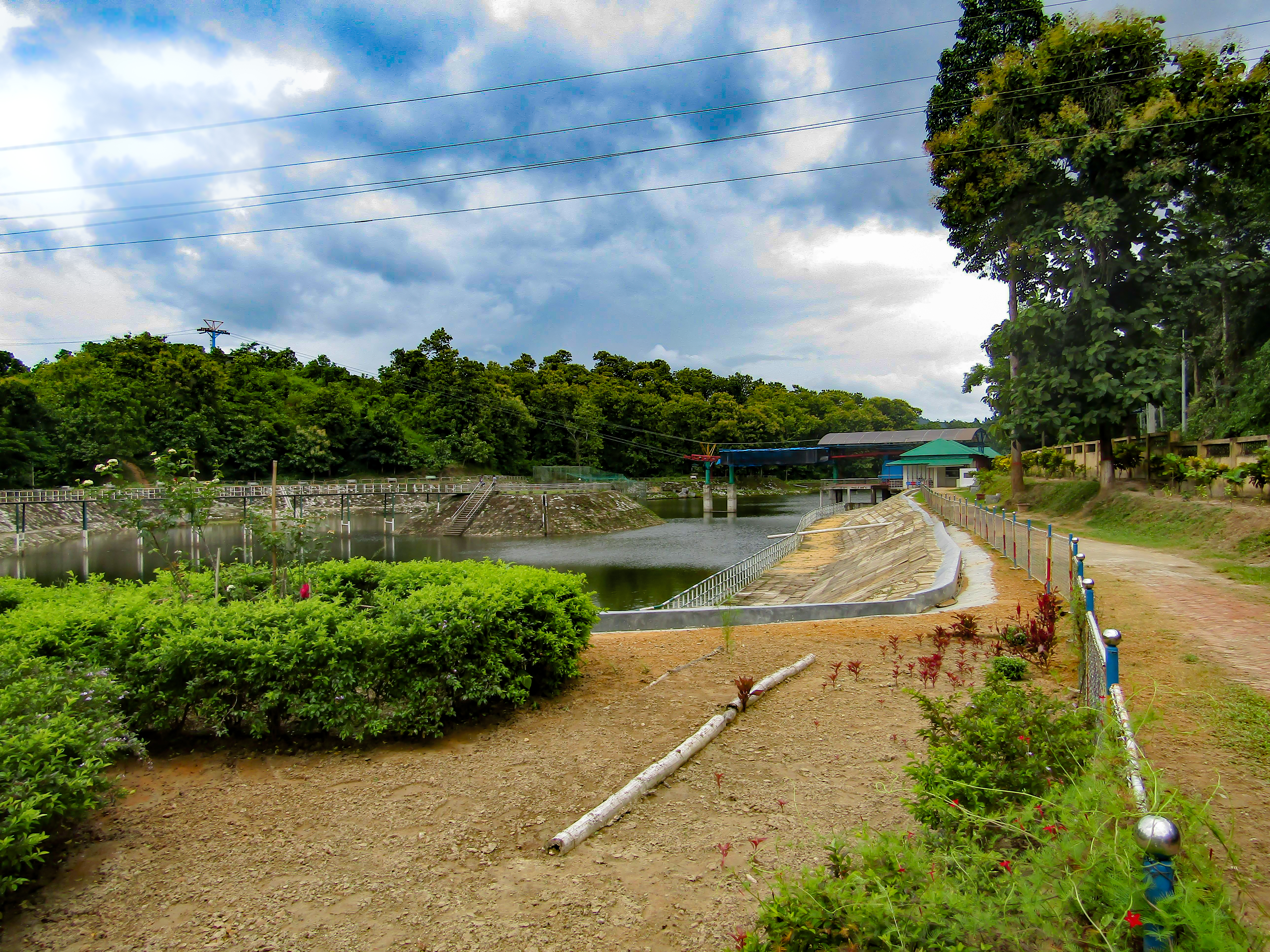
