= Bangladesh Veterinary Council =

Government regulatory agency

- Formation: 1982
- Headquarters: Dhaka, Bangladesh
- Region served: Bangladesh
- Official language: Bengali
- Website: bvc.gov.bd

Bangladesh Veterinary Council (Bengali: বাংলাদেশ ভেটেরিনারি কাউন্সিল) is a Bangladesh government regulatory agency under the Ministry of Fisheries and Livestock responsible for regulating veterinary education in Bangladesh and the registration of veterinarians. Prof.Dr. Md. Bahanur Rahman is the President of the council.

== History ==
Veterinarian students started the demand for an official body in 1961 and in 1974 formed the Bangladesh Veterinary Association to push their demand. Bangladesh Veterinary Council was established in 1982 through the passage of the Bangladesh Veterinary Council Act in the Parliament of Bangladesh. It was amended by the Bangladesh Veterinary Council Act in 2016. The council was further amended through the Bangladesh Veterinary Council Bill, 2019.
