= University Laboratory School and College =

School in Dhaka, Bangladesh

Coordinates: 23.7334°N 90.3902°E

- ইউনিভার্সিটি ল্যাবরেটরি স্কুল এন্ড কলেজ

Location
- DU Campus, Dhaka; Bangladesh

Information
- Type: school and college
- Established: 1964; 62 years ago
- Founder: Institute of Education and Research, University of Dhaka
- School board: Board of Intermediate and Secondary Education, Dhaka
- Principal: Md. Jamil Uddin
- Gender: co-ed
- Language: Bengali
- Campus: Urban
- Nickname: ULAB
- Website: www.ulabscdu.edu.bd

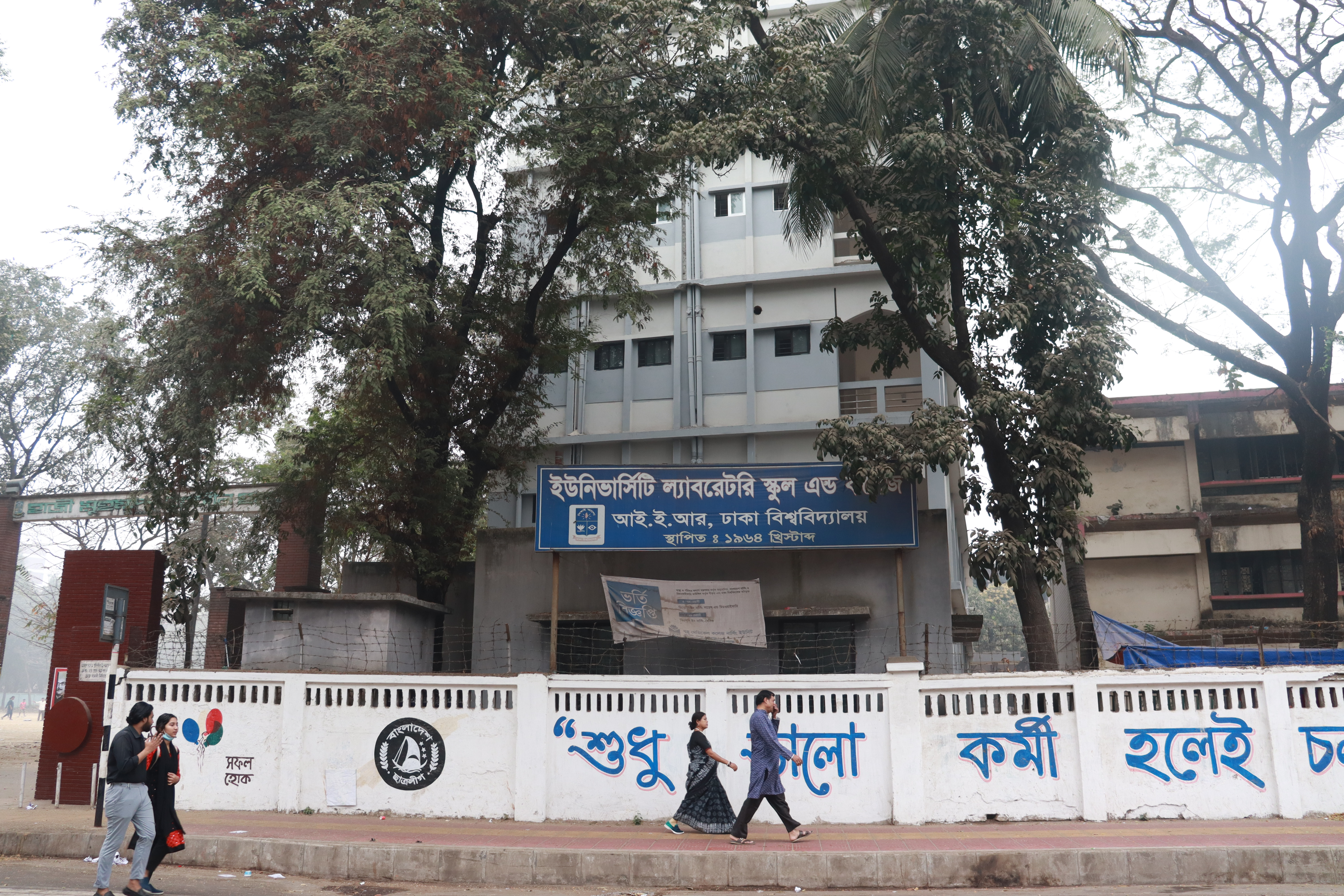
Campus building

University Laboratory School and College (Bengali: ইউনিভার্সিটি ল্যাবরেটরি স্কুল এন্ড কলেজ) is a school and college located in Dhaka, Bangladesh. It is on the campus of Institute of Education and Research, Dhaka University, Nilkhet Road, Dhaka and is under the institute's management. It is a part of Institute of Education and Research.

== History ==
University Laboratory School and College is a special type of educational institution operated by the Institute of Education and Research (IER) under the financial support of the University of Dhaka. The school began its journey in March 1964 under the leadership of Mrs. Gunning, an American teacher. In April 1965, it was upgraded from KG to the fifth grade, transforming into a primary school. That same year, the Home Room system was introduced.

The overall responsibility of the school was entrusted to Dr. Edgar E. Fielder, an American consultant and supervisor, who also served as the principal until 1965. He was assisted by Mrs. Gunning, Dr. Jackofron, and Dr. Ottis Coffey, three dedicated and visionary individuals.

In 1971, students from this institution appeared for the SSC examination for the first time. Later, in July 1975, the college section was introduced. From 2011, the institution started offering education in the English version, and currently, students from KG to the 10th grade receive education in this medium.

The children of university faculty members, officers, and employees are given priority admission to this institution. Through the collective efforts of students, teachers, parents, IER, and Dhaka University authorities.

At present, Md. Jamil Uddin serves as the acting principal of the institution.

== Notable alumni ==
- General Waker-Uz-Zaman, current army chief of the Bangladesh Army
- Mishuk Munier, media personality, cinematographer & journalist
- Lieutenant General Ataul Hakim Sarwar Hasan (Retd.), former chief of general staff of the Bangladesh Army
- Sohana Saba, actress, producer, screenwriter
