= Bangabandhu Memorial Hospital =

Coordinates: 22.3614°N 91.7974°E

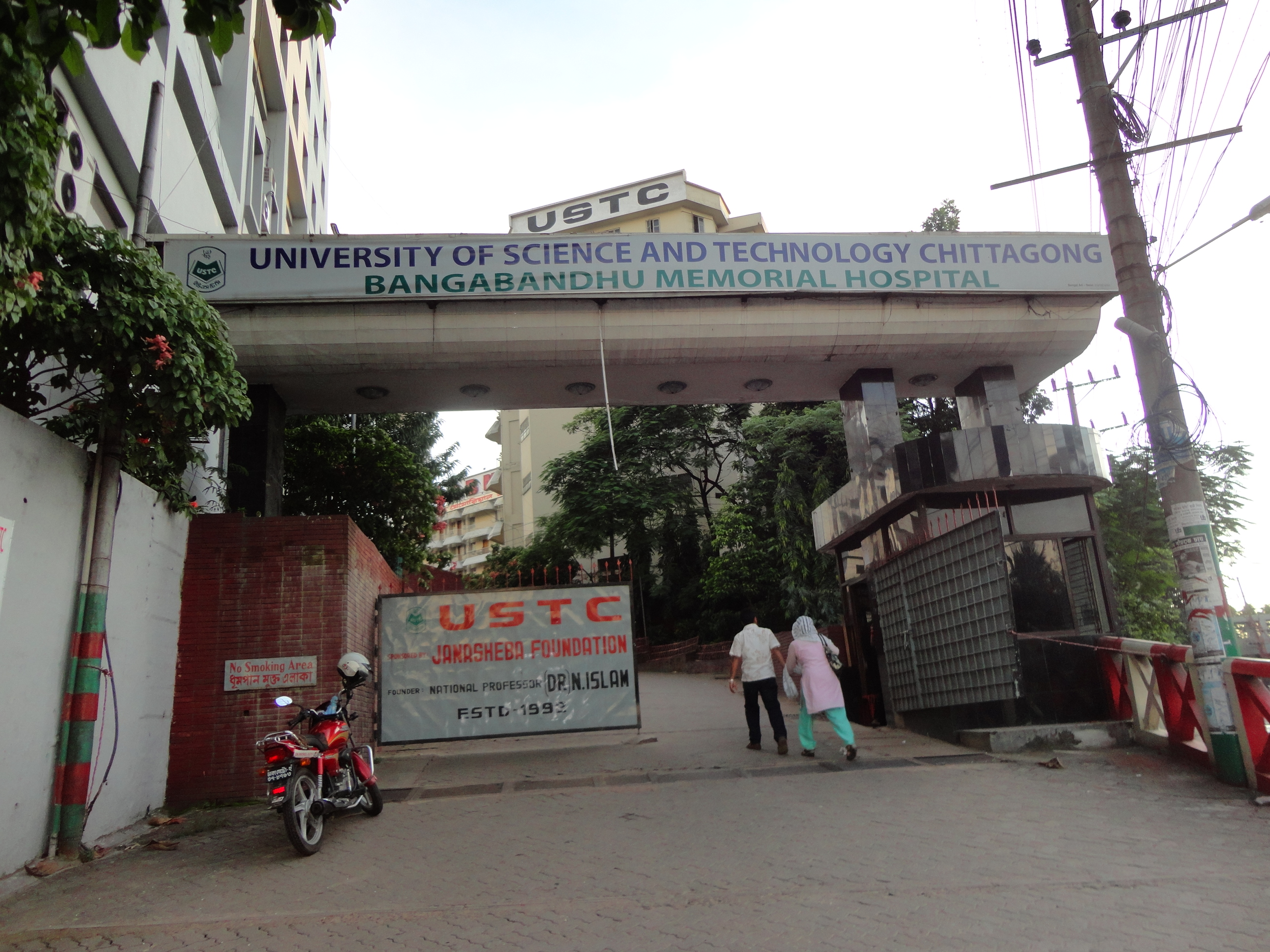
Entrance of Bangabandhu Memorial Hospital and USTC

Bangabandhu Memorial Hospital (BBMH) is the largest private hospital in Chittagong, Bangladesh. With 220 beds and 15 wards, it serves between 700 and 1,000 patients per day, about three-quarters of them as outpatients. Established in 1994 on the campus of the University of Science and Technology, Chittagong (USTC), it is run by the university and serves as the teaching hospital for its medical school, the Institute of Applied Health Science (IAHS). It is classified as one of the country's 23 "referral" hospitals, generally meaning one to which patients are referred by other healthcare entities because it is better equipped and employs medical specialists.

== History ==
A study conducted in 2012 found that the hospital sometimes burns untreated medical waste or mixes it with general waste and disposes of it in nearby Chittagong City Corporation dustbins. In 2013, the Department of Environment fined the hospital BDT 4,550,000 (US$58,700) for polluting the environment with liquid waste.

Protests by teachers, doctors, and other employees of the university over pay, work rules, and mismanagement, forced the suspension of all hospital services (other than emergency care) for four hours every day for three months in 2014. Protests by Bachelor of Medicine, Bachelor of Surgery (MBBS) students closed the hospital again in 2017 over the refusal of the Bangladesh Medical and Dental Council (BM&DC) to register USTC graduates to practice medicine in Bangladesh. The refusal came because USTC violated admission rules by enrolling 410 MBBS students in the 2011-12 batch, 414 in the 2012-13 batch, and 280 in the 2013-14 batch, when they were only authorized by the government to admit about 100 per batch.

The hospital is currently constructing a 500-bed extension.
