= National Gastroliver Institute & Hospital =

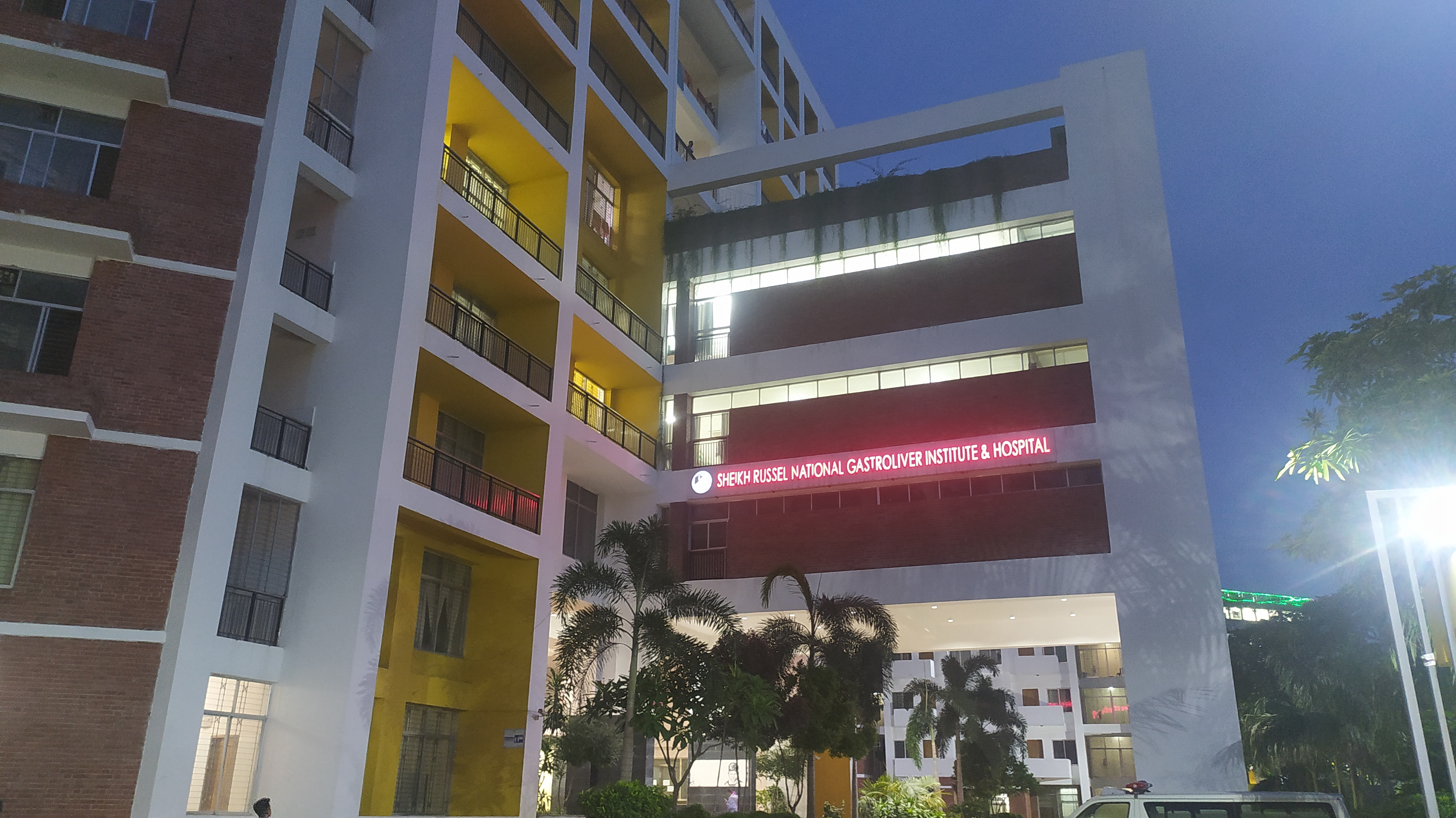
- Hospital Building

Geography
- Location: Mohakhali, Dhaka, Bangladesh
- Coordinates: 23.7762°N 90.4115°E

Organisation
- Type: Government

Services
- Beds: 250

History
- Opened: 31 October 2018

Links
- Website: www.nglih.gov.bd

National Gastroliver Institute & Hospital (Bengali: জাতীয় গ্যাস্ট্রোলিভার ইনস্টিটিউট ও হাসপাতাল) is a state supported research institute and hospital for Gastrointestinal diseases of the digestive system, liver, and pancreas located at Mohakhali, Dhaka, Bangladesh. Previously it was called Sheikh Russel National Gastroliver Institute & Hospital.

== History ==
Prime Minister Sheikh Hasina inaugurated the hospital on 31 October 2018. The work of the project started in October 2011 at a cost of about 216 crore 26 lakh taka. Initially, the hospital was named after Sheikh Russel. However, Sheikh Russell National Gastro Liver Institute and Hospital was renamed to National Gastroliver Institute & Hospital in November 2024 after the fall of the Sheikh Hasina-led Awami League government through the Student–People's uprising and Non-cooperation movement (2024).
