= Government Employee Hospital =

Government Employees Hospital
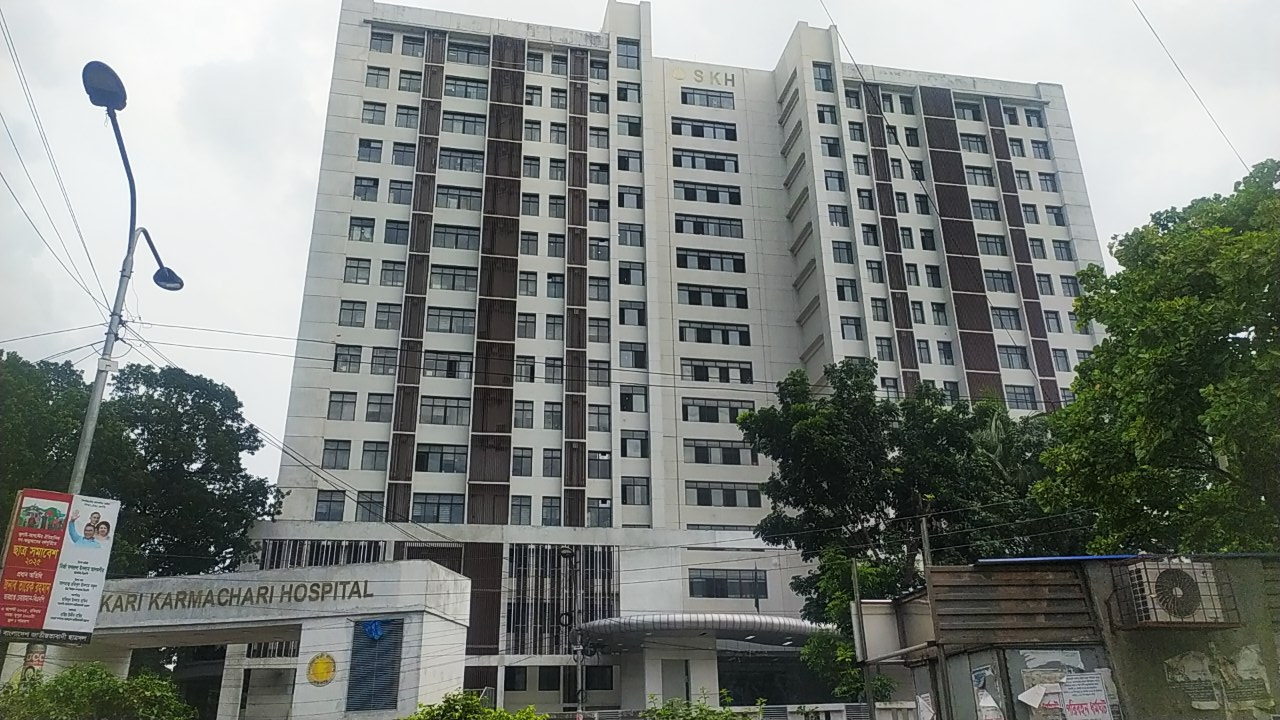

Geography
- Location: College Road, Fulbaria, Dhaka 1000
- Coordinates: 23.725222°N 90.405022°E

Organisation
- Care system: Government

Services
- Beds: 150

History
- Founded: 1907.

Links
- Website: skh.gov.bd

The Government Employees Hospital provided healthcare services to all government officers and employees. It is located in Dhaka. It is the core of a network of health facilities being established in eight divisions of Bangladesh with this aim. These facilities are being set up under the initiative of the Government of Bangladesh and will be operated under the supervision of the Ministry of Public Administration. Through these hospitals, all government employees of Bangladesh will receive medical services. Each of these hospitals will be named as a Divisional Government Employees Hospital.

For the management of all Government Employees Hospitals in Bangladesh, a Director General (DG) and an Additional Director General (ADG) will be appointed.

== History ==
The hospital's capacity was increased from 50 to 150 beds in 2014, a year after the Ministry took over its administration. Prior to that, the Ministry of Health had been overseeing the hospital since it was converted from a railway hospital into the Sarkari Karmachari Hospital in 1978.
