= National Institute of Mental Health and Hospital =

Government mental health organization in Bangladesh

Coordinates: 23.7721°N 90.3680°E

National Institute of Mental Health & Hospital

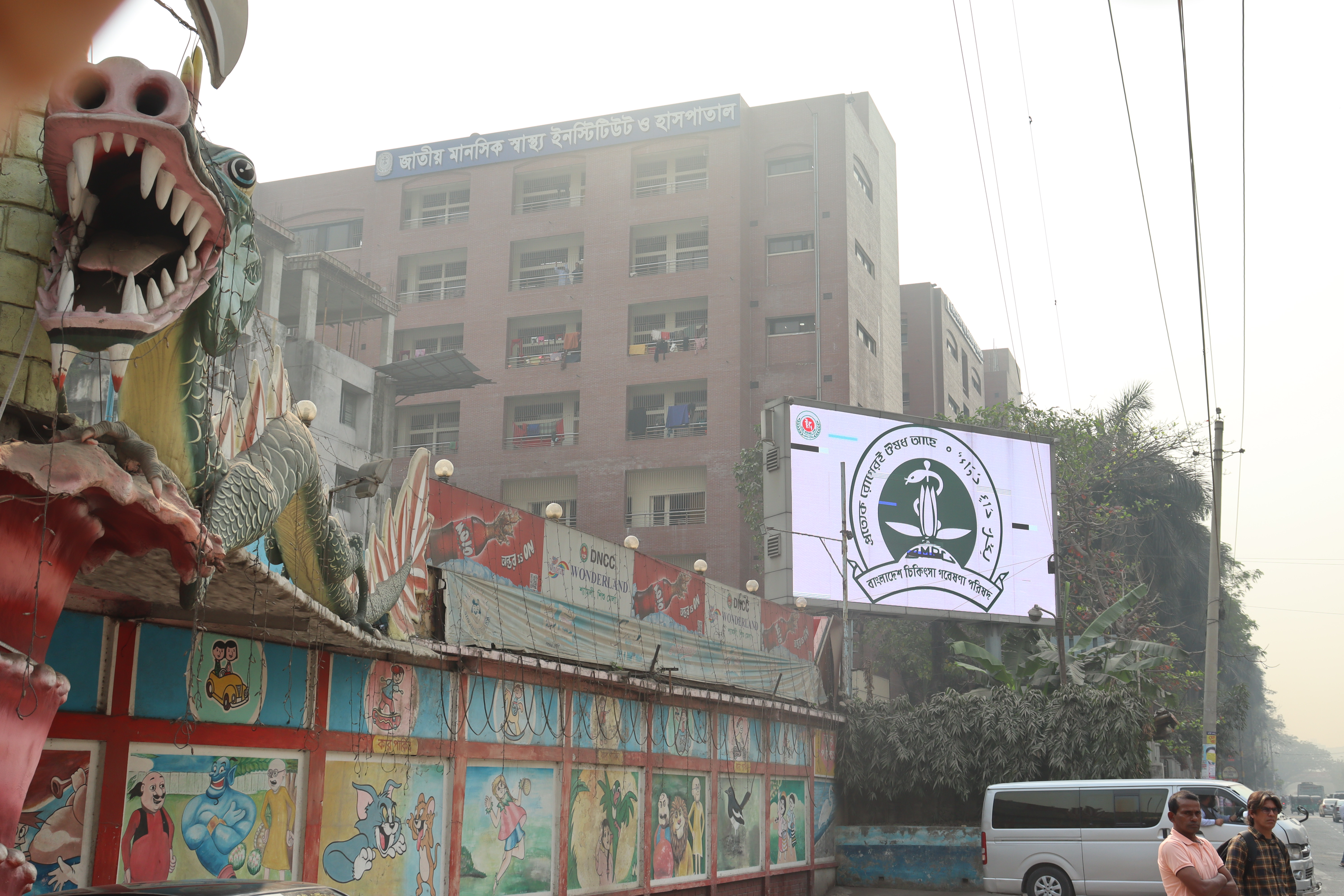

Agency overview
- Formed: February 1981; 45 years ago
- Headquarters: Sher-e-Bangla Nagar, Dhaka, Bangladesh
- Agency executives: Bidhan Ranjan Roy Poddar, Director; Mohammad Tariqul Alam, Deputy Director
- Parent department: Ministry of Health
- Website: nimh.gov.bd

The National Institute of Mental Health and Hospital (Bengali: জাতীয় মানসিক স্বাস্থ্য ইনস্টিটিউট ও হাসপাতাল) is one of the institutes and centers that make under the Ministry of Health and Family Welfare. It is the only government mental hospital and mental health institution in Dhaka.

== History ==
It was established in 1981 as a mental health training organization of Shaheed Suhrawardy Medical College & Hospital. Two years after its establishment, the government decided to move it to a separate building as a separate entity. After that, the journey of the independent institution started in 1986 at Sir Salimullah Medical College. The 50-bed organization was called the Institute of Mental Health and Research. In 1993, the address of the institute was changed and it was brought to Dhaka Medical College. On 19 October 1992, the facility was relocated to its current building at its current address and renamed this 100-bed facility.

All its doctors and staff went on strike in 2020 in protest of the arrest of the organization's registrar. The registrar was arrested on charges of corruption and brokerage.

== Specifications ==
Its hospital has 400 beds. The building of the institute is built on 7243.873 square meter land. The hospital has 44 regular doctors. The 184-member institute has divisions named Adult Psychiatry, Pediatrics & Development Psychiatry, Adult Psychiatry & Community Psychiatry, Radiology, Anesthesiology, Pathology and Social Welfare. There is also a special section for children. The institute also provides training in mental health. There is a system to provide low cost medical services.
