= Shaheed Suhrawardy Medical College =

- শহীদ সোহরাওয়ার্দী মেডিকেল কলেজ
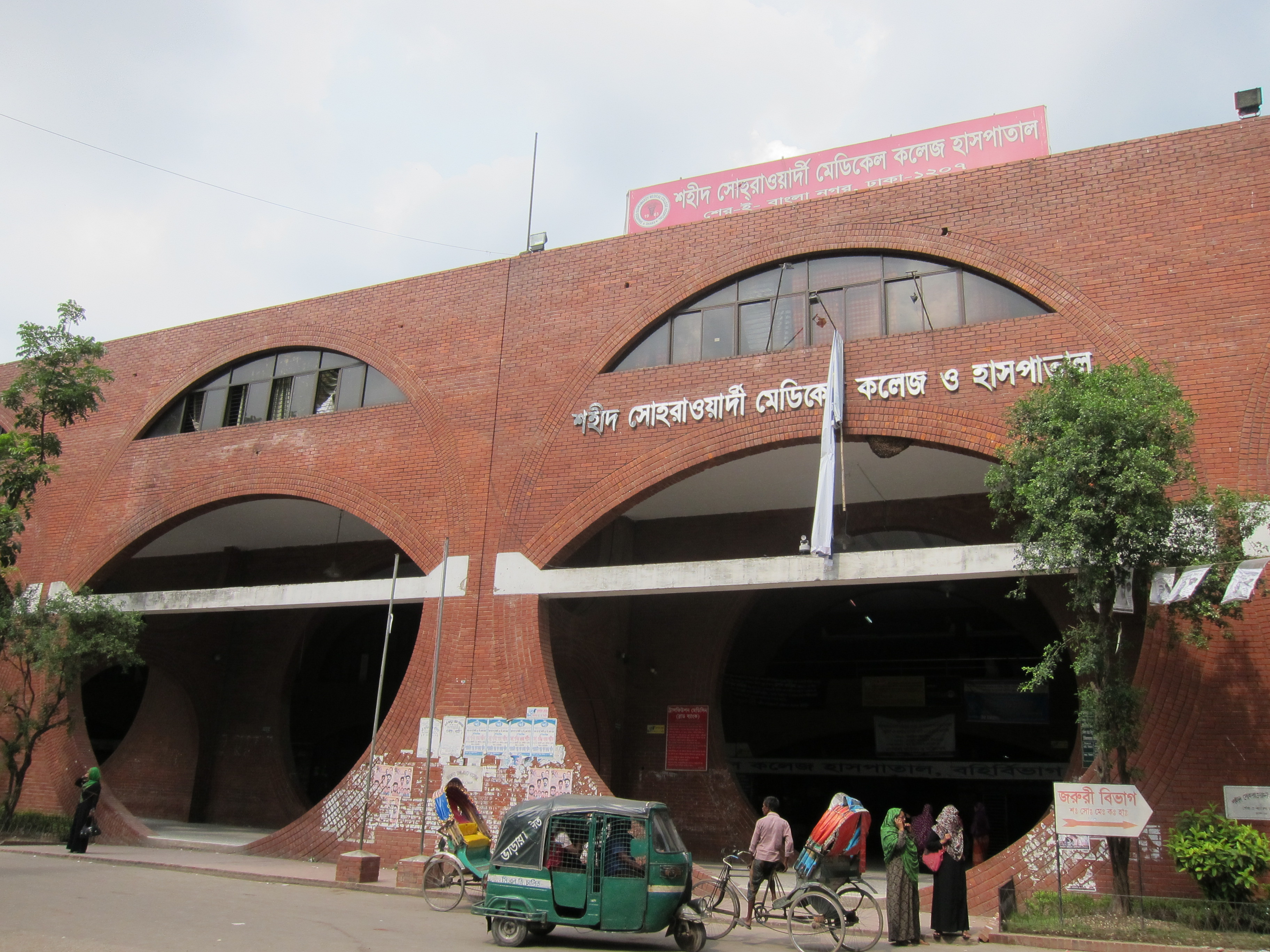
- Shaheed Suhrawardy Medical College
- Former name: Begum Khaleda Zia Medical College (2006 – 2009)
- Type: Public medical school
- Established: 1963 as Ayub Central Hospital and 2006 as Medical College
- Academic affiliations: University of Dhaka
- Principal: Saki Md Jakiul Alam
- Director: Mohammed Shehab Uddin
- Students: 900
- Location: Sher-e-Bangla Nagar, Dhaka, Bangladesh; 23°46′6.50″N 90°22′18.24″E
- Campus: Urban
- Language: English

Shaheed Suhrawardy Medical College & Hospital (ShSMC) is a public medical college and hospital located in Dhaka, the capital city of Bangladesh. It was named after Huseyn Shaheed Suhrawardy.

== History ==
Shaheed Suhrawardy Hospital was established in 1963 as Ayub Central Hospital in Sher-e-Bangla Nagar, Dacca, East Pakistan. The hospital building was designed by architect Louis I Kahn.

The Bangladeshi government decided on 5 September 2005 to turn Shaheed Suhrawardy Hospital into a medical college. Educational activities in the college began on 6 May 2006. In the inauguration ceremony the then health minister, Khandakar Mosharof Hossain started the educational activities officially. Originally, the medical college was known as Begum Khaleda Zia Medical College and had 100 students. However, on 1 June 2009, the name of the medical college was changed to Shaheed Suhrawardy Medical College.

== Campus ==
There are separate hostels for boys and girls. Both the hostels were established and opened in June 2008. Both of the hostels are six storied & have catering services and hall rooms. Canteen facilities are available with food items. The new college building has been inaugurated by ex-Prime Minister Sheikh Hasina on 17 January 2012. Shaheed Suhrawardy Medical College is affiliated with the University of Dhaka. This college is directly governed by the Bangladesh Medical and Dental Council – under the Ministry of Health.

Since 2025, two new hostels—one for boys and one for girls—have been opened to accommodate the growing number of students. The original hostels were designed to house approximately 100 students per session, whereas the current MBBS intake exceeds 200 students per session, alongside a separate BDS program. Despite the addition of new hostels, living conditions remain overcrowded.

== Hospital ==
Shaheed Suhrawardy Medical College and Hospital

Geography
- Location: Dhaka, Bangladesh

Services
- Beds: 1350

History
- Former name: Ayub Central Hospital
- Opened: 1963

Links
- Website: shsmc.college.gov.bd (College) www.shsmc.gov.bd (College - Retired) www.shsmch.gov.bd (Hospital)
- Lists: Hospitals in Bangladesh

== Academics ==
Shaheed Suhrawardy Medical College is affiliated with the University of Dhaka. The students receive an MBBS degree from the University of Dhaka after completion of five years of study and passing the Final Professional Examination. The students receive BDS degree from the same university. This college is directly governed by the Bangladesh Medical and Dental Council – an affiliate of the Ministry of Health.

Admission test is held under the Ministry of Health for admission in all the government medical colleges. Students selected in the test are admitted here on the basis of merit and choice.

=== Undergraduate level ===
As of June 2025, the 20th MBBS batch and the 14th BDS batch have commenced their classes. The MBBS batches are identified by the initial "Sh" (e.g., Sh-20), while the BDS batches use "ShD" (e.g., ShD-14).

MBBS Curriculum

First Phase

- Anatomy
- Physiology
- Biochemistry

Second Phase

- Pharmacology & Therapeutics
- Forensic Medicine & Toxicology

Third Phase

- Community Medicine
- Pathology
- Microbiology

Fourth Phase

- Medicine, Pediatrics & Allied Subjects
- Surgery, Orthopedics, Ophthalmology, Otolaryngology (ENT) and Allied Subjects

BDS Curriculum

First Phase

- Sub 1 : Anatomy & Dental Anatomy
- Sub 2 : Physiology, Biochemistry & Science of Dental Materials

Second Phase

- Sub 3 : General & Dental Pharmacology
- Sub 4 : Pathology & Microbiology

Third Phase

- Sub 5 : Medicine
- Sub 6 : Surgery
- Sub 7 : Periodontology & Oral Pathology

Fourth Phase

- Sub 8 : Oral & Maxillofacial Surgery
- Sub 9 : Conservative Dentistry & Endodontics
- Sub 10: Prosthodontics
- Sub 11: Orthodontics & Dentofacial Orthopedics
- Sub 12: Pedodontics & Dental Public Health

=== Post graduate level ===
Various postgraduate courses are offered at the institution, including Diploma, MD, MS, and FCPS programs. It serves as an important center for learning and clinical training for postgraduate trainees.

== Principals ==
- 1st principal: A.K.M. Azizul Huq (2006–2008)
- 2nd principal: Abdul Kader Khan (2008–2009)
- 3rd principal: ABM Muksudul Alam (2009–2024)
- 4th principal: Saki Md Jakiul Alam (2024–present)

== Student life ==
=== Academic facilities and teaching structure ===
Lectures are conducted six days a week, with Friday as the only weekly holiday. The college has multiple lecture galleries, some of which are equipped with air conditioning. Notable venues include:

- Lecture Gallery 3 and Lecture Gallery 4, located on the second floor of the college building,
- The Auditorium and Multipurpose Room on the fourth floor of the college building,
- The Hospital Gallery on the fifth floor of the hospital building.

Most departments also have their own classrooms, which vary in quality; some are well-furnished while others are simpler. These departmental classrooms are used for tutorial and practical classes.

From the third year onward, students attend ward classes, OT classes, evening classes as part of their clinical training.

Students undergo regular assessment through daily item examinations up to the third phase. Some subjects include card finals and term final examinations, culminating in professional examinations at the end of each phase. Clinical subjects also include ward finals and block finals.

In addition, students participate in various academic tours, such as day tours, RFST (Residential Field Site Training), study tours, and rag tours, organized according to their phase and subjects.

=== Libraries and reading rooms ===
There are two main libraries: one located on the first floor of the college building and the other on the fifth floor of the hospital building. The college library is open to all but access is primarily prioritized according to seniority. The hospital library serves as the intern library. Additionally, many departments maintain their own libraries for teaching staff and trainees.

=== Mosque ===
There are multiple mosques located on the campus. Notable examples include a mosque on the third floor of the college building, another on the first floor of the hospital building beside the canteen, and the prominent ShSMC Boys' Hostel Jame Masjid.

=== Extracurricular activities ===
Each and every year the students celebrate the national days by performing cultural programme. The students also celebrate the Iftar Party, Swarasti Puja, Pahela Baisakh, Indoor Games Competition in the college campus.

=== Voluntary organizations ===
- No official cultural and political organization
- Sandhani – Shaheed Suhrawardy Medical College Unit
- Shaheed Suhrawardy Medical College Debating Club
- Shaheed Suhrawardy Medical College Photography Club
- Somaz Sheba Protishthan (Bengali: সমাজ সেবা প্রতিষ্ঠান)
- Project Heal

=== Previous organizations ===
==== SpHuRoN ====
SpHuRoN was initially established as a non-political organization. Over time, it became involved in the politics of the Awami League's student wing, particularly concerning student hall seat distribution and other campus political activities.

There were numerous complaints from students alleging that senior members engaged in misconduct, including verbal abuse, harassment, forcing juniors to perform personal errands, organizing late-night meetings, and instances of physical assault.

In July 2024, the organization faced serious accusations of threatening and assaulting students to prevent them from participating in the anti-discrimination movement. It was also alleged that members attacked students who chose to join the movement.

Following the fall of the Sheikh Hasina regime on 5 August 2024, SpHuRoN was disbanded.

==== dé béats ====
dé béats was another group that identified itself as a non-political organization. However, it faced similar accusations as those directed at SpHuRoN, including allegations of verbal abuse, harassment, forcing juniors to perform personal chores, organizing late-night meetings, and instances of physical assault.

The group was also dissolved following the fall of the Sheikh Hasina regime on 5 August 2024.

=== Currently operating organizations (unofficial) ===
==== Tablig Jamat ====
Tablig Jamat has an active presence in ShSMC, primarily focusing on encouraging students and staff to engage in religious practices and spiritual development. Though short membered, they organize regular taalim (study circles), bayan (lectures) to invite others toward Islamic teachings. Their activities are generally non-political and centered on personal reform and communal prayer.

==== Dawah Society of ShSMC ====
The group identifies itself as a society dedicated to spreading the dawah (invitation) of Islam. Despite having relatively few members, it organized iftar programs and Eid special buffets for examinees staying on campus during Eid-ul-Azha in 2025, among other activities.

Some have accused the group of having political affiliations with religious political parties; however, these claims remain unconfirmed.

== Student participations ==
MBBS students at ShSMC actively engage in research activities and participate in various medical student-led forums and conferences around the world, showcasing their academic contributions on international platforms.

The college's debate club, although lacking a formal organizational structure, has achieved notable successes over the years, earning recognition in several competitions.

In addition, ShSMC was awarded first prize in the 'Top Medical College Hospital' category by the Directorate General of Health Services (DGHS) for the third consecutive time in 2019, highlighting its consistent excellence in hospital services and management.

== Gallery ==
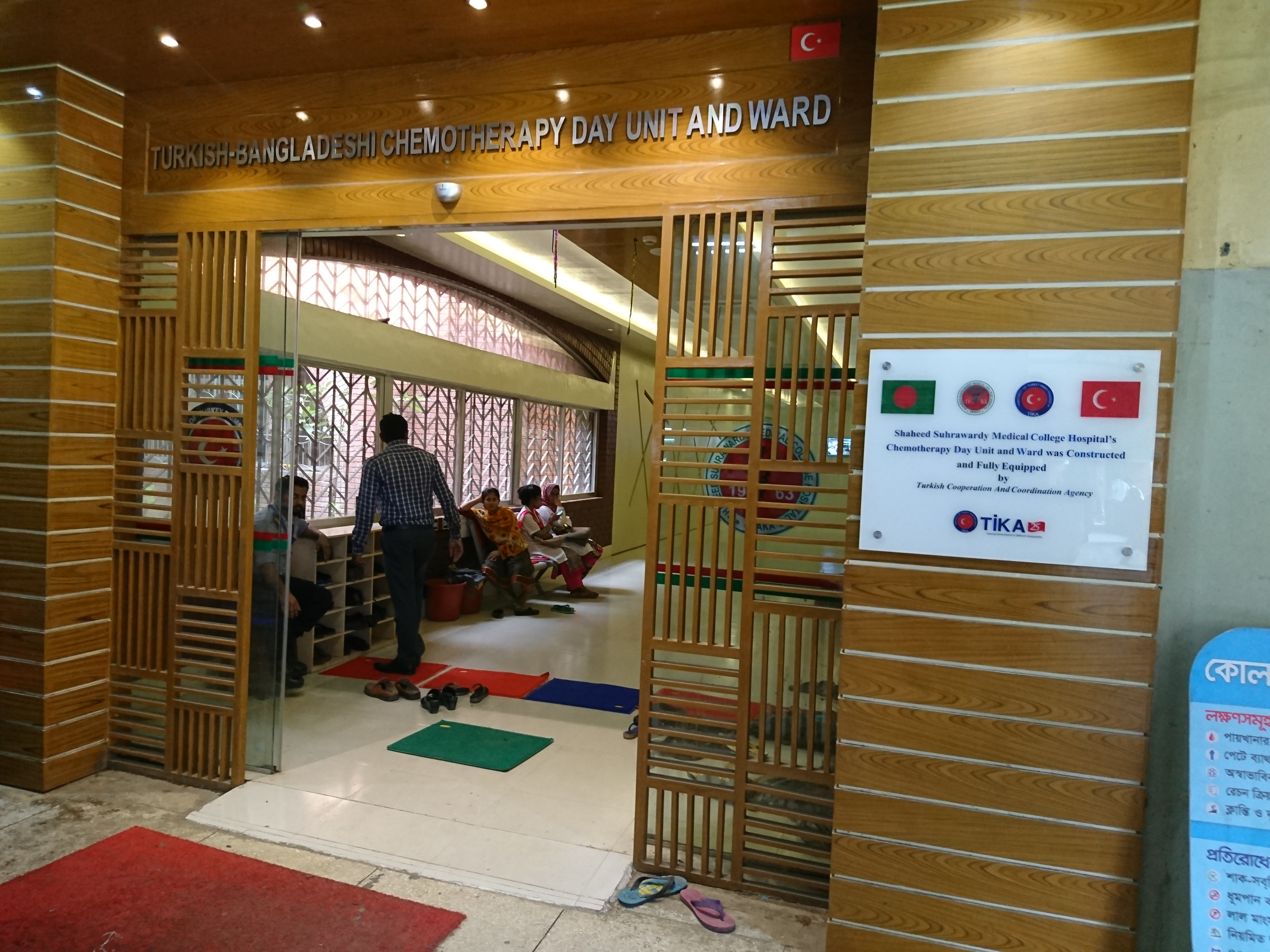
Turkish Bangladeshi Chemotherapy Day Unit And Ward

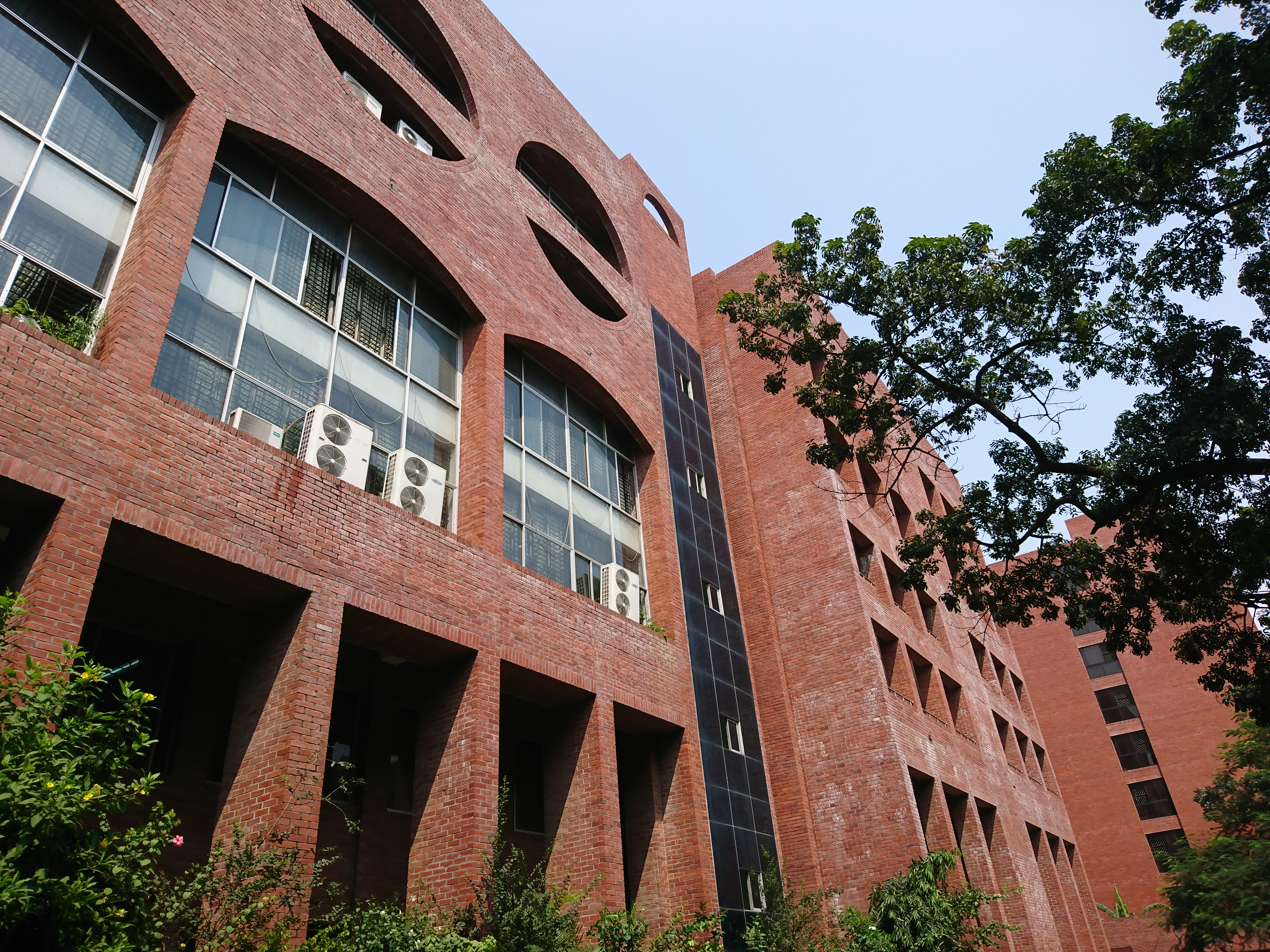
ShSMC academic building

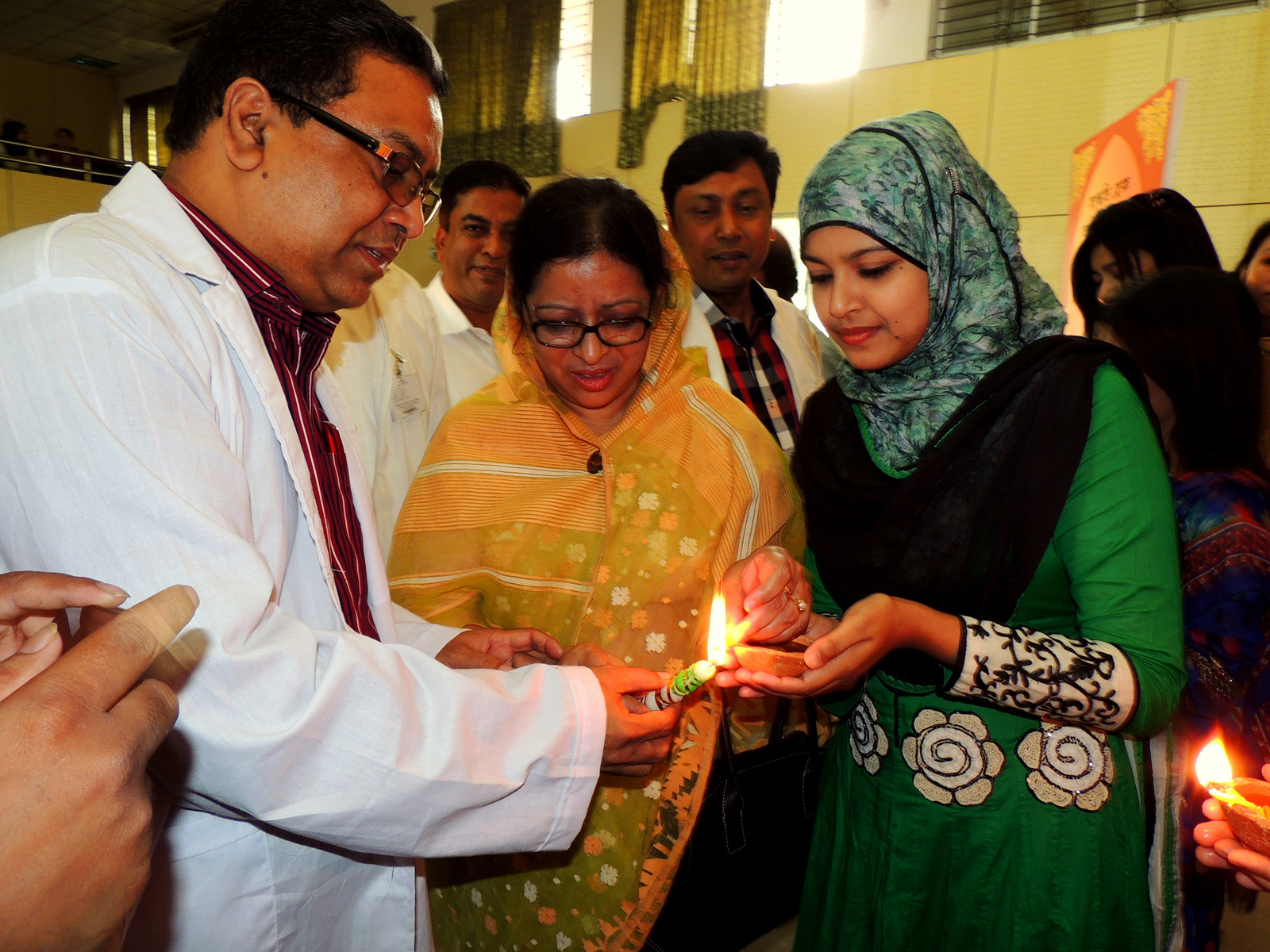
Cultural Week 2014

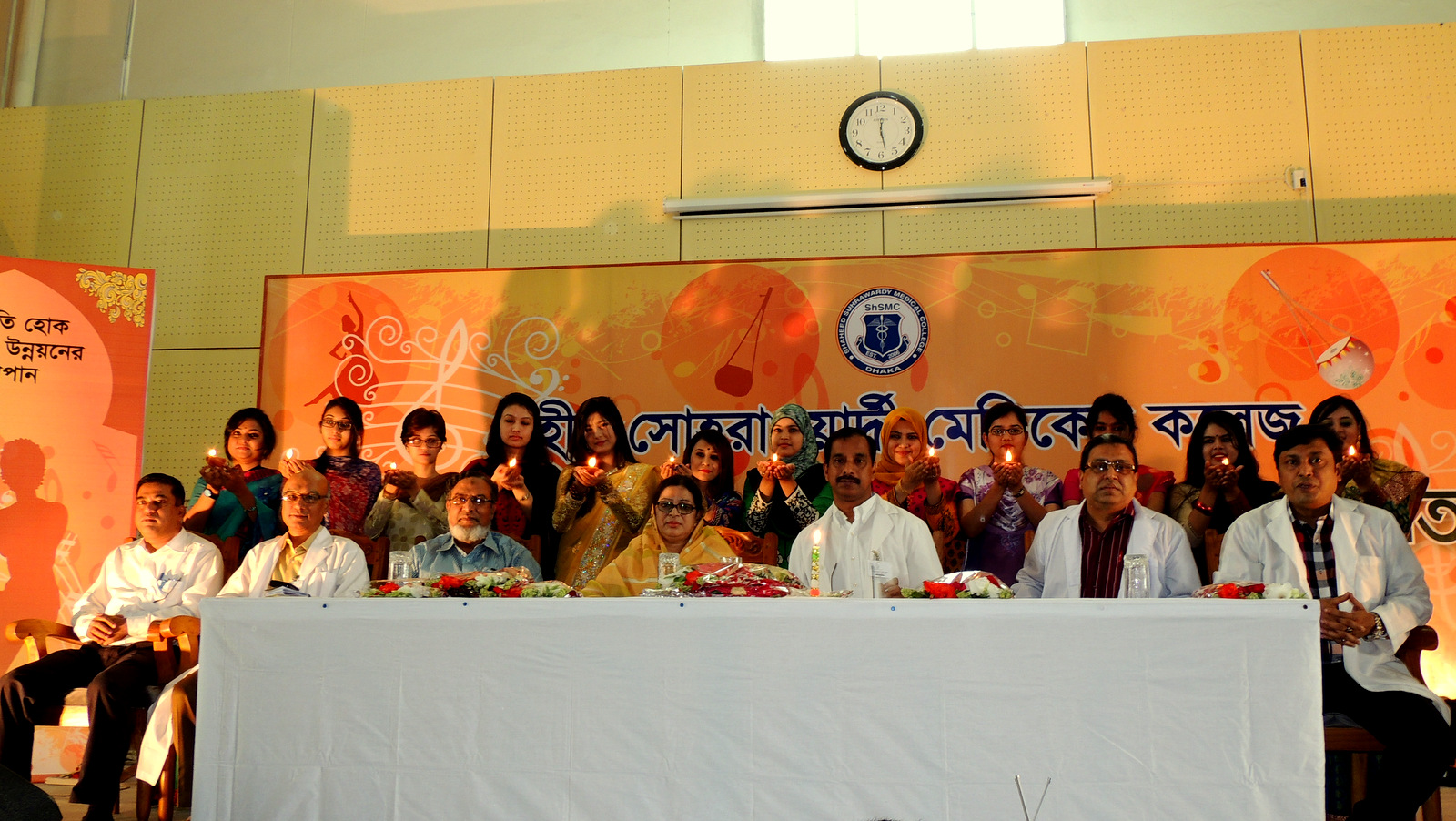
Cultural Week 2014

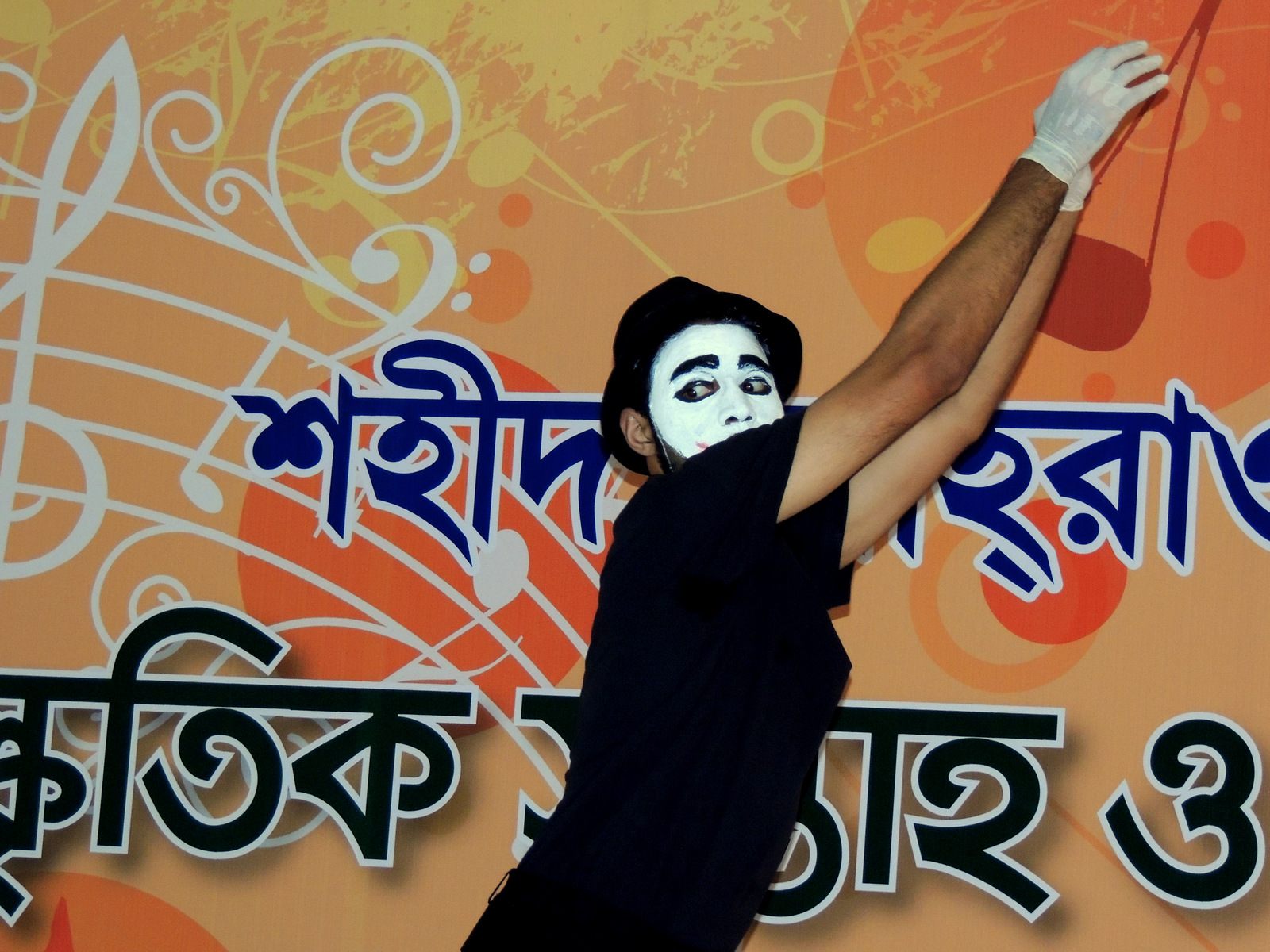
Cultural Week 2014

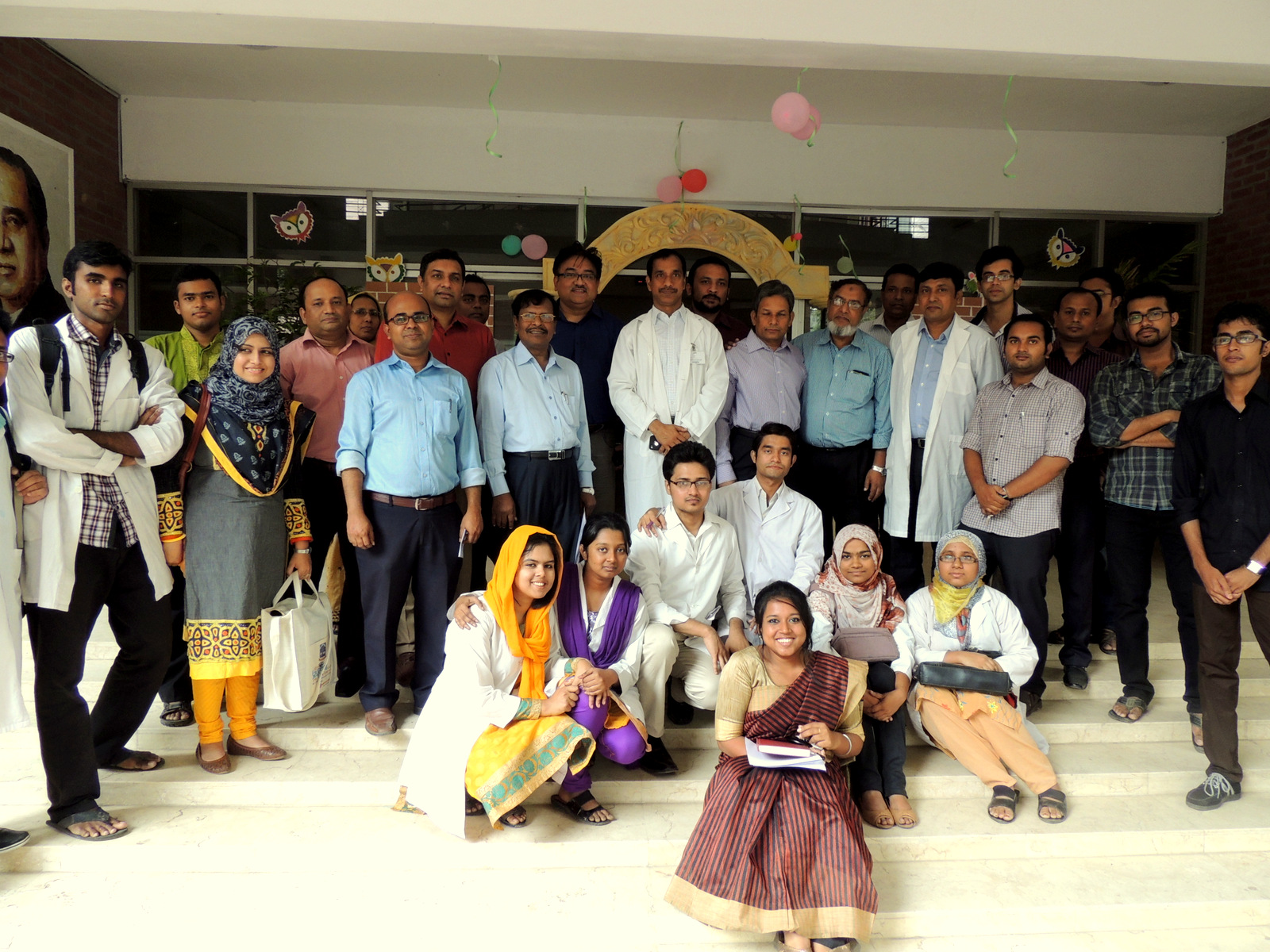
Cultural Week 2014

== See also ==
- List of medical colleges in Bangladesh
- Sir Salimullah Medical College
