= National Institute of Kidney Diseases & Urology =

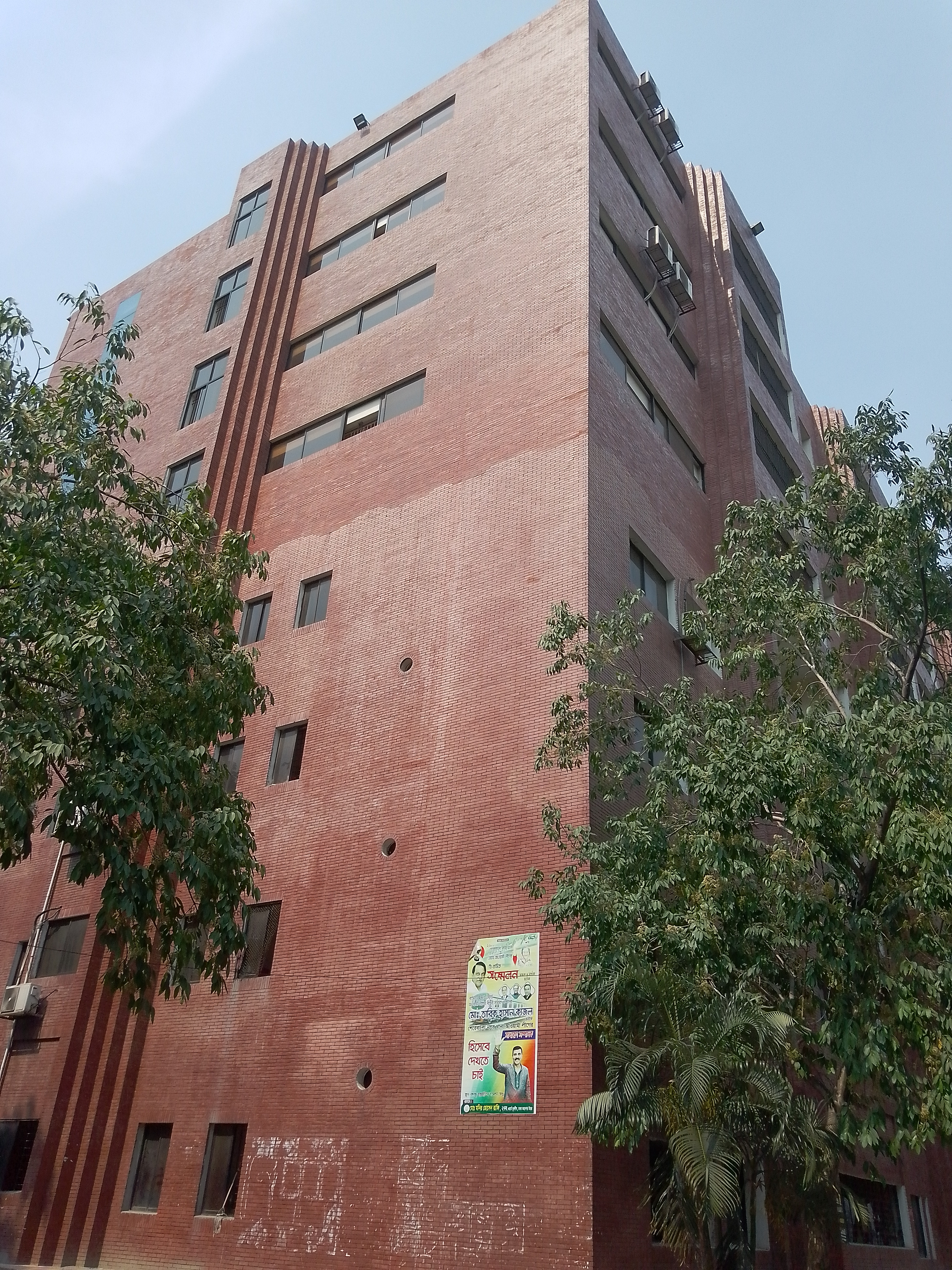

Geography
- Location: Sher-e-Bangla Nagar, Dhaka, Bangladesh

Organisation
- Type: Public teaching hospital

Services
- Emergency department: Yes
- Beds: 500

History
- Founded: 2001

Links
- Website: nikdu.org.bd

The National Institute of Kidney Diseases & Urology (NIKDU) is a specialized hospital and training center located in Dhaka, Bangladesh. It provides specialized treatment for patients suffering from kidney and urological diseases. It offers a full range of healthcare services for kidney patients, from primary care to advanced treatments, which include hemodialysis and care for patients suffering from end-stage renal failure.

== History ==
The project for the National Institute of Kidney Diseases & Urology was first planned in 1992 and was approved by the government in 1995. The institute was officially inaugurated in 2001, and hospital operations began in 2003. By the end of 2003, all staff positions were filled, and in 2005, the institute began receiving revenue allocations from the Ministry of Establishment. In 2006, it observed World Kidney Day for the first time.
