= List of roads in Dhaka =

There are three major series of highways in Dhaka, which are "N", "R" and "Z". Also there are unclassified roads in the city. The network of highways and roads in Dhaka, Bangladesh are managed by responsible authorities.

These are the list of routes in Dhaka.

Route		Road	Length	Status	Start	End	Remarks
Z3003	1	Abdullahpur–Ulukhola road	10.351 km (6.432 mi)	Functional	Abdullahpur, Uttara	Ulukhola, Kaliganj Upazila	
N3	2	Airport Road	15 km (9.3 mi)	Functional	Bishwaroad, Kuril	Abdullahpur, Uttara	
Z8208	3	Basilla road	6 km (3.7 mi)	Functional	Bus stand, Mohammadpur	Taranagar, Keraniganj Upazila	
N511	4	Birulia–Ashulia road	13 km (8.1 mi)	Functional	Birulia, Gabtali	Ashulia, Savar Upazila	
R801	5	Chashara–Jurain–Kamalapur road	14 km (8.7 mi)	Proposed	Chashara, Narayanganj	Kamalapur, Motijheel	
N5	6	Dhaka–Aricha highway	90 km (56 mi)	Functional	Mazar Road, Darussalam	Aricha Ghat, Manikganj District	
N8	7	Dhaka–Bhanga Expressway	55 km (34 mi)	Functional	Roundabout, Jatrabari	Bhanga, Faridpur District	
N105	8	Dhaka Bypass Expressway	48 km (30 mi)	Under construction	Kodda, Gazipur District	Madanpur, Narayanganj District	Connects Dhaka via Kanchan Bridge
Z3302	9	Dhaka Cantonment–V.V.I.P Terminal Road	5.38 km (3.34 mi)	Functional	Dhaka Cantonment	V.V.I.P Terminal, Kurmitola	
	10	Dhaka Elevated Expressway	19.73 km (12.26 mi)	Under construction	Abdullahpur, Uttara	Kutubkhali, Jatrabari	
R810	11	Dhaka–Narayanganj old road	12 km (7.5 mi)	Functional	Postagola, Old Dhaka	Chashara, Narayanganj	
R112	12	Hatirjheel–Demra Expressway	10 km (6.2 mi)	Proposed	Link road, Hatirjheel	Staff quarters, Demra	
R110	13	Jatrabari–Demra highway	17 km (11 mi)	Functional	Roundabout, Jatrabari	Bishwaroad, Tarabo	
R110	14	Narayanganj–Demra road	19 km (12 mi)	Functional	Chashara, Narayanganj	Roundabout, Jatrabari	
N1	15	Jatrabari–Kanchpur highway		Functional	Roundabout, Jatrabari	Kanchpur, Sonargaon Upazila	
Z1102	16	Matuail road	7 km (4.3 mi)	Functional	New Town, Matuail	Sekher Jaiga Bazar, Khilgaon	
N501	17	Mirpur Road	12.5 km (7.8 mi)	Functional	Science Lab, Dhanmondi	Dhour Beribadh, Uttara	
Z3004	18	Mirpur–Kodda road	8 km (5.0 mi)	Proposed	Metro Circle, Mirpur DOHS	Kodda, Gazipur District	
N301	19	Purbachal Expressway	12.5 km (7.8 mi)	Functional	Bishwaroad, Kuril	Kanchan Bridge, Purbachal New Town	
N530	20	Gabtali–Swarighat road	11.64 km (7.23 mi)	Functional	Gabtali, Darussalam	Kadamtali, Swarighat	
R201	21	Tarabo–Demra road	2.195 km (1.364 mi)	Functional	Tarabo, Rupganj Upazila	Demra, Dhaka	
N302	22	Tongi–Ashulia road	18 km (11 mi)	Functional	Abdullahpur, Uttara	Baipayl, Savar Upazila	
N302	23	Dhaka–Ashulia Elevated Expressway	24 km (15 mi)	Under construction	Abdullahpur, Uttara	Baipayl, Savar Upazila	
R303	24	Tongi bypass road	1 km (0.62 mi)	Functional	Kamarpara, Uttara	Monno Gate, Tongi	
R820	25	Zinzira–Sreenagar highway	71 km (44 mi)	Functional	Dholairpar, Old Dhaka	Sreenagar, Munshiganj District	
