= Dhaka East–West Elevated Expressway =

- ঢাকা পূর্ব-পশ্চিম উড়াল মহাসড়ক

Route information
- Length: 23 km (14 mi)
- Status: Under construction

Major junctions
- Savar end: Dhaka–Banglabandha Highway at Baliapur
- Bandar end: Dhaka–Teknaf Highway at Langalband

Location
- Country: Bangladesh

Highway system
- Roads in Bangladesh

Dhaka East–West Elevated Expressway (Bengali: ঢাকা পূর্ব-পশ্চিম উড়াল মহাসড়ক) is an under-construction elevated expressway project in Bangladesh. It is the third elevated expressway in Dhaka and forth elevated in Bangladesh. The expressway will connect Dhaka-Banlabandha highway and Dhaka-Kuakata highway to Dhaka–Teknaf highway.

The expressway will start at Baliapur of Savar upazila from Dhaka-Banglabandha highway and end at Langalband of Bandar Upazila in Dhaka-Teknaf highway. The expressway will financed on a public-private partnership basis through the prime minister of Bangladesh. The estimated cost of building this expressway is US$1263 million.

== See also ==
- Dhaka Elevated Expressway
- Dhaka–Ashulia Elevated Expressway
- List of roads in Bangladesh
