= Mizanur Rahman Azhari =

Bangladeshi Islamic preacher and author (born 1990)

- মিজানুর রহমান আজহারী
- Azhari in 2023
- Born: 26 January 1990 (age 36); Demra, Dhaka, Bangladesh
- Education: Al-Azhar University; International Islamic University Malaysia
- Occupations: Islamic preacher, author

Mizanur Rahman Azhari (Bengali: মিজানুর রহমান আজহারী; born 26 January 1990) is a Bangladeshi Islamic preacher and author. He is known for his public lectures on the Quran and hadith, particularly at waz mahfil gatherings, and for the circulation of his recorded sermons online. He studied at Al-Azhar University in Egypt and International Islamic University Malaysia.

Azhari spent several years in Malaysia after suspending public preaching engagements in Bangladesh in 2020, returning to the country in October 2024. His public activities have drawn political and public scrutiny, including the cancellation of his Australian visa in March 2026 following concerns about earlier remarks attributed to him.

== Early life and education ==
Azhari was born on 26 January 1990 in Demra, Dhaka. He attended Darunnajat Siddiquia Kamil Madrasa before receiving a scholarship to study in Egypt. He graduated from Al-Azhar University in 2012, having studied tafsir and Quranic sciences.

He subsequently pursued postgraduate study at International Islamic University Malaysia, where he completed a master's degree and further research degrees in Quranic and Islamic studies. His official biography identifies these qualifications as including an MPhil and PhD. The designation Azhari reflects his education at Al-Azhar University.

== Preaching career ==
Azhari became known in Bangladesh through lectures at Islamic congregations, where he discusses the Quran, Islamic ethics and aspects of contemporary life. His speeches have attracted large audiences, including younger listeners, and have circulated on social media.

In early 2020, several planned religious gatherings featuring Azhari were cancelled amid objections from the authorities about his sermons and concerns about public order. In February that year, he announced the suspension of his scheduled public lectures and spent the following period in Malaysia, where he continued his studies and online religious activities.

In October 2021, Azhari was prevented from boarding a flight from Doha to London, where he had been due to speak at religious events. Dhaka Tribune reported that the airline did not receive the necessary clearance from British immigration authorities.

Azhari returned to Bangladesh on 2 October 2024, following the fall of the Sheikh Hasina government earlier that year. He subsequently resumed addressing large public gatherings. In April 2025, he spoke at a demonstration in Dhaka in support of Palestinians in the Gaza Strip. In November 2025, he announced that he was postponing his remaining regional Quranic commentary gatherings in view of election-related activity and the demands that large events placed on law-enforcement agencies.

== Publications and foundation ==
Azhari has written Bengali-language books on Islamic belief, Quranic interpretation and religious practice. His published works include:

- Message: Adhunik Monone Diner Chhowa (ম্যাসেজ: আধুনিক মননে দ্বীনের ছোঁয়া, 2021).
- Ahoban: Adhunik Monone Alor Porosh (আহ্বান: আধুনিক মননে আলোর পরশ, 2022).
- Reflection from Surah Yusuf (রিফ্লেকশন ফ্রম সূরা ইউসুফ, 2023).
- Jege Otho Abar (জেগে ওঠো আবার, 2024).
- Ek Nozore Quran (এক নজরে কুরআন, 2025).

He is also the founder and chairman of the Hasanah Foundation, a nonprofit organisation established in 2025 that describes its work as focusing on education and social welfare.

== Public statements and controversies ==
In September 2025, Azhari criticised a government proposal to appoint specialist music and fine-arts teachers in state primary schools. He argued that the government should also create posts for teachers of Islamic education.

On 31 March 2026, Australian authorities cancelled Azhari's visa during a planned speaking tour. News reports linked the decision to allegations concerning earlier antisemitic remarks, including statements about Adolf Hitler and Jewish people. He acknowledged the visa cancellation but said that older comments had been presented without their context and denied that he had made any speeches in Australia during that visit. Subsequent Australian reporting stated that he was deported.
