= Noapara =

Noapara may refer to:

- Noapara, Bangladesh
- Noapara, Jessore
- Noapara, North 24 Parganas, a census town in Barrackpore I CD Block, West Bengal, India
- Noapara, Baranagar, a neighbourhood in Baranagar, West Bengal, India
- Noapara metro station and depot, a metro railway station in Baranagar
- Noapara (Vidhan Sabha constituency), West Bengal, India
