= Chittagong–Kaptai highway =

Highway in Bangladesh

R163
- চট্টগ্রাম–কাপ্তাই মহাসড়ক
- Chittagong–Kaptai highway
- Chittagong–Kaptai highway at Rangunia

Route information
- Maintained by Bangladesh Road Transport Authority
- Length: 52 km (32 mi)
- Existed: 1963–present

Major junctions
- West end: Chandgaon, Chittagong District
- East end: Kaptai, Rangamati District

Location
- Country: Bangladesh
- Major cities: Chittagong, Rangunia, Noapara, Kaptai

Highway system
- Roads in Bangladesh
← N107	→ R161

Chittagong–Kaptai highway or Kaptai road is a 52 km (32 mi) regional highway located in the division of Chittagong, Bangladesh. This highway passes through Chittagong, Hathazari Upazila, Raozan Upazila and Rangunia Upazila of Chittagong District to Kaptai in Rangamati District. At least 0.9 million passengers use this highway.

== Background ==
During the construction of Karnafuli Hydroelectric Power Station in 1963, this road was constructed to transport equipments required for the construction of the power station from Chittagong. At that time the length of the road was 49 km. 15.25 meters wide land was acquired for the road but at that time the road was constructed 6 meters wide. The first bus service was introduced on the highway area in 1962. Later, local bus transport services were also started on the newly built road. But in 2009 the local bus transport service was stopped. In 2023, local bus transport services were re-introduced on this road from Bahaddarhat to Kaptai. This highway is an accident prone dangerous road.

== Route ==
1. Kaptai Junction
2. Quaish Circle
3. Nazumiar Haat
4. Modunaghat
5. Noapara
6. Goshchi
7. Pahartali
8. CUET
9. Gochra Chowmuhni
10. Rangunia
11. Roajarhaat
12. Chandraghona
13. Lichubagan
14. Sheikh Russel Eco Park
15. Baraichari
16. Waggachara
17. Shilchari
18. Chitmorom
19. Zero point
20. Bus station
