= N120 (Bangladesh) =

Road in Bangladesh

N120
- Dhaka–Cumilla Highway || Cumilla–Chattogram Highway

Route information
- Maintained by Bangladesh Road Transport Authority

Major junctions
- From: Alekharchar
- Fouzdari square, Balutopa and Chanapur
- To: Suagazi

Location
- Country: Bangladesh

Highway system
- Roads in Bangladesh
| ← N1 | → N1 |

The N120 is one of the main transportation artery in Bangladesh, between Alekharchar and Suagazi of Comilla city. The name of this highway from Alekharchar to Faujdari More is Dhaka-Comilla Highway and the name of the highway from Faujdari More to Suagazi is Comilla-Chittagong Highway. It works as a busy intra city road.

== Route description ==
This highway, connecting Alekharchar and Suagazi between the city runs approximately 20.94 kilometres (13.01 mi) both point connecting N1 national highway. The road also a part of national highway (120) of Roads and Highways Department.

== Major points ==
The major points of the highway are:

- Policeline square
- Fouzdari square
- Eidghah mor
- Rajgang square
- Balutopa mor
- Chanpapur

== See also ==
- N1 (Bangladesh)
- N114 (Bangladesh)
- N101 (Bangladesh)
- Z1024 (Bangladesh)
- Z1052 (Bangladesh)
- Z1021 (Bangladesh)
