= N401 (Bangladesh) =

National highway of Bangladesh

N401
- Tangail–Mymensingh Highway; Madhupur–Mymensingh Road

Route information
- Length: 46.98 km (29.19 mi)

Major junctions
- From: N4 in Madhupur
- Z4101 Bhavki's turn; Z4104 / Z4105 Muktagacha Bazar; N309 Rahmatpur Bypass Junction; Z3035 Townhall turn; N3 TT College turn
- To: R370 Mymensingh Zero Point in Mymensingh

Location
- Country: Bangladesh
- Major cities: Madhupur, Muktagachha, Mymensingh

Highway system
- Roads in Bangladesh
← N4	→ N402

National Highway 401, also known as the Tangail–Mymensingh Highway, is a national highway in Bangladesh. The highway connects Madhupur in Tangail District with Mymensingh. The total length of this highway is 48.98 kilometres (30.43 mi).

The road embankment work was completed in 2005–2006. The road was re-paved in 2011. The renovation and widening work on the highway began on July 1, 2021. The project cost 1,107 crore taka.
