= Dhaka–Narayanganj old road =

Highway in Bangladesh

R810
- Dhaka–Narayanganj Old Road

Route information
- Maintained by Bangladesh Road Transport Authority
- Length: 12 km (7.5 mi)

Major junctions
- West end: Postagola, Old Dhaka
- East end: Chashara, Narayanganj

Location
- Country: Bangladesh
- Major cities: Dhaka; Narayanganj

Highway system
- Roads in Bangladesh
← N8	→ R110

Dhaka–Narayanganj Old Road is a 12 km (7.5 mi) regional highway located in the division of Dhaka, Bangladesh. It is one of three entryways from Dhaka to Narayanganj.

== Background ==
Before the inauguration of the Dhaka–Narayanganj link road in 1997, it was the main road that connects Dhaka with Narayanganj. It starts from Postagola in West and ends at Chashara in East. This 12 km highway is connected with the R812 in the south-east point of Panchabati. Due to its commercial importance, this road is used by goods vehicles and there are many industries on both sides of this road. The road is quite narrow and most of it is broken. Due to various issues, traffic jams occur continuously on this highway. It is an accident prone highway. It is a pavementless highway with dust always flying on both sides of the highway due to illegal dumping of bricks, sand and cement by traders.

== Expansion ==
There is a plan to upgrade this highway from two lanes to six lanes. In 2022, as part of the expansion of the highway, the bungalow and the wall of police outpost in Chashara were demolished.

== Route ==
1. Postagola
2. Shyampur
3. Otobi
4. Pagla
5. Aliganj
6. Post office
7. Fatulla
8. Police station
9. Panchabati
10. Iron market
11. Afaznagar
12. Police line
13. Gabtoli circle
14. Masdair Gorostan
15. OCTO office
16. Chashara
