= Main Road, Cox's Bazar =

Highway in Bangladesh

R180
- Main Road

Route information
- Maintained by Bangladesh Road Transport Authority
- Length: 6.105 km (3.793 mi)

Major junctions
- East end: Central Bus Terminal, Cox's Bazar District
- West end: Zero Point, Cox's Bazar

Location
- Country: Bangladesh
- Major cities: Cox's Bazar

Highway system
- Roads in Bangladesh
← N110	→ Z1132

The Main Road is a 6.105 km (3.793 mi) regional highway located in the district of Cox's Bazar, Chittagong Division, Bangladesh.

== Background ==
The length of the main road is 6.105 km (3.793 mi). It extends from the central bus terminal to Hashemiya Madrasa. This road was previously under the Bangladesh Road Transport Authority. Later it was handed over to the Cox's Bazar Development Authority (CDA) which is now responsible for its maintenance.

== Expansion ==
In 2019, a project proposed by CDA to convert the road to four lanes was finalised by the Executive Committee of the National Economic Council. The budget for the widening of the road was fixed at around ৳294.15 crore. On 18 October 2020, the renovation and widening of the highway began. The deadline for the project was set at 2023, but the authorities wanted to complete it by 2022.

== Route ==
1. Link Road
2. BGB Camp
3. 16 ECB Ground
4. Rumalia
5. Zero point
