= Khuruskul–Chowfaldandi–Eidgah Road =

District highway in Bangladesh

Z1132
- Khuruskul–Chowfaldandi–Eidgah Road

Route information
- Maintained by Bangladesh Road Transport Authority
- Length: 21 km (13 mi)

Major junctions
- South end: Tarabaniarchara, Cox's Bazar
- North end: Eidgah bus stand, Eidgaon

Location
- Country: Bangladesh
- Major cities: Cox's Bazar

Highway system
- Roads in Bangladesh
← N1	→ R180

The Khuruskul–Chowfaldandi–Eidgah Road (Bengali: খুরুশকুল–চৌফলদন্ডী–ঈদগাঁও সড়ক) is a 21-kilometre (13 mi) district highway located in the district of Cox's Bazar, Chittagong Division, Bangladesh. It is alternative road to the city from the north. The road connects the city by Khuruskul Bailey Bridge. On 22 September 2019, its reconstruction was inaugurated. In 2023, the road was connected by newly-built Chowfaldandi bridge.
