= List of roads in Bangladesh =

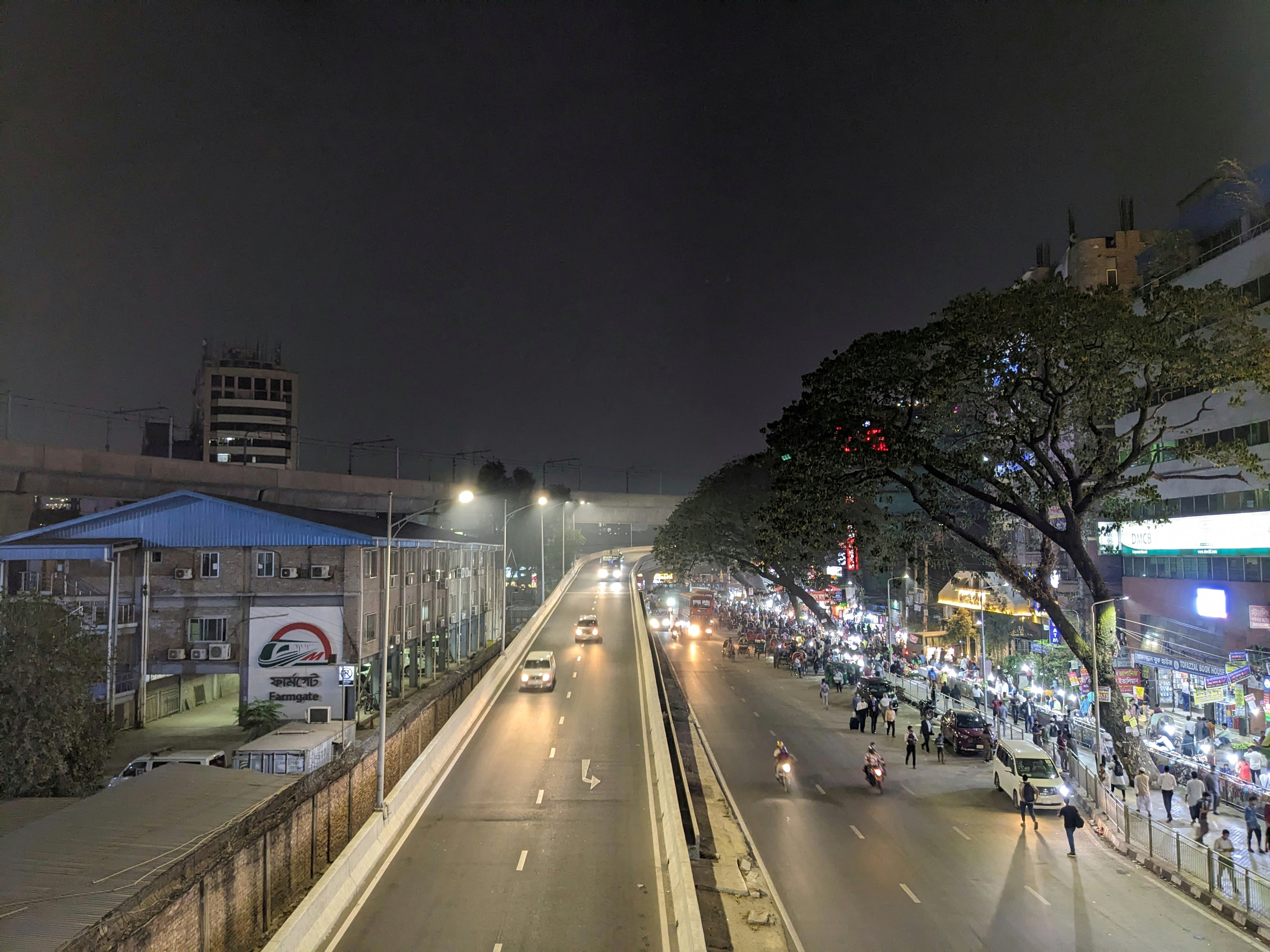
Dhaka Elevated Expressway

The road network of Bangladesh consists of national highways (designated by a number preceded by "N"), regional highways (R numbers) and zilla or district roads (Z numbers) which are maintained by Roads and Highways Department, as well as Upazila Roads, Union Roads, and Village Roads which are maintained by Local Government Engineering Department.The total length of roads in Bangladesh used to be 27,600 km in 2006 and registered a 15-fold increase by 2022. The total length is more than 375,000 km in 2023.

== Expressways ==
=== Operational ===
Expressways (operational)
| Name | Completion Year | Length | Toll? | Cite |
|---|---|---|---|---|
| Dhaka–Bhanga Expressway | 2021 | 55 km | Yes | |
| Dhaka Elevated Expressway | 2023 | 11.5 km operational. Full length 19.84 km | Yes | |
| Purbachal Expressway | 2023 | 13 km | No | |
| Chattogram Elevated Expressway | 2024 | 16 km | Yes | |
| Dhaka Bypass Expressway | 2025 | 18 km operational. Full length 48km | Yes | |

=== Under construction ===
Expressways (under construction)
| Name | Completion Year | Length | Toll? | Cite |
|---|---|---|---|---|
| Dhaka–Ashulia Elevated Expressway | 2026 | 24 km | Yes | |
| Dhaka East-West Elevated Expressway | 2028 | 23 km | Yes | |
| Hatirjheel–Demra Expressway | 2026 | 10 km | No | |
| Dhaka Inner Ring Expressway | 2027 | 27 km | No | |

=== Approved ===
Expressways (Approved)
| No. | Name | Completion Year | Length | Cite |
|---|---|---|---|---|
| 1 | Dhaka-Chattogram | Late 2032 | 224.64 km | |
| 2 | Chattogram-Cox's Bazar | Late 2032 | 136 km | |
| 3 | Bhanga-Benapole Expressway | Mid 2028 | 129.17 km | |

=== Proposed/Planned ===
- Gabtoli–Nabinagar–Paturia Expressway
- Tamabil–Gundum Expressway
- Gobrakura–Payra port Expressway
- Kotalipara–Mongla Port Expressway
- Burimari–Bhomra Expressway
- Banglabandha–Jaldhaka Expressway
- Joypurhat–Tamabil Expressway
- Sonamashjid–Brahmanbaria Expressway
- Benapole–Laksam Expressway
- Bhanga-Barishal-Kuakata Expressway

== Roads and highways ==
Road network lengths
| Network | Length (km) | Length (mi) |
|---|---|---|
| National highways | 3,990.75 | 2,479.74 |
| Regional highways | 4,206.121 | 2,613.562 |
| Zilla roads | 13,121.757 | 8,153.482 |
| Upazila roads | 37,800 | 23,500 |
| Union roads | 44,750 | 27,810 |
| Village roads | 215,750 | 134,060 |
| Total | 375,000 | 233,000 |

National Highways
| S.No. | Highway No. | Route | Length (km) | Length (mi) |
|---|---|---|---|---|
| 1 | N1 | Dhaka (N8) - Katchpur (N2) - Madanpur (N105) - Mainamati (N102) - Cumilla (R140) - Feni (N104) - Chattogram (N106) - Manashertek (N107) - Satkania (N108) - Ramu (N109) - Cox's Bazar (N110) - Teknaf | 455 | 283 |
| 2 | N2 | Katchpur (N1) - Bhulta (N105) - Sarail (N102) - Jagadishpur (N204) - Shaistaganj (N204) - Mirpur (N207) - Sherpur (N207) - Sylhet (N205, *N208) - Jaintiapur - Jaflong | 286 | 178 |
| 3 | N3 | Dhaka — Progoti Sarani (N301) - Tongi (N302) - Joydebpur (N105, N4) - Mymensingh | 112 | 70 |
| 4 | N4 | Joydebpur (N3, R310) - Kadda (N105) - Tangail (N404) - Elenga (N405) - Madhupur (N401) - Jamalpur | 146 | 91 |
| 5 | N5 | Dhaka - Mirpur Bridge (N501) - Nabinagar (R505) - Manikganj (R504) -Muljan - Uthali (N503) - (ferry) - Natakhola — Baderhat (N505, N513) - Kashinathpur (N6, N504) - Shahjanpur (N515) - Banani (N514) - Bogura western bypass: Jahangirabad (N502) - Tinmatha (N510) - Matidali (N514, N515) - Mordern More (N506) - Rangpur bypass (N517) - Saidpur bypass (N518) - Ranirbandar (Z5005) - Beldanga (N508) - Thakurgaon - Panchagarh - Tentulia — IND (Banglabandha) | 507 | 315 |
| 6 | N6 | Kashinathpur (N5, N504) - Pabna bypass (N604) - Gaspara (N604) - Dasuria (N704, N705) - Banpara (N507) - Harispur (N602) - Chawk Bidaynath (N602) - Belpukur (N603) - Rajshahi (R680) | 150 | 93 |
| 7 | N7 | Daulatdia Ferryghat — Goalchamot (N803) - Magura (N704) - Arappur (N704) - Jhenaidah - Hamdah (N703) - Palbari (N707, N708) - Chanchra (N706) - Murail (N707) - Phultala (N709) - Khulna - (ferry) - Kudir Battala (N709) - Digraj | 252 | 157 |
| 8 | N8 | Dhaka - Mawa Ferryghat (R812) - (ferry) - Bhanga (N804, N805) - Barishal (N809) - Patuakhali | 191 | 119 |
| 9 | N102 | Sarail (N2) - Ghaturia (N103) - Brahmanbaria - Kuatali (N103) - Mainamati (N1) | 82 | 51 |
| 10 | N103 | Ghaturia (N102) - Kuatali (N102) Brahmanbaria bypass | 5 | 3.1 |
| 11 | N104 | Feni (N1) - Chowmohani (R140) - Noakhali - Somapur R140 connects to N809 at Lakshmipur | 49 | 30 |
| 12 | N105 | Kadda (N4) - Joydebpur (N3) - Debogram (N301) - Bhulta (N2) - Madanpur (N1) Dhaka eastern bypass, partly under construction | 49 | 30 |
| 13 | N106 | Chattogram (N1) - Hathazari - Rangamati | 65 | 40 |
| 14 | N107 | Manashertek (N1) - Boalkhali | 12 | 7.5 |
| 15 | N108 | Satkania (N1) - Bandarban (R161) | 22 | 14 |
| 16 | N109 | road through Ramu N1 has a bypass | 2 | 1.2 |
| 17 | N110 | Cox's Bazar - N1 | 8 | 5.0 |
| 18 | N114 | Cumilla - Kasba | 8 | 5.0 |
| 19 | N101 | Cumilla - Bibirbazar Land Port Connecting Road | 6 | 3.7 |
| 20 | N204 | Jagadishpur (N2) - Chunarughat - Shaistaganj (N2) | 34 | 21 |
| 21 | N205 | Chandipool (N2) - Sylhet (N206, N209) | 2 | 1.2 |
| 22 | N206 | Sylhet (N205, N209) - Naiorful (N2) | 1 | 0.62 |
| 23 | N207 | Mirpur (N2) - Srimangal - Moulvibazar (N208) - Sherpur (N2) | 68 | 42 |
| 24 | N208 | Moulvibazar (N207) - Sylhet bypass (N2, N209) | 59 | 37 |
| 25 | N209 | Sylhet (N205, N206) - Sylhet bypass (N2, N208) | 1 | 0.62 |
| 26 | N301 | Purbachal Expressway Kuril Flyover - Kachon Bridge (N105) | 13 | 8.1 |
| 27 | N302 | Tongi (N3) - Dhour (N501) - Yearpur (N511) - Baipal (R505) R505 connects to N5 at Nabinagar | 18 | 11 |
| 28 | N309 | Khagdahar (N401) - Mymensingh bypass (N3) | 13 | 8.1 |
| 29 | N401 | Madhupur (N4) - Khagdahar (N309) - Mymensingh (N3) | 47 | 29 |
| 30 | N403 | Mirzapur Town old Section | 4 | 2.5 |
| 31 | N404 | Road through Tangail N4 has a bypass | 6 | 3.7 |
| 32 | N405 | Elenga (N4) - Hatikamrul (N5, N507) | 18 | 11 |
| 33 | N501 | Mirpur Bridge (N5) - Berulia (N511) - Dhour (N302) | 14 | 8.7 |
| 34 | N502 | Natore (N602) - Bogura (N5) | 63 | 39 |
| 35 | N503 | Uthali (N5) - Aricha | 3 | 1.9 |
| 36 | N504 | Kashinathpur (N5, N6) - Nagarbari | 7 | 4.3 |
| 37 | N505 | Baderhat (N5, N513) - Kazirhat | 3 | 1.9 |
| 38 | N506 | Mordern More (N5) - Lalbag more (N517) - Barabari (N509) - Kurigram | 50 | 31 |
| 39 | N507 | Hatikamrul (N5, N405) - Banpara (N6) | 51 | 32 |
| 40 | N508 | Beldanga (N5) - Dinajpur (R585) | 16 | 9.9 |
| 41 | N509 | Baranari (N506) - Lalmonirhat — Patgram — IND (Burimari) | 105 | 65 |
| 42 | N510 | Bogura (N514) - Tinmatha (N5) | 3 | 1.9 |
| 43 | N511 | Berulia (N501) - Yearpur (N302) | 13 | 8.1 |
| 44 | N512 | Kurigram (N506) - Nageswari (Z5616),(Z5617) - Bhurungamari (Z5622) - Sonahat Landport (Z5624) | 49.90 | 31.01 |
| 45 | N513 | Baderhat (N5, N505) - Khayerchar | 11 | 6.8 |
| 46 | N514 | Banani (N5) - Bogura — Matidali (N5, N515) | 9 | 5.6 |
| 47 | N515 | Shahjanpur (N5) - Matidali Bogura eastern bypass, under construction | 16 | 9.9 |
| 48 | N516 | Santahar (R546) - Naogaon (R545) only N highway not linked to main network | 8 | 5.0 |
| 49 | N517 | Lalnag more (N506) - Rangpur (N5) | 8 | 5.0 |
| 50 | N518 | road through Saidpur shortcut to N5, which has a bypass | 4 | 2.5 |
| 51 | N602 | Harispur (N6) - Natore (N502) - Chawk Bidaynath (N6) | 5 | 3.1 |
| 52 | N603 | Belpukur (N6) - Paba — Kashiadanga (R680) | 21 | 13 |
| 53 | N604 | Pabna (N6) - Gaspara (N6) | 8 | 5.0 |
| 54 | N605 | Rajshahi Greater Road, C&B More (N6) - Railgate (R685) | 3 | 1.9 |
| 55 | N701 | Daulatdia Ferryghat by-pass Road | 1 | 0.62 |
| 56 | N702 | Magura (N7) - Jashore (N708, N706, N707) | 44 | 27 |
| 57 | N703 | Jhenaidah (N704) - Hamdah (N7) | 3 | 1.9 |
| 58 | N704 | Dasuria (N6, N705) - Ruppur (N705) - Kushtia — Arappur (N7) - Jhenaidah (N703) | 81 | 50 |
| 59 | N705 | Dasuria (N6, N704) - Ishwardi (Z6006) - Ruppur (N704) | 9 | 5.6 |
| 60 | N706 | Jashore (N702, N707) - Chanchra (N7) - Benapole (N711) - IND (NH35) | 38 | 24 |
| 61 | N707 | Palbari (N7, N708) - Jashore (N702, N706) - Monihar (N708) - Murail (N7) | 7 | 4.3 |
| 62 | N708 | Palbari (N7, N707) - Jashore northern bypass (N702) - Monihar (N707) | 5 | 3.1 |
| 63 | N709 | Khulna bypass: Phultala (N7) - Kudir Battala (N7) | 27 | 17 |
| 64 | N710 | Khulna Town Old Section: Ferryghat(N7)-Dakbangla More | 0.4 | 0.25 |
| 65 | N711 | Banapole bypass (N706) | 1 | 0.62 |
| 66 | N712 | Jhenaidah Bus Terminal(N7)-Arappur Intersection(N704)-Alhera Bus Stand(N703) | 6 | 3.7 |
| 67 | N713 | Kushtia Bypass (N705) | 6.4 | 4.0 |
| 68 | N714 | Sheikh Hasina Medical University - Bongabondhu Economic Zone Connecting Road | 12.3 | 7.6 |
| 69 | N715 | Satkhhira - Alipur-Bhomra Highway | 15 | 9.3 |
| 70 | N716 | Khulna-Terokhada-Gopalganj (Chandradighulia) Road | 35 | 22 |
| 71 | N760 | Khulna-Chuknagar-Satkhira Road | 60 | 37 |
| 72 | N765 | Navaran-Illishpur-Kalaroa-Satkhira Road | 43 | 27 |
| 73 | N766 | Satkhira Town bypass Road | 12.35 | 7.67 |
| 74 | N801 | Barishal-Bhola Link Road | 4.85 | 3.01 |
| 75 | N802 | 2nd Buriganga Bridge Approach Road to National Highway N8 | 5 | 3.1 |
| 76 | N803 | Goalchamot (N7) - Alipur (N804) - Faridpur | 7 | 4.3 |
| 77 | N804 | Alipur (N803) - Bhanga (N8, N805) | 32 | 20 |
| 78 | N805 | Bhanga (N8, N804) - Bhatiapara (N806) - Gopalganj (R850) - Mollarhat (R856) - Fakirhat (R771) - Noapara (N7) | 111 | 69 |
| 79 | N806 | Bhatiapara (N805) - Kalna - Lohagara - Narail -Jashore (N707) | 56 | 35 |
| 80 | N807 | Barishal (N8) -Jhalakathi (Z8730)-Pirojpur (Z7704) Bagerhat (R771) connects to N805 at Town Noapara | 95 | 59 |
| 81 | N809 | Barishal (N8) - (ferry) - Chatarmatha - (ferry) - Lakshmipur (R140) R140 connects to N104 at Chowmohani | 68 | 42 |
| 82 | N810 | Hasnabad Intersection (N8) - Pangaon Container Terminal | 5 | 3.1 |

== List of regional roads ==
| S.No. | Road No. | Route | Length (km) | Length (mi) |
|---|---|---|---|---|
| 1 | R110 | Jatrabari-Demra-Shimrail-Narayanganj (Chasara) Road | 19 | 12 |
| 2 | R111 | Signboard at 6th km of N1Road-Narayanganj Road | 9 | 5.6 |
| 3 | R112 | Narayanganj (Signboard)-Demra-Amulia-Rampura Road | 18 | 11 |
| 4 | R113 | Madanpur-Madanganj-Sayedpur Road | 12 | 7.5 |
| 5 | R114 | Nayapur-Araihazar-Narsingdi-Raipura Road | 55 | 34 |
| 6 | R120 | Akhaura Town By-Pass Road | 2 | 1.2 |
| 7 | R140 | Cumilla-Lalmai-Chandpur-Lakhmipur-Begumganj Road | 138 | 86 |
| 8 | R141 | Lalmai-Laksam-Sonaimuri Road | 38 | 24 |
| 9 | R142 | Begamganj-Sonaimuri-Ramganj Road | 38 | 24 |
| 10 | R143 | Maijdi-Rajganj-Chayani-Basurhat-Chandraganj Road | 20 | 12 |
| 11 | R144 | Laksam Old Section | 4 | 2.5 |
| 12 | R147 | Lakshmipur Town Bridge-Tero Baki Road | 2 | 1.2 |
| 13 | R151 | Baraiyerhat-Karerhat-Heako-Narayanhat-Kazir Hat-Fatikchhari (Haidchokia) Road | 48 | 30 |
| 14 | R152 | Heako-Ramgarh Road | 18 | 11 |
| 15 | R160 | Hathazari-Fatikchhari-Manikchhari-Matiranga-Khagrachhari Road | 89 | 55 |
| 16 | R161 | Rangamati (Ghagra)-Chandragona-Bangalhalia-Bandarban Road | 61 | 38 |
| 17 | R162 | Rangamati (Manikchhari)-Mohalchhari-Khagrachhari Road | 63 | 39 |
| 18 | R163 | Chattogram (Mohara)-Chandragona Road | 33 | 21 |
| 19 | R164 | Baraichhari-Kaptai Road | 10 | 6.2 |
| 20 | R170 | Patiya-Anowara-Banshkhali-Toitong-Pekua-Badarkhali-Chokoria (Eidmoni) Road | 73 | 45 |
| 21 | R171 | Banshkhali (Charati)-Chunti Road | 16 | 9.9 |
| 22 | R172 | Chokoria-Baderkhali Road | 18 | 11 |
| 23 | R180 | Laharpur-Jhinukmarket-Laboni More Road | 5 | 3.1 |
| 24 | R201 | Tarabo-Demraghat Road | 2 | 1.2 |
| 25 | R202 | Bhulta-Rupganj-Kayetpara-Rampura Road | 23 | 14 |
| 26 | R203 | Bhulta-Araihazar-Bancharampur-Nabinagar-Shibpur-Radhika Road | 81 | 50 |
| 27 | R210 | Shahepratap-Narsingdi Road | 5 | 3.1 |
| 28 | R211 | Itakhola-Motkhola-Kotiadi Road | 45 | 28 |
| 29 | R212 | Akdaria (C&B Bazar)-Shekher Bazar-Puradia-Agarpur Road | 22 | 14 |
| 30 | R220 | Sarail-Nasirnagar-Lakhai-Habiganj Road | 52 | 32 |
| 31 | R240 | Shaistaganj-Habiganj-Nabiganj-Sherpur (Auskandi) Road | 51 | 32 |
| 32 | R241 | Auskandi-Raniganj-Jagannathpur-Pagla Road | 46 | 29 |
| 33 | R250 | Sylhet-Golapganj-Charkhai-Zakiganj Road | 90 | 56 |
| 34 | R251 | Golapganj-Dhaka Dakshin-Baraigram-Bhadeswar Road | 14 | 8.7 |
| 35 | R280 | Sylhet-Sunamganj Road | 66 | 41 |
| 36 | R281 | Rajnagar-Kulaura-Juri-Baralekha-Beanibazar-Sheola-Charkhai Road | 83 | 52 |
| 37 | R282 | Juri-Lathidila Road | 16 | 9.9 |
| 38 | R301 | Tongi-Kaliganj-Ghorashal-Pachdona Road | 33 | 21 |
| 39 | R302 | Kaliganj Bazar Road | 7 | 4.3 |
| 40 | R303 | Tongi By-Pass Road | 1 | 0.62 |
| 41 | R310 | Joydebpur-Gazipur-Azmatpur-Itakhola Road | 43 | 27 |
| 42 | R311 | Joydebpur (BARI More)-Ordnance Factory (Shahid Zaman Road) | 6 | 3.7 |
| 43 | R312 | Rajendrapur Chowrasta-Kapasia-Toke-Motkhola Road | 43 | 27 |
| 44 | R313 | Mawna-Sreepur-Goshinga-Kapasia-Aral-Sammania-Hatirdia-Monohardi (Hetemdi) Road | 43 | 27 |
| 45 | R314 | Gafargaon-Mawna Road | 42 | 26 |
| 46 | R315 | Mawna-Fulbaria-Kaliakair-Dhamrai-Nabinagar (Dulivita) Road | 51 | 32 |
| 47 | R360 | Mymensingh (Raghurampur)-Kishoreganj (Battali)-Bhairab (Bazar) Road | 116 | 72 |
| 48 | R364 | Battoli at R360-Kishoreganj Road | 3 | 1.9 |
| 49 | R370 | Mymensingh (D.C Office)-Raghurampur-Netrokona-Mohonganj-Jamalganj-Sunamganj Road | 131 | 81 |
| 50 | R371 | Sherpur-Nakla-Phulpur-Mymensingh (Raghurampur) Road | 65 | 40 |
| 51 | R450 | Jamuna Bridge (Saidabad)-Sirajganj Road | 7 | 4.3 |
| 52 | R451 | Nalka-Sirajganj Road | 15 | 9.3 |
| 53 | R460 | Jamalpur-Sherpur-Bangaon Road | 30 | 19 |
| 54 | R480 | Elanga-Bhuanpur Road | 17 | 11 |
| 55 | R504 | Hemayetpur-Singair-Manikganj Road | 34 | 21 |
| 56 | R505 | Nabinagar-EPZ-Kaliakair (Chandra) Road | 16 | 9.9 |
| 57 | R506 | Aricha (Barangail)-Ghior-Daulatpur-Tangail Road | 53 | 33 |
| 58 | R545 | Bogura-Naogaon-Mohadebpur-Patnitala-Dhamoirhat-Joypurhat Road | 121 | 75 |
| 59 | R546 | Railgarte-Shantahar Road | 3 | 1.9 |
| 60 | R547 | Naogaon-Badalgachhi-Patnitala-Shapahar-Porsha-Rohonpur Road | 101 | 63 |
| 61 | R548 | Naogaon-Atrai-Natore Road | 55 | 34 |
| 62 | R549 | Badalgachhi-Paharpur-Joypurhat (Khanjanpur) Road | 20 | 12 |
| 63 | R550 | Mokamtala-Kalai-Joypurhat Road | 37 | 23 |
| 64 | R555 | Palashbari-Gaibandah Road | 21 | 13 |
| 65 | R556 | Mithapukur-Shahebganj-Maddahpara-Fulbaria Road | 35 | 22 |
| 66 | R557 | Madhypara-Badarganj Road | 13 | 8.1 |
| 67 | R558 | Maheshpur at R556 to Barapukuria Road | 5 | 3.1 |
| 68 | R570 | Sayedpur-Nilphamari Road | 16 | 9.9 |
| 69 | R585 | Gobindagnj-Goraghat-Birampur-Fulbari-Dinajpur Road | 106 | 66 |
| 70 | R586 | Fulbari Bus Stand-Dinajpur Govt. College Road | 3 | 1.9 |
| 71 | R587 | Thakurgaon Town Old Section (Bus Stand-Railway Station) | 6 | 3.7 |
| 72 | R601 | Pabna-Sujanagar-Natakhola Ferry Ghat (Baderhat) Road | 52 | 32 |
| 73 | R602 | Nazirganj at R601 to Nazirganj Ferry Ghat Road | 1 | 0.62 |
| 74 | R603 | Pabna-Paksey Nadi Bandar (EPZ) Road | 26 | 16 |
| 75 | R604 | Tebunia-Chatmohor-Handial-Hamkuria Road | 41 | 25 |
| 76 | R680 | Rajshahi-Godagari-Nawabganj Road | 45 | 28 |
| 77 | R681 | Ujanpara-Bijoynagar Road (Old Part) | 13 | 8.1 |
| 78 | R685 | Rajshahi (Bindur More)-Nawhata-Chowmasia Road | 66 | 41 |
| 79 | R710 | Ahaladipur-Rajbari-Pangsha-Kumarkhali-Kushtia (Chourhash) Road | 72 | 45 |
| 80 | R711 | Rajbari (Bagmara)-Joukura Ferryghat Road | 5 | 3.1 |
| 81 | R712 | Tottipur at R771-Machpara Link Road | 2 | 1.2 |
| 82 | R713 | Charikoal at R711-Shilahdah Link Road | 5 | 3.1 |
| 83 | R720 | Magura-Narail Road | 47 | 29 |
| 84 | R744 | Kushtia Town By-Pass Road | 7 | 4.3 |
| 85 | R745 | Kushtia (Trimohoni)-Maherpur-Chuadanga-Jhenaidah Road | 117 | 73 |
| 86 | R746 | Meherpur-Mujibnagar (BRD Camp) Road | 13 | 8.1 |
| 87 | R747 | Kushtia (Bottoli)-Poradah-Alamdanga-Chuadanga Road | 45 | 28 |
| 88 | R748 | Chuadanga-Darsana-Jibannagar-Kotchchandpur-Kaliganj Road | 66 | 41 |
| 89 | R749 | Darsana-Mujibnagar Road | 30 | 19 |
| 90 | R755 | Jashore (Rajarhat)-Monirampur-Keshabpur-Chuknagar Road | 38 | 24 |
| 91 | R770 | Noapara-Bagerhat-Pirojpur Road | 43 | 27 |
| 92 | R771 | Rupsha-Fakirhat-Bagerhat Road | 31 | 19 |
| 93 | R772 | Bagerhat Town Section (Bus Stand-Basabati) | 1 | 0.62 |
| 94 | R856 | Noapara (Katakhali)-Fakirhat-Mollahat Road | 31 | 19 |
| 95 | R801 | Jurain-Chasara Road | 10 | 6.2 |
| 96 | R802 | Bishwa Road (Kamlapur)-Bashabo-Madertek-Trimohoni-Kayetpara Road | 4 | 2.5 |
| 97 | R803 | Jurain-Kamalapur-Shajahanpur-Abdullahpur Road | 26 | 16 |
| 98 | R810 | Postagola-Chasara Road | 11 | 6.8 |
| 99 | R812 | Fatullah (Panchaboti)-Munshiganj (Muktarpur)-Lohajang-Mawa Road | 44 | 27 |
| 100 | R813 | Muktarpur Ferry Ghat to Munshiganj Road | 4 | 2.5 |
| 101 | R820 | Zinzira-Keraniganj-Nawabganj-Dohar-Srinagar Road | 71 | 44 |
| 102 | R850 | Tekerhat-Gopalganj (Haridashpur Bridge)-Mollahhat (Gonapara) Road | 45 | 28 |
| 103 | R860 | Mostafapur-Madaripur-Shariatpur (Monohar Bazar)-Ibrahimpur-Harina-Chandpur (Bhatialpur) Road | 68 | 42 |
| 104 | R861 | Monohar Bazar More at R860-Shariatpur Road | 7 | 4.3 |
| 105 | R870 | Barishal-Jhalokati-Rajapur-Bhandaria-Pirojpur Road | 64 | 40 |
| 106 | R880 | Patuakhali-Amtali-Barguna-Kacchira Road | 56 | 35 |
| 107 | R881 | Amtali-Khepupara-Kuakata Road | 41 | 25 |
| 108 | R890 | Bhola (Paran Talukderhat)-Burhanuddin-Lalmohon-Char Fassion-Char Manika Road | 97 | 60 |
| 109 | R891 | Bhola (Illisha Junction)-Illisha Road | 1 | 0.62 |
| 110 | R145 | Lashmipur Town Old Section | 4 | 2.5 |
| 111 | R560 | Paglapir-Dalia-Tista Barrage Road | 57 | 35 |
| 112 | R544 | Santahar Atrai Road | 28 | 17 |
| 113 | R221 | Bir Muktijoddha Commandant Manik Chowdhury Road | 14 | 8.7 |
| 114 | R222 | Shaestaganj (Puranabazar)- Laskarpur Railgate Link Road | 1 | 0.62 |
| 115 | R283 | Sylhet-Sunamganj Bypass Road (3rd Hazrat Shahajalal Bridge Approach Road) | 7 | 4.3 |
| 116 | R248 | Ambarkhana — Shahidgaon — M. C. College — Tilagar Road | 4 | 2.5 |
| 117 | R247 | Shahi Eidgah — Kumarpara — Naiorpul Road | 2 | 1.2 |
| 118 | R249 | Chowhatta — Kumarpara Road | 1 | 0.62 |

== List of zilla (district) roads ==
| S.No. | Road No. | Route | Length (km) | Length (mi) |
|---|---|---|---|---|
| 1 | Z3002 | Dhaka Cantonment V.V.I.P Terminal Road | 5 | 3.1 |
| 2 | Z5069 | Turag-Ruhitpur-Baorvita Road | 24 | 15 |
| 3 | Z3003 | Abdullahpur-Tairmukh-Ulukhola Road | 13 | 8.1 |
| 4 | Z3012 | Uttara-Tairmukh Road | 5 | 3.1 |
| 5 | Z1090 | Majerchar-Mahajampur-Barapa-Rupashi-Majina-Kayetpara Road | 22 | 14 |
| 6 | Z3004 | Mirpur-Pallabi-Dhaur-Kadda Road | 21 | 13 |
| 7 | Z3007 | Zerabo (Tongi-EPZ Road)-Earpur-Diakhali Madrasha Road | 5 | 3.1 |
| 8 | Z8002 | Keraniganj (Konakhola)-Kholamura-Hazratpur-Itavara-Mirpur (Hemayetpur) Road | 23 | 14 |
| 9 | Z3005 | Bhasantek (Cantonment)-Dewanpara-Kalsiberibandh Road | 2 | 1.2 |
| 10 | Z3006 | West end of Mostofa Kamal lines to Pallabi Road | 2 | 1.2 |
| 11 | Z8201 | Kamrangirchar (Purba Rasulpur)-Kurerghat-Shialkhali-Asrafabad-Nuria Madrasha-Keraniganj (Konakhola) Road | 7 | 4.3 |
| 12 | Z8208 | Basilla Bridge approach Road | 2 | 1.2 |
| 13 | Z1101 | Matuail (Mirdabari)-Shampur (Dhaka-Narayanganj Road) Road | 4 | 2.5 |
| 14 | Z1102 | Matuail-New Town-Konapara-Manikandi-Shakerjaiga Road | 7 | 4.3 |
| 15 | Z8202 | Uttar Basilla-Dakshin Basilla Link Road | 2 | 1.2 |
| 16 | Z3025 | Kapashia-Pabur-Fuldi-Kaliganj Road | 24 | 15 |
| 17 | Z3009 | Sripur-Bairagirchala Road | 5 | 3.1 |
| 18 | Z3010 | Kaliganj-Tumulia-Ulukhola Road | 8 | 5.0 |
| 19 | Z3024 | Master Bari-Mirzapur-Pirujali-Nuhashpalli-Mawna Road | 22 | 14 |
| 20 | Z3008 | Board Bazar-Zugitalla-Gazipur Road | 7 | 4.3 |
| 21 | Z2034 | Lakpur-Kamargaon-Gagutia-Katiadi (Motkhola) Road | 23 | 14 |
| 22 | Z3026 | Mawna (M.C Bazar)-Shishupalli Road | 4 | 2.5 |
| 23 | Z5064 | Baniajuri-Zitka-Harirampur Road | 24 | 15 |
| 24 | Z5063 | Golra-Saturia Road | 12 | 7.5 |
| 25 | Z5062 | Kawalipara-Saturia (West Nandeswari) Road | 4 | 2.5 |
| 26 | Z5061 | Kalampur Bus Stand-Kawalipara-Balia-Warsi-Mirzapur Road | 26 | 16 |
| 27 | Z5066 | Shibalay (Nali Bazar)-Nayakandi-Balla-Harirampur (Jhitka) Road | 15 | 9.3 |
| 28 | Z2042 | Narsingdi (Morjal)-Belabo Road | 9 | 5.6 |
| 29 | Z2041 | Narsingdi (Jongi Shibpur)-Raipura Road | 8 | 5.0 |
| 30 | Z2045 | Panchdona (Asmandir Char)-Charsindur (Dulalpur) Road | 19 | 12 |
| 31 | Z2039 | Palas-Ghorashal Road | 11 | 6.8 |
| 32 | Z2044 | Shibpur (Itakhola-Katiadi Regional Highway)-Dulalpur-Lakpur-Monohardi (Hatirdia) Road | 25 | 16 |
| 33 | Z2049 | Manohardi Link Road | 4 | 2.5 |
| 34 | Z2115 | Monohardi (Hatemdi)-Shakerbazar Road | 4 | 2.5 |
| 35 | Z2121 | Puradia-Belabo Road | 8 | 5.0 |
| 36 | Z2047 | Panchdona (Dhaka-Sylhet Highway)-Danga-Palas (Ghorashal) Road | 16 | 9.9 |
| 37 | Z2035 | Shibpur-Daripura-Kamrabo (Belabo) Road | 15 | 9.3 |
| 38 | Z2036 | Shibpur-Bannerbazar-Palas (Taltali) Road | 12 | 7.5 |
| 39 | Z2122 | Nayakandi (Sripur)-Chalakchar (Monohardi)-Shakerbazar Road | 11 | 6.8 |
| 40 | Z2055 | Narsingdi (Darinabipur)-Karimpur-Jagatpur (Bancharampur)-Alokbali Road | 15 | 9.3 |
| 41 | Z2037 | Ghorashal Tan Station-Daladia-Palash (Gabtali)-Fulbaria-Charsindur Road | 15 | 9.3 |
| 42 | Z2038 | Jihastala-Shekherchar Road | 5 | 3.1 |
| 43 | Z2033 | Narsingdi (Arsinagar)-Putia-Shajpur-Bandardia Road | 11 | 6.8 |
| 44 | Z2123 | Monohardi (Kachikata)-Urulia-Bajitpur (Barachapa) Road | 6 | 3.7 |
| 45 | Z2032 | Belabo (Dulalkandi)-Batiban-Kuliarchar (Narayanpur) Road | 5 | 3.1 |
| 46 | Z1089 | Mograpara-Anandabazar Road | 7 | 4.3 |
| 47 | Z1064 | Sonargaon Museum Link Road (Sonargaon Y-Junction-Falk A&C Road) | 2 | 1.2 |
| 48 | Z1061 | Madanganj (Minarbari)-Lalgalbandh Road | 4 | 2.5 |
| 49 | Z1066 | Sonargaon College-Kaikhertek-Nabiganj Road | 8 | 5.0 |
| 50 | Z2063 | Rupganj-Beraid-Badda Road | 17 | 11 |
| 51 | Z1063 | Bhaberchar-Gazaria-Munshiganj Road | 17 | 11 |
| 52 | Z8204 | Megula-Jalalpur-Gobindapur-Tikorpur Road | 12 | 7.5 |
| 53 | Z8004 | Munshiganj (Hatimara)-Kunderbazr-Srinagar (Sanbari) Road | 20 | 12 |
| 54 | Z8205 | Padma By-Pass (Alternative Road of ZKDS Road) | 17 | 11 |
| 55 | Z8206 | Dohar (Nikra)-Tikorpur (Galimpur) Road | 15 | 9.3 |
| 56 | Z8121 | Rakabibazar-Rampal-Digirpar (Tongibari)-Banglabazar-Munshiganj (Nawagaon) Road | 37 | 23 |
| 57 | Z8003 | Srinagar (Hashara)-Alampur-Shibrampur (Sirajdikhan)-Nawabganj (Kharsur) Road | 11 | 6.8 |
| 58 | Z8009 | Dohar (Fultala)-Srinagar (Hashara) Road | 20 | 12 |
| 59 | Z8005 | Rajnagar-Nimtali-Sirajdikhan Road | 14 | 8.7 |
| 60 | Z8203 | Keraniganj (Sayedpur)-Hashara-Birtara-Singpara-Kajalpur-Nagerhat Road | 23 | 14 |
| 61 | Z8207 | Dohar (Bashtala)-Kartikpur-Jhowkanda (Mainut) Road | 8 | 5.0 |
| 62 | Z3031 | Bhaluka-Gafargaon-Hossainpur Road | 31 | 19 |
| 63 | Z3030 | Bhaluka-Shakhipur Road | 26 | 16 |
| 64 | Z3712 | Haluaghat-Munshirhat-Dhobaura Road | 20 | 12 |
| 65 | Z3034 | Trisal-Balipara-Nandail (Kanurampur) Road | 23 | 14 |
| 66 | Z3033 | Mymensingh-Gafargaon-Toke Road | 68 | 42 |
| 67 | Z3032 | Fulbaria-Ashim-Sangkivanga-Bagar Bazar Road | 27 | 17 |
| 68 | Z3035 | Mymensingh-Fulbaria Road | 19 | 12 |
| 69 | Z3711 | Phulpur-Haluaghat-Tinkuni More Road | 25 | 16 |
| 70 | Z4105 | Fulbaria-Muktagachha Road | 16 | 9.9 |
| 71 | Z4015 | Tangail-Delduar Road | 11 | 6.8 |
| 72 | Z4011 | Mirzapur (Gorai)-Shakhipur Road | 27 | 17 |
| 73 | Z4801 | Bhuanpur-Tarakandi Road | 28 | 17 |
| 74 | Z3037 | Bhoradoba-Sagardighi-Ghatail-Bhuanpur Road | 60 | 37 |
| 75 | Z4012 | Korotia-Basail-Shakhipur Road | 36 | 22 |
| 76 | Z4007 | Mirzapur (Pakullah)-Delduar-Elasin Road | 14 | 8.7 |
| 77 | Z4009 | Nagarpur (Duburia)-Salimabad-Chauhali Road | 25 | 16 |
| 78 | Z4016 | Kalihati-Ratanganj-Shakipur Road | 23 | 14 |
| 79 | Z4019 | Ratanganj-Balla Bazar Road | 3 | 1.9 |
| 80 | Z4017 | Ghatail (Porabari)-Shaliajani-Gopalpur-Sarisabari (Jagannathganj) Road | 22 | 14 |
| 81 | Z4607 | Sherpur-Sribardi-Bakshiganj Road | 27 | 17 |
| 82 | Z4617 | Sherpur (Kanashakhola)-Ashtomitala By-Pass Road | 4 | 2.5 |
| 83 | Z4610 | Nakla By-Pass Road | 17 | 11 |
| 84 | Z4609 | Nakla-Shibbari Road | 3 | 1.9 |
| 85 | Z4616 | Sribardi-Viadanga-Jinaigati Road | 19 | 12 |
| 86 | Z4604 | Sherpur (Akher Bazar)-Longorpara-Sribardi (Mamdamari) Road | 12 | 7.5 |
| 87 | Z3040 | Nalitabari-Baruazani-Bagaitala-Haluaghat Road | 16 | 9.9 |
| 88 | Z4603 | Sherpur (Bangaon)-Nunni-Hatipagar Road | 14 | 8.7 |
| 89 | Z4619 | Nalitabari-Papuajuri (Baily Bridge) Road | 8 | 5.0 |
| 90 | Z4602 | Bangaon-Nalitabari Road | 11 | 6.8 |
| 91 | Z4605 | Jhulgaon-Jhenaigati-Sandahkura Road | 13 | 8.1 |
| 92 | Z3616 | Motkhola-Pakundia-Kishoreganj Road | 26 | 16 |
| 93 | Z3603 | Kishoreganj-Karimganj-Chamraghat-Mithamain Road | 37 | 23 |
| 94 | Z3602 | Kishoreganj-Nikli-Moharkona Road | 28 | 17 |
| 95 | Z3608 | Nandail-Atharabari-Kendua Road | 21 | 13 |
| 96 | Z3614 | Atharabari-Rasulpur Road | 6 | 3.7 |
| 97 | Z3601 | Katiadi (Ujanchar)-Bajitpur-Astogram Road | 32 | 20 |
| 98 | Z3609 | Bojra-Kuliarchar Road (Kuliarchar Thana Connecting Road ) | 5 | 3.1 |
| 99 | Z3615 | Trisal (Madhupur Bazar)-Anandaganj-Gouripur (Gazipur) Road | 29 | 18 |
| 100 | Z3623 | Itna-Chamraghat Road | 16 | 9.9 |
| 101 | Z3604 | Kishoreganj-Hossainpur Road | 14 | 8.7 |
| 102 | Z3607 | Nandail Chowrasta-Tarail Road | 16 | 9.9 |
| 103 | Z4021 | Jamalpur-Islampur-Dewanganj Road | 41 | 25 |
| 104 | Z4101 | Jamalpur-Chchua-Muktagachha | 38 | 24 |
| 105 | Z4606 | Jamalpur (Nandibazar)-Dhanua-Kamalpur-Raumari-Datbhanga Road | 87 | 54 |
| 106 | Z4022 | Jamalpur-Madarganj Road | 29 | 18 |
| 107 | Z4023 | Digpaith-Sarisabari-Tarakandi Road | 24 | 15 |
| 108 | Z4104 | Muktagachha-Piarpur Bazar-Karnil Road | 31 | 19 |
| 109 | Z4614 | Bakshiganj-Balugaon-Dewanganj Road | 15 | 9.3 |
| 110 | Z4622 | Islampur Sub-Registrar office-Hakim Chairman Bari-Rishipara Road | 3 | 1.9 |
| 111 | Z4615 | Bakshiganj-Sanandabari-Char Rajibpur Road | 32 | 20 |
| 112 | Z4025 | Jamalpur (Pouro Gate)-Kalibari-Sharisabari (Bausi) Road | 16 | 9.9 |
| 113 | Z3703 | Netrokona (Thakurakona)-Kalmakanda Road | 21 | 13 |
| 114 | Z3707 | Netrokona-Purbadhala-Hugla-Dhobaura Road | 42 | 26 |
| 115 | Z3704 | Susang Durgapur-Birishiri-Purbhadhala-Shamganj Road | 35 | 22 |
| 116 | Z3701 | Netrokona-Madan-Kaliajuri Road | 55 | 34 |
| 117 | Z3713 | Avoipasha-Atpara Road | 7 | 4.3 |
| 118 | Z3706 | Netrokona-Kendua Road | 27 | 17 |
| 119 | Z3709 | Netrokona-Birishiri Road | 26 | 16 |
| 120 | Z3710 | Netrokona-Bishiura-Ishwarganj Road | 27 | 17 |
| 121 | Z1025 | Kumira-Sandwip Road | 13 | 8.1 |
| 122 | Z1021 | Mirsarai-Fatikchhari (Narayanhat) Road | 20 | 12 |
| 123 | Z1617 | Mariamnagar-Ranirhat (Gabtal) Road | 15 | 9.3 |
| 124 | Z1095 | Sarikait-Santoshpur Road (Delwar Khan Road in Sandwip Thana) | 20 | 12 |
| 125 | Z1084 | Muhuriganj-Chattogram Beri Badh Road | 85 | 53 |
| 126 | Z1016 | Fouzderhat-Biman Bnader Road | 20 | 12 |
| 127 | Z1086 | Sitakunda (Baroirdala)-Hazarikhil-Fatikchhari (Haidchakia) Road | 23 | 14 |
| 128 | Z1619 | Raozan (Gahira)-Fatikchhari Road | 24 | 15 |
| 129 | Z1012 | Rangunia (Katakhali)-Raozan Road (Hafez Bazlur Rahaman Road) | 15 | 9.3 |
| 130 | Z1087 | Sitakunda (Barabkunda)-Dala-Dalai-Hathazari (Katirhat) Road | 12 | 7.5 |
| 131 | Z1623 | Raozan (29th km of N106)-Brahmanchhari Road (Shahid Jafar Road) | 15 | 9.3 |
| 132 | Z1636 | Rangunia-Bangalhalia (Sukhbilash) Road (Kalindirani Road) | 15 | 9.3 |
| 133 | Z1629 | Raozan-Noapara (Jalepara) Road | 15 | 9.3 |
| 134 | Z1637 | Domekhali-Madrasha Station Road | 2 | 1.2 |
| 135 | Z1065 | Maizzertek-Boalkhali-Kanongapara-Udarbanna Road | 28 | 17 |
| 136 | Z1802 | Telegati-Allaher Darber Sharif Road | 11 | 6.8 |
| 137 | Z1040 | Gasbaria-Anowara Road | 16 | 9.9 |
| 138 | Z1054 | Barkal Bridge-Barkal Union connecting Road | 3 | 1.9 |
| 139 | Z1804 | Maizzertek-BFDC Fisharies Center Road (Ferry Connecting Road) | 3 | 1.9 |
| 140 | Z1019 | Keranirhat-Gunaigari Road | 19 | 12 |
| 141 | Z1705 | Baharchhara-Beri Band Road (Kazi Basirullah Miazi Road) | 7 | 4.3 |
| 142 | Z1037 | Ghatiadanga-Monufakirhat Road (Shah Jabbaria Road) | 16 | 9.9 |
| 143 | Z1070 | Patiya (Moneswartek)-Anowara (Kasturighat) Road | 16 | 9.9 |
| 144 | Z1071 | Santirhat-Kaliganj Road | 3 | 1.9 |
| 145 | Z1039 | Patiya — Chandanaish (Baltali) Road | 13 | 8.1 |
| 146 | Z1059 | Patiya-Boalkhali (Kanongopara) Road | 12 | 7.5 |
| 147 | Z1057 | Patiya-Annadadatta-Haidgaon-Rangunia Road | 28 | 17 |
| 148 | Z1026 | Khanahat-Dopchhari-Bandarban (Dulupar) Road | 20 | 12 |
| 149 | Z1018 | Shikalbaha-Anwara Road | 9 | 5.6 |
| 150 | Z1703 | Anwara - Tailardwip Ferryghat Road | 6 | 3.7 |
| 151 | Z1036 | Hashimpur-Rail Station-Bagicharhat-Borma Road | 10 | 6.2 |
| 152 | Z1088 | CUFL Gate-Hazrat Mohasin Aulia (R) Mazar-Juidandi Ferry Ghat Road | 17 | 11 |
| 153 | Z1009 | Ramu-Faterkul-Maricha Road | 14 | 8.7 |
| 154 | Z1503 | Maricha (Timchhari)-Ukhia Dakbanglow Road | 20 | 12 |
| 155 | Z1004 | Janatabaza-Gorokghata Road | 27 | 17 |
| 156 | Z1128 | Illasha Bazar-Demusia-Bagguzzara Road | 8 | 5.0 |
| 157 | Z1132 | Khuruskul Bridge-Chowkoldandi-Eidgah Road | 18 | 11 |
| 158 | Z1099 | Teknaf-Shahparirdwip Road | 13 | 8.1 |
| 159 | Z1076 | Kutubdia-Azam Sarak | 20 | 12 |
| 160 | Z1002 | Baraitali-Magnamaghat (Paharchanda) Road | 7 | 4.3 |
| 161 | Z1125 | Ekatabazar-Paharchanda-Pekuabazar-Magnamaghat Road | 19 | 12 |
| 162 | Z1124 | Harbang-Villagerpara-Toitong Road | 28 | 17 |
| 163 | Z1098 | Cox's Bazar-Teknaf Sea beach Road | 86 | 53 |
| 164 | Z1129 | Pir Malek Ghat-Azam Road | 4 | 2.5 |
| 165 | Z1130 | Dulahazra-Garzania-Kasharia-Baisari Road | 26 | 16 |
| 166 | Z1504 | Ukhia-Gundhum Road (Shah Suja Road) | 2 | 1.2 |
| 167 | Z1127 | Lakkharchar-Betua Bazar-Bagguzra Road | 22 | 14 |
| 168 | Z1133 | Whykhong-Shaplapur Road | 10 | 6.2 |
| 169 | Z1126 | Yangcha-Manikpur-Shantirbazar Road | 19 | 12 |
| 170 | Z1131 | Khutakhali-Maheshkhali Road | 4 | 2.5 |
| 171 | Z1613 | Ranirhat-Kawkhali Road | 7 | 4.3 |
| 172 | Z1814 | Bangalhalia-Rajasthali-Farua-Bilaichhari-Barkal Road | 78 | 48 |
| 173 | Z1612 | Bogachhari-Nannerchar-Longadu Road | 38 | 24 |
| 174 | Z1811 | Bandarban-Chimbuk-Thanchi-Alikadam-Baisari-Naikhongchhari-Gundum Road | 180 | 110 |
| 175 | Z1813 | Bandarban-Rowangchhari-Ruma Road | 50 | 31 |
| 176 | Z1812 | Chimbuk-Ruma Road | 34 | 21 |
| 177 | Z1005 | Chiringa (Faisakhali)-Lama-Alikadam Road | 38 | 24 |
| 178 | Z1001 | Ramu-Naikhongchhari Road | 12 | 7.5 |
| 179 | Z1006 | Chimbuk-Tonkabati-Lama Road | 44 | 27 |
| 180 | Z1013 | Tonkabati-Baro Aulia Road | 18 | 11 |
| 181 | Z1007 | Aziznagar-Lama (Gazalia) Road | 29 | 18 |
| 182 | Z1602 | Ramgarh-Jaliapara-Sindukchhari-Mahalchhari Road | 44 | 27 |
| 183 | Z1604 | Khagrachhari-Panchhari Road | 25 | 16 |
| 184 | Z1601 | Manikchahri-Laksmichhari Road | 14 | 8.7 |
| 185 | Z1608 | Matiranga-Tannakapara Road | 45 | 28 |
| 186 | Z1632 | Gourangapara-Panchhari Road | 14 | 8.7 |
| 187 | Z1605 | Dighinala-Chhoto Merung-Chongrachhari-Langadu Road | 40 | 25 |
| 188 | Z1603 | Khagrachhari-Dighinala-Bagaihat-Sajek Road | 68 | 42 |
| 189 | Z1606 | Baghaihat-Marisha Road | 20 | 12 |
| 190 | Z1610 | Dighinala-Babuchhara-Logung-Panchhari Road | 51 | 32 |
| 191 | Z2812 | Beanibazar (Bairagirbazar)-Kurerbazar-Budbaribazar-Badepasha Union-Golapganj (Sharifganj)-Fenchuganj Road | 52 | 32 |
| 192 | Z2014 | Seola-Sutarkandi Road | 4 | 2.5 |
| 193 | Z2831 | Vadeshwar-Mirganj-Fenchuganj Road | 16 | 9.9 |
| 194 | Z2022 | Tajpur-Balaganj Road | 14 | 8.7 |
| 195 | Z2011 | Darbast-Kanaighat-Shahbag Road | 23 | 14 |
| 196 | Z2012 | Shari-Gowainghat Road | 15 | 9.3 |
| 197 | Z2013 | Sylhet (Telikhal)-Sultanpur-Balaganj Road | 25 | 16 |
| 198 | Z2016 | Rashidpur-Biswanath-Rampasha-Lama Kazi Road | 17 | 11 |
| 199 | Z2801 | Sylhet-Salutikar-Companiganj-Bholaganj Road | 37 | 23 |
| 200 | Z2809 | Osmani Biman Bandar Road | 5 | 3.1 |
| 201 | Z8915 | Bagmara-Banglabazar-Daulatkhan Road | 15 | 9.3 |
| 202 | Z8905 | Borhanuddin (Udypur)-Tazumauddin-Manpura-Sikdarhat Road | 38 | 24 |
| 203 | Z8913 | Debirchar-Nazirpur-Lalmohon-Mongolsikder-Tazumuddin Road | 27 | 17 |
| 204 | Z8815 | Amua-Mirukhali-Safa Road | 14 | 8.7 |
| 205 | Z7706 | Nazirpur-Sriramkati-Swarupkati Road | 20 | 12 |
| 206 | Z7710 | Banaripara (Danduat)-Nazirpur Road | 42 | 26 |
| 207 | Z8713 | Kawkhali-Chirapara-Bhitabaria-Bhandaria Road | 16 | 9.9 |
| 208 | Z7711 | Togra-Zianagar-Balipara-Kalaron-Synashi Road | 17 | 11 |
| 209 | Z8806 | Lebukhali-Dumki-Boga-Bauphal-Kalaiya-Dashmina-Galachipa-Amragachhia Road | 87 | 54 |
| 210 | Z8053 | Bauphal (Kalaiya)-Bogi-Bhola (Debirchar) Road | 10 | 6.2 |
| 211 | Z8052 | Kachua-Betagi-Mirjaganj-Patuakhali-Lohalia-Nijbot Kajol-Kalaiya Road | 55 | 34 |
| 212 | Z8066 | Nijbot Kajol-Thakurhat Road | 6 | 3.7 |
| 213 | Z8804 | Galachipa (Haridebpur)-Bhadura-Shakharia Road | 22 | 14 |
| 214 | Z8803 | Barguna (Chandukhali)-Betagi-Bakerganj(Padri Shibpur) Road | 42 | 26 |
| 215 | Z8814 | Barguna (Dakhin Ramna Kheya Ghat)-Dewatala-Mathbaria-Baramasua Road | 30 | 19 |
| 216 | Z8943 | Tajumuddin-Kunjerhat Road | 9 | 5.6 |
| 217 | Z8948 | Fakirhat-Khasherhat Road | 9 | 5.6 |
| 218 | Z8909 | Charfeshion-Betua Road | 7 | 4.3 |
| 219 | Z8916 | Guingerhat-Charpatar School-Dalikherhat-Daulatkhjan Heli Pad-Daulatkhan Bazar Road | 12 | 7.5 |
| 220 | Z8604 | Madaripur-Kalkini-Bhurghata Road | 20 | 12 |
| 221 | Z8011 | Pacchar-Sibchar-Madaripur Road | 34 | 21 |
| 222 | Z8603 | Madaripur (Iterpool)-Pathariar Par-Gosherhat-Dasher-Agailjhara road | 26 | 16 |
| 223 | Z8602 | Shariatpur-Naria Road | 11 | 6.8 |
| 224 | Z8606 | Vojeswar By-Pass Road | 2 | 1.2 |
| 225 | Z8012 | Shariatpur-Janjira-Kawrakandi (Kathalbari) Road | 28 | 17 |
| 226 | Z8601 | Shariatpur (Burirhat)-Goshairhat Road | 16 | 9.9 |
| 227 | Z8605 | Kaneswar-Damudya Road | 4 | 2.5 |
| 228 | Z8065 | Shariatpur-Ganganagar-Mongalmazirghat Road | 26 | 16 |
| 229 | Z7001 | Faridpur (Maizkandi)-Boalmari-Gopalganj (Bhatiapara) Road | 44 | 27 |
| 230 | Z8420 | Bijoypasha-Talarhati-Joynagarghat Road | 6 | 3.7 |
| 231 | Z8021 | Baraitala-Muksudpur Road | 17 | 11 |
| 232 | Z8023 | Garakhola - Kashiani (Bashpur) Road | 7 | 4.3 |
| 233 | Z8504 | Tungipara Thana Complex-Patgati Road | 2 | 1.2 |
| 234 | Z8507 | Bangabandhu Mazar Connecting Road | 0.5 | 0.31 |
| 235 | Z8429 | Tungipara-Patgati By-Pass Road | 2 | 1.2 |
| 236 | Z8414 | Gopalganj-Chapail-Kalia Road | 4 | 2.5 |
| 237 | Z2810 | Companiganj-Chhatak Road | 12 | 7.5 |
| 238 | Z2832 | Daudabad-Daudpur-Vadeswar (Dhaka Dakhin) Road | 23 | 14 |
| 239 | Z2802 | Gobindaganj-Chhatak-Dwarabazar Road | 27 | 17 |
| 240 | Z2804 | Sunamganj-Kanchirghat-Bishambarpur Road | 15 | 9.3 |
| 241 | Z2807 | Madanpur-Dirai-Sullah Road | 46 | 29 |
| 242 | Z2811 | Dowarabazar-Sunamganj Road | 20 | 12 |
| 243 | Z8412 | Bajunia-Gaindasur Road | 13 | 8.1 |
| 244 | Z8419 | Satpar-Ramdia-Fukurah Road | 24 | 15 |
| 245 | Z8408 | Borashi-Parkushali-Singerkul-Borni-Tungipara (Shingipara) Road | 19 | 12 |
| 246 | Z8405 | Faridpur (Goalchamat)-Alipur (Ambikapur)-S.S.Ghat Road | 10 | 6.2 |
| 247 | Z8402 | Faridpur-Hatgazaria-Char Bhadrason-Sadarpur Road | 49 | 30 |
| 248 | Z8416 | Munshibazar - Hatgazaria Alternative Road | 7 | 4.3 |
| 249 | Z8401 | Bhanga (Pukuria)-Sadarpur Road | 11 | 6.8 |
| 250 | Z8404 | Talma-Nagarkanda Road | 12 | 7.5 |
| 251 | Z8406 | Faridpur Town By-Pass | 6 | 3.7 |
| 252 | Z7002 | Sasrail-Alphadanga Road | 4 | 2.5 |
| 253 | Z8067 | Nagarkanda-Bhanga Road | 6 | 3.7 |
| 254 | Z7108 | Goalanda-Faridpur-Tarail Road | 70 | 43 |
| 255 | Z7102 | Rajbari-Baliakandi-Jamalpur-Madhukhali Road | 37 | 23 |
| 256 | Z7106 | Goalonda (Jamtala)-Godarbazar-Pangsha-Habashpur Road | 57 | 35 |
| 257 | Z2834 | Sunamganj-Netrokona-Mymensingh-Sherpur-Jamalpur (Dhanua Kamalpur) Border Road | 171 | 106 |
| 258 | Z2813 | Sunamganj-Tekerhat-Badaghat-Tahirpur Road | 41 | 25 |
| 259 | Z2806 | Niamatpur-Tahirpur Road | 21 | 13 |
| 260 | Z2805 | Dharmapasha-Madayanagar Road | 21 | 13 |
| 261 | Z2003 | Kulaura-Shamshernagar-Srimangal Road | 41 | 25 |
| 262 | Z2823 | Kulaura-Juri-Fultala Road | 21 | 13 |
| 263 | Z2002 | Moulvibazar-Shamshernagar-Chatla Check Post Road | 32 | 20 |
| 264 | Z2822 | Kulaura-Prithmpasha-Hazipur-Sharifpur RoadRoad | 13 | 8.1 |
| 265 | Z2020 | Fenchuganj -Maizgaon-Palbari Road (Fenchuganj link road) | 10 | 6.2 |
| 266 | Z2403 | Habiganj-Baniyachang-Ajmiriganj-Sullah Road | 50 | 31 |
| 267 | Z2009 | Shastaganj Puranbazar-Kalimnagar Road | 3 | 1.9 |
| 268 | Z2405 | Baniachaung-Nabiganj Road | 17 | 11 |
| 269 | Z2008 | Chunarughat-Satuajuri-Natunbazar Road | 13 | 8.1 |
| 270 | Z1043 | Bancharampur-Homna Road | 13 | 8.1 |
| 271 | Z1206 | Companiganj-Nabinagar Road | 26 | 16 |
| 272 | Z1202 | Dharkhar-Akhura-Senarbadi Road | 15 | 9.3 |
| 273 | Z1201 | Kashba-Kuti Road | 9 | 5.6 |
| 274 | Z1042 | Eliotganj-Muradnagar-Ramchandrapur-Bancharampur Road | 46 | 29 |
| 275 | Z2031 | Nabinagar-Ashuganj Road | 19 | 12 |
| 276 | Z1210 | Brahmanbaria-Lalpur Road | 14 | 8.7 |
| 277 | Z1216 | Sultanpur-Chinair-Akhura Road | 10 | 6.2 |
| 278 | Z1048 | Laksam (Daulatganj)-Nagalkoat-Kodalia-Chewara Bazar Road | 32 | 20 |
| 279 | Z1402 | Baburhat-Matlab-Pennai Road | 44 | 27 |
| 280 | Z1053 | Gouripur-Homna Road | 18 | 11 |
| 281 | Z1205 | Companiganj-Muradnagar-Homna Road | 22 | 14 |
| 282 | Z1401 | Lalmai-Barura-Jalam-Adda-Jagatpur Road | 32 | 20 |
| 283 | Z1045 | Chauddagram-Laksam Road | 21 | 13 |
| 284 | Z1414 | Laksam (Sawsan Ghat)-Mudafarganj Road | 8 | 5.0 |
| 285 | Z1407 | Muddafarganj-Chitoshi-Ramganj Road | 29 | 18 |
| 286 | Z1041 | Cumilla-Palpara-Burichang-Brahmanpara-Mirpur Road | 33 | 21 |
| 287 | Z1049 | Mogbari-Bagmara-Bhushchi-Bangadda Road | 19 | 12 |
| 288 | Z1046 | Harishchar-Kashinagar-Miabazar Road | 19 | 12 |
| 289 | Z1029 | Cumilla Cantonment-Barura Road | 14 | 8.7 |
| 290 | Z1221 | Nabipur-Sreekail Road | 16 | 9.9 |
| 291 | Z1220 | Rajachapitala-Ramchandrapur-Patchkitta Road | 17 | 11 |
| 292 | Z1415 | Laksam (Binaighar)-Baiarabazar-Omarganj-Nangalkot Road | 13 | 8.1 |
| 293 | Z1052 | Tomson Bridge-Bard-Kalirbazar-Barura Road | 20 | 12 |
| 294 | Z1008 | Chandina-Debidwar Road | 14 | 8.7 |
| 295 | Z1211 | Dulalpur-Gagutia-Ramkrishnapur-Ramchandrapur Road | 22 | 14 |
| 296 | Z1411 | Khajuria-Pailgachha-Barura Road | 20 | 12 |
| 297 | Z1423 | Pepulia-Lulbaria-Ratanpur-(Chandimura)-Magbari Road | 13 | 8.1 |
| 298 | Z1062 | Daudkandi-Goalmari-Sreerayerchar-Matlab North (Changarchar) Road | 20 | 12 |
| 299 | Z1017 | Chindina (Madhaya)-Maricha-Chapera-Companiganj (Nabipur) Road | 19 | 12 |
| 300 | Z1051 | Changani (Kotbari)-Jungalia-Rajapara-Chaumohoni Road (CTG Old Road) | 10 | 6.2 |
| 301 | Z1022 | Jhalam-Chandina Road | 14 | 8.7 |
| 302 | Z1028 | Nimsar-Barura Road | 13 | 8.1 |
| 303 | Z1219 | Nimsar-Khangsanagar-Burichaung Road | 15 | 9.3 |
| 304 | Z1403 | Chandpur (Nanupur)-Dokanghar-Harina Road | 12 | 7.5 |
| 305 | Z8699 | Chandra-Haimchar Road | 15 | 9.3 |
| 306 | Z1069 | Matlab-Meghna-Dhonagoda-Beriband Road | 62 | 39 |
| 307 | Z1422 | Haziganj-Ramganj-Lakshmipur Road | 37 | 23 |
| 308 | Z1447 | Ramganj By-Pass Road | 1 | 0.62 |
| 309 | Z1044 | Gouripur-Kachua-Hajiganj Road | 41 | 25 |
| 310 | Z1050 | Kaliapara-Kachua Road | 13 | 8.1 |
| 311 | Z1824 | Doabhanga-Shaharasti (Kalibari)-Ramganj (Paniwala) Road | 16 | 9.9 |
| 312 | Z1482 | Bakila-Tekerhat-Janatabazar-Matlab Dakhin (Narayanpur) Road | 16 | 9.9 |
| 313 | Z1445 | Kachua-Gulbahar-Matlab Dakhin (Kashimpur) Road | 20 | 12 |
| 314 | Z1412 | Chandpur-Nanupur-Chandra-Kamtabazar-Ramganj Road | 32 | 20 |
| 315 | Z1430 | Chatkhil-Chitoshi-Shaharasti (Kalibari) Road | 30 | 19 |
| 316 | Z1441 | Sonapur-Kabirhat-Companiganj (Bashurhat)-Daghanbhiya Road | 30 | 19 |
| 317 | Z1424 | Sonapur (Mannan Nagar)-Char Jabber-Steamer Ghat Road | 28 | 17 |
| 318 | Z1439 | Hatiya (Bhuiya Hat)-Jahajmara Road | 34 | 21 |
| 319 | Z1438 | Tamuruddin Link Road | 17 | 11 |
| 320 | Z1421 | Sonaimuri-Senbag-Kallandi Road | 24 | 15 |
| 321 | Z1416 | Kallandi-Chanderhat Road | 9 | 5.6 |
| 322 | Z1448 | Chanderhat-Bashurhat Road | 8 | 5.0 |
| 323 | Z1444 | Feni (Temohoni)-Biroli Bazar-Sonaimuri (Gazirhat) Road | 17 | 11 |
| 324 | Z1405 | Lakshmipur-Char Alaxandar-Sonapur Road | 71 | 44 |
| 325 | Z1429 | Maijdee-Islamia-Uderhat-Dasherhat-New Teariganj-Bhabaniganj Road | 30 | 19 |
| 326 | Z1449 | Dadpurbazar-Khalifarhat Road | 2 | 1.2 |
| 327 | Z1432 | Daserhat-Mandari Road | 9 | 5.6 |
| 328 | Z1508 | Dinmoni Bazar-Moulavibazar-Companirhat-Little Feni River Road | 38 | 24 |
| 329 | Z1420 | Choumohoni-Chhaterpaya Road | 12 | 7.5 |
| 330 | Z1434 | Sonagazi-Olamabazar-Chardarbeshpur-Companiganj Road | 20 | 12 |
| 331 | Z1450 | Old C & B Road | 1 | 0.62 |
| 332 | Z1463 | Lakshmipur (Iterpool)-Dalalbazar-Char Ruhita-Mollarhat-Hajimara-Haiderganj-Raipur Road | 32 | 20 |
| 333 | Z1436 | Paniwala Bazar-Dashgarai Bazar Road | 8 | 5.0 |
| 334 | Z1437 | Batara Bazar Connecting Road | 3 | 1.9 |
| 335 | Z1466 | Nalgara (Raipur-Faridganj Road)-Kamarhat-Ramganj (Fatehpur) Road | 10 | 6.2 |
| 336 | Z1417 | Paniwala-Dalta-Munshihat-Chatkhil (Purbo Bazar) Road | 13 | 8.1 |
| 337 | Z1426 | Chatkhil-Chandraganj Road | 13 | 8.1 |
| 338 | Z1413 | Char Alaxander-Ramgati Road | 13 | 8.1 |
| 339 | Z1510 | Lakshmipur-Dattapara-Chatkhil Road | 28 | 17 |
| 340 | Z1472 | Sardarbari-Khayerhat-Mollaherhat-Raipur Road | 9 | 5.6 |
| 341 | Z1034 | Feni-Sonagazi-Muhuriganj Project Road | 30 | 19 |
| 342 | Z1443 | Feni (Selonia)-Amubhuyerhat-Pratappur-Senbag Road | 13 | 8.1 |
| 343 | Z1033 | Feni-Parsuram-Belonia Road | 25 | 16 |
| 344 | Z1032 | Chhagalnaiya-Muhuriganj Road | 11 | 6.8 |
| 345 | Z1433 | Daganbhuiyan-Taltali Bazar-Choudhurihat-Basurhat Road | 13 | 8.1 |
| 346 | Z1083 | Feni Old Airport Road | 3 | 1.9 |
| 347 | Z1035 | Chhagalnaiya-Parsuram Road (Captain Lik Road) | 21 | 13 |
| 348 | Z1425 | Boktarmunshi-Kazirhat-Daganbhuiyan Road | 16 | 9.9 |
| 349 | Z1081 | Fulgazi (Munshirhat)-Fazilpur Road (K.B Haider Road) | 22 | 14 |
| 350 | Z1030 | Feni (Elahiganj)-Rajapur-Koriashmunshi-Daganbhuiyan (Tutali) Road | 23 | 14 |
| 351 | Z1031 | Feni (Mohhamad Ali Bazar)-Chagalnaiya-Karerhat Road (Dhaka-Chattogram Old Highway) | 36 | 22 |
| 352 | Z1134 | Feni (Masterpara)-Alokdia-Valukdia-Laskerhat-Chagalnaiya (Shantirhat) Road | 16 | 9.9 |
| 353 | Z6851 | Mohanpur-Tanor Road | 13 | 8.1 |
| 354 | Z6006 | Baneswar-Sarda-Charghat-Bagha-Lalpur-Ishwardi Road | 55 | 34 |
| 355 | Z6004 | Puthia-Bagmara Road | 26 | 16 |
| 356 | Z6005 | Shibpur-Durgapur-Taherpur Road | 23 | 14 |
| 357 | Z6809 | Rajshahi-Damkurahat-Kakanhat-Amnura Road | 36 | 22 |
| 358 | Z6853 | Mohonpur-Bagmara (Bhabaniganj) Road | 23 | 14 |
| 359 | Z6010 | Rajshahi-Hatgodagari-Faliarbil-Mohonganj Road | 31 | 19 |
| 360 | Z6018 | Sarda Bazar-Sadipur-Salua Malekher More-Puthia Road | 10 | 6.2 |
| 361 | Z6814 | Baliaghata-Joubon-Boroihata (west) Road | 18 | 11 |
| 362 | Z6815 | Boroihata (East)-Pakrey-Mundumala-Pakerhat-Moyenpur-Tanor Road | 28 | 17 |
| 363 | Z6813 | Godagari-Nachol-Nimatpur Road | 60 | 37 |
| 364 | Z6856 | Manda-Bagmara-Atrai Road | 48 | 30 |
| 365 | Z6855 | Bagshara-Bagdhani-Bildharampur-Chabbisnagar-Palashbari-Gunigram Road | 29 | 18 |
| 366 | Z6852 | Manda-Niamatpur-Shibpur-Porsha Road | 51 | 32 |
| 367 | Z5452 | Joypurhat-Akkelpur-Badalgachhi-Road | 27 | 17 |
| 368 | Z5458 | Matajihat-Chowmashia Road | 16 | 9.9 |
| 369 | Z6810 | Manda Thana link Road (Manda-Prashadpur Road) | 2 | 1.2 |
| 370 | Z5456 | Mahadebpur-Saraigachhi-Porsha (Nitpur) Road | 37 | 23 |
| 371 | Z5464 | Patnitala-Shibpur Road | 10 | 6.2 |
| 372 | Z5469 | Atrai-Singra Road | 26 | 16 |
| 373 | Z5463 | Enayaetpur-Mohadebpur-Patakatahat (Manda) Road | 18 | 11 |
| 374 | Z6803 | Nawabganj-Amnura Road | 12 | 7.5 |
| 375 | Z6806 | Nawabganj-Uttermallick-Gomastapur Road | 26 | 16 |
| 376 | Z6818 | Baragaria-Gohalbari-Jadabpur Kheya Gaht (Nayagola) Road | 6 | 3.7 |
| 377 | Z6805 | Rahonpur-Bholahati BDR Camp Road | 29 | 18 |
| 378 | Z6819 | Boalia-Chowdhala Road | 8 | 5.0 |
| 379 | Z6802 | Kansat-Gomostapur-Rohonpur (Bhangabari) Road | 31 | 19 |
| 380 | Z6801 | Nawabganj-Sibganj-Kansat-Sonamasjid-Baliadighi Check Post Road | 38 | 24 |
| 381 | Z6816 | Shibganj By-Pass Road | 5 | 3.1 |
| 382 | Z6817 | Nachol-Gomastapur (Rohonpur) Road | 16 | 9.9 |
| 383 | Z6021 | Chatmohor-Bhungura-Faridpur-Bagabari Road | 38 | 24 |
| 384 | Z6033 | Bhangura Upazila Connecting Road | 10 | 6.2 |
| 385 | Z6034 | Faridpur Upazila Connecting Road | 3 | 1.9 |
| 386 | Z6026 | Madhpur-Santhia-Bera Road | 22 | 14 |
| 387 | Z6030 | Ataikula (Pabna-Natore Highway)-Sujanagar Road | 11 | 6.8 |
| 388 | Z6024 | Chinakhora (Pabna-Nagarbari National Highway)-Sujanagar Road | 11 | 6.8 |
| 389 | Z6031 | Chatmohor-Parshadanga-Edilpur-Dangergaon-Pabna Road | 32 | 20 |
| 390 | Z6017 | Chinakhora-Biswa Road-Khatupara-Bilmohisha-Santhia Road | 14 | 8.7 |
| 391 | Z6028 | Satiakhola-Manpur-Huikhali-Kalayanpur-Chabbismile Biswa Road | 12 | 7.5 |
| 392 | Z5401 | Sirajganj-Kazipur-Dhunat-Sherpur Road | 55 | 34 |
| 393 | Z5402 | Sirajganj-Kadda-Samespur Road | 12 | 7.5 |
| 394 | Z5410 | Enayetpur-Shahazadpur Road | 16 | 9.9 |
| 395 | Z5041 | Raiganj (Bhuiyagati)-Nimgachhi-Taras Road | 17 | 11 |
| 396 | Z5406 | Porabari-Kamarkhanda (Jamtoil)-Nalka Road | 16 | 9.9 |
| 397 | Z6032 | Taras-Hamkuria Road | 10 | 6.2 |
| 398 | Z5047 | Shahazadpur-Kaizuri-Chauhali Road | 16 | 9.9 |
| 399 | Z5409 | Saidabad-Enayetpur-Khaja Yunis Ali Medical College Hospital Road | 20 | 12 |
| 400 | Z5408 | Kadda-Khamarkhand-Belkuchi (Tamai) Road | 8 | 5.0 |
| 401 | Z5046 | Ullahpara-Purnimagati-Taras Road | 27 | 17 |
| 402 | Z5042 | Sirajganj-Raiganj (Chandaikona) Road | 21 | 13 |
| 403 | Z5405 | Sirajganj (Bagbati)-Dhunat (Sonamukhi) Road | 25 | 16 |
| 404 | Z5049 | Taras-Raniraht-Sherpur Road | 38 | 24 |
| 405 | Z5043 | Taras-Gurudaspur Road | 22 | 14 |
| 406 | Z5403 | Kaliakandapara-Kamarkhanda-Ullahpara (Bhutgachha) Road | 18 | 11 |
| 407 | Z5058 | Ullahpara-Belkuchi Road | 16 | 9.9 |
| 408 | Z5404 | Sirajganj (Pepulbaria)-Dhunat (Sonamukhi) Road | 15 | 9.3 |
| 409 | Z5048 | Ullapara-Lahiri-Mohonpur-Bhangura Road | 20 | 12 |
| 410 | Z6014 | Bonpara-Gopalpur-Lalpur Road | 19 | 12 |
| 411 | Z6015 | Ahamadpur-Baraigram-Gurudaspur Road | 23 | 14 |
| 412 | Z5210 | Kaliganj (Sherkul)-Naldangerhat-Sarkutia Bazar Road | 26 | 16 |
| 413 | Z6022 | Ishwardi-Kadamchilan (Pabna-Natore Highway) Road | 17 | 11 |
| 414 | Z6029 | Baraigram Thana-Zonail-Chatmohor Road | 18 | 11 |
| 415 | Z5211 | Natore (Dalsarak)-Bildahar-Gurudaspur Road | 31 | 19 |
| 416 | Z6011 | Lalpur (Walia)-Dayarampur (Bagatipara)-Sonapur-Shankerbagerhat-Natore Road | 22 | 14 |
| 417 | Z5208 | Singra-Baruhas-Taras Road | 26 | 16 |
| 418 | Z6019 | Puthia-Arani-Bagha Road | 21 | 13 |
| 419 | Z6020 | Arani-Bagatipara Road | 10 | 6.2 |
| 420 | Z5209 | Singra-Gurudaspur-Chatmohor Road | 49 | 30 |
| 421 | Z5025 | Rangpur-Badarganj-Parbatipur-Dinajpur Road | 66 | 41 |
| 422 | Z5024 | Modhupur-Shampur Road | 8 | 5.0 |
| 423 | Z5014 | Rangpur Cantonment-Ghagat Bridge Road | 3 | 1.9 |
| 424 | Z5010 | Rangpur-Shahebganj-Mahiganj-Pirgachha Road | 28 | 17 |
| 425 | Z5612 | Shahebganj-Haragachha Road | 8 | 5.0 |
| 426 | Z5074 | Dhaka-Rangpur Highway N5 to Pirganj Road | 2 | 1.2 |
| 427 | Z5020 | Hazirhat (Rangpur-Sayedpur Highway)-Betgari-Langalerhat-Gangachhara Road | 20 | 12 |
| 428 | Z5075 | Sadullahpur (Madarganj)-Pirganj-Nawabganj (Jaintapur) Road | 33 | 21 |
| 429 | Z5018 | Gangachhara-Pirerhat-Monthanahat-Garagram-Nilphamari (Kishoreganj) Road | 30 | 19 |
| 430 | Z5015 | Taxerhat-Laldighi-Taraganj-Kishoreganj Road | 28 | 17 |
| 431 | Z5023 | Rangapur-Gangachhara Road | 12 | 7.5 |
| 432 | Z5554 | Gaibandha-Nakaihat-Gobindaganj Road | 28 | 17 |
| 433 | Z5552 | Gaibandha-Phulchhari-Varathkhali-Saghata Road | 29 | 18 |
| 434 | Z5613 | Gaibandah-Sunderganj-Pirgachha (Kadamtali) Road | 59 | 37 |
| 435 | Z5476 | Dhupni-Belka Road | 3 | 1.9 |
| 436 | Z5558 | Gaibandha City By-Pass Road | 8 | 5.0 |
| 437 | Z5555 | Gaibandha-Balashighat Road | 8 | 5.0 |
| 438 | Z5559 | Balashighat-Sayedpur Road | 1 | 0.62 |
| 439 | Z5551 | Dariapur-Kamarzani Road | 7 | 4.3 |
| 440 | Z5553 | Gaibandha-Sadullahpur Road | 11 | 6.8 |
| 441 | Z5852 | Palashbari-Goraghat Road | 9 | 5.6 |
| 442 | Z5622 | Kurigram-Nageswari-Bhurungamari Road | 47 | 29 |
| 443 | Z5621 | Kurigram-Ulipur-Chillmari Road | 30 | 19 |
| 444 | Z5614 | Kurigram-Rajarhat Road | 7 | 4.3 |
| 445 | Z5611 | Rajarhat-Teesta Road | 11 | 6.8 |
| 446 | Z5623 | Ulipur-Bojra-Chillmari Road | 16 | 9.9 |
| 447 | Z5617 | Nageswari-Newasi-Kharibari-Fulbari Road | 19 | 12 |
| 448 | Z5624 | Bhurungamari-Sonahat land port-Madarganj-Bhitarband-Nageswari Road | 47 | 29 |
| 449 | Z5616 | Nageswari-Kularhat (Fulbari)-Kauwahaga-Kashipur-Lalmonirhat Road | 40 | 25 |
| 450 | Z5901 | Lalmonirhat-Phulbari Road | 14 | 8.7 |
| 451 | Z5902 | Lalmonirhat-Haragachha Road | 5 | 3.1 |
| 452 | Z5904 | Patgram By-Pass Road | 3 | 1.9 |
| 453 | Z5903 | Patgram-Dohagram-Angarpota Sit Mohal Road | 18 | 11 |
| 454 | Z5907 | Lalmonirhat-Mogalhat Landport Road | 12 | 7.5 |
| 455 | Z5053 | Kahalu Thana Connecting Road | 11 | 6.8 |
| 456 | Z5035 | Mokamtala (Bogura-Rangpur National Highway)-Sonatala-Harikhali-Hatsherpur-Sariakandi Road | 41 | 25 |
| 457 | Z5507 | Mokamtala (Kashipur)-Guzia-Shibganj (Amtali) Road | 10 | 6.2 |
| 458 | Z5032 | Bogura-Sariakandi Road | 21 | 13 |
| 459 | Z5071 | Borobila-Vanderbari Road | 5 | 3.1 |
| 460 | Z5040 | Sultanganj (Lichutala)-Madla-Bagbari (Kadamtala)-Gabtali (Pachmile) Road | 16 | 9.9 |
| 461 | Z5072 | Dhunot-Nanglu-Baliadighi-Poradah-Patch Mile-Gabtali-Pirgachha-Mokamtala (Chowkirghat) Road | 52 | 32 |
| 462 | Z5050 | Bagbari-Nanglu Road | 3 | 1.9 |
| 463 | Z5073 | Prothomachew-Pirgachha-Matidali Road | 19 | 12 |
| 464 | Z5459 | Nasratpur-Murail-Raikhali-Beragram Road | 16 | 9.9 |
| 465 | Z5467 | Raikali-Tilokpur Road | 8 | 5.0 |
| 466 | Z5505 | Mahashastan (Bogura-Rangpur National Highway)-Shibganj-Amtoli Road | 9 | 5.6 |
| 467 | Z5202 | Nandigram (Omarpur)-Talora-Dhupchachhia-Zianagar-Akkelpur (Gopinathpur) Road | 45 | 28 |
| 468 | Z5207 | Nandigram (Katham)-Kaliganj-Raninagar Road | 42 | 26 |
| 469 | Z5051 | Baiguni-Durgahata-Poradah Road | 10 | 6.2 |
| 470 | Z5472 | Adamdighi-Santahar Sailo-Raninagar Road | 12 | 7.5 |
| 471 | Z5034 | Sherpur-Kaigari-Nandigram Road | 17 | 11 |
| 472 | Z5039 | Bogura (Jhapgari)-Khetlal Road | 31 | 19 |
| 473 | Z5471 | Kahalu-Panchpir-Dolahar-Choumohoni-Adamdighi (Bagdaha) Road | 21 | 13 |
| 474 | Z5501 | Joypurhat-Khetlal Road | 4 | 2.5 |
| 475 | Z5504 | Joypurhat By-Pass Road | 7 | 4.3 |
| 476 | Z5508 | Khetlal-Gopinathpur-Akkelpur Road | 18 | 11 |
| 477 | Z5503 | Joypurhat-Panchbibi-Hili Road | 22 | 14 |
| 478 | Z5855 | Joypurhat-Rajabirat-Gobindaganj Road | 31 | 19 |
| 479 | Z5478 | Akkelpur-Tilokpur-Santhahar Road | 20 | 12 |
| 480 | Z5509 | Hili-Shalaipur-Kalai Road | 32 | 20 |
| 481 | Z5856 | Panchbibi-Dugdugi-Goraghat Road | 28 | 17 |
| 482 | Z5801 | Kholahati Cantonment Road | 1 | 0.62 |
| 483 | Z5002 | Thakurgaon-Nekmand-Pirganj-Birganj Road | 78 | 48 |
| 484 | Z5029 | Nekmand-Dharmagarh Road | 10 | 6.2 |
| 485 | Z5803 | Dinajpur-Birol Road | 12 | 7.5 |
| 486 | Z5006 | Dinajpur-Bochaganj-Bakultala Road | 34 | 21 |
| 487 | Z5007 | Birganj-Kaharol Road | 9 | 5.6 |
| 488 | Z5011 | Sayedpur-Parbatipur Road | 13 | 8.1 |
| 489 | Z5008 | Birganj-Khansama-Darwani Road | 27 | 17 |
| 490 | Z5005 | Khansama-Ranirbandar Road | 15 | 9.3 |
| 491 | Z5804 | Chirirbandar-Amtali Bazar-Amtali Simantha Fari Road | 16 | 9.9 |
| 492 | Z5561 | Madhayapara-Aftabganj-Nawabganj Road | 18 | 11 |
| 493 | Z5857 | Fulbari-Parbatipur Road | 23 | 14 |
| 494 | Z5854 | Birampur (Bijon)-Hakimpur Road | 11 | 6.8 |
| 495 | Z5851 | Birampur-Nawabganj-Bhaduria Road | 23 | 14 |
| 496 | Z5802 | Dinajpur-Khanpur Road | 13 | 8.1 |
| 497 | Z5004 | Ranishankoil-Haripur Road | 18 | 11 |
| 498 | Z5055 | Thakurgaon-Pirganj Road | 22 | 14 |
| 499 | Z5059 | Thakurgaon-Ruhea Road | 16 | 9.9 |
| 500 | Z5001 | Panchagarh-Goalpara-Ruhea Road | 27 | 17 |
| 501 | Z5003 | Boda-Debiganj-Domar Road | 30 | 19 |
| 502 | Z5060 | Bhajanpur (Nijbari)-Atarkhari-Mainaguri-Mirganj Road | 19 | 12 |
| 503 | Z5021 | Panchagarh Sugarmill-Benghari-Maria-Saldanga-Debiganj Road | 33 | 21 |
| 504 | Z5707 | Nilphamari-Domar Road | 21 | 13 |
| 505 | Z5701 | Nilphamari-Jaldhaka Road | 21 | 13 |
| 506 | Z5022 | Nilphamari (Tengonmari)-Kishoreganj Road | 10 | 6.2 |
| 507 | Z5703 | Jaldhaka-Dimla-Tunirhat Road | 29 | 18 |
| 508 | Z5054 | Boragarirhat-Khoksharhat-Dimla Road | 11 | 6.8 |
| 509 | Z5709 | Nilphamari By-Pass Road | 8 | 5.0 |
| 510 | Z5706 | Domar-Chilahati-Volaganj Road | 29 | 18 |
| 511 | Z7041 | Khulna (Rupsha)-Srifaltala-Terokhada Road | 22 | 14 |
| 512 | Z7042 | Srifaltala-Senerbazar Road | 4 | 2.5 |
| 513 | Z7606 | Gollamari-Batiaghata-Dacope-Nalian Forest Road | 54 | 34 |
| 514 | Z7043 | Fultala-Shahapur-Miximil-Dumuria Road | 29 | 18 |
| 515 | Z7040 | Fulbari Railgate-Dighalia (Ngarghata)-Arua-Gazirhat-Terokhada Road | 29 | 18 |
| 516 | Z7047 | Terakhada-Barnal-Kalia Road | 14 | 8.7 |
| 517 | Z7045 | Terakhada-Mollahat Road | 21 | 13 |
| 518 | Z7610 | Koyra-Noabaki-Shamnagar Road | 40 | 25 |
| 519 | Z7604 | Betgram-Tala-Paikgachha-Koyra Road | 65 | 40 |
| 520 | Z7615 | Dacope-Barobaria-Magurkhali-Tala Road | 30 | 19 |
| 521 | Z7603 | Satkhira-Asasuni-Goaldanga-Paikgachha Road | 52 | 32 |
| 522 | Z7607 | Satkhira (Shakhipur)-Debhata Road | 5 | 3.1 |
| 523 | Z7613 | Tala-Islamkati-Sujanshaha-Satkhira (Patkelghata) Road | 10 | 6.2 |
| 524 | Z7617 | Kaliganj-Shyamnagar-Vetkhali Road | 28 | 17 |
| 525 | Z7609 | Banshipur-Munshiganj road | 11 | 6.8 |
| 526 | Z7602 | Satkhira-Shakhipur-Kaliganj Road | 36 | 22 |
| 527 | Z7552 | keshabpur- sharaskhati -kalarawa Road | 20 | 12 |
| 528 | Z7618 | Ashasuni-shamnagar Road | 35 | 22 |
| 529 | Z7708 | Bagerhat-Chitolmari Road | 22 | 14 |
| 530 | Z7703 | Bagerhat (Signboard)-Kachua Road | 7 | 4.3 |
| 531 | Z7801 | Chitalmari-Fakirhat (Faltita) Road | 24 | 15 |
| 532 | Z7702 | Signboard-Morelganj-Sharankhola-Rainda-Bogi Road | 57 | 35 |
| 533 | Z7705 | Morelganj Ferryghat-Zianagar (Togra Ferryghat) Road | 13 | 8.1 |
| 534 | Z7719 | Bagerhat Circuit House-Dewanbati-Khegraghat-Karapara Road | 2 | 1.2 |
| 535 | Z7717 | Bagerhat-Rampal -Mongla Road | 34 | 21 |
| 536 | Z7701 | Morelganj (CARE Bazar) -Mongla Road | 26 | 16 |
| 537 | Z7054 | Chitalmari-Tungipara (Patgati) Road | 16 | 9.9 |
| 538 | Z7718 | Kachua (Pingoria)-Talighati-Herma-Rampal Road | 42 | 26 |
| 539 | Z7716 | Nazirpur-Kuchua Road | 15 | 9.3 |
| 540 | Z7501 | Bagherpara link Road | 4 | 2.5 |
| 541 | Z7031 | Churamonkathi-Chaugachha Road | 16 | 9.9 |
| 542 | Z7551 | Monirampur-Jikorgachha Road | 17 | 11 |
| 543 | Z7050 | Jashore Cantonment-Shadinata Sharini Road | 1 | 0.62 |
| 544 | Z7553 | Keshabpur -Betgram Road | 32 | 20 |
| 545 | Z7048 | Prembag-Dakuria-Sundali Bazar Road | 17 | 11 |
| 546 | Z7057 | Kaligang-Khajura-Raipur-Bagharpara Road | 33 | 21 |
| 547 | Z7058 | Sutighata-Dakuria Road | 12 | 7.5 |
| 548 | Z7059 | Bolianpur-Kuada Road | 1 | 0.62 |
| 549 | Z7619 | Modhanpur College More-Trimohoni Bazar Road | 20 | 12 |
| 550 | Z7049 | Prembag-Bahirghat Road | 6 | 3.7 |
| 551 | Z7505 | Narail Town By-Pass Road | 6 | 3.7 |
| 552 | Z7503 | Narail-Lohagara Bazar-Naragati Road | 38 | 24 |
| 553 | Z7502 | Narail-Kalia Road | 25 | 16 |
| 554 | Z7030 | Narail-Fultala Road | 25 | 16 |
| 555 | Z7506 | Lohagara-Nahata-Kalishankarpur-Mohammadpur Road | 48 | 30 |
| 556 | Z7504 | Narail (Tularampur)-Maijpara-Shalika Road | 20 | 12 |
| 557 | Z7021 | Arpara-Kaliganj Road | 30 | 19 |
| 558 | Z7012 | Magura-Mohammadpur Road | 25 | 16 |
| 559 | Z7201 | Arpara-Salikha Road | 12 | 7.5 |
| 560 | Z7011 | Magura-Sripur Road | 14 | 8.7 |
| 561 | Z7007 | Ramnagar-Hazratala-Sripur Road | 16 | 9.9 |
| 562 | Z7008 | Sripur-Langalbandh-Wapdah More Road | 36 | 22 |
| 563 | Z7457 | Jhenaidah-Harinakunda Road | 20 | 12 |
| 564 | Z7023 | Khalishpur-Maheshpur-Dattanagar-Jinnanagar-Jadabpur Road | 49 | 30 |
| 565 | Z7405 | Shekhpara-Shailkupa-Langalbandh Road | 27 | 17 |
| 566 | Z7024 | Gopalpur-Talsar Bazar-Kotchandpur-Azampur-Maheshpur Road | 27 | 17 |
| 567 | Z7460 | Dakbanglabazar-Gopalpur-Kaliganj Road | 23 | 14 |
| 568 | Z7404 | Amtali-Tailtupi-Alamdanga Road | 56 | 35 |
| 569 | Z7488 | Nayanipara-Joluli-Jadabpur-Gopalpur Road | 21 | 13 |
| 570 | Z7489 | Chandpara-Talina-Jalalpur-Talsar Bazar-Drolaxmipur-Khalishpur Road | 39 | 24 |
| 571 | Z7411 | Bheramara-Daulatpur Road | 21 | 13 |
| 572 | Z7452 | Gangni-Kathuli-Kulbaria Road | 20 | 12 |
| 573 | Z7451 | 8th km of Kushtia-Meherpur Highway to Miupur Thana Connecting Road | 2 | 1.2 |
| 574 | Z7409 | Bheramara Rail Station-Bheramara Ferry Ghat Road | 6 | 3.7 |
| 575 | Z7464 | Sadarpur-Jutiadanga-Ashannagar-Hatbolia Road | 16 | 9.9 |
| 576 | Z7105 | Ishwardi-Paikpara-Mirzapur-Fultala More-Singra-Fulbaria-Bhabaniganj Road | 11 | 6.8 |
| 577 | Z7463 | Bheramara (GK Bandh 3no Bridge)- Mirpur Thana Road | 9 | 5.6 |
| 578 | Z7461 | Mirpur-Shehala-Pragpur BDR Camp Road | 35 | 22 |
| 579 | Z7465 | Sadarpur Bazar-Halsha Rail Bazar Road | 18 | 11 |
| 580 | Z7412 | Daulatpur-Daulatkhali-Mathurapur High School Bazar Road | 12 | 7.5 |
| 581 | Z7466 | Meherpur-North Shalikha-Kaligangni Road | 13 | 8.1 |
| 582 | Z7468 | Chandpur-Dargatala-Jadukhali-Jatarpur Road | 21 | 13 |
| 583 | Z7467 | Amjhupi-Madandanga-Shampur-Noapara Road | 11 | 6.8 |
| 584 | Z7456 | Bamundi-Hatboalia-Alamdanga Road | 24 | 15 |
| 585 | Z8031 | Gouranadi-Paisarhat-Kotalipara-Gopalganj Road | 47 | 29 |
| 586 | Z8049 | Agailjhara By-Pass Road | 5 | 3.1 |
| 587 | Z8038 | Shikarpur-Uzirpur Road | 7 | 4.3 |
| 588 | Z8043 | Hizla-Mehindiganj-Barishal Road | 42 | 26 |
| 589 | Z8034 | Rahamatpur-Babuganj-Muladi-Hizla Road | 37 | 23 |
| 590 | Z8810 | Bakerganj-Padrishibpur-Kathaltali-Subidkhali-Barguna Road | 57 | 35 |
| 591 | Z8037 | Barishal-Karapur-Nabagram-Swarupkathi Road | 34 | 21 |
| 592 | Z8044 | Barishal (Dinerpool)-Laxmipasha-Dumki Road | 32 | 20 |
| 593 | Z8040 | Barishal (Beltala)-Shaistabad-Fakirbari (Sarikol) Road | 30 | 19 |
| 594 | Z8910 | Barishal (Bairagirpool)-Tumchar-Bauphaul Road | 35 | 22 |
| 595 | Z8702 | Rajapur-Naikati-Bekutia-Pirojpur Road | 15 | 9.3 |
| 596 | Z8705 | Bhandaria-Paikhkhali-Kathalia Road | 12 | 7.5 |
| 597 | Z8703 | Jhalokati (Dhanshiri)-Kawkhali Road | 11 | 6.8 |
| 598 | Z8709 | Satpakhia (Barishal-Jhalokati Highway)-Nalcity Road | 3 | 1.9 |
| 599 | Z8708 | Rajapur-Kathalia-Amua-Bamna-Patharghata Road | 76 | 47 |
| 600 | Z8706 | Centrehat-Paikkhali Road | 8 | 5.0 |
| 601 | Z8056 | Dapdapia-Nalcity-Mollaherhat (Moheshpur) Road (Z.A Bhutto Road) | 26 | 16 |
| 602 | Z8054 | Nalchity-Ponabalia-Jhalokati Road | 7 | 4.3 |
| 603 | Z8058 | Nalchity-Pir Moazzam Hossain Road | 16 | 9.9 |
| 604 | Z8062 | Pir Moazzem Hossain (Baisakia)- Rajapur (Mirerhat) Road | 7 | 4.3 |
| 605 | Z8704 | Jhalokati-Nabagram-Gava-Ekshirapara Road | 19 | 12 |
| 606 | Z8716 | Jhalokati-Kirtipasha-Swarupkati Road | 19 | 12 |
| 607 | Z8711 | Bhandaria-Banaihat Road | 9 | 5.6 |
| 608 | Z8717 | Naikati-Bhandaria Road | 14 | 8.7 |
| 609 | Z8047 | Bakerkati-Nalchity Road | 10 | 6.2 |
| 610 | Z8740 | Kathalia (Bandaghata)-Kaikhali-Banaihat Road | 8 | 5.0 |
| 611 | Z8033 | Gariarpar-Banaripara-Sawrupkati-Kawkhali-Naikati Road | 48 | 30 |
| 612 | Z8048 | Chaker-Banaripara Road | 9 | 5.6 |
| 613 | Z8750 | Shekerhat connecting Road | 10 | 6.2 |
| 614 | Z7709 | Priojpur Kheya Ghat-Hularhat Road | 6 | 3.7 |
| 615 | Z7704 | Pirojpur-Nazirpur-Matibhanga-Patgati-Gonapara Road | 51 | 32 |
| 616 | Z7715 | Pirojpur-Nazirpur By-Pass Road | 3 | 1.9 |
| 617 | Z8701 | Charkhali-Tushkhali-Mathbaria-Patharghata Road | 56 | 35 |
| 618 | Z5704 | Domar (Boragarihat) - Jaldhaka (Bhadur Dargha) Road | 14 | 8.7 |
| 619 | Z5070 | Gabtali Swarighat Road | 12 | 7.5 |
| 620 | Z3617 | Pakundia - Toke Bazar Road | 12 | 7.5 |
| 621 | Z8430 | Tungipara - Kotalipara (Majbadi) Road | 20 | 12 |
| 622 | Z8607 | Naria - Pathanbadi- Nayan - Matbarkandi - Dagri - Shaora Road | 20 | 12 |
| 623 | Z4018 | Baushi - Gopalpur - Bhuapur Road | 56 | 35 |
| 624 | Z8608 | Tekerhat (Highway Point) - Dattapara - Surjanagar Road | 28 | 17 |
| 625 | Z1047 | HarishChar- Bijrabazar Road | 8 | 5.0 |
| 626 | Z2010 | Murarbandh Dargahsharif Road | 2 | 1.2 |
| 627 | Z1620 | Nazir Hat - Maijbhandar Road | 5 | 3.1 |
| 628 | Z1618 | Bhatiari - Hathajari Road | 12 | 7.5 |
| 629 | Z5019 | Police Line- Jalkar- Sothapir- Pakkar Matha Road | 4 | 2.5 |
| 630 | Z3036 | Saheb Ali Road | 2 | 1.2 |
| 631 | Z3038 | Town Hall-Ganginarpar-Relir more Road | 2 | 1.2 |
| 632 | Z3039 | Charpara-Patgudham Road | 1 | 0.62 |
| 633 | Z7458 | Garaganj-Shailkupa Road | 6 | 3.7 |
| 634 | Z7845 | Jashore (Pulerhat)- Rajganj- Sagardari- Kumira Road | 48 | 30 |
| 635 | Z7552 | Keshabpur- Trimohoni- Saraskathi- Kalaroa Road | 20 | 12 |
| 636 | Z7553 | Keshabpur (Bhagati Baisa) -Chinra Bazar- Sagardari- Betgram (18 Miles) Road | 31 | 19 |
| 637 | Z7554 | Keshabpur- Sagardari Madhu Sarak | 13 | 8.1 |

== Major bridges in Bangladesh ==
Bridges longer than 400 metres (1,300 ft)
| Name of Bridge | Name of Road | Length (m) | Length (ft) |
|---|---|---|---|
| Padma bridge | Dhaka—Mawa—Bhanga Expressway | 6,150 | 20,180 |
| Jamuna Bridge | Dhaka—North Bengal Highway | 4,800 | 15,700 |
| Lalon Shah Bridge | Rajshahi—Khulna Highway | 1,786 | 5,860 |
| Meghna-Gumti Bridge | Dhaka — Chattogram Highway | 1,408 | 4,619 |
| Khan Jahan Ali Bridge | Khulna City Bypass Highway | 1,360 | 4,460 |
| Syed Nazrul Islam (Bhairab) Bridge | Dhaka — Sylhet Highway | 1,194 | 3,917 |
| 2nd Buriganga Bridge | Dhaka — Keraniganj | 1,016 | 3,333 |
| Shah Amanat Bridge | Chattogram — Cox's Bazar Highway | 950 | 3,120 |
| Meghna Bridge | Dhaka — Chattogram Highway | 930 | 3,050 |
| Gabkhan Bridge | Barishal — Jhalokathi | 918 | 3,012 |
| 1st Bangladesh China Friendship (Postagola) Bridge | Dhaka—Mawa—Bhanga Expressway | 848 | 2,782 |
| Dharala Bridge (Kurigram) | Kurigram —Bhurungamari | 657 | 2,156 |
| Kaliganga Bridge | Dhaka — Manikganj — Aricha | 647 | 2,123 |
| Daratana Bridge | Noapara — Pirojpur | 631 | 2,070 |
| Gorai Bridge | Faridpur — Jashore | 621 | 2,037 |
| Karotoa Bridge | Boda — Debiganj | 572 | 1,877 |
| Baghabari Bridge | Pabna — Sirajganj | 570 | 1,870 |
| Dholeshwari Bridge | Dhaka — Aricha | 507 | 1,663 |
| Mir Mosharraf Hosain Bridge | Rajbari — Kushtia | 505 | 1,657 |
| Hazi Shariatullah Bridge | Mawa — Faridpur | 456 | 1,496 |
| Shambhuganj Bridge | Mymensingh — Haluaghat | 453 | 1,486 |
| Sonahat Bridge | Bhurungamari — Sonahat land port | 445 | 1,460 |
| Mahananda Bridge | Rajshahi — Nawabganj | 441 | 1,447 |
| Brahmaputra Bridge | Dhaka — Sylhet | 429 | 1,407 |
| Teesta Bridge | Lalmonirhat — Rangpur | 800 | 2,600 |

== See also ==
- List of roads in Dhaka
