= N114 (Bangladesh) =

Road in Bangladesh

N114
- Comilla–Brahmanbaria bypass highway

Route information
- Maintained by Bangladesh Road Transport Authority

Major junctions
- From: Fouzdari square, Comilla
- To: Sayedabad, Kasba Upazila

Location
- Country: Bangladesh

Highway system
- Roads in Bangladesh
← N120	→ N102

The N114 is one of the main transportation artery in Bangladesh, between Comilla and kasba Upazila of Brahmanbaria. It works as a bypass highway. The highway is known along various stretches as Comilla-Brahmanbaria bypass highway.

== Route description ==
This highway, connecting Comilla and Brahmanbaria districts of Chittagong Division, runs approximately 39.96 kilometres (24.83 mi) from Fouzdari Square, Comilla, to Sayedabad, Kasba.

The highway cuts through the Burichang, Brahmanpara in Comilla district and Kasba in Brahmanbaria district.

At 28.67 kilometres (17.81 mi) in length, the Comilla section of the highway starts from Fouzdari area of Comilla city.

At 11.29 kilometres (7.02 mi) in length, the Brahmanbaria section of the highway starts from Bagra, Connecting with N102 (Bangladesh) at Sayedabad, Kasba.
