= N309 (Bangladesh) =

National highway of Bangladesh

N309

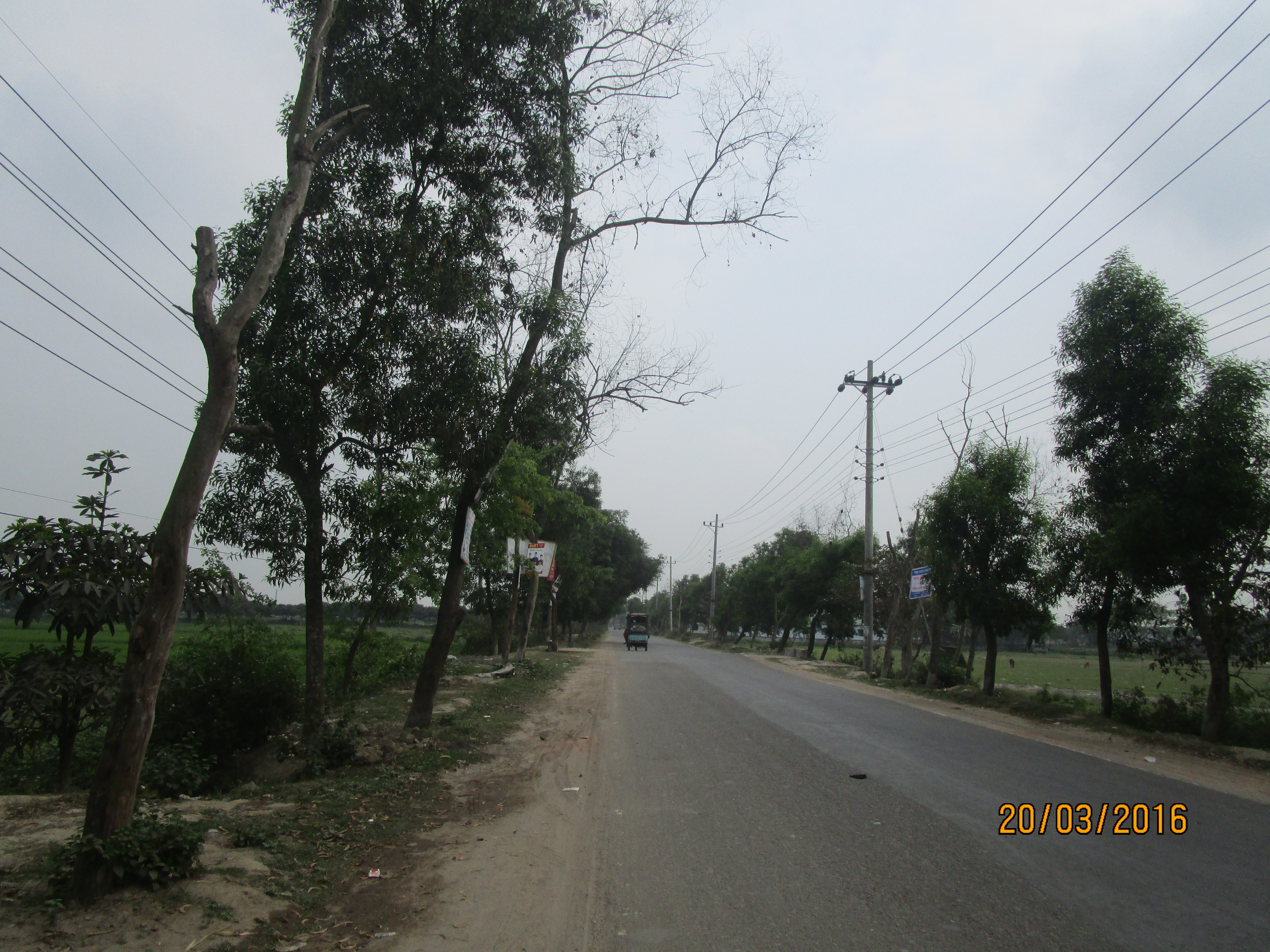

Route information
- Length: 22.5 km (14.0 mi)

Major junctions
- From: N401 in Khagdahar
- To: N3 in Mymensingh

Location
- Country: Bangladesh

Highway system
- Roads in Bangladesh
← N308	→ N310

N309 or Khagdahar-Mymensingh Bypass Highway is a highway in Bangladesh, which starts from the N401 Highway in the Khagdahar area of Mymensingh Sadar Upazila of Mymensingh district and adopts the name Bypass near the eastern edge of Mymensingh city and connects to the Dhaka-Mymensingh Highway next to Notre Dame College Mymensingh in the southern edge of the city.
