= Hatirjheel–Demra Expressway =

Highway in Bangladesh

R112
- Hatirjheel–Demra Expressway

Route information
- Maintained by Bangladesh Road Transport Authority
- Length: 10 km (6.2 mi)

Major junctions
- North end: Hatirjheel, Dhaka
- South end: Demra, Dhaka

Location
- Country: Bangladesh
- Major cities: Dhaka

Highway system
- Roads in Bangladesh
→ N1

The Hatirjheel–Demra Expressway is a 10 km (6.2 mi) regional highway located in the division of Dhaka, Bangladesh.

== History ==
The construction of this road stretching from Hatirjheel to Demra was started in 2003. The two-lane road took 12 years to complete at a cost of ৳106.54 crore.

== Expansion ==
Vehicles from Dhaka use the Jatrabari–Kanchpur highway to reach the southern city of Chittagong. To reduce the dependence on this one road, the government planned to convert Hatirjheel–Demra road into an expressway in 2015 through which N1 and N2 can be accessed. The government planned to convert the existing road into a four-lane highway. In 2018, the process of appointing contractors for the widening project of the highway began. But the project got stuck due to legal complications in hiring contractors. It was planned to be implemented in Public Private Partnership in 2020. The following year, the government awarded the project to China Communications Construction Company and China Road and Bridge Corporation. On 9 January 2022, The project was approved in the meeting of the Executive Committee of the National Economic Council. ৳3,303 crore has been allocated for converting the road into an expressway. The dateline of the project is fixed in 2026. As per the plan, the expressway will pass through the Rampura canal towards Banasree, but the Dhaka North City Corporation raised objections in 2023, saying that if the expressway's pillars were built along the Rampura Canal embankment, the canal's normal flow would be disrupted. However, the Road Transport and Highways Division said that the work will continue through discussions and coordination.

== Route ==
1. Rampura Bridge
2. C Block
3. Ideal
4. D Block
5. Farazi Hospital
6. Meradia
7. Banasree
8. Trimohoni
9. Amulia Bazar
10. Amulia Model Town
11. Mirpara
12. Staff Quarter
