= Dhaka–Narayanganj link road =

Highway in Bangladesh

R111
- Dhaka–Narayanganj Link Road

Route information
- Maintained by Bangladesh Road Transport Authority
- Length: 8.15 km (5.06 mi)

Major junctions
- North end: Signboard, Siddhirganj Thana
- South end: Chashara, Narayanganj Model Thana

Location
- Country: Bangladesh
- Major cities: Narayanganj

Highway system
- Roads in Bangladesh
← N1	→ R110

Dhaka–Narayanganj Link Road is a 8.15 km (5.06 mi) regional highway located in the district of Narayanganj, Dhaka Division, Bangladesh. It is one of three entryways from Dhaka to Narayanganj through the Dhaka–Chittagong Highway.

== Background ==
This regional highway was inaugurated in 1997. It starts from the Signboard, Narayanganj District and ends at Chashara, Narayanganj. This 8.15 km highway merges with the Dhaka–Chittagong Highway in the north. There are many government and private offices on both sides of this highway. One has to use this highway to reach Khan Shaheb Osman Ali Stadium. Regular illegal plying of many autorickshaws on this highway has increased traffic jams and accidents.

== Expansion ==
This highway is too narrow as compared to the requirement, resulting in traffic jams due to thirty times the capacity of vehicles plying on this highway. Apart from this, the importance of this highway is gradually increasing as a result of increasing population and commercialization in Narayanganj. So the government planned to increase the width of the highway. After the Ministry of Road Transport and Bridges proposed the implementation of this project, the project evaluation committee meeting held on 8 July 2019 made some recommendations about the project. By implementing them, the ministry prepared a restructured development project proposal to be sent to the meeting of the Executive Committee of the National Economic Council (ECNEC). As part of the project, bus bays were planned to be constructed at five points on the highway to ease traffic jams. On 28 January 2020, the project was passed in the ECNEC meeting. After sanctioning the project, ECNEC appointed a contracting group consisting of NDE, TBL, HTBL and JV on 9 February 2021 to execute the project. ৳449.58 crore was allocated for conversion of existing highway into 129 feet wide 6 lane highway which was supposed to be opened after 17 months. But at the end of the deadline, the project was fixed at home in June 2023. As of March 2023, 70% of the highway expansion project has been completed.

== Route ==
1. Signboard
2. Mamudpur
3. Kazibari
4. Bhuigor
5. Rupayan Town
6. Delpara
7. Jalkuri
8. Jubo Unnoyon Bibhag
9. Osman Ali stadium
10. Sibu market
11. District Jail
12. Zila Parishad
13. DC Office
14. Chanmari
15. Chashara
