= Narayanganj–Demra road =

Highway in Bangladesh

R110
- Narayanganj–Demra Road

Route information
- Maintained by Bangladesh Road Transport Authority
- Length: 19 km (12 mi)

Major junctions
- South end: Chashara, Narayanganj
- North end: Jatrabari Thana, Dhaka

Location
- Country: Bangladesh
- Major cities: Dhaka; Narayanganj

Highway system
- Roads in Bangladesh
← R810	→ N1

Narayanganj–Demra Road is a 19 km (12 mi) regional highway located in the division of Dhaka, Bangladesh. It is one of three entryways from Dhaka to Narayanganj. It is also called Narayanganj–Adamjee–Demra Road.

== Background ==
Before 1971, Narayanganj Municipality constructed this road. There are two bus services through this route namely Shitalakshya Paribahan and Duranto Service. Adamjee Export Processing Zone is located near this highway. Dhaka–Chittagong and Dhaka–Sylhet Highways can be accessed through this road. The road was closed in June 2020 to construct a box channel connecting the Shitalakshya River as part of the DND dam project. After the construction, Narayanganj–Demra road was opened for traffic in March 2021.

== Expansion ==
On 22 January 2019, the expansion project of Jatrabari–Demra section of the highway was passed in the meeting of the Executive Committee of the National Economic Council (ECNEC). Toma Construction was appointed as the contractor for the project in 2020. ৳332.12 crore has been allocated for the project.

== Route ==
1. Chashara
2. Missionpara
3. Metro hall
4. Hospital
5. Borofkol
6. Kellarpool
7. Nobiganj Godara Ghat
8. IET School
9. Haziganj Mazar
10. Pathantuli
11. Mazipara Pool
12. Chowdhury Bari
13. Tatkhana
14. Syedpara
15. Dui Nong
16. Burma Stand
17. Vandary Pool
18. SO bus stand
19. Adamjee Nagar
20. Kodomtoli Pool
21. Adamjee Komol minibus stand
22. Adamjee EPZ
23. Siddhirganj Pool
24. Chittagong Road
25. Ranimohol
26. Sarulia
27. Demra circle
28. Staff quarter
29. Deilla
30. Basher bridge
31. Konapara
32. Golden bridge
33. Konapara bridge
34. Matuail madrasa
35. Mridha bari
36. Banga Press
37. Kazla bridge
38. Jatrabari
