= Dhaka–Ashulia Elevated Expressway =

Third Elevated Expressway in Bangladesh

Dhaka-Ashulia Elevated Expressway
- ঢাকা আশুলিয়া উড়াল মহাসড়ক
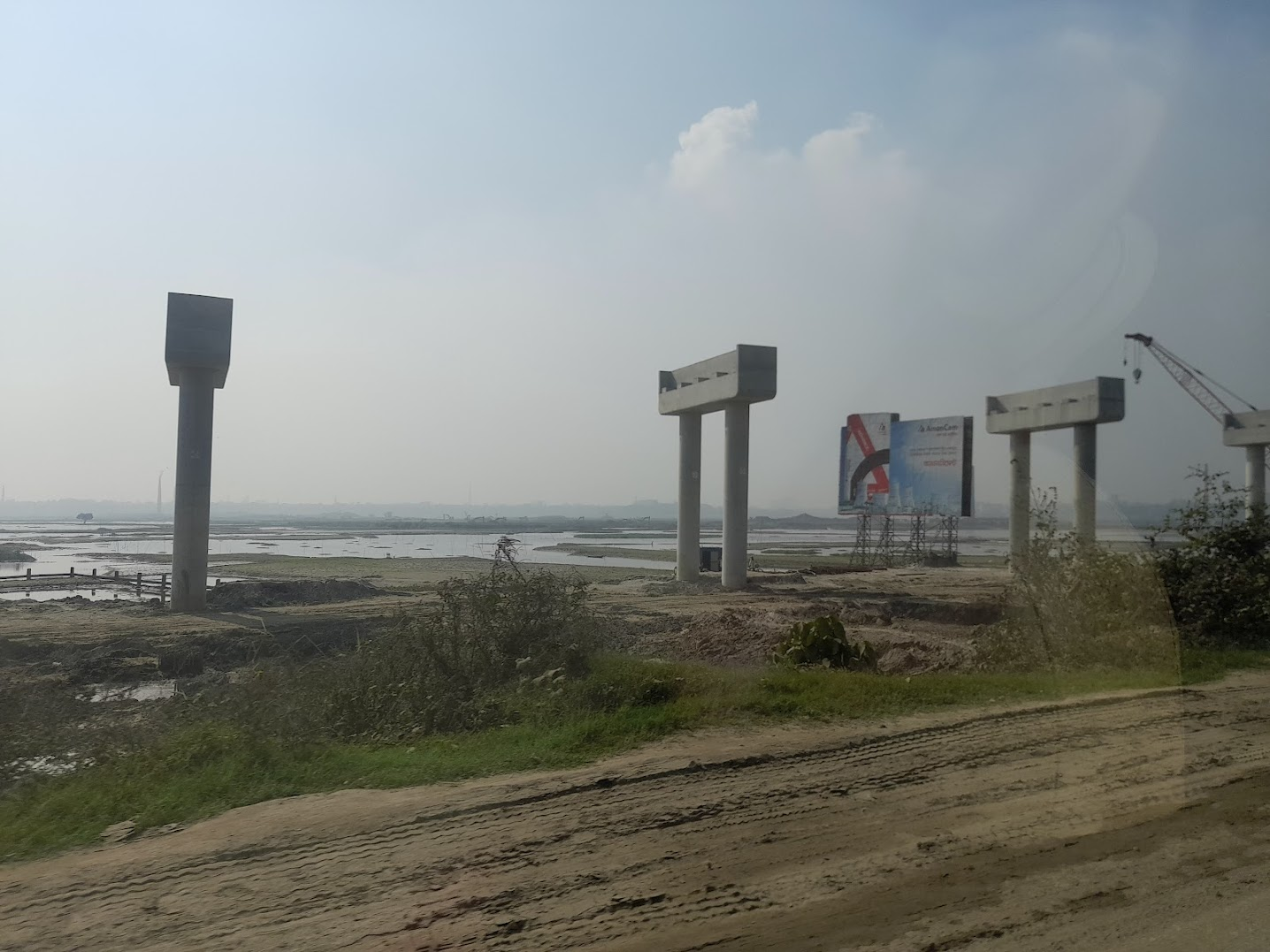
- Dhaka Elevated Expressway

Route information
- Length: 24 km (15 mi)
- Status: Under-construction

Major junctions
- Hazrat Shahjalal International Airport end: Dhaka Elevated Expressway
- Ashulia end: Baipayl

Location
- Country: Bangladesh

Highway system
- Roads in Bangladesh

Dhaka–Ashulia Elevated Expressway is an under-construction elevated expressway project in Bangladesh. Once built, the expressway will become Bangladesh’s third elevated expressway and connect Hazrat Shahjalal International Airport with Abdullahpur, Ashulia, Baipayl and Dhaka Export Processing Zone (DEPZ) on the Nabinagar–Chandra highway. Near the airport it will meet the Dhaka Elevated Expressway. The project is being implemented by Bangladesh Bridge Authority (BBA).

In March 2024, the authority announced plans to construct a trumpet interchange at Baipayl, where three major roads converge, aimed at enhancing traffic flow. However, the introduction of this interchange will necessitate design modifications, potentially resulting in a cost increase of ৳500 crore (US$41 million) for the overall project.

In April 2025, the project was reported to be 33% behind its revised completion target, raising concerns that the extended deadline of June 2026 might not be met.

By July of 2025, the Bridges Division had asked for approval for a further Tk 5.16 billion, pushing the project's cost beyond its already-revised outlay of Tk 175.53 billion.

== See also ==
- Dhaka Elevated Expressway
- List of roads in Bangladesh
