= Noapara, Bangladesh =

Noapara, Noāpāra, Naopāra, Nāopāra, Noyapāra, Naoāpāra, Nowapara, or Nawāpāra is the name of 33 places in Bangladesh:

- Nāopāra, also called Noapara, located at 23°16′N 89°48′E
- Naopāra, also called Noa Para, located at 24°21′N 90°59′E
- Naopāra, also called Noapara, located at 23°35′N 89°37′E
- Naopāra, also called Noapara, located in Khulna Province, at 22°31′43″N 88°58′41″E
- Noyapāra, also called Noapara, located at 24°11′N 91°22′E
- Noāpāra, located at 25°01′N 89°45′E
- Noāpāra, located at 24°52′N 88°30′E
- Noāpāra, located at 24°49′N 90°48′E
- Noāpāra, located at 24°02′N 90°35′E
- Noāpāra, located at 23°47′N 90°39′E
- Noāpāra, located at 23°43′N 90°31′E
- Noāpāra, located at 23°17′N 90°53′E
- Noāpāra, located at 23°12′N 91°00′E
- Noāpāra, also called Nowapara, located at 23°11′N 89°14′E
- Noāpāra, located at 23°10′N 90°59′E
- Noāpāra, located at 23°09′N 89°37′E
- Noāpāra, located at 23°07′N 90°54′E
- Noāpāra, located at 22°56′N 90°16′E
- Noāpāra, located at 22°38′N 90°07′E
- Noāpāra, located in Chittagong Province, at 22°26′30″N 91°55′22″E
- Noāpāra, located in Chittagong Province, at 21°03′55″N 92°13′28″E
- Noapara, located at 23°04′N 89°21′E
- Nawāpāra, also called Noapara, located at 23°50′N 89°05′E
- Nawāpāra, also called Noapara, located at 23°15′N 89°33′E
- Naoāpāra, also called Noapara, located at 24°21′N 90°30′E
- Naoāpāra, also called Noapara, located at 23°03′N 89°08′E
- Naoāpāra, also called Noapara, located at 22°45′N 89°39′E
- Noāpāra, located in Chittagong Province, at 21°46′15″N 91°58′34″E
- Noapara, located in Chittagong Province, at 22°17′07″N 92°11′33″E
- Noapāra, located in Chittagong Province, at 22°17′57″N 92°09′13″E
- Noāpāra, located in Chittagong Province, at 21°05′39″N 92°13′27″E
- Noāpāra, located in Chittagong Province, at 21°43′40″N 91°53′01″E
- Noāpāra, located in Chittagong Province, at 22°37′03″N 91°59′09″E
