= Demra Thana =

Thana in Dhaka South City Corporation, Bangladesh

Demra Thana ডেমরা থানা
- Thana
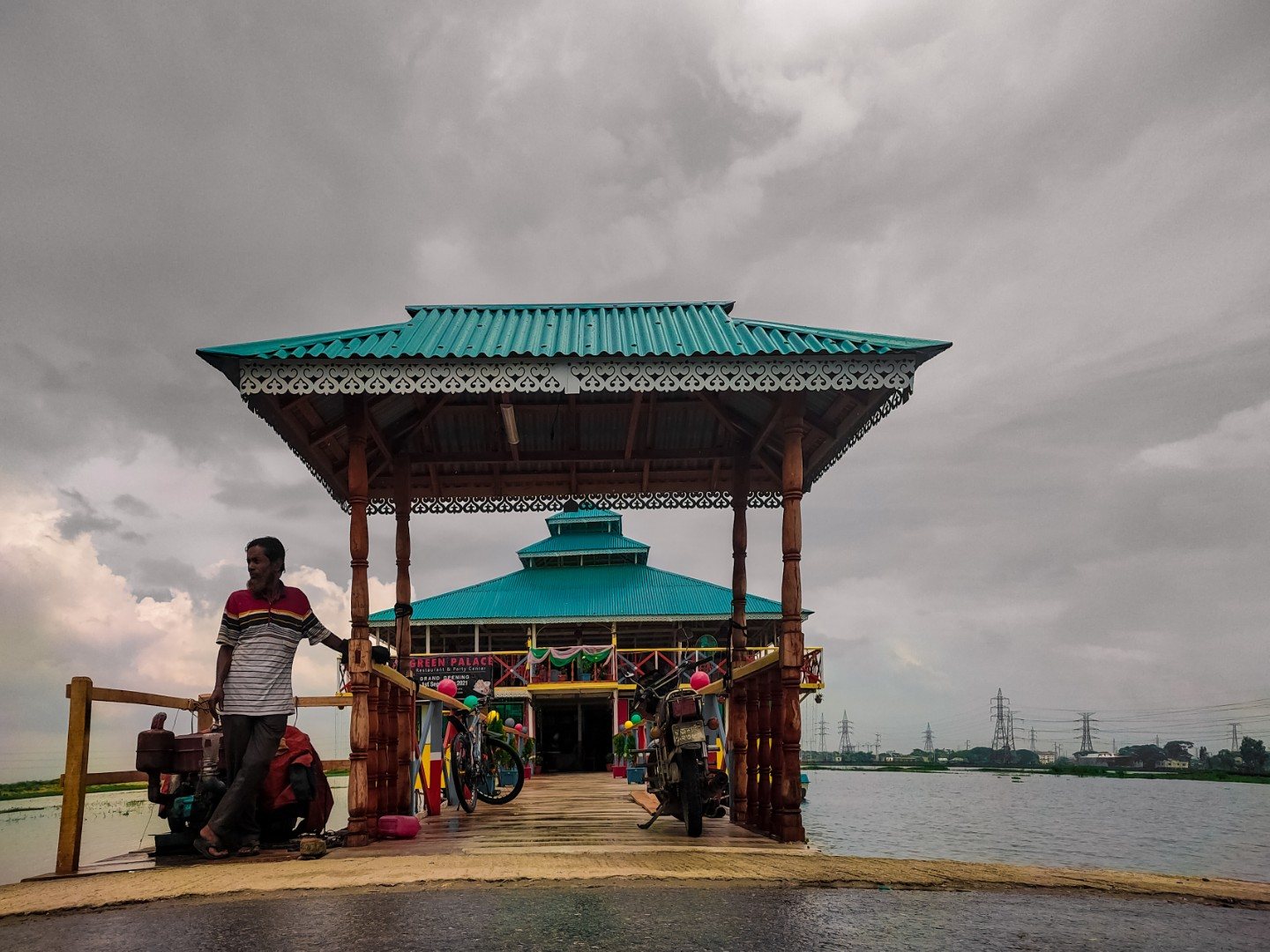
- A floating restaurant in Dharmik Para, Demra
- Interactive map of Demra Thana
- Location of Demra Thana within Dhaka Location of Demra Thana within Dhaka Division Location of Demra Thana within Bangladesh
- Coordinates: 23°43.6′N 90°29.7′E
- Country: Bangladesh
- Division: Dhaka Division
- District: Dhaka District

Area
  - Total: 22.4 km^{2} (8.6 sq mi)
- Elevation: 23 m (75 ft)

Population (2022)
  - Total: 278,830
  - Density: 11,709/km^{2} (30,330/sq mi)
- Time zone: UTC+6 (BST)
- Postal code: 1360
- Area code: 02
- Website: bangladesh.gov.bd/maps/images/dhaka/DemraT.gif

Demra (Bengali: ডেমরা) is a (metropolitan) thana of Dhaka city, the capital of Bangladesh. It consists of Ward No 64, 65 (part), 66, 67, 68, 69 and 70 of Dhaka South City Corporation. Demra is situated in the eastern border area of Dhaka City.

== History ==
Demra Thana was established in 1973. The thana consists of 6 wards & 19 mouzas.

== Geography ==
Demra Thana is located at 23.7083°N 90.4417°E. It has 102757 units of household and total area 22.4 km^{2} [2011].

It is bounded by Khilgaon and Sabujbagh thanas on the north, Sampur thana and Narayanganj sadar upazila on the south, Rupganj upazila on the east, Kadamtali and Jatrabari thanas on the west.

== Demographics ==
Religions in Demra Thana (2022)
Religion	Percent
Islam	97.40%
Hinduism	2.56%
Other or not stated	0.04%

According to the 2022 Bangladeshi census, Demra Thana had 69,569 households and a population of 278,836. 8.55% of the population were under 5 years of age. Demra had a literacy rate (age 7 and over) of 85.77%: 87.39% for males and 83.98% for females, and a sex ratio of 110.60 males for every 100 females.

According to the 2011 Census of Bangladesh, Demra Thana had 51,645 households with average household size of 4.23 and a population of 226,679. Males constituted 53.73% (121,805) of the population while females 46.27% (104,874). Demra Thana had a literacy rate (age 7 and over) of 73.1%, compared to the national average of 51.8%, and a sex ratio of 116.There were 21 floating people in this jurisdiction.

The religious breakdown was Muslim 97.39% (220,753), Hindu 2.58% (5,838), Christian 0.02% (41), Buddhist 0.01% (34), and others 0.01% (13). The ethnic minority people living there were 87 persons in total.

== Parliament's constituency ==
Demra is a part of Dhaka-5 parliamentary constituency. It is one of the 300 constituencies of the National Assembly of Bangladesh. It is the 178th seat of the Jatiya Sangsad in the Dhaka district.

The constituency was created for the first general elections in newly independent Bangladesh, held in 1973.

Ahead of the 2008 general election, the Election Commission redrew constituency boundaries to reflect population changes revealed by the 2001 Bangladesh census. 2008 redistricting altered the boundaries of the constituency.

== Notable people ==
- Habibur Rahman Mollah (26 January 1942 - 6 May 2020), politician, businessman, MP

== See also ==
- Upazilas of Bangladesh
- Districts of Bangladesh
- Divisions of Bangladesh
- Thanas of Bangladesh
- Administrative geography of Bangladesh
