= Transport in Dhaka =

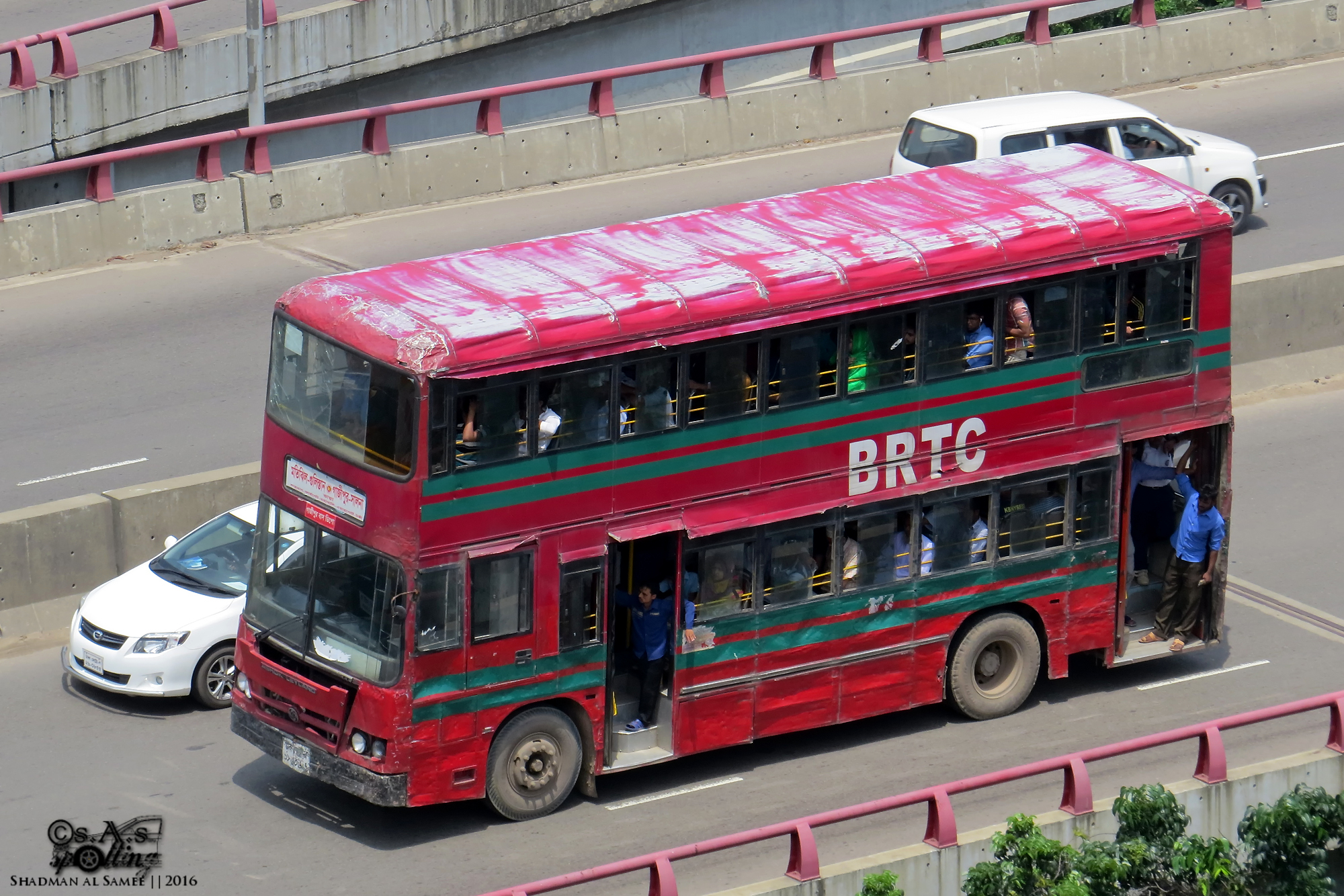
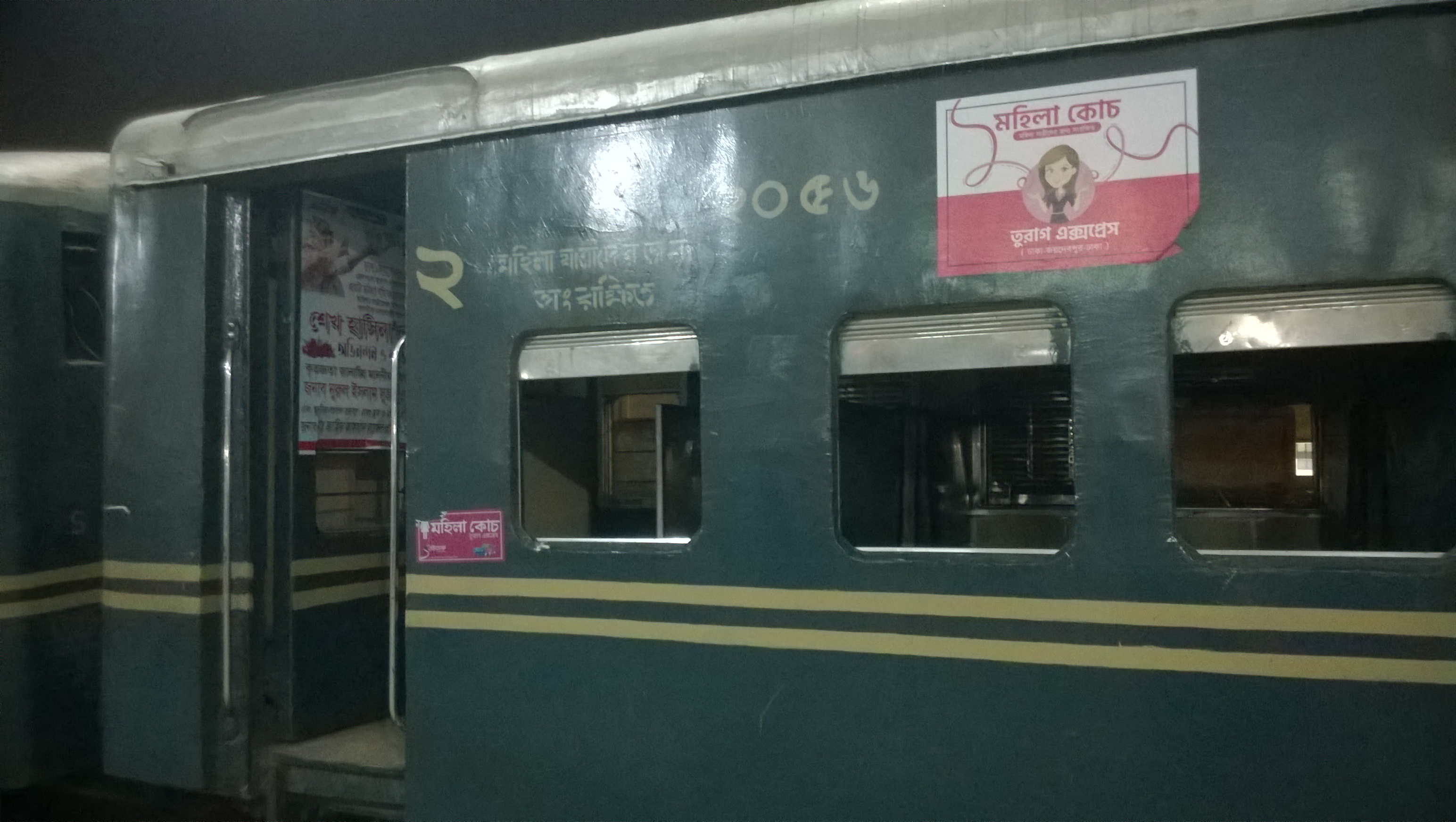
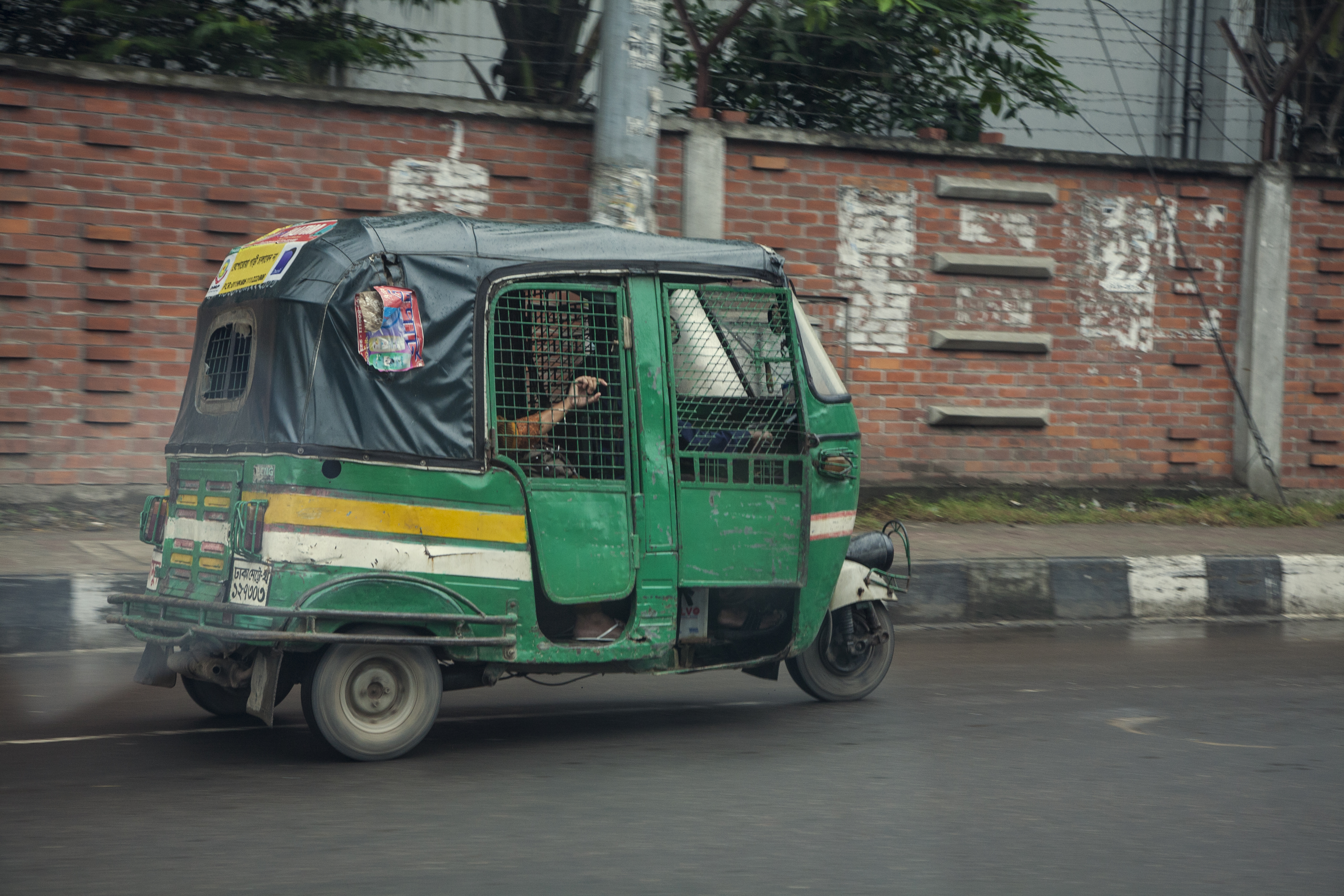
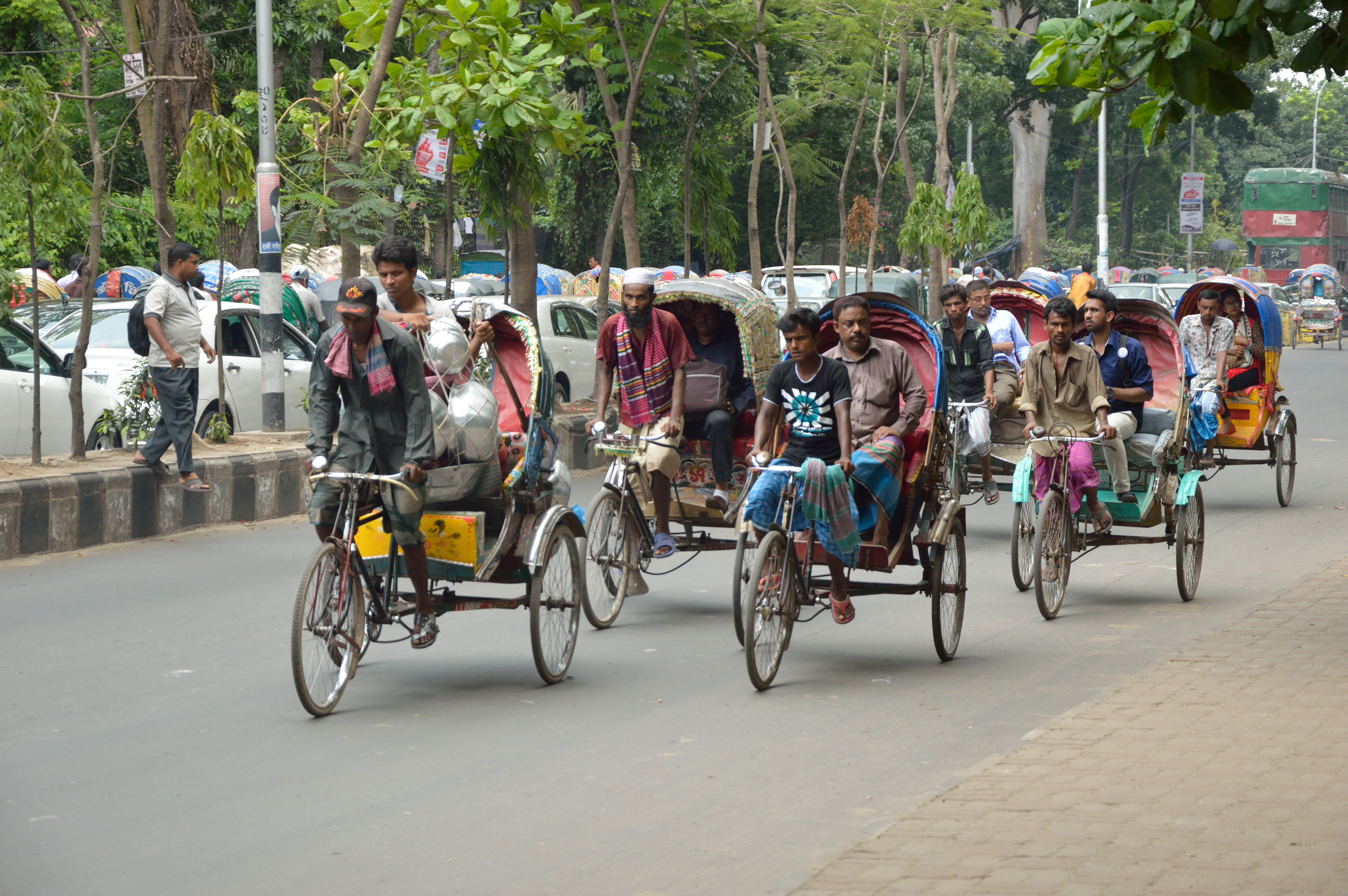
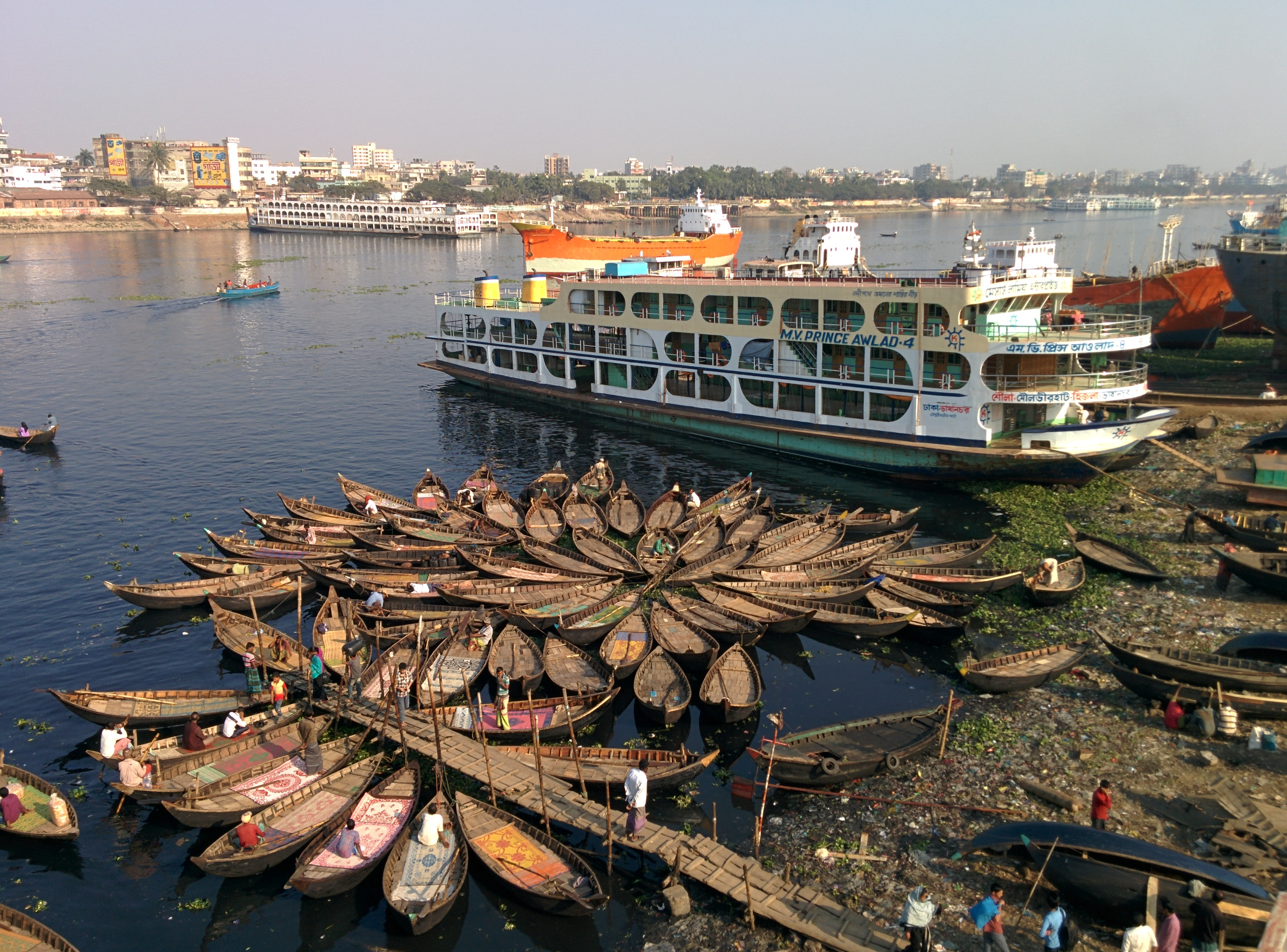
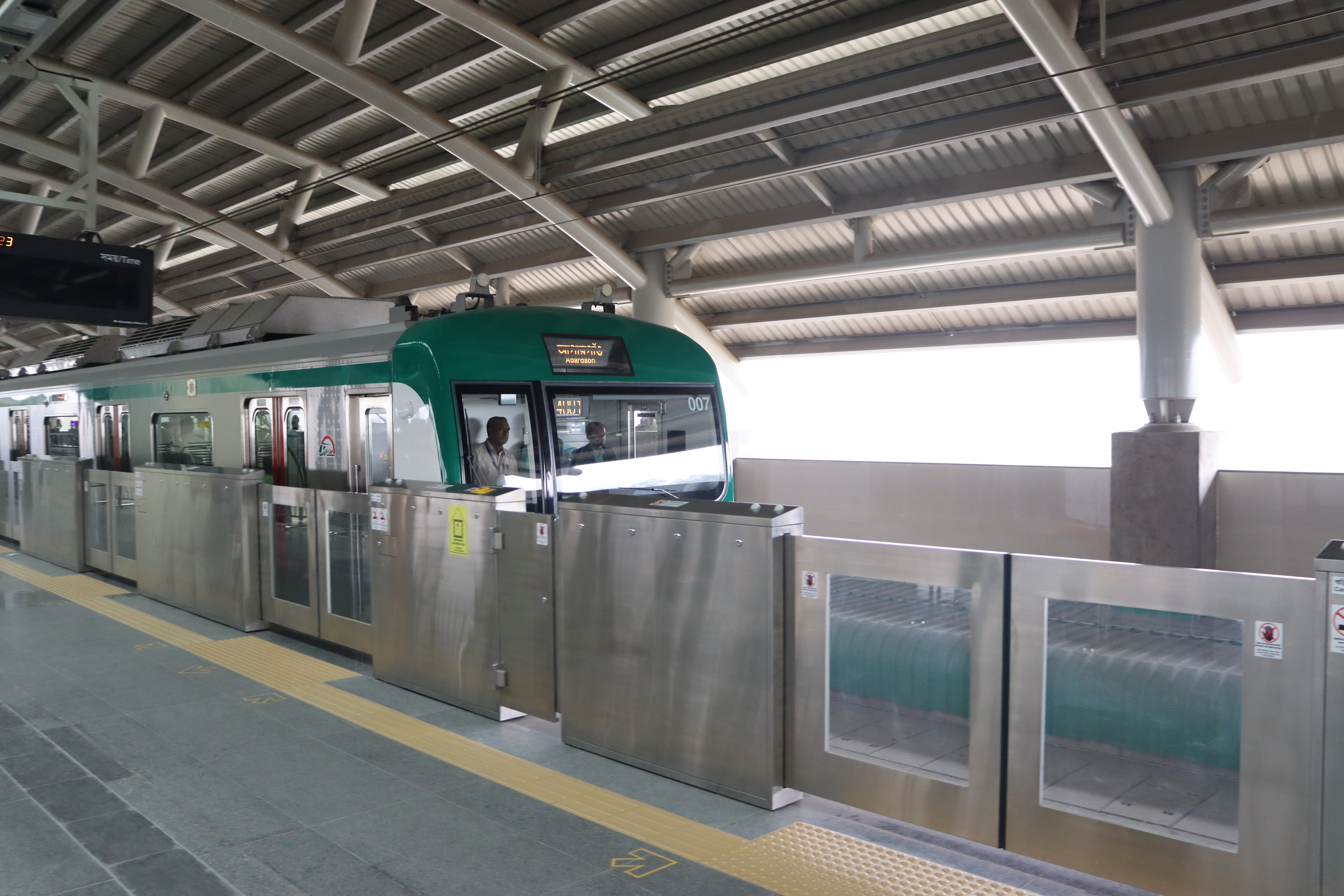
- Double decker bus of Bangladesh Road Transport Corporation Turag Commuter train of Bangladesh Railway CNG based auto rickshaws Cycle rickshaws Ferry across Buriganga River Metro rake of MRT Line 6

Overview
- Area served: Greater Dhaka
- Locale: Dhaka Metropolitan Area
- Transit type: Rapid transit, commuter rail, bus, taxicab and ferry

Operation
- Operator: Dhaka Transport Coordination Authority

Transport in Dhaka consists of a mixture of cars, buses, rickshaws, motorcycles, and pedestrians, all vying for space in an environment where congestion is a daily challenge. The average traffic speed is 4.8 kilometres per hour (3.0 mph), the slowest in the world, and congestion was estimated to cost the economy US$6.5 billion in 2020.

Dubbed "the rickshaw capital of the world," cycle rickshaws are the most popular and ubiquitous mode of transport in Dhaka, preferred for their affordability and ability to navigate narrow streets. The bus system in the city is disorganised, with hundreds of different companies serving various parts of the city using buses often characterised as unfit and uncomfortable. Motorcycles are rapidly gaining popularity as a personal transport mode, partly due to online ride-sharing services. Despite this, car ownership remains among the lowest in Asian cities.

Efforts to address these transportation issues have been ongoing, with various initiatives aiming to improve the efficiency and sustainability of Dhaka's transport network. Major projects, such as the construction of metro rail systems, flyovers, and dedicated bus lanes, are underway to alleviate the traffic burden and provide more reliable public transit options.

== History ==
Palki, existing since the pre-modern era, were the popular mode of transportation for women and the rich in Dhaka until about 150 years ago. These box-like structures, carried by four to eight people, were frequently used for formal events like weddings and even to transport patients. Initially limited to the wealthy, palanquins gradually spread among common people.

In 1856, influential Armenian businessman G M Shircore introduced the tikka gari or hackney-carriage to Dhaka, better known locally as ghorar gari or tomtom. These vehicles, imported from Kolkata, sparked a transport revolution, prompting other businessmen to follow suit. By 1867, there were 60 horse carriages in Dhaka, which increased to 300 by 1874 and stood at 600 in 1889.

In 1885, the first rail line was constructed between Dhaka and Narayanganj, extending to Mymensingh the following year. The rail line was laid almost parallel to the Mughal-era road, running from Tongi through Tejgaon, Kawran Bazar to the Shahbag area. It formed a loop around Ramna, then turned east, cutting through the Nimtali-Fulbaria area before heading south towards Fatullah and Narayanganj. The Fulbaria area was developed into a railway complex, including the Dhaka (Fulbaria) railway station. Starting in 1958, the government redirected part of the railway line from Tejgaon to Khilgaon and then to Kamalapur, removing the previous east–west barrier that cut through the middle of the growing city, impeding traffic flow. The new railway station at Kamalapur was inaugurated on 27 April 1968. The old railway track was paved over, and the former station area was transformed into a bus terminus.

Dhaka's elite owned vintage cars with canvas roofs in the early 1920s. Mawla Bakhsh, a mechanic formerly employed by a British-owned workshop, opened his own business, India Motor Works. He had two cars, which he deployed as taxis between Dhaka and Narayanganj and rented out for transporting patients and other purposes.

After World War II, Bakhsh purchased several trucks auctioned off by the Allied forces and retrofitted them for passenger transport. These buses, known as murir tin due to their wooden bodies wrapped in tin, ran on petrol and built from Ford chassis and Chevrolet engines. They operated from Bahadur Shah Park to Narayanganj, carrying 20–22 seated passengers on plank benches along the sides, with 40–50 standing in the middle. These buses were started with a crank and had a rubber bulb horn. A piece of wood near the driver was used to signal turns. Self-starters and electric horns were later added to these buses. In 1948, these buses ran from Fulbaria to Chowk Bazaar and by the end of the 20th century, they ran from Rampura to Sadarghat, when they declined.

Double-decker buses were introduced at the end of the 1960s, imported from the UK and later from India and Europe. In 2013, articulated buses were introduced for the first time.

In 1938, European jute exporters living in Narayanganj and Netrokona (in Mymensingh) imported the first cycle rickshaws from Kolkata for personal use. Initially, these rickshaws did not attract much attention from residents accustomed to horse carriages, palanquins, and city-canal boats. In 1941, Dhaka had only 37 rickshaws, increasing to 181 by 1947. However, by 1998, the number of registered rickshaws in the city had surged to 112,572, some of which were later retrofitted with electric motors.

Auto-rickshaws, or "baby taxis," became popular among the middle class during the Pakistan period. These two-stroke yellow and black vehicles were replaced by green CNG-run auto-rickshaws in 2002 due to pollution concerns. Around 1978, tempos emerged. Initially called a helicopter, this vehicle was a baby taxi converted to carry 8–12 passengers and ran along fixed routes. By 1988, there were at least 60 tempo routes in Dhaka.

Aviation in Dhaka began during World War II with military airstrips at Tejgaon and Kurmitola (Balurghat). Post-war, Tejgaon Airport was repurposed for civil use, when the privately owned Orient Airways operated DC-3 (Dakota) and DHC-6 (Twin Otter) aircraft there until it was succeeded by Pakistan International Airlines in 1948. Biman Bangladesh Airlines, the national carrier, was founded on 4 January 1972, using Fokker F-27 (Friendship) and ATP planes. Tejgaon Airport was upgraded and remained in operation until it was handed over to the Bangladesh Air Force in 1981, following the opening of the new Dhaka International Airport (now Hazrat Shahjalal International Airport). A modern terminal building, scheduled to begin operations in October 2024, will upgrade the current airport passenger capacity from 8 million to 20 million.

== Public transportation ==
=== Buses ===
Public buses in Dhaka are primarily operated by numerous private companies, with a minority run by the state-owned Bangladesh Road Transport Corporation (BRTC). In 2007, buses in Dhaka carried approximately 1.9 million passengers per day. According to a 2020 analysis by Azizur Rahman Anik, more than 10 million people use local buses daily in the Dhaka Metropolitan Area. These buses operated on over 300 routes, with many routes overlapping. Data from the Bangladesh Road Transport Authority (BRTA) in 2023 indicated that 3,794 buses owned by 75 companies have route permits, although 871 lack fitness clearances. However, the Dhaka Road Transport Owners' Association claims 120 operators run over 5,000 buses, many without authorisation. Additionally, a minority of BRTC's operational 1,268-bus fleet (as of February 2024) is in active service, with the remainder rented to various institutions.

BRTC drivers receive salaries and benefits similar to other government employees. In contrast, most private bus drivers work on a contractual basis. Private bus owners get a fixed amount for a set number of trips, while drivers and conductors retain earnings from additional trips, leading to competition for passengers. A significant portion of the public transportation fleet in Dhaka operates without the required fitness certifications, many characterised by unhygienic and uncomfortable interiors, featuring broken windows, damaged seats, compromised bus bodies, and malfunctioning brake and indicator lights.

The BRTC's fleet is primarily composed of Ashok Leyland double-deckers, the last Volvo double-decker having been scrapped in 2022. The agency also operates single-deckers from Ashok Leyland and Tata Motors of India. As of 2021, BRTC also had a fleet of 35 Ashok Leyland articulated buses, which are hardly put to use. Previously, the single-decker fleet included buses from FAW (China) and Daewoo (South Korea). The BRTC has been criticised for its buses going out of order too quickly.

Government efforts to address issues with public buses in the city, such as introducing a minimum wage for drivers, consolidating bus routes with the Dhaka Nagar Paribahan franchise, and implementing electronic ticketing systems in the early 2020s, have been unsuccessful. A 20-kilometre (12 mi) bus rapid transit system, the Dhaka BRT, is in construction (as of January 2025) since 2017, projected to end by December 2025.

==== Intercity and international services ====
Private transportation companies dominate intercity and inter-district routes, with allegations that these entities have reportedly impeded the BRTC's efforts to expand its limited number of inter-district routes. Highway links to the Indian cities of Kolkata, Agartala, Guwahati and Shillong have been established by the BRTC and private bus companies, which also run regular international bus services to those cities from Dhaka.

=== Trains ===
==== Rapid transit systems ====
Dhaka Metro Rail, managed by the Dhaka Mass Transit Company Limited, is the city's first mass rapid transit system, operational since late 2022. The initial route, MRT Line 6, partially commenced service on 28 December 2022, with an average daily ridership of 250,000 passengers. Two additional routes, MRT Line 1 and MRT Line 5, are projected to open by 2030 of the five total planned.

The Bangladesh Bridge Authority has proposed the development of a separate subway system in Dhaka, the Dhaka Subway, which has seen no progress as of March 2024.

==== Commuter rail ====
The state-owned Bangladesh Railway (BR) operates several commuter services from Dhaka, connecting nearby locations such as Narayanganj, Bhanga, Gazipur, and Tangail from Kamalapur railway station, the largest and busiest of the city's railway stations. Previously, suburban services to Narayanganj and Gazipur cities used diesel-electric multiple-unit (DEMU) trains imported from China. However, by 2023, all of them have been found abandoned due to lack of maintenance. Neglect towards commuter services has led the BR to run a reduced number of train services with minimal available coaches. These trains offer minimal seating arrangements and lack basic amenities such as air conditioning, luggage space, and comfortable seating. There are proposals to build a suburban circular railway around the capital.

==== Intercity and international rail ====
The state-owned Bangladesh Railway provides suburban and national services, with regular express train services connecting Dhaka with other major urban areas, such as Chittagong, Rajshahi, Khulna, Sylhet and Rangpur. The Maitree Express and the Mitali Express provides connections from Dhaka to the West Bengal cities of Kolkata and Jalpaiguri respectively. A passenger train service is also expected to run from Kolkata to the Tripura capital Agartala via Dhaka through the Akhaura–Agartala line opened in November 2023.

=== Ferries ===
Water taxi services have been operating in Hatirjheel and Gulshan lakes since December 2016, providing easy access to Karwan Bazar, Moghbazar, Dilu Road, Eskaton, Bangla Motor, and Tejgaon for residents of Badda, Gulshan, Rampura, Khilgaon, and other eastern parts of the city. The service has jetties at five locations: Gulshan (Gudaraghat), Police Plaza, Badda, Rampura, and Karwan Bazar (BFDC). The 30 to 45-seater taxis cost ৳8.5 million (US$69,000) each, with engines imported from China at and assembled in Chittagong, are operated by a private company on a 20-year lease.

In September 2022, the Bangladesh Inland Water Transport Corporation (BIWTC) introduced a privately operated speedboat service on two routes from Tongi, with three boats to Kadda and two to Ulukhola, operated by a private company. Water buses were first introduced in Dhaka in 2004 between Sadarghat and Gabtoli, and later in 2010, 2013, and 2014, but all these services failed due to a shortage of passengers.

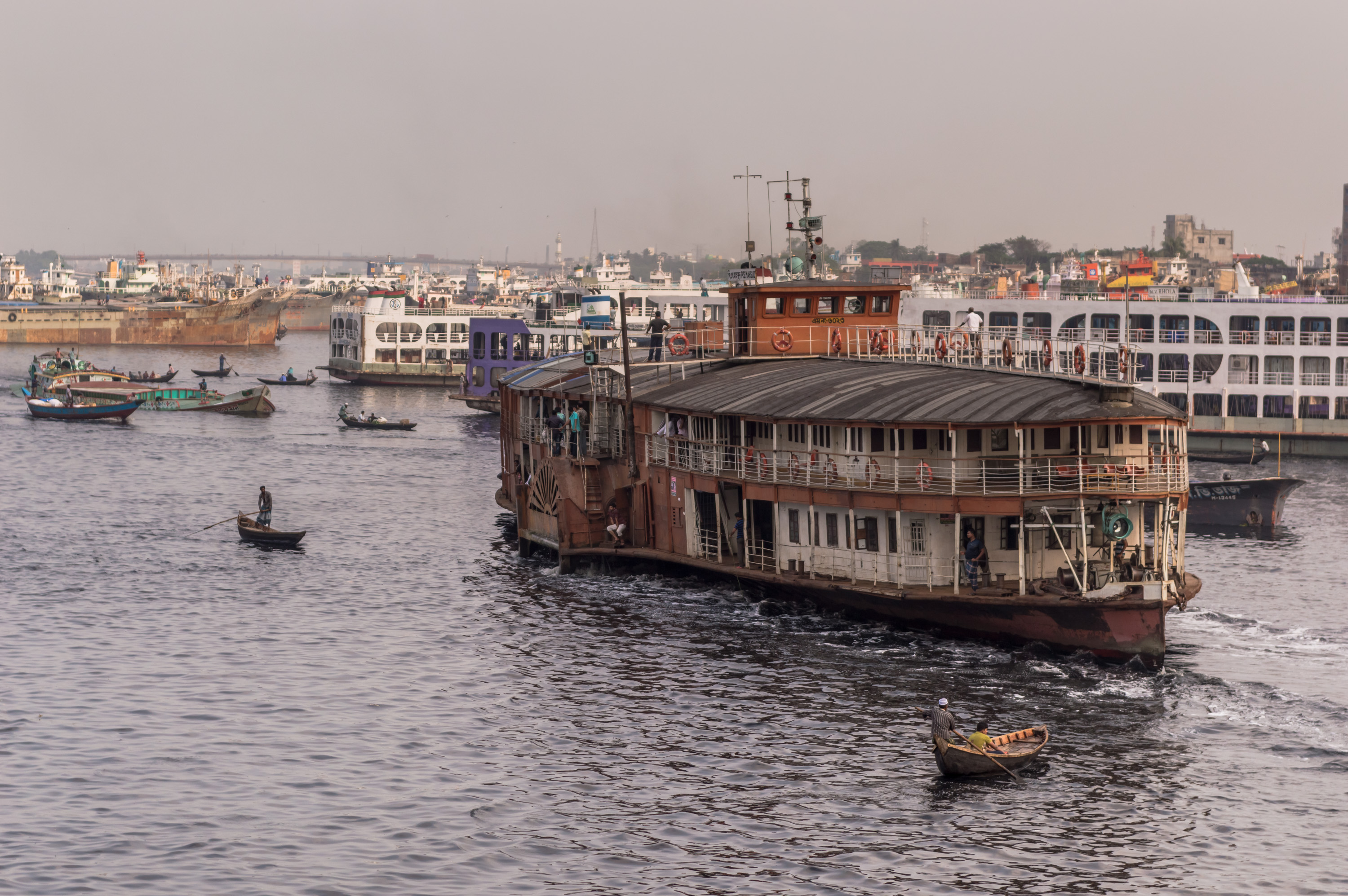
Boats and launches on the river Buriganga.

The Sadarghat port on the banks of the Buriganga River has served as the central hub for transporting goods and passengers upriver and to other ports in southern Bangladesh since the 19th century. In 1967, the BIWTA constructed a modern naval terminal at Sadarghat, serving as the landing station for passenger ferries, locally called launch. However, with the inauguration of the Padma Bridge in 2022, which significantly reduced travel time to the capital from south-western districts by road, travel by launch has declined.

=== Other transit ===
Numerous human haulers, locally known as leguna, ply the streets, mostly without route permits. These 10/12-seater, four-wheeled modified utility vehicles, introduced in the 2000s, have faced criticism for using underage drivers, overcrowding, pollution, and frequent accidents. According to BRTA data from 2018, 5,156 registered legunas operate in the capital on 159 routes. Unsuccessful efforts have been made to ban these mainly compressed natural gas-run vehicles, which do not have a set fare and allegedly face high extortion by the traffic police. According to the BRTA in 2022, route permits for these vehicles are no longer issued.

=== Transit hubs ===
Railway stations in Dhaka include:

- Kamalapur, which is the largest and busiest in the country, planned to be transformed into a multi-modal transport hub by 2030;
- Dhaka Airport, which is the second busiest in Dhaka, serving intercity, local and commuter trains;
- Dhaka Cantonment, which is used for immigration purposes, served by two international trains to India, the Maitree Express and the Mitali Express;
- Gandaria, which serves Narayanganj and the Dhaka–Jessore line via Padma Bridge, being rebuilt as of July 2023;
- Tejgaon, which is primarily used by local and commuter trains and for transporting goods, not used by intercity trains;
- Banani, which is seldom served by only one local train, has no platforms, and is primarily used for selling tickets.

There are several bus terminals for inter-district services, located at Sayedabad, Mohakhali, and Gabtoli, serving the southern, northern, and western regions of the country respectively. Additionally, there are bus terminals located at Fulbaria and Babubazar. Plans are underway to relocate these terminals outside the city.

== Roads and highways ==
Dhaka suffers some of the worst traffic congestion in the world, estimated to cost the economy US$6.5 billion in 2020. On average, people spend 2.4 hours a day stuck in traffic. In 2023, the average speed of a car travelling in the city was found to be less than 4.8 kilometres per hour (3.0 mph), down from 21 kilometres per hour (13 mph) a decade ago. Traffic in Dhaka wasted 3.2 million working hours each day, contributing to additional economic losses through wasted working hours, fuel consumption, and health impacts.

Dhaka suffers from the absence of a deliberate, integrated road network, characterised by narrow and discontinuous roads, staggered junctions, and a lack of accessibility for emergency vehicles. Additionally, there is no system of feeder streets leading to arterials and highways. Only seven per cent of the city is covered by roads, compared to around 25 per cent in Paris and Vienna and 40 per cent in Washington and Chicago. The city has 650 major intersections, with traffic management largely manual, often employing ropes, cones, and roadblock by the traffic police. In the World Traffic Index 2020, Dhaka ranked 10th for poor traffic management among 228 cities. Despite efforts to improve and introduce automatic signals, these initiatives have failed and are largely ignored by road users.

Several projects under construction or in planning aim to allow addressing the road network's lack of bypass and ring roads, including the Dhaka–Ashulia Elevated Expressway, the Dhaka Bypass Expressway, Panchabati–Muktarpur highway, Rayerbazar–Kamrangirchar inner ring road, Postagola–Chashara and Gabtoli–Dhour ring roads, and elevated roads connecting the north to the south and east to west of the city.

=== Bridges and flyovers ===
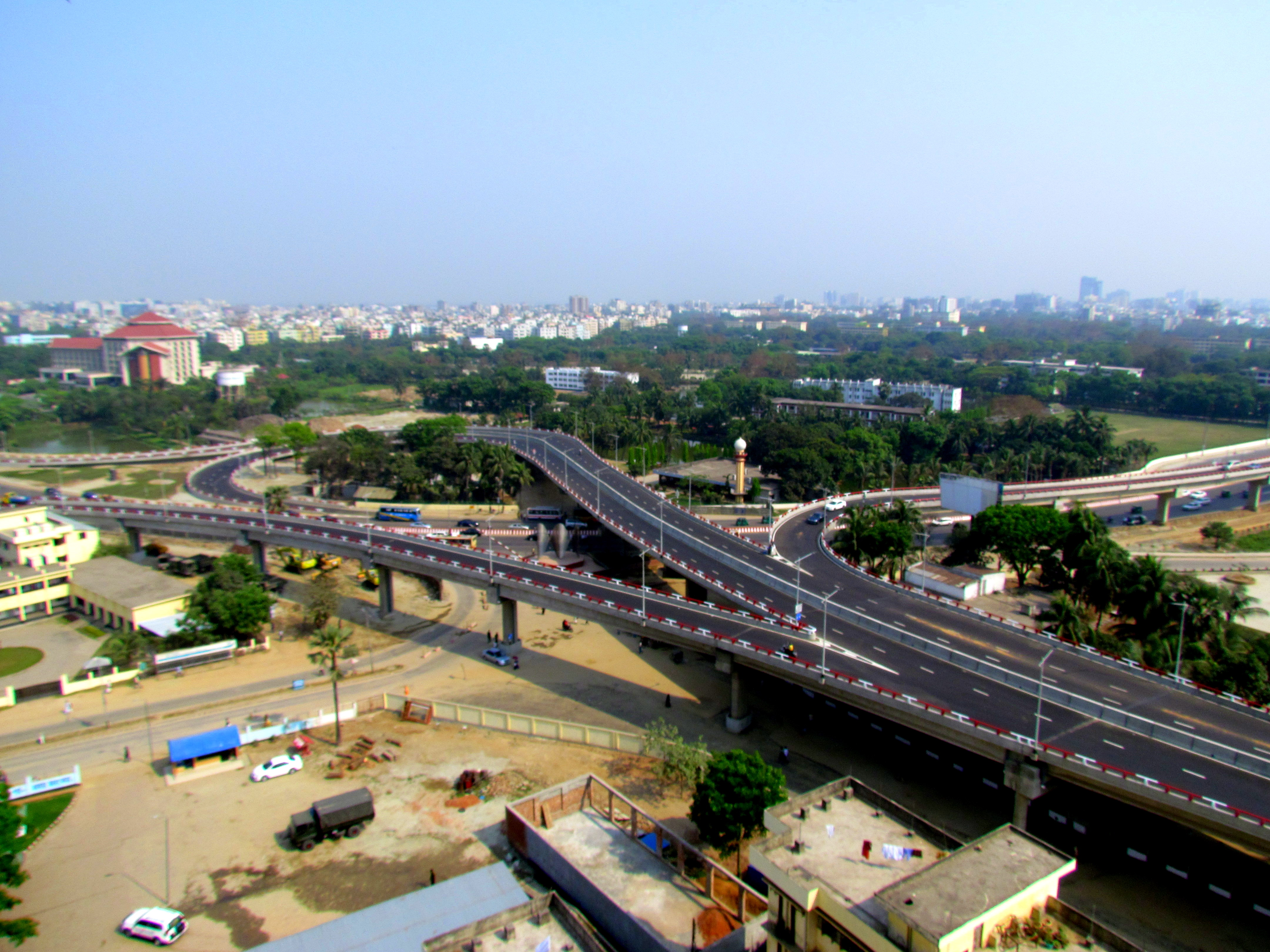
Zillur Rahman Flyover (Mirpur–Banani flyover)

On the periphery of the city, there are three bridges over the Buriganga River, which is of great economic importance to Dhaka: the Postogola Bridge, the Babubazar Bridge, and the Basila Bridge. These bridges connect the main part of the capital with the growing townships in the south. There are plans to build more bridges over this river to further enhance connectivity as traffic pressure mounts on the existing bridges.

On the west, the Aminbazar Bridge serves as the entry point to the city over the Turag River along the N5 (known as Dhaka–Aricha highway). The Tongi Bridge is a crucial link in the north for vehicles using the N3 (Dhaka–Mymensingh highway). In the south-east, the Kanchpur and Sultana Kamal bridges on the Shitalakshya River facilitate entry for vehicles using the N1 and N2 highways. Meanwhile, in the north-east, the Kanchan Bridge allows vehicles to enter the city through Purbachal township and provides access for those using the Dhaka Bypass Expressway.

As of 2023, eight flyovers (elevated roads) have been built in the city to mitigate traffic congestion, covering a total of 30 kilometres. The Mohakhali Flyover, opened in 2004, is the first in the country. The Mayor Hanif Flyover is the longest, connecting Gulistan and Jatrabari. Other notable flyovers include the Moghbazar–Mouchak Flyover, the second longest, Zillur Rahman Flyover, Kuril Flyover, Khilgaon Flyover, Bijoy Sarani–Tejgaon Link Road Flyover, and the Kalshi Flyover, the newest, which opened in February 2023.

=== Highways ===
Purbachal Expressway

The north–south Dhaka Elevated Expressway, connecting Dhaka airport with the N1 (Dhaka–Chittagong highway), is the country's first elevated expressway. It partially opened in 2023. A second elevated expressway, the Dhaka–Ashulia Elevated Expressway, is expected to be opened in 2026. The eight to 12-lane Purbachal Expressway, the first of its kind, provides access to the growing north-eastern satellite city of Purbachal.

The city is well connected to other parts of the country through highway links. Five of Bangladesh's eight major national highways start from the city: N1, N2, N3, N5 and N8. Dhaka is also directly connected to the two longest routes of the Asian Highway Network: AH1 and AH2, as well as to the AH41 route.

== Private transport ==
=== Motorcycles ===
Motorcycles comprised half of Dhaka's registered vehicles in 2023, with their numbers increasing by over 10 per cent annually. According to the BRTA, there were 1,068,866 registered motorcycles in the city, which also registers scooters under the same category. The number of motorcycles in Dhaka has rapidly risen since 2017, particularly with the introduction of ride-sharing apps. This increase has been criticised for contributing to the growing number of accidents in the city. In May 2024, a regulation was introduced to limit motorcycle speeds in cities to 30 kilometres per hour (19 mph), which have been banned on the Dhaka Elevated Expressway.

=== Cars ===
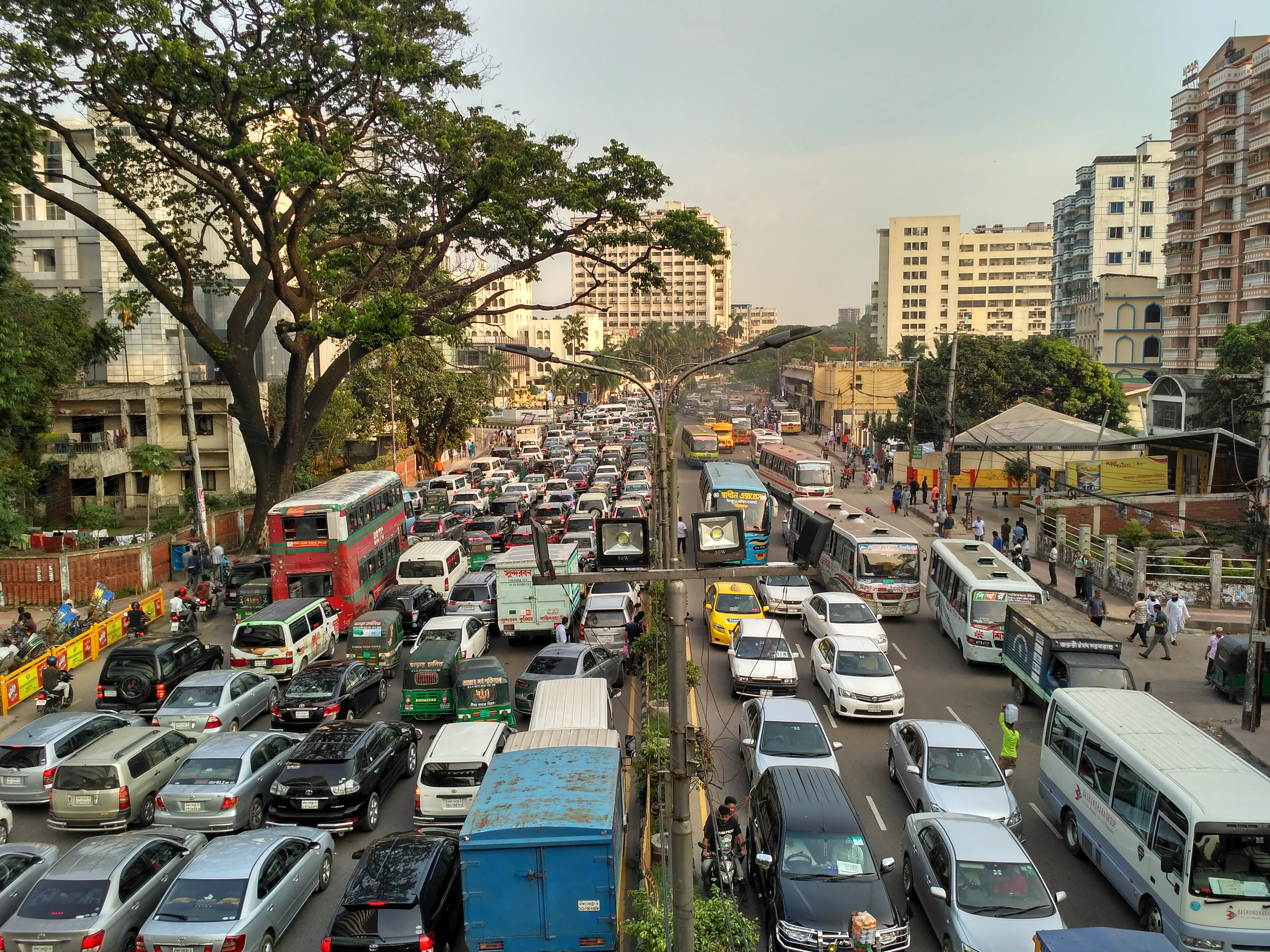
Congested street in Dhaka

Only six per cent of Dhaka residents own private cars, yet these vehicles occupy 76 per cent of the city's roads, with a low occupancy rate of 1.42. The number of registered private passenger cars in Dhaka was 163,004 in 2010, rising to 296,593 by June 2020. In 2004, there were 21,471 newly registered vehicles in Dhaka, a number that more than quadrupled to 95,743 by 2015. In the early 1990s, Dhaka had one of the lowest rates of car ownership among Asian cities. There are 80 petrol pumps in Dhaka as of 2024, with their numbers decreasing over the years.

In 2023, a guideline for the registration and operation of electric vehicles was approved. That year, 34 electric vehicles were registered, and the first commercial charging station was opened.

== Hired transport ==
The most popular and ubiquitous mode of transport in the city is the three-wheeled, non-motorized rickshaw, which accounted for 54 per cent of vehicle trips in 2011. Auto-rickshaws running on compressed natural gas (CNG) are another popular mode of transport.

=== Rickshaws ===
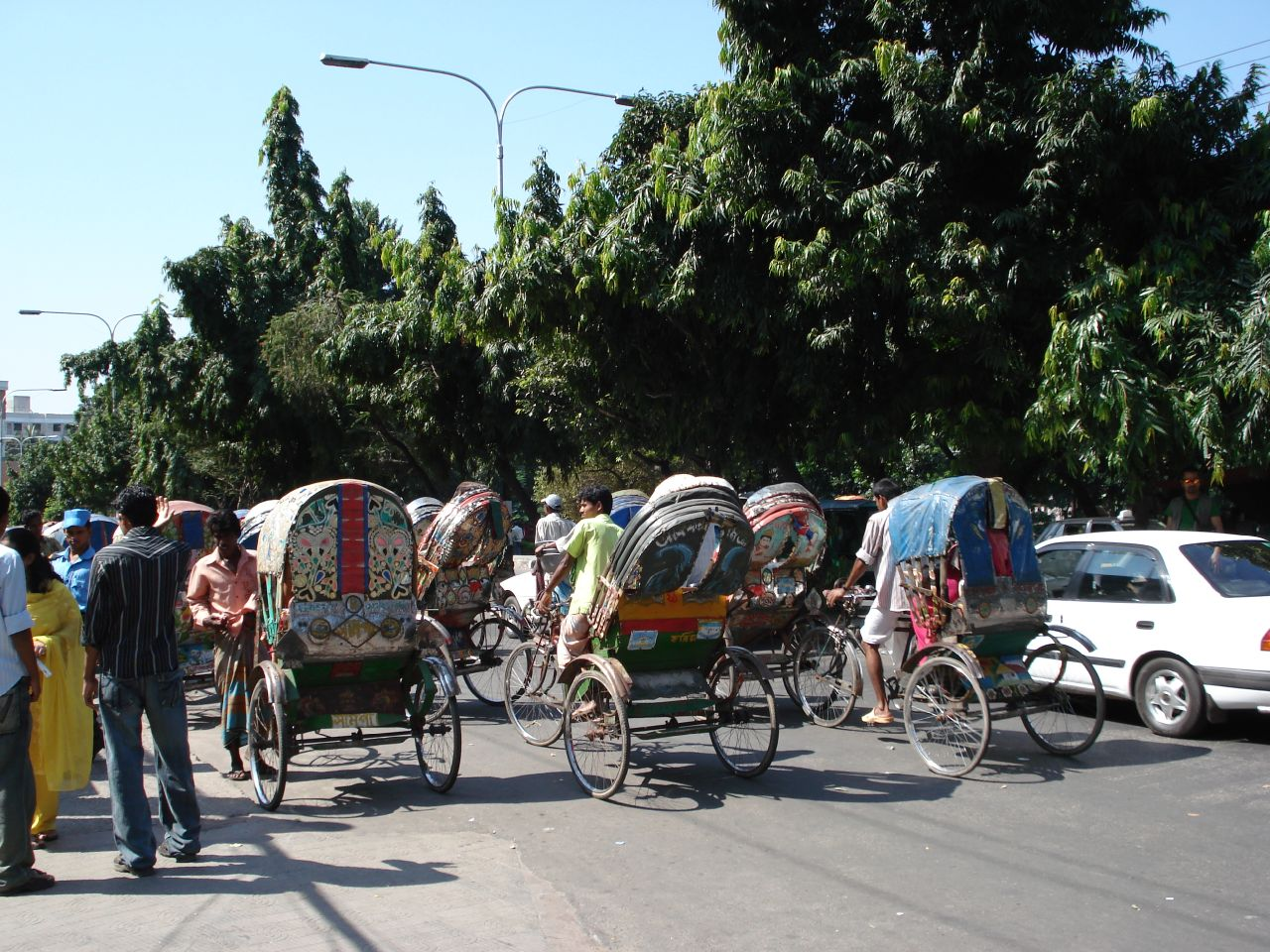
Cycle rickshaws on a busy road at the capital

Dhaka holds the world record for the most cycle rickshaws in one city. The number of rickshaws has grown rapidly, from around 181 in 1947 to approximately 280,000 in 2000. By 2019, more than a million cycle rickshaws were estimated to be active, serving about 7.6 million trips per day (as of 2009). They are preferred for their affordability and ability to easily navigate narrow roads. Despite license issuances being suspended in 1986 and multiple efforts to ban them from roads over the years, the government resumed issuing licenses and guidelines for non-motorised vehicles in the early 2020s, including setting an age limit for drivers. As of 2024, only about 220,379 cycle rickshaws are officially licensed to operate in Dhaka North and Dhaka South city corporations. Rickshaws provide a colossal amount of employment in Dhaka. It is estimated that around 20% of the total population, or about 2.5 million people, rely on rickshaws directly or indirectly.

Battery-run rickshaws, numbering over 200,000 as of 2024, have gained popularity in Dhaka since their introduction in the late 2000s, despite subsequent failed bans. These vehicles are criticised for being unsafe due to their higher speeds and weak brakes, as many are retrofitted cycle rickshaws, mainly limited to alleyways. Another variant have become more prevalent in the suburbs, locally called an "easybike," which is based on a larger, sturdier frame that is industrially manufactured for three-wheelers with a slightly higher passenger capacity.

Rickshaws have been frequently criticised as a major contributor to traffic congestion. Additionally, lead-acid batteries used in electric rickshaws pose environmental and public health hazards and are often charged via illegal electricity connections amid power shortages.

=== Auto-rickshaws ===
Auto-rickshaws, commonly known as "CNGs" due to their compressed natural gas fuel source, are painted green. Over 15,000 legally registered CNGs serve passengers in Dhaka, with thousands more operating illegally. Fares are typically negotiated between drivers and passengers, despite a government mandate in 2015 for fare meters. The fixed rates are ৳40 for the first 2 km, ৳12 per km thereafter, and ৳2 for every minute of waiting. However, drivers often bypass meters due to high demand, low supply of CNGs, and the high cost of living and leasing from owners. CNG-run auto-rickshaws were preceded by two-stroke yellow-and-black "baby taxis" that operated on petrol, which were banned in 2002 due to environmental concerns.

=== Taxis and ride-shares ===
Taxicabs are on the verge of extinction, with the government having no records of actively plying cabs. The service was introduced in 2001 with over 10,000 air-conditioned and non-AC cabs. Contributing factors to their decline include traffic congestion, poor driver management, and deteriorating roads. The final blow came with the introduction of ride-sharing services in 2016. By September 2022, two companies had fewer than 500 registered taxis.

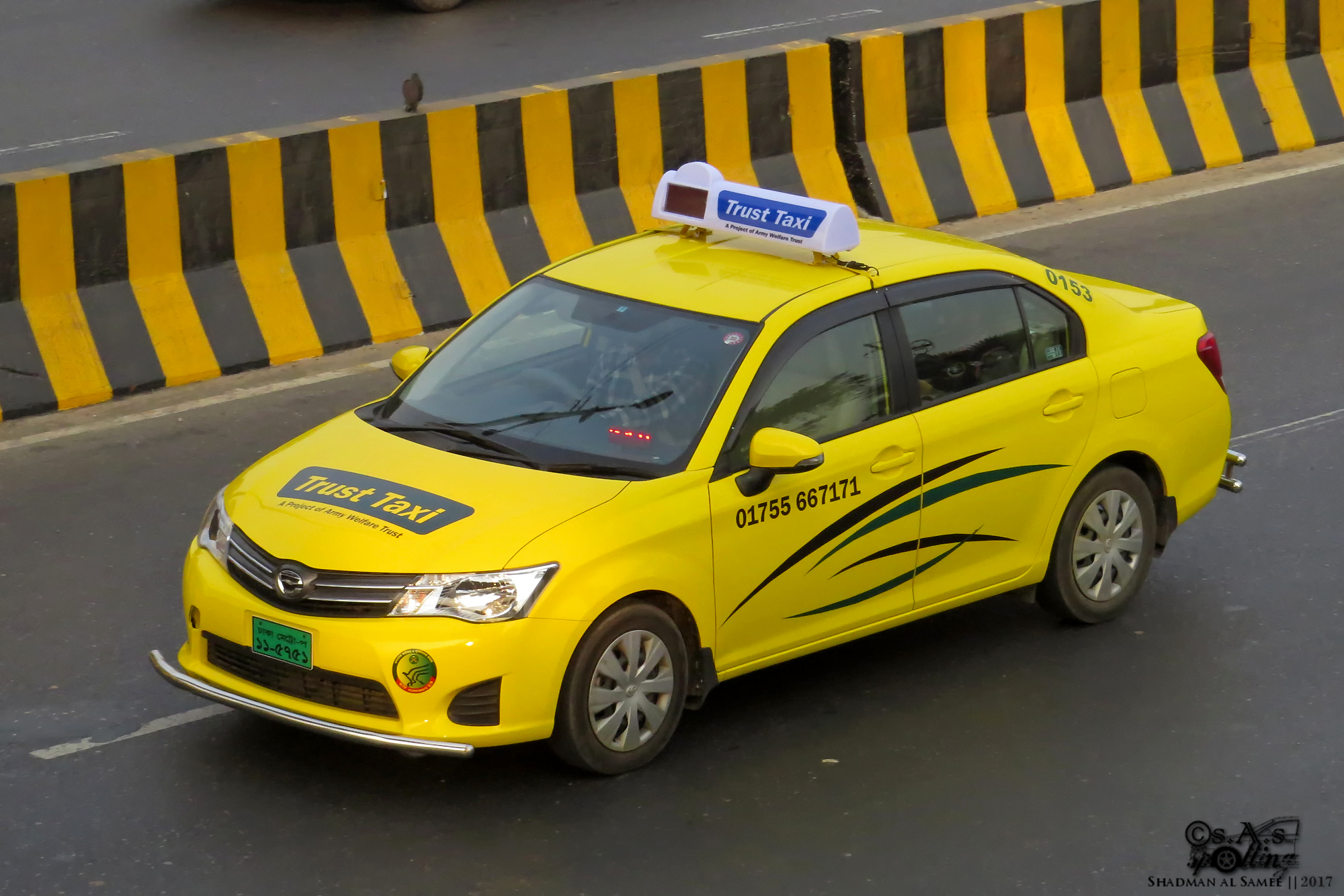
Yellow Toyota Axio taxi

Since 2016, Uber and Pathao have dominated the ride-sharing market in Dhaka, which offer both car and motorcycle services. Motorcycle-based ride-sharing is particularly popular due to its affordability compared to auto-rickshaws and taxis. However, these services face challenges such as drivers refusing to go to certain destinations, not accepting payments via mobile financial services or bank cards, and forcing riders to cancel rides. Additionally, the rise of contractual rides, where drivers avoid using the app to bypass commission fees, poses a significant issue. Ride-sharing services have led to a decline in the use of CNG auto-rickshaws, although Uber has expanded its services to include CNG auto-rickshaws in 2021. As of May 2024, the government is considering granting permits to a company to revive the taxi service in Dhaka.

=== Other transport ===
Although in decline, horse-drawn carriages, locally known as "tomtoms," are still available for passenger transport primarily in the old parts of Dhaka, carrying up to 14 passengers per trip. Introduced as early as the 19th century, they are quickly being replaced by cycle rickshaws. These carriages are criticised for the mistreatment of horses and are expensive to maintain.

== Airports ==
Hazrat Shahjalal International Airport is the largest and busiest airport in the country, handling both domestic and international flights. In 2023, it handled 11,672,879 domestic and international passengers. With the inauguration of the third terminal operations in October 2024, the airport will be able to accommodate around 22 million passengers annually. Domestic flights connect to Chittagong, Sylhet, Rajshahi, Cox's Bazar, Jessore, Barisal, and Saidpur (Rangpur), and international services fly to major cities in Asia, Europe and the Middle East.

== See also ==
- Dhaka Transport Coordination Authority
- Transport in Bangladesh
