= Neela Market =

Market in Dhaka, Bangladesh

- Location: Bholanathpur, Sector 1, Purbachal New Town, Dhaka, Bangladesh; 23.8341065°N 90.4847442°E
- Opening date: 2013
- Environment: Rural
- Goods sold: Vegetables, meats, fishes, street foods, sweets
- Parking: no
- Location within Dhaka division Location within Bangladesh

Neela Market (Bengali: নীলা মার্কেট) is a market situated in Bholanathpur, Sector 1, Purbachal New Town, Dhaka. It is accessible from Purbachal Expressway and people from Dhaka need to cross Balu Bridge to go there.

== History ==
The government of Bangladesh decided to build a new international cricket stadium in Purbachal, a satellite town under development by Rajdhani Unnayan Kartripakkha. For that they acquired 37.5 acre land at Purbachal New Town. In 2013, Ferdousi Alam Neela, an Awami League politician in Rupganj Upazila, illegally built the office of Awami League Club on the stadium's proposed site. Later a market was formed around it and was named after her. As of 2019, the market was demolished more than forty times by government but later it was re-established using political power. However, Golam Dastagir Gazi, parliament member of Narayanganj-1, tried to get the market's permit from Rajdhani Unnayan Kartripakkha but failed and according to Neela it was Gazi who ordered her to establish the market. On 11 February 2026, a fire broke out in the market, completely burning down five of its shops.

== Description ==
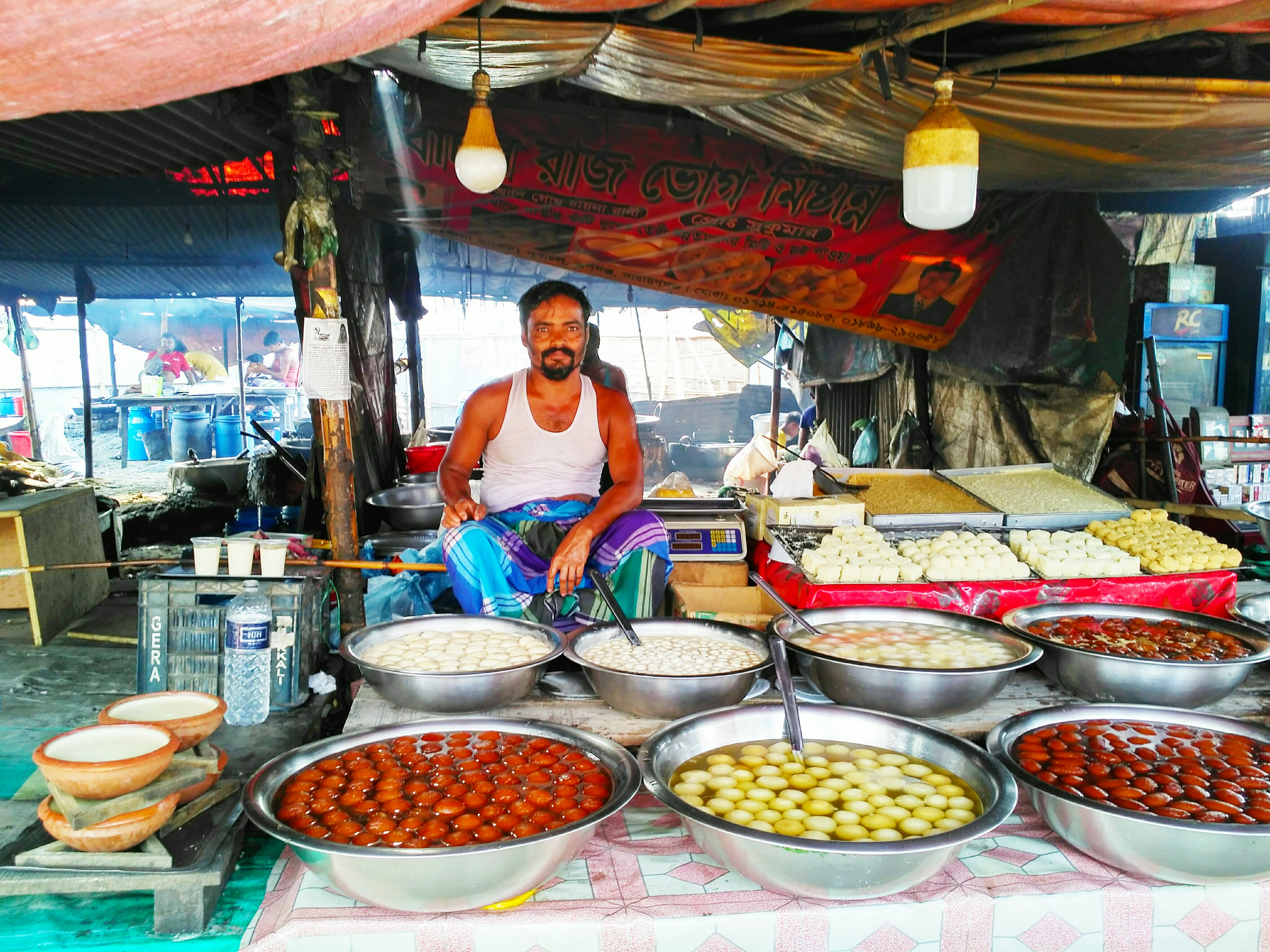
A sweet shop at Neela Market

It is known for its kitchen division from where customers used to buy vegetables, meats and rice for their daily needs. Some of the market's restaurants give room date service and gambling and drug trade is available here. These activities are illegal in the country. There are some Chinese restaurants too. Its layout is like rural structures which attracts visitors. The market is a great place for Sweets which houses sweet shops. It is popular for the food item of Chitai Pitha with duck meat and street foods.
