= Kuril-Purbachal Canals =

Canal in Dhaka, Bangladesh

Kuril-Purbachal Twin Canal
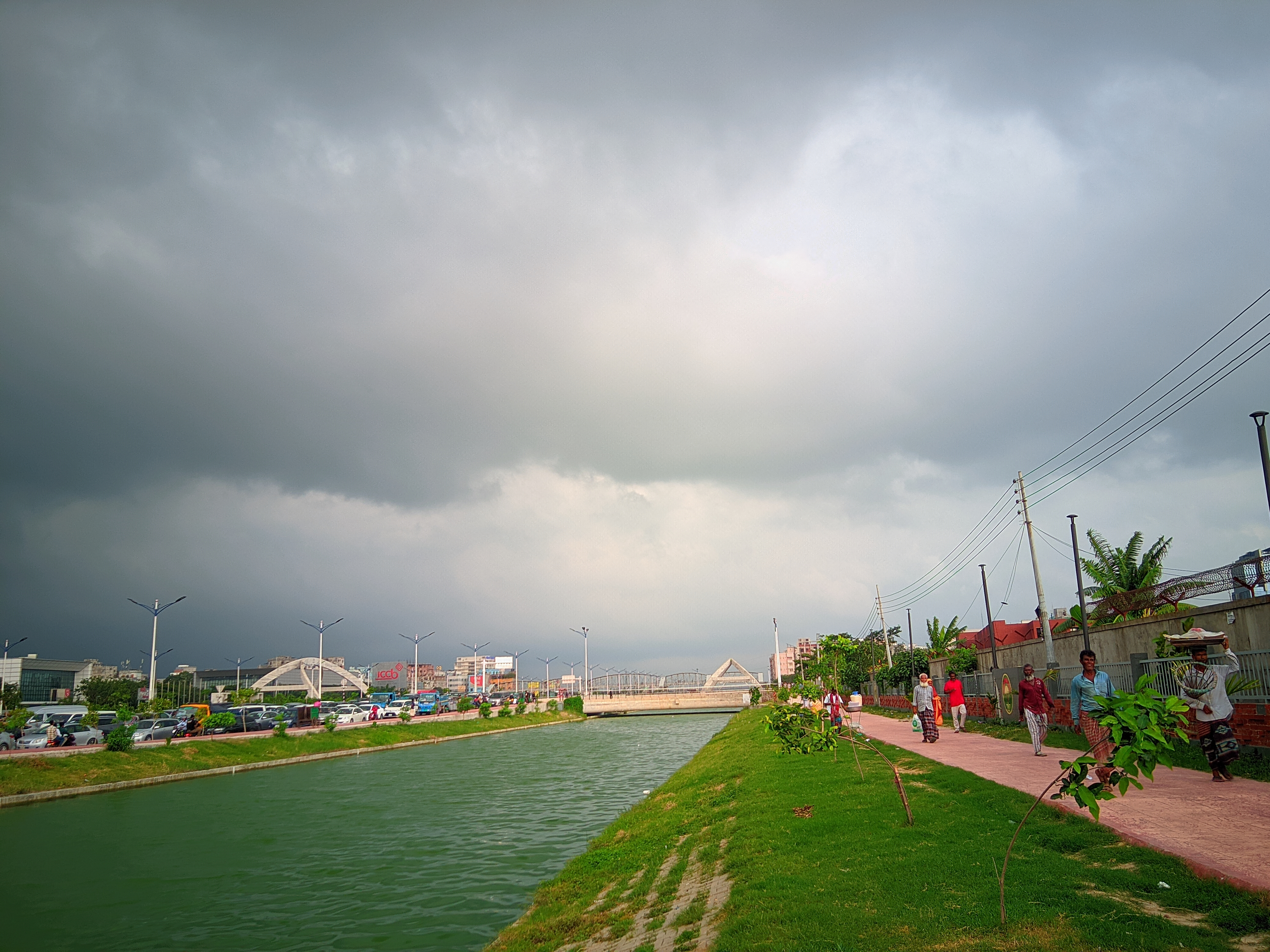
- The canal in 2024
- Location: Purbachal New Town
- Country: Bangladesh
- Coordinates: 23.8301°N 90.4478°E

Specifications
- Length: 6 km (3.7 miles)

History
- Current owner: Rajdhani Unnayan Kartripakkha

Geography
- Start point: Kuril Bishwa Road
- End point: Mostul
- Beginning coordinates: 23.8251°N 90.4223°E
- Ending coordinates: 23.8366°N 90.4765°E
- Connects to: Balu River

The Kuril-Purbachal Canals is a pair of canals in Dhaka, Bangladesh, extending for 6 kilometres along the Purbachal Expressway from Kuril Bishwa Road in the west to the Balu River in the east.

== History ==
According to the Detailed Area Plan prepared by the Capital Development Authority in 2004, there were two 100-foot-wide canals from Kuril to the Balu River in Dhaka, which are currently non-functional. Due to their dysfunction, part of Dhaka suffers from waterlogging during the monsoon season. Therefore, in 2015, the government decided to construct two 100-foot-wide canals along both sides of the 300-feet wide Purbachal Expressway, which was under-construction that time. Additionally, land belonging to 1,200 families was acquired for the canal. Excavation of the canals began on 8 July 2017. The work was scheduled to be completed by 2018. For the canals, the width of the Purbachal Expressway was reduced by 65 feet on both sides. The canal construction project, designed by a team of experts from the Bangladesh University of Engineering and Technology, initially included a 20-foot-wide service road on each side, three U-loops, 15 arch bridges on both sides, and five foot overbridges, but later the service road was replaced with footpaths. In 2018, the revised canal project was approved at a meeting of the Executive Committee of the National Economic Council. Although it was proposed to extend the canal up to the Kanchan Bridge, it was decided in the initial phase to excavate the canals only up to Boalia, and the project was restructured with the target of completion by 2021. After the project deadline was extended in three phases, its construction cost reached ৳10,322 crore. However, canal excavation continued even after 2021. In 2023, before the inauguration of the Purbachal Expressway, the canal excavation was completed.
