= National Cricket Ground (Bangladesh) =

Proposed Cricket stadium in Dhaka, Bangladesh

- Purbachal Cricket Stadium
- Interactive map of National Cricket Ground
- Former names: Sheikh Hasina International Cricket Stadium (until 2024)
- Location: Sector 1, Purbachal Expressway, Purbachal, Dhaka
- Coordinates: 23.8362°N 90.4815°E
- Owner: Bangladesh Cricket Board
- Operator: Bangladesh Cricket Board
- Capacity: 50,000 (expandable to 70,000)
- Executive suites: 120
- Surface: Australian grass
- Acreage: 38 acres (15 ha)
- Public transit: MRT Line 1

Construction
- Groundbreaking: 28 November 2019
- Cost: ৳1300 crore (US$110 million)
- Architect: Populous
- Main contractors: Populous; Rajuk

Tenants
- Dhaka Capitals (Starting 2026–27 season)

National Cricket Ground (Bengali: ন্যাশনাল ক্রিকেট গ্রাউন্ড) is a proposed cricket stadium located in Sector-1 of multi-billion dollar Purbachal New Town on the outskirts of Dhaka, Bangladesh.

The stadium is going to be built by Bangladesh Cricket Board and it is the second stadium after Sheikh Kamal International Cricket Stadium, Cox's Bazar which is fully owned by BCB. Planned to open in 2026, the stadium will serve as the headquarter of Bangladesh Cricket Board, home to Bangladesh national cricket team and Dhaka franchise of Bangladesh Premier League.

After the fall of the Sheikh Hasina led Awami League government, Sheikh Hasina International Cricket Stadium was renamed to National Cricket Ground (NCG).

== Overview ==
NCG will be developed as a multi-function area. After the inauguration of the stadium, Bangladesh Cricket Board will shift its headquarter to this venue from Sher-e-Bangla National Cricket Stadium. Other than a cricket stadium, the complex will also have indoor sports and water sports facilities. Other than the sports facilities, transit-oriented development with a five-star hotel would be developed in the stadium area. An outer stadium with a capacity of at least 2,500 spectators will also be developed which can be used for art performances besides sports.

The stadium is being constructed in Sector I of Purbachal New Town, in close proximity to multi-billion dollars Iconic City development project. The stadium will have five-storied pavilion, 3-tier stands with a capacity of 50,000, and the option to add at least 25,000 additional seats. The budget for the development of the stadium is estimated at ৳1300-crores ($140 million), making it the most expensive cricket stadium in Asia. From the budget, ৳37 crores were allocated towards the development of a separate practice facility for Bangladesh national cricket team. In April 2023, BCB also expressed its view to accommodate five other sports federations of the country on the premise of this venue.

== Development ==
The venue is located in about 38 acres (15 ha) of land east of Turag River at Purbachal Express Highway. Groundbreaking of the ৳1100 crore (US$90 million) stadium began in November 2019 and is expected to be completed by December 2022. Upon completion in 2022, The stadium will become the third largest-ever cricket stadium in terms of capacity, and the most expensive cricket stadium in Asia.

In August 2019, the Bangladesh Cricket Board released a notice of Expression of Interest (EOI), inviting consultancy firms to submit detailed designs and construction plans for the stadium. But the designing and construction process was delayed due to COVID-19 pandemic.

In October 2022, Australia-based architectural firm Populous was awarded the contract to design and build the stadium in a 30-months timeframe.

In April 2023, it was reported that BCB sent a letter to National Board of Revenue seeking custom duties and tax exemptions on the construction materials and all types of expenses related to this project. In November 2023, BCB invited tenders from international firms for the construction of the stadium.

On 29 August 2024, a while after Prime Minister Sheikh Hasina was ousted from office and fled the country, during the first board meeting held after Faruque Ahmed became president of BCB, the tender process of the stadium's construction was canceled. Ahmed has also stated later on that BCB could not afford the fund for the stadium project.

In March 2025, BCB changed the name of the venue from Sheikh Hasina International Cricket Stadium also known as The Boat to National Cricket Ground (NCG).

== See also ==
- List of megaprojects in Bangladesh
- Stadiums in Bangladesh
