= Purbachal =

Major neighbourhood of Dhaka

Purbachal পূর্বাচল
- Neighbourhood
- Central district plan of Purbachal
- Expandable map of Purbachal
- Location of Purbachal within Dhaka Location of Purbachal within Dhaka Division Location of Purbachal within Bangladesh
- Coordinates: 23°51′23″N 90°30′11″E
- Country: Bangladesh
- Division: Dhaka Division
- District: Dhaka District
- City Corporation: Dhaka North City Corporation
- Established: 1996

Area
  - Total: 25.14 km^{2} (9.71 sq mi)
- Time zone: UTC+6 (Bangladesh Time)
- Postal Code: 1460
- Area code: 02

Purbachal New Town Project (Bengali: পূর্বাচল নতুন শহর প্রকল্প) or formerly Purbachal Residential Model Town is the biggest planned township in Bangladesh. The project area consists of about 6,213 acres (25.14 km^{2}) land located between the Shitalakshya and the Balu rivers in the northeastern side of Dhaka. The township is linked with a fourteen-lane expressway from the Airport Road-Progati Sarani intersection in Dhaka. The plan includes the provision of approximately 26,000 residential plots of various sizes and 62,000 apartments, complete with essential infrastructure and urban amenities.

In 2022, a central business district was announced to be constructed at Purbachal. Covering an area of 114 acres, its key attraction is The Tri-Tower, a collection of three skyscrapers called Language Tower, Liberation Tower and Legacy Tower, which will offer upscale real estate tailored to the requirements of multinational corporations. Upon completion, the area would reportedly offer a sophisticated business center, commercial spaces, retail outlets, luxurious apartments, convention facilities, a hospital, an international school, and various other essential community services.

The project, initiated in 1995, has experienced several delays and the completion date was extended by one and a half years, from June 2022 to December 2024. Japanese construction giant Kajima Corporation, along with their Bangladeshi partner Sikder Group, has announced the 111-storied Legacy Tower in sector 19 would be completed in 2034.

On 1 July 2026, Purbachal was incorporated into Dhaka District for administrative convenience. It previously straddled between Rupganj Upazila of Narayanganj District and Kaliganj Upazila of Gazipur District.

== Background ==
Dhaka has transformed into one of the busiest and most densely populated cities, leading to a significant shortage of adequate housing for its inhabitants. Consequently, some residential areas within Dhaka have become increasingly overcrowded and unsanitary, contributing to an unhealthy living environment. To alleviate the population pressure on Dhaka, it was imperative to develop the surrounding areas in a systematic manner and create additional high-quality permanent residential accommodations for the vast population.

The complete detailed area plan was divided into five groups and a number of small locations. These were awarded to five firms—Development Design Consultants, Engineering and Planning Consultants, GBL Group, Sheltech, and BETS Consulting Services.

== Land use ==
Within this urban area, 33% of the land is designated for residential buildings. Furthermore, 26% is allocated for roads and sidewalks, while 9% is devoted to essential infrastructure encompassing health, education, social, and utility services. Canals and lakes cover 8% of the area, with 7% dedicated to administrative and commercial functions. Additionally, 6% of the land is set aside for forests, eco-parks, and green spaces. Residential housing blocks occupy 6%, while 5% of the land is preserved for recreational purposes within this city. Government also announced to set up four police stations and six investigation centres in Purbachal.

== Progress ==
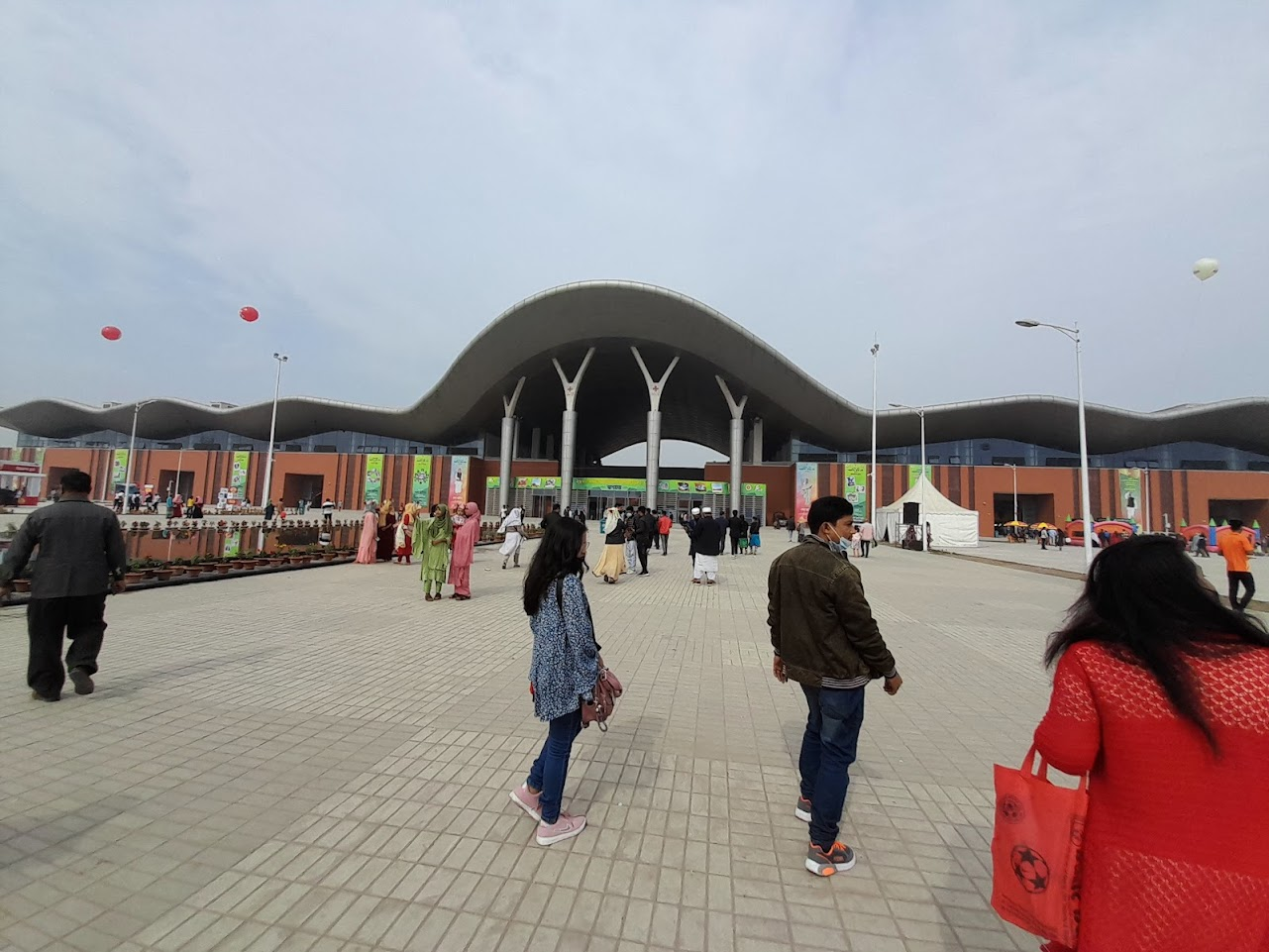
Dhaka International Trade Fair held at the Bangladesh–China Friendship Exhibition Center in Purbachal

Site development works of sector 1–5, 11 to 14 & 17 have nearly been completed. For other sectors the site development works are progressing smoothly. Estimate for site development at Gazipur part has been completed and tendering for execution is under process. Road construction works in sector no 1 to 5, 11, 13, 14 & 17 have nearly been completed. For other sectors the road construction works are ongoing. At 1st phase 7 no.s of bridge construction work are ongoing. At 2nd phase 4 no.s of bridge construction work are ongoing. Rest of the bridges are in the process of tendering. Necessary actions are being taken for establishing of utility services viz electricity, gas, water supply, sewerage and telecommunication etc. through the connection authority. The handing over of plots in the sectors 4, 5 and 17 has started in March 2011. Handing over of plot in the sectors 3, 11, 12,13 and 14 is expected to be started quickly.

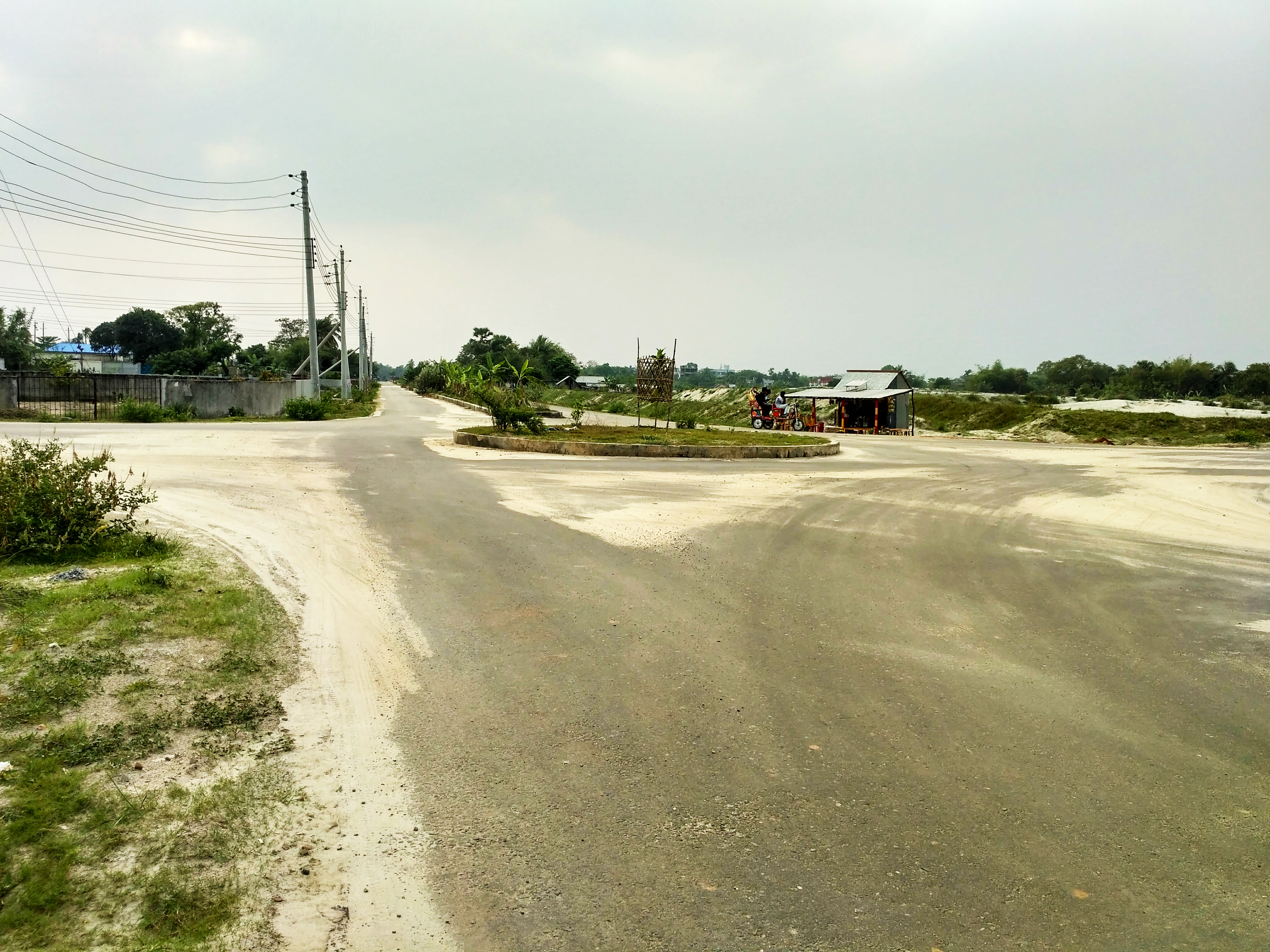
A cross-roads at Purbachal New Town Sector-13 (2019)

It may take five more years to hand over plots to 25,000 owners, who have fallen in uncertainty. The stipulated time to complete the project was 2008. But it may take more time as only 25 per cent work had so far been completed. According to the project map, there will be 10 bridges, but no tender to this effect was floated. Only 15 kilometer roads inside the project have been completed out of 140 kilometers in the sectors 1, 4, 5, 11, and 17. The handing over of plots in the sectors 4, 5 and 17 has been started. No necessary steps have been taken for establishing utility services like electricity, gas, water supply, sewerage and telecommunications.

On 30 June 2026, in the 121st session of the National Implementation Committee for Administrative Realignment (NICAR) chaired by Prime Minister Tarique Rahman, the decision to bring the whole Purbachal New Town Project under Dhaka District was, upon the recommendation from the Ministry of Housing and Public Works in order to avoid administrative complications in the area. Previously, it has been scattered across Dhaka, Rupganj Upazila of Narayanganj District and Kaliganj Upazila of Gazipur District.

== Criticisms ==
=== Delays and mismanagement ===
Initially slated for completion by early 2010s, the project has faced prolonged delays, with the deadline extended seven times. Cited causes include the COVID-19 pandemic, legal disputes, local resistance and relocation delays. As of 2024, large parts of the area remain underdeveloped or vacant. Cases have been filed in 2025 against 100 individuals, including Prime Minister Sheikh Hasina and members of her family, over alleged irregularities in plot allocations for the project.

=== Inadequate infrastructure and services ===
While roads have been constructed, many areas still lack water supply, electricity, gas connections, and sewage infrastructure. There is a lack of operational schools, markets, hospitals, fire stations, and police services. Power distribution and internet lines are being installed overhead, abandoning the original plan for underground infrastructure due to funding constraints.

=== Environmental degradation ===
The authority has faced criticism for filling wetlands, clearing vegetation, and removing forested areas without obtaining environmental clearance. A 144-acre (0.58 km^{2}) Sal forest in Purbachal, previously under threat, has been included in conservation efforts in 2025.

== Landmarks ==
- Purbachal Expressway
- Dhaka Bypass Expressway
- MRT Line 1
- Dhaka University 2nd campus
- The Tri-Tower
  - Language Tower
  - Liberation Tower
  - Legacy Tower
- Purbachal International Cricket Stadium
- Purbachal Wildlife Sanctuary
- Kuril-Purbachal Canals
- Purbachal Central Business District
- Bangladesh–China Friendship Exhibition Center
- Neela Market

== See also ==
- Jolshiri Abashon, also being developed near Purbachal
