= Hongqi Bridge =

Hongqi Bridge 红旗大桥
- Coordinates: 31°49′14″N 101°54′31″E
- Carried: China National Highway 317
- Locale: Maerkang county-level city, Aba Tibetan and Qiang Autonomous Prefecture, Sichuan, China
- Official name: Hongqi Grand Bridge

Characteristics
- Total length: 758 metres (2,487 ft)
- Height: 172 metres (564 ft)
- Longest span: 220 metres (720 ft)
- No. of spans: 3 (central section)

History
- Construction end: 14 January 2025
- Construction cost: 300 million RMB
- Opened: 13 April 2025
- Collapsed: 11 November 2025 (western approach)

Statistics
- Daily traffic: 2 lanes motorway

Location
- Interactive map of Hongqi Bridge

Hongqi Bridge was a 172-metre (564 ft) tall elevated structure across a steep canyon in Barkam in the Ngawa Tibetan and Qiang Autonomous Prefecture of Sichuan Province, China, spanning the Zumuzu River, eastern tributary of the Dadu River. It was an important waypoint located within Sichuan connecting the rest of China to the Tibet Autonomous Region. The bridge was also part of China National Highway 317 of the Chinese highway network and travels near the Shuangjiangkou Dam.

Chengdu Engineering Corporation, a subsidiary of China Power Construction Corporation under the Assets Supervision and Administration Commission, handled the bridge's design and construction. The Sichuan Expressway Construction and Development Group posted a now-deleted video of the final concrete pouring on 14 January 2025, signifying the project's completion after five years of construction. The bridge was opened to traffic on 13 April 2025. On 11 November 2025, just days after the inauguration of the nearby Shuangjiangkou Dam, a landslide caused the collapse of the western bridge approach and its part of the roadbed.

== Characteristics ==
Hongqi Bridge was a cantilevered concrete bridge with a total length of 758 metres (2,487 ft). The central section consisted of a main span of 220 metres (720 ft) flanked by two spans of 120 metres (390 ft) each, supported by piers as tall as 172 metres (564 ft) above the foundation. The bridge deck was a continuous rigid frame structure made of prestressed concrete, consisting of the three central spans connected as a single unit. The bridge carried a two-lane road, which exited a tunnel on the steep east (left) bank, crossing the bridge and its approaches, and entered a tunnel on the steep west (right) bank.

== Collapse ==
The bridge was evacuated and closed to traffic on 10 November 2025 by Maerkang city officials when road cracks and shifting terrain, along with a crack in the bridge structure were discovered by inspection officials at 3pm. Conditions worsened throughout 11 November before the bridge partially collapsed at 4:10pm. No casualties were reported.

Satellite imagery after the collapse showed the western approach in rubble, while the main central section of the bridge appeared intact with the western end of the central section in mid-air, unattached and unsupported. No timeline for repairing or rebuilding the bridge has been announced.

Footage of the collapse was posted on social media. The majority of comments praised the government's handling of the situation and evacuation.

=== Causes ===
The authorities have stated that a landslide next to the bridge had caused the collapse and denied any quality issues.

Several netizens on the Chinese internet have questioned the official claim that the collapse was precipitated by the landslide, noting that the area was known for landslides. State media Jimu News broadcast a bridge expert stating that if the project had been given the go-ahead despite the unstable terrain, slope management should have been factored into its design.

== See also ==
- Sichuan Road and Bridge Group
