= Liberation Tower (Purbachal, Dhaka) =

- Interactive map of the Liberation Tower area

General information
- Status: Under construction
- Type: Commercial
- Architectural style: Neo-futurism
- Location: Central Business District, Sector 19, Dhaka, Bangladesh
- Coordinates: 23°51′28″N 90°30′59″E
- Construction started: September 29, 2021
- Estimated completion: 2030

Height
- Architectural: 323 m (1,060 ft)
- Tip: 338 m (1,109 ft)

Technical details
- Floor count: 71

Design and construction
- Architect: JP Architect
- Architecture firm: Heerim Architects and Planners
- Developer: Power-Pac Holdings Limited

Liberation Tower is an under-construction skyscraper that will be built in Central Business District (CBD) at Purbachal Sector 19 in Dhaka, Bangladesh. The 71-floor and 323-meter high building is a part of Bangabandhu Tri-Towers project, which will include two other towers: Language Tower (244m) and Legacy Tower (428m).
