= Sichuan Road and Bridge Group =

Chinese engineering and construction company

- Native name: 四川路桥集团
- Type: State-owned enterprise
- Industry: Construction, Mining
- Founded: 1998
- Headquarters: Chengdu, Sichuan, China
- Area served: Worldwide
- Number of employees: Over 16,000
- Parent: Shudao Investment Group
- Subsidiaries: Sichuan Road & Bridge Mining Investment Development Corp. Ltd.
- Website: Official website

Sichuan Road and Bridge Group (SRBG) is a Chinese state-owned enterprise specializing in engineering, construction, and mining operations.

== History ==
Established in 1998 and headquartered in Chengdu, Sichuan Province, the company is a subsidiary of Shudao Investment Group. SRBG has expanded its business both domestically and internationally through major infrastructure and mining projects.

In February 2024, SRBG was the subject of an official investigation following a deadly flash flood in Jinyang County, Sichuan Province. The disaster, which occurred in August 2023, killed six and left 46 people missing after floodwaters destroyed a workers’ residence operated by SRBG. According to the provincial government’s investigation, the company unlawfully occupied river channels for residential use during flood season and failed to evacuate workers in time. The report also revealed that employees of SRBG and its parent, Shudao Investment Group, had collaborated to falsify the number of missing persons. Twelve employees were prosecuted for false reporting and negligence, and over 120 Communist Party members and local officials faced disciplinary action for dereliction of duty.

In November 2025, the 758 meter long Hongqi Bridge in Sichuan (near Maerkang) collapsed only a few months after SRBG had released a promotional video celebrating its completion.

== International projects ==
SRBG has undertaken various international projects across multiple countries:

- Norway: In 2013, SRBG was awarded a €93 million contract to construct the steelwork for the 1,533-meter-long Hålogaland Bridge, which opened to traffic in December 2018. The bridge was the longest suspension bridge within the Arctic Circle at the time.
- Bangladesh: The company is part of a consortium involved in the construction of the 48 km Dhaka Bypass Expressway under a public-private partnership model, with construction beginning in December 2019.
- Tunisia: In 2024, SRBG began construction of the Bizerte Bridge, which will become Tunisia’s largest bridge upon completion. The project aims to ease traffic congestion across the Bizerte Canal and is scheduled for completion within three years.
- Eritrea: SRBG has maintained operations in Eritrea since 1996, working on projects such as roads, hospitals, and educational institutions, while also investing in the mining sector.

== Mining activities ==
SRBG operates in the mining industry through its subsidiary, Sichuan Road & Bridge Mining Investment Development Corp. Ltd.:

- Asmara Project: In November 2015, SRBG acquired a 60% stake in the Asmara Mining Share Company from Sunridge Gold Ltd. for US$65 million. The Asmara project is a copper-gold-polymetallic mine. By 2021, project financing was secured, and mine development was progressing.
- Colluli Potash Project: In January 2023, SRBG announced plans to acquire a 50% stake in the Colluli Mining Share Company, which owns the Colluli potash deposit. The total investment for the acquisition and development is expected to be around US$950 million.

== Domestic projects ==
Domestically, SRBG has led several key infrastructure developments:

- Xingkang Bridge: Completed in 2018, this suspension bridge over the Dadu River in Sichuan features a main span of 1,100 meters and connects key expressway routes.
- Bosideng Bridge: Opened in 2012, the Bosideng Bridge crosses the Yangtze River in Sichuan. Its main span of 530 meters makes it one of the longest arch bridges globally.
