= Legacy Tower (Purbachal, Dhaka) =

Tallest future building in Bangladesh

- Interactive map of the Legacy Tower area
- Alternative names: লিগ্যাসি টাওয়ার

General information
- Status: Under construction
- Type: Commercial
- Architectural style: Neo-futurism
- Location: Central Business District, Sector 19, Dhaka, Bangladesh
- Coordinates: 23°51′28″N 90°30′59″E
- Groundbreaking: September 10, 2020
- Construction started: December 17, 2020
- Estimated completion: 2032

Height
- Architectural: 468 m (1,535 ft)
- Tip: 468 m (1,535 ft)

Technical details
- Floor count: 111

Design and construction
- Architecture firm: Heerim Architects and Planners
- Developer: Power-Pac Holdings Limited

The Legacy Tower is an under-construction supertall skyscraper in Dhaka, Bangladesh. The skyscraper is a part of the Bangabandhu tri-tower. Alongside the 71-floor Liberation Tower and the 52-floor Language Tower, it serves as the centerpiece of the US$12 billion central business district development project in Purbachal. The 111-floor tower will rise 468 m (1,535 ft) tall.

The construction of the tri-towers officially commenced on 10 September 2020. The design, created by Heerim Architects and Planners of South Korea incorporates many unique structural and aesthetic features such as solar glass and automatic waste-management systems. As a result, a large portion of the towers' energy demand will be met with renewable energy. The structural consultancy of the project is being provided by Archetype Group of France. The towers are being created by PowerPac Holdings Limited, a joint consortium of Kajima Corporation and Sikder Group.

== Location ==
The Legacy Tower is located in Purbachal, Dhaka.

== History ==
The concept for a supertall-skyscraper was first conceived by Bangladeshi-American industrialist Kali Prodip Chaudhuri. After multiple visits to Bangladesh by delegations of KPC Group, Purbachal was finalized as the location for the skyscraper. Shortly prior to official approval by Rajdhani Unnayan Kartripakkha (RAJUK), the project was shelved over land and other financial disputes. After objection from Civil Aviation Authority, Bangladesh (CAAB) over the height of the tallest skyscraper, the design was revised and the new design of the project was revived in 2019, under public-private partnership between the Government of Bangladesh and Powerpac Holdings Limited. The company purchased 46.1 hectares of the site of the Purbachal new town sector 19 in late 2019. In 2020, The Daily Star has reported that Powerpac Holdings Limited have secured ৳600 billion ($7.7 billion) from foreign investments and in process of acquiring additional ৳360 billion ($4.3 billion) in investments. The developer announced that in place of initial 142-story supertall skyscraper, they would construct 111-story Legacy Tower, 71-story Liberation tower and 51-story Language tower. The three towers will be surrounded by 38 additional skyscrapers, which will be constructed during the second phase of the Purbachal CBD project.

== Technologies ==
The building will be able generate electricity through solar and convert waste to energy. The tower will also include sky deck for tourists (Purbachal Eye), an observatory (Dhaka Sky), and a Damper design similar to Taipei 101 (Dhaka Moon).

== Surrounding skyscrapers ==
The Bangabandhu tri-tower project is the centerpiece of Purbachal Central Business District development project. Alongside Legacy tower, the Tri-tower project will include two other towers:

- Liberation Tower: The Liberation Tower is a 71-floor commercial tower with a height of 323 m (1,060 ft).
- Language Tower: The Language Tower is a 52-floor commercial tower with a height of 244 m (801 ft).

The Purbachal CBD will include 38 other towers ranging from 35 to 50 floor. According to the project blueprint, the township will include:

- Purbachal Convention Centre: The Convention Centre is a 45-floor commercial tower with a height of 220 m (720 ft).
- Purbachal Grade A Offices: The Office Towers is 45-floor commercial tower with height of 225 m (738 ft).
- Purbachal Business Hotel: The Business Hotel is 42-floor tower with height of at least 205 m (673 ft).
- Purbachal Residential Zone: The ten residential towers are 42-floor towers with height of 170 m (560 ft).
- Purbachal Infra Zone: The ten commercial towers are 42-floor towers with height of 147 m (482 ft).

== See also ==
- List of tallest buildings in Bangladesh
- List of tallest buildings in Dhaka
- List of tallest buildings in the world
