= Leguna =

Type of passenger vehicle

- Human hauler
- Also known as: Laguna; human hauler
- Class: Informal paratransit / modified utility vehicle
- Origin: Bangladesh
- In service: c. early 2000s – present
- Seating capacity: 11–14 passengers
- Base vehicle: Imported light-commercial chassis with locally built passenger body
- Primary markets: Dhaka and other Bangladeshi cities and district towns
- Regulatory status: Largely informal; mostly without route permits or fitness certificates
- Related vehicles: Nosimon · Korimon · Easy bike

Leguna (also spelled Laguna, and more formally known in Bangladesh as a human hauler) is a class of small, informal passenger vehicle that has become a fixture of urban and peri-urban transport in Bangladesh, particularly in the capital, Dhaka, since the early 2000s. A typical leguna is built by fitting a locally made passenger body, with two facing benches, onto an imported light commercial vehicle chassis originally designed to carry freight, producing a vehicle that seats 11 to 14 passengers on short, fixed routes that larger buses do not adequately serve.

The vehicle occupies an unusual place in Bangladeshi public life. It is officially classified by the Bangladesh Road Transport Authority (BRTA) as a modified utility vehicle operating outside the formal transport permitting system, and it appears regularly in the national press in connection with road accidents, unlicensed and underage drivers, and repeated but only partially enforced government bans. At the same time, it is a cheap, seated alternative to standing-room-only buses for hundreds of thousands of daily commuters, an entry point into paid work for thousands of drivers and their young helpers, and a recognisable enough part of the capital's streetscape to have been described by the celebrated Bangladeshi novelist Humayun Ahmed, in one of his Himu novels, as a blessing for Dhaka's roads.

== Etymology and names ==
The precise origin of the term leguna is not well documented in available sources. It is used interchangeably with laguna in both journalism and academic writing on Dhaka's transport system, while its official Bangladeshi regulatory designation is simply "human hauler," a literal description of its function rather than a proper name. The vehicle should not be confused with nosimon and korimon, a related but distinct family of improvised three-wheeled vehicles, typically built around shallow tube-well or irrigation-pump engines, that serve a similar function in rural areas of Bangladesh and have their own separate history of court bans.

== History ==
Human haulers were introduced to Dhaka's streets in the early 2000s, as vehicle owners and mechanics adapted small pickups and mini-trucks — vehicles licensed to carry freight — into makeshift passenger carriers, helping to fill gaps left by the city's overstretched and poorly managed bus network. Rapid population growth, a chronic shortage of formal public transport capacity, and heavy urban congestion created conditions in which such informal solutions could proliferate quickly, echoing the earlier emergence of the rural nosimon and korimon.

By the 2010s the vehicles had become numerous enough to draw sustained regulatory attention. The Dhaka Transport Coordination Authority's 2011 Bus Route Regulatory Reform Implementation Study froze the issuance of new route permits for human haulers, alongside minibuses, meaning that in principle only existing permit-holders have since been able to renew. In practice, the fleet has continued to grow regardless: BRTA figures cited in various years put the number of registered human haulers in Dhaka anywhere from roughly 2,400 to just over 5,000, within a nationwide total of around 20,000 registered modified utility vehicles. The spread between these figures likely reflects both genuine year-on-year growth and the inherent difficulty of counting a fleet that operates largely outside formal oversight.

== Design and construction ==
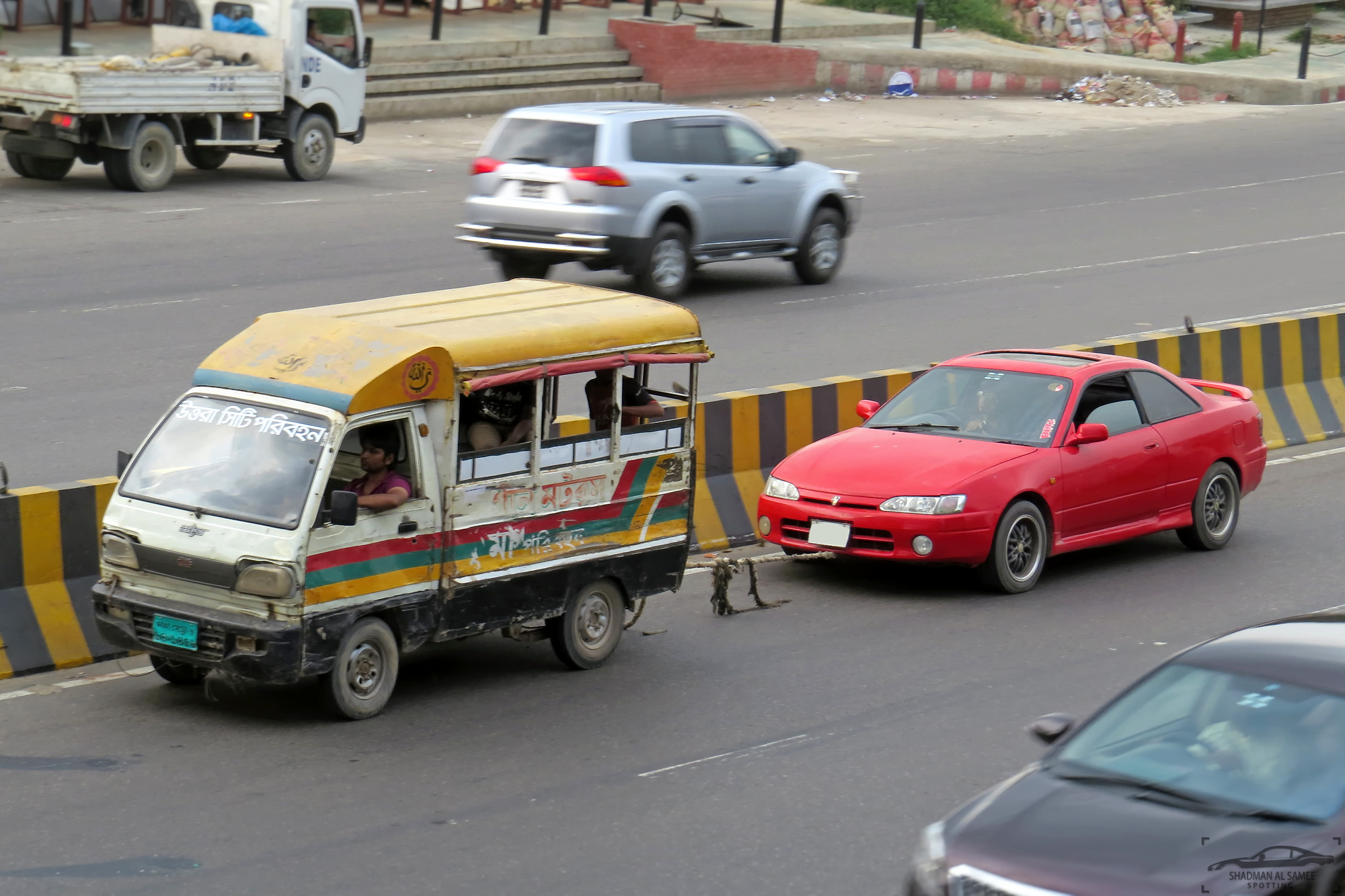
A Leguna in Dhaka streets

A leguna begins life as an imported chassis intended for light commercial freight use, typically rated to carry one to one-and-a-half tonnes of goods. After importation, the chassis is fitted with a body built locally at small workshops, incorporating two long facing benches down each side of an open or semi-enclosed rear cabin and a step-up entrance at the back; this arrangement seats 11 to 14 people, including the driver. Because the underlying chassis and suspension were engineered for evenly distributed cargo rather than the higher, less stable centre of gravity created by seated passengers, transport engineers and BRTA officials have repeatedly described the resulting vehicle as structurally ill-suited to its actual use, with low stability that leaves it especially vulnerable in collisions with larger vehicles such as buses.

Some operators go further and convert other vehicle types — including old microbuses — doubling or more their original seating capacity, a practice implicated in some of the more serious recorded accidents involving the category. In one documented case, an owner in Pabna spent roughly Tk 1.5 lakh (150,000 taka) converting a used microbus, originally bought for about Tk 1 lakh, into a 16-seat human hauler, on top of loading additional passengers onto its roof.

== Operation ==
=== Routes and fares ===
Legunas typically run short, fixed routes of a few kilometres, often linking a residential area to a nearby commercial hub, transport interchange, or industrial zone — corridors that formal bus services skip or serve poorly. Long-documented Dhaka routes include Mirpur-1 to Mohakhali, Khilgaon to Gulistan, Mirpur-2 to Farmgate, Shonir Akhra to Nilkhet, and Mohammadpur to Farmgate, alongside peri-urban corridors such as Mirpur to Savar and the Ashulia industrial belt northwest of the capital. Estimates of daily trips per vehicle vary — from around seven to as many as twelve to fifteen — at typical per-trip earnings in the region of Tk 300. One 2021 estimate put total leguna ridership in Dhaka at around 1.8 lakh (180,000) passengers a day, carried by an estimated 2,400 vehicles.

=== Economic structure ===
The leguna trade runs on a small, informal hierarchy: a vehicle owner (who may or may not also drive), a driver, and a young helper who collects fares and calls out the route to potential passengers. Of the roughly Tk 300 collected per trip, a driver typically keeps Tk 50 to 80, while a helper—frequently a child or young teenager—earns only Tk 10 to 20. This arrangement functions as a rough apprenticeship system, in which helpers who spend enough time on the vehicle's step-board informally graduate into driving roles of their own, a pathway that has drawn criticism from labour rights advocates given that Bangladeshi law bars anyone under eighteen from working as a vehicle conductor. Beyond wages, drivers and owners have also reported making informal daily or monthly payments—to local groups affiliated with political parties, and in some cases to police—simply to keep operating on a given route; a 2026 investigation into organised extortion in Dhaka listed monthly payments from leguna operators as one recurring income stream for armed extortion networks active in the capital.

== Society and culture ==
=== Livelihoods ===
For many drivers, leguna driving is an accessible, if precarious, first step into urban wage work, requiring neither the capital of vehicle ownership nor, in practice, the formal licence and training the law technically requires. Competition over routes and queue position among drivers can itself turn hostile: in early 2026, a Dhaka leguna driver died after being attacked by fellow drivers in the capital's Jatrabari area following a dispute over vehicle queuing, according to police investigators, who said the killing was unrelated to extortion.

=== Women in the driver's seat ===
Leguna driving remains an overwhelmingly male occupation, but it has also produced some of the more visible examples of women entering Bangladesh's male-dominated public transport workforce. Mukti Rani, who moved to Dhaka from a village in Tangail District as a child and worked for years in a garment factory, became a human hauler driver on the Ashulia route with the backing of her father and brother, despite her mother's fears for her safety and hostility from other drivers when she began; she has said she hopes her example will encourage more women into the profession. Women drivers in Bangladesh, including in the leguna trade, continue to report harassment, safety concerns while parking or driving after dark, and a lack of gender-sensitive transport infrastructure as obstacles to entering the profession more widely.

=== Cultural representation ===
The leguna's ubiquity has secured it a small but notable place in Bangladeshi popular culture. The novelist Humayun Ahmed, one of the most widely read authors in modern Bengali literature, referred to the leguna as a blessing for Dhaka's roads in one of his popular Himu novels, a characterisation frequently echoed since by journalists writing about the vehicle. Commuters and commentators alike have noted the practical, informally acquired knowledge of leguna drivers and their helpers, who navigate the capital's dense, poorly signed street network and its shifting daily congestion patterns without formal maps or satellite navigation, relying instead on routes and habits built up over years on the same stretch of road.

== Regulation and safety ==
=== Safety record ===
The leguna's structural limitations, overcrowding, and frequent staffing by unlicensed, underage drivers have made it a recurring subject of road safety research and reporting in Bangladesh, though published casualty figures vary considerably by source and reporting period. Bangladesh University of Engineering and Technology's Accident Research Institute (ARI) recorded 48 deaths and 81 injuries across 39 accidents involving human haulers in 2017 alone, a figure independently cited by both a Prothom Alo investigation and a later TreeBangladesh analysis. The same ARI research programme, covering a longer 2017–2019 window, has separately been cited as recording 16 deaths and 73 injuries across 32 accidents—a discrepancy that likely reflects differences in geographic scope or methodology between reports rather than a single consistent count. The Passenger Welfare Association of Bangladesh, a road-safety advocacy body, has generally reported substantially higher accident totals than ARI for the same years—276 accidents in 2017 and 469 in 2022—reflecting a broader definition of what counts as a reportable incident. Overtaking between competing drivers has been repeatedly identified by researchers as a leading contributing factor in leguna accidents. Fatal collisions have continued to be reported regularly in the Bangladeshi press through 2026, including a head-on crash between a bus and a leguna on the Chattogram–Cox's Bazar highway that killed three people and injured ten in May of that year.

=== Legal status and enforcement ===
Human haulers operate almost entirely without the paperwork the law formally requires: transport officials and researchers agree that the great majority lack a valid fitness certificate and that most drivers hold no driving licence. Bangladesh's High Court has intervened repeatedly, imposing a partial ban on human haulers and related vehicles in ten districts in 2014 and a full ban on their use on national highways in January 2017, while Dhaka's Metropolitan Police separately announced in September 2018 that the vehicles would be barred from the capital's main roads altogether, permitted only on feeder roads and in outlying areas.

None of these measures has proven durable in practice. A former BRTA director acknowledged that enforcement drives against leguna operation tend to end with the vehicles going back to the roads after a period of disruption, and reporting from highway corridors across the country has repeatedly found human haulers and related vehicles operating in open defiance of the court's highway ban years after it was issued. Regulators have also struggled to coordinate: BRTA officials said in 2018 that they had not been consulted before the Dhaka police commissioner's public announcement of a fresh ban, and route permits allowing legunas onto stretches of highway have reportedly continued to be issued even after the High Court order took effect. In an added irony noted by transport worker representatives, police stations themselves have been reported to routinely requisition human haulers to transport detainees, even as police enforce bans on the same vehicles elsewhere.

=== Related vehicles ===
Legunas belong to a wider family of Bangladeshi improvised passenger vehicles that emerged to cover gaps in formal transport — a family that also includes the three-wheeled, shallow-engine nosimon and korimon common in rural areas, as well as battery-powered "easy bikes" and modified "Mahindra" jeeps. All have faced broadly similar cycles of proliferation, high-profile accidents, and court-ordered but loosely enforced bans since the mid-2010s.

=== Accessibility concerns ===
Beyond safety and legality, researchers studying transport access in Dhaka have identified the leguna's cramped bench seating and boarding arrangement as a specific barrier for older adults and people with mobility impairments. A 2024 academic study of transport-related social exclusion found that older adults reported avoiding the vehicle, citing both the physical difficulty of boarding and negative social attitudes encountered on board.

== Current status ==
Despite more than a decade of court orders, police bans, and permit freezes, human haulers remain a visible and heavily used part of Bangladesh's urban and peri-urban transport mix as of 2026, particularly in industrial and outlying areas of greater Dhaka, such as Ashulia and Savar, that remain poorly served by formal bus routes. Transport researchers and newspaper editorials have periodically called for a more structured response — ranging from dedicated slow-vehicle lanes on highways to a phased, planned replacement of the vehicles with safer alternatives — rather than the recurring cycle of announcement and quiet non-enforcement that has characterised leguna policy to date.
