= Dhaka Bypass Expressway =

Road in Dhaka, Bangladesh

N105
- Dhaka Bypass Expressway

Route information
- Part of AH41
- Maintained by Roads and Highways Department
- Length: 48 km (30 mi)

Major junctions
- North end: Kodda, Basan Thana, Gazipur District
- South end: Madanpur, Bandar Upazila, Narayanganj District

Location
- Country: Bangladesh
- Major cities: Dhaka

Highway system
- Roads in Bangladesh
← N4	→ N1

Dhaka Bypass Expressway is a 48 km (30 mi) under construction controlled-access highway located in the division of Dhaka in Bangladesh. The project constitutes a segment of the Asian Highway network. Its principal objective is to alleviate heavy traffic congestion on access roads and highways passing through the city of Dhaka.

== Background ==
Before the construction of the expressway, the two-lane road here was known as the Dhaka Bypass Road. According to varying reports from The Daily Star, construction of the road began either in 1997, November 2001, or January 2002, with an estimated cost of ৳283 crore (US$23 million) to ৳317 crore (US$26 million), The opening date was December 2005. A bridge, measuring either 415 metres or 445 metres, was also being constructed at Kanchan. The route starts at Joydebpur and stretches to the N1 (Dhaka–Chittagong highway) at Madanpur, connecting the N2 (Dhaka–Sylhet highway). The government had long had numerous discussions regarding its potential conversion of this road into an expressway.

In September 2012, the conversion project named 'Support to Joydebpur–Debgram–Bhulta–Madanpur Road' was approved by the government to upgrade the road into a four-lane expressway with a service lane. In 2016, the Executive Committee of the National Economic Council gave approval for implementation of preparatory works related to the project. While initially the government took the initiative to construct a 45 km elevated highway on this road at a cost of ৳2,821 crore, the plan was shelved due to complications and disputes among government agencies.

On 6 December 2018, the government signed a public-private partnership agreement with Sichuan Road and Bridge Group, Shamim Enterprise, and UDC Construction Limited to implement the project to convert the road into an expressway. According to the agreement, it was initially agreed that this four-lane expressway will be constructed at a cost of ৳3,500 crore. The share of the government was ৳230 crore. Under the construction project, there were plans to construct overpasses, underpasses and bridges at various places on the expressway. Asian Development Bank is responsible for financial consultancy of this project.

However, the project deadline of June 2020 has passed for land acquisition and financing work. Therefore, the project implementation period had been extended by another 4 years. Also, the government has increased its share in the project budget to ৳674.34 crore. On 22 June 2021, Executive Committee of the National Economic Council approved the project again after revision.

On 24 April 2022, Bangladesh Infrastructure Finance Fund Limited and China Development Bank announced a loan assistance of ৳1,075 crore and ৳1,614 crore respectively to the Dhaka Bypass Expressway Development Company Limited for the construction of the expressway. The government was set to provide ৳224 crore as viability gap financing. The company was jointly formed by Sichuan Road and Bridge Group, Shamim Enterprises, and UDC Construction Limited, and has been given the opportunity to collect tolls for 23 years after the time of establishment of the expressway.

== Construction ==
Its construction started on 26 December 2019. After April 2022, the construction of the expressway was speeded up due to the loan assistance of Bangladesh Infrastructure Finance Fund Limited and China Development Bank. As of 2023, the project is experiencing delays due to land transfer issues from government agencies, hampering its progress.

On 24 August 2025, an 18 km section of the Dhaka Bypass Expressway was opened to traffic. It was officially inaugurated by Muhammad Fouzul Kabir Khan, Adviser of Road Transport and Bridges.

== See also ==
- Dhaka Elevated Expressway
- Dhaka–Bhanga Expressway
- Purbachal Expressway
