= Kuril Flyover =

Flyover in Bangladesh

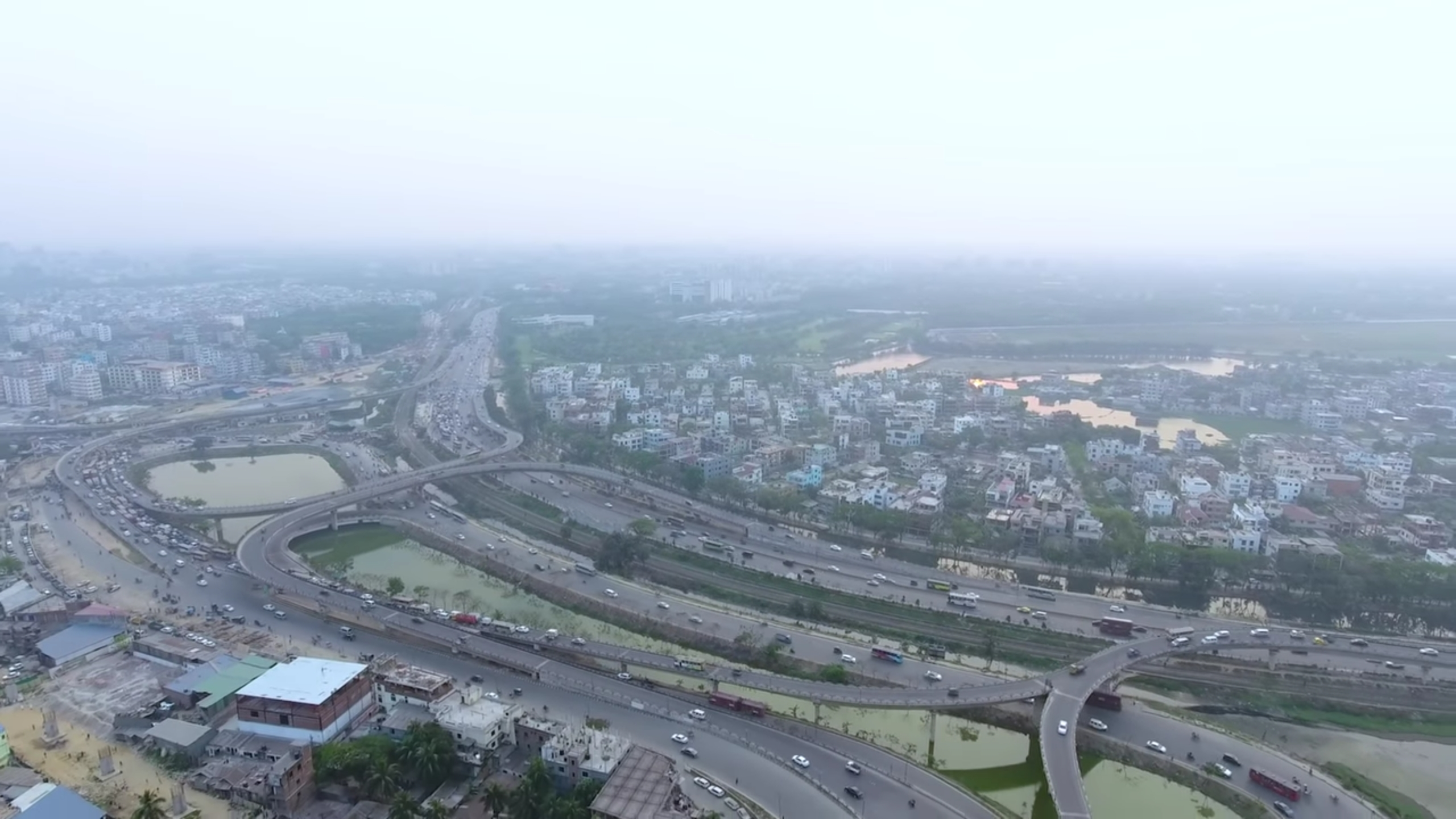
- Kuril Flyover drone view
- Coordinates: 23.8223°N 90.4206°E
- Locale: Dhaka

Characteristics
- Total length: 3.1 km

History
- Constructed by: Project Builders Limited, China Major Bridge Engineering Corporation
- Construction start: 2 May 2010
- Construction end: 4 August 2013
- Construction cost: 3.06 billion taka

Location
- Interactive map of Kuril Flyover

The Kuril Flyover is the third largest flyover in Bangladesh. It is located in Dhaka. Its foundation stone was laid on 2 May 2010. Finally the work started in March 2011.

The flyover was opened for traffic on 4 August 2013.

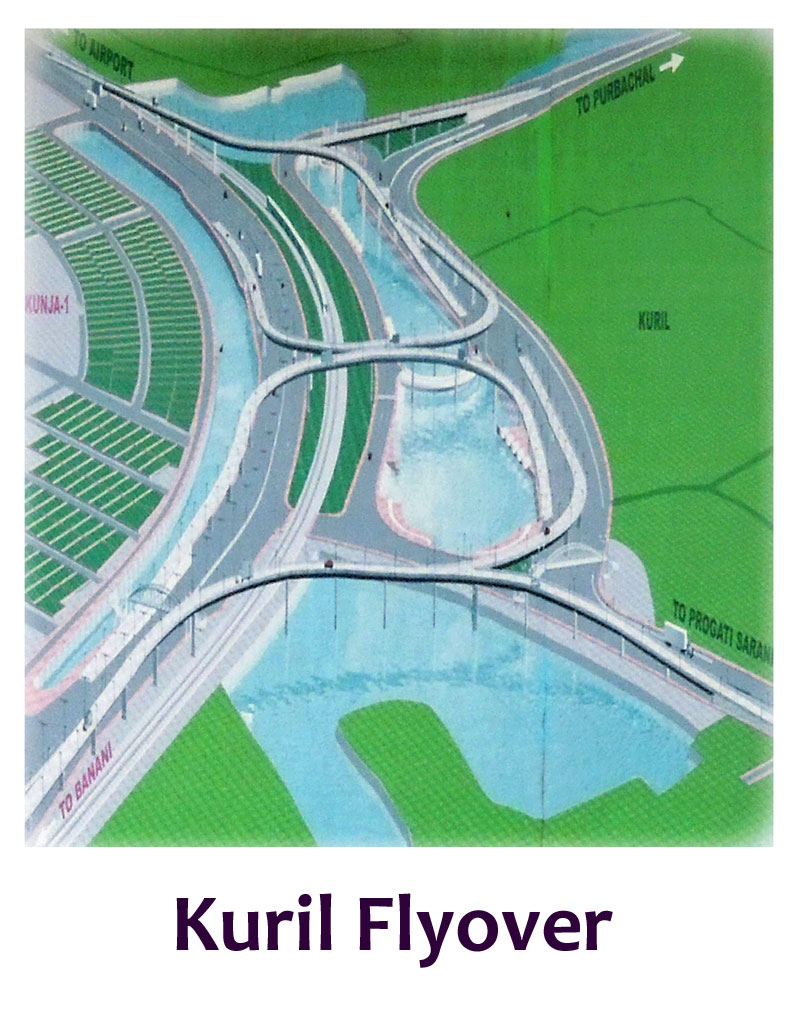
Kuril Flyover
