= Purbachal Expressway =

Expressway in Bangladesh

N301
- 300 feet road Purbachal link road
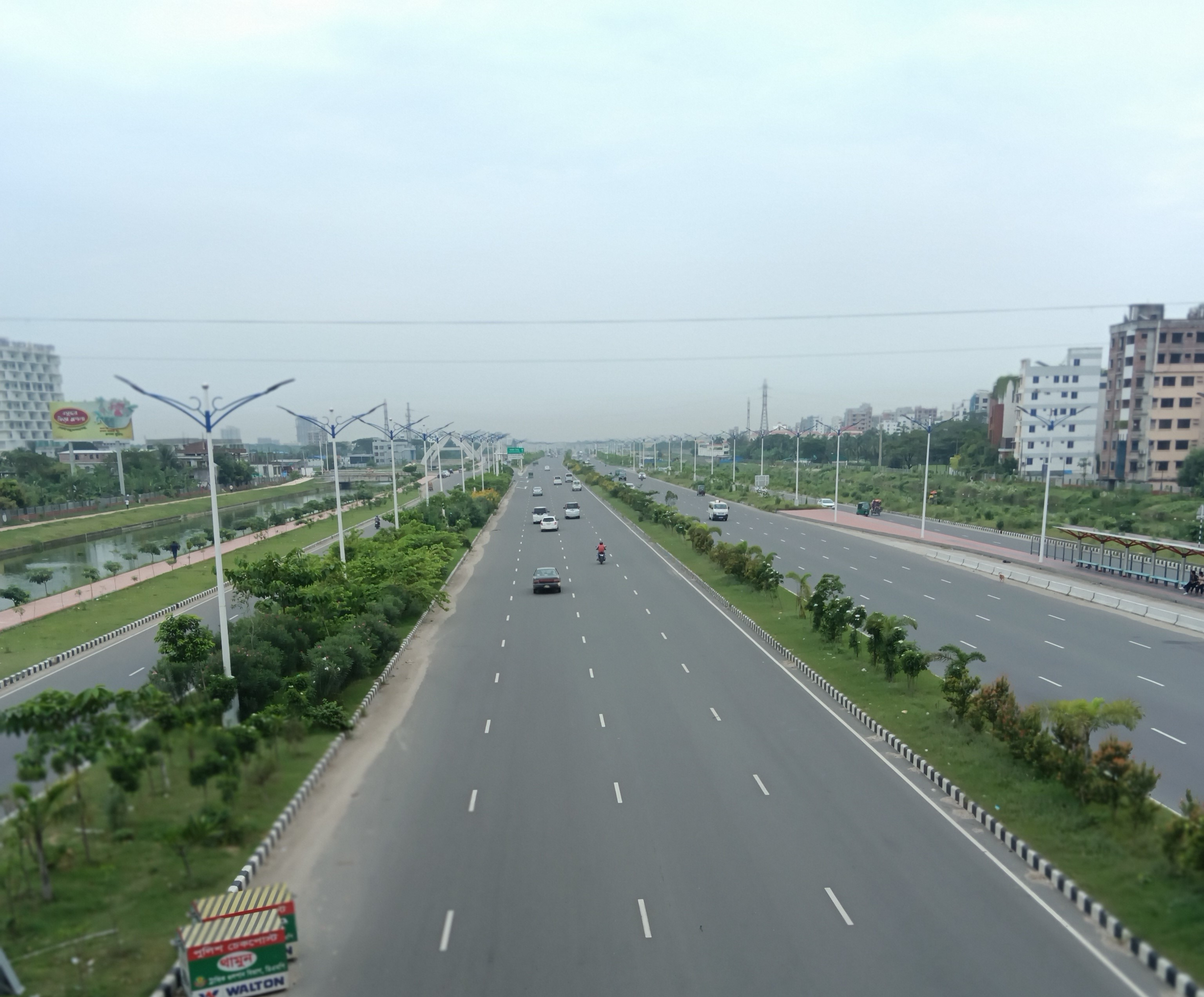

Route information
- Maintained by Bangladesh Road Transport Authority
- Length: 12.5 km (7.8 mi)

Major junctions
- West end: Kuril Flyover, Khilkhet Thana
- East end: Kanchan Bridge, Rupganj Upazila

Location
- Country: Bangladesh
- Major cities: Dhaka

Highway system
- Roads in Bangladesh
← N3	→ N105

Purbachal Expressway (Bengali: পূর্বাচল এক্সপ্রেসওয়ে), officially July 36 Expressway (Bengali: জুলাই ৩৬ এক্সপ্রেসওয়ে) and nicknamed as "300-feet" Road/Expressway, due to initial planned width, is a 12.5-kilometre-long (7.8 mi), 14 lane expressway in Dhaka, Bangladesh. This expressway connects Purbachal to northeastern Dhaka.

== History ==
In 2005, a proposal involving development for project of Purbachal was passed. In that proposal an eight-lane expressway was mentioned. But Rajdhani Unnayan Kartripakkha (RAJUK) started the expressway project with a four-lane road in 2013 because of fund shortage. RAJUK built the link road with Tk 300 crore. In 2015 Detailed Area Plan passed by the Executive Committee of the National Economic Council. In the new plan a road with 100-foot canal on the both side of road was added. For this road project a budget of Tk 5,287 crore was mentioned. After completing the existing project, To expand the road into 8-lane expressway, government had to reshape the project in November 2018. The budget for the project was revised to Tk 10,330 crore. For the revision and canal the 300 feet road would be built as 235 feet. It had been decided to reconstruct the expressway by Bangladesh Army instead of RAJUK. The expressway was inaugurated by Sheikh Hasina on 14 November 2023 from her official residence at Ganabhaban, Sher-e-Bangla Nagar.

== Specifications ==
Under the project, canals, walkways, U-loops, multiple bridges for crossing the canal, multiple foot overbridges for expressway crossing, sluice gates, water bus stops and sewer lines were constructed for the expressway.

== Connectivity ==
An expressway under construction named Dhaka Bypass Expressway will connect Gazipur and Narayanganj district through Purbachal Expressway. Seven stations of MRT Line 1 will be built on the expressway. The proposed two link roads will connect the expressway with Madani Avenue.

== Issue ==
MRT Line 1 will have seven stations on the expressway, which will be on elevated line. Before construction began, it was known that the expressway might be damaged during the construction of the stations. MM Ehsan Jamil, director of the expressway construction project, claimed that he had asked the metro authority to construct seven stations in the Purbachal section underground. But it became impossible as the construction contract with JICA was done before that. Therefore, he suggested to start the work on the eastern part of MRT Line 1 with the construction of the expressway earlier to avoid damage to the expressway, but it could not be done due to various issues. Later, 4 meters space was left in the median strip of the expressway for the construction of the metro. Later the secretary of Road Transport and Highways Division assured that the construction of the line would be done in a coordinated manner so as not to cause major damage to the expressway. He also informed that the pillar of the line will be built on the median strip and the two columns of the station will be built on the green space on both sides of the expressway so that no space on the road will be used.
