= Balu River =

Coordinates: 23°49′51″N 90°29′11″E

Kalu River
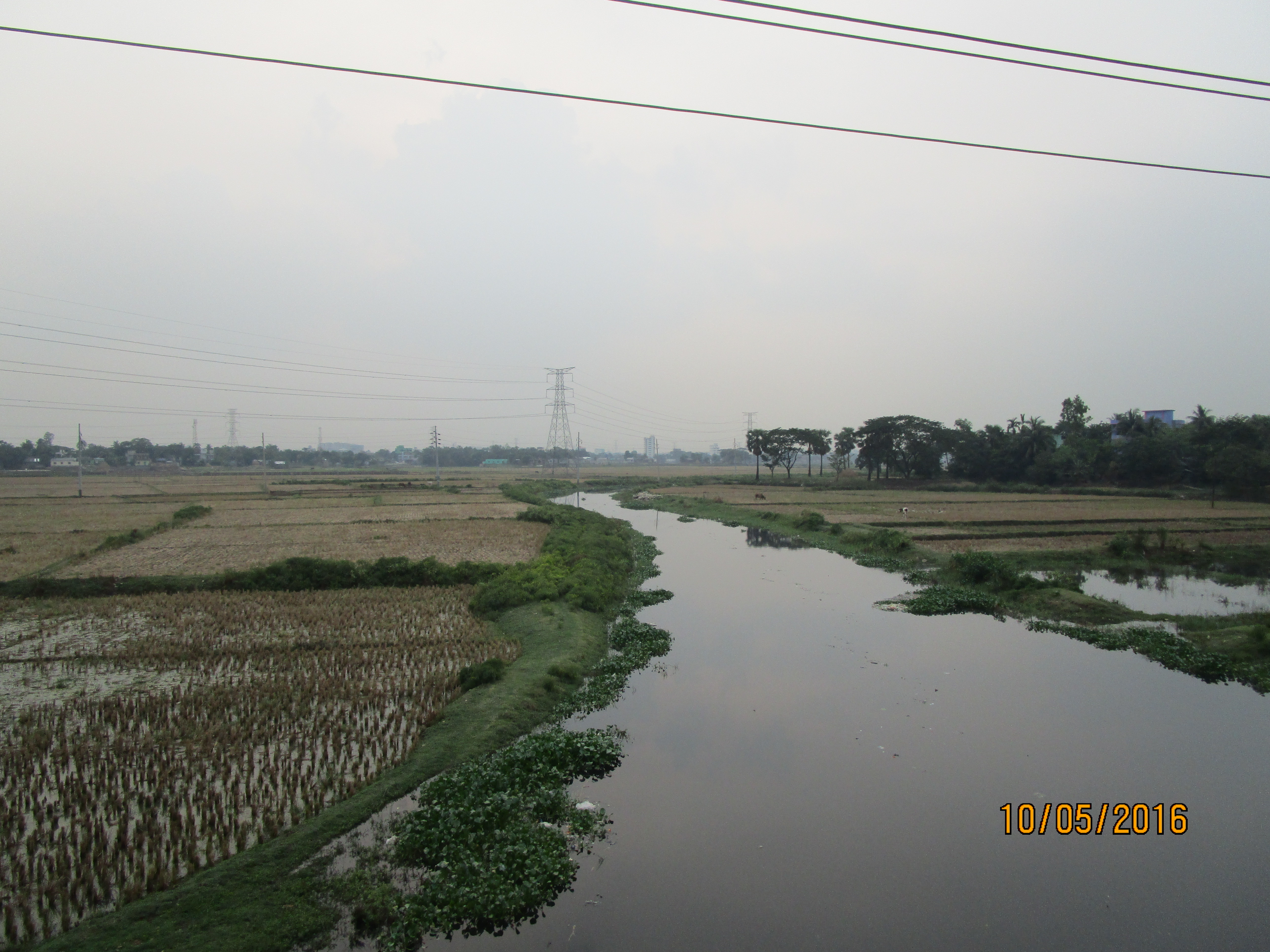
- Balu River, near Tongi Junction railway station
- Native name: বালু নদী (Bengali)

Location
- Country: Bangladesh
- Division: Dhaka
- Cities: Gazipur; Dhaka; Narayanganj

Physical characteristics
- Source: Paruli River Sutia River
- Mouth: Shitalakshya River
- Length: 44 km (27 mi)

The Balu River, located in Bangladesh, is a tributary of the Shitalakshya River. The 44-km long Balu passes through the wetlands of Beel Belai and Dhaka before its confluence with the Shitalakshya at Demra.
