= List of bridges in Bangladesh =

This is a list of bridges in Bangladesh.

== Historical or architectural interest bridges ==
Photo		Name	Bengali	Distinction	Length	Type	Carries Crosses	Opened	Location	Division	Ref.
	1	Pugla Bridge in ruins	পাগলা পুল	Mughal era bridge Protected monument		Masonry; 3 four centered bricks arches	Pagla River	1663	Dhaka; 23°39′44.5″N 90°27′19.3″E	Dhaka	(Note: Also called Pagla Bridge.)
	2	Mirkadim Bridge	মীরকাদিম ব্রিজ	Mughal era bridge Protected monument	53 m (174 ft)	Masonry; 3 four centered bricks arches	Mirkadim–Abdullahpur Road; Mir Kadim Canal	17th century	Mirkadim; 23°32′53.1″N 90°28′38.1″E	Dhaka	
	3	Bariura Old Bridge in ruins	বাড়িউড়া প্রাচীন পুল	Mughal era bridge Protected monument		Masonry; 1 four centered bricks arch		17th century	Sarail Upazila; 24°03′15.1″N 91°09′04.0″E	Chittagong	(Note: Also called Hatirpool or Sarail Bridge.)
	4	Panam Bridge	পানাম সেতু	Protected monument	26 m (85 ft)	Masonry; 3 bricks arches	Sonargaon Road; Pankhiraz Canal	18th century	Sonargaon; 23°39′23.3″N 90°36′07.5″E	Dhaka	(Note: Also called Dallalpur Pul or Dalalpur Bridge.)
	5	Kalurghat Bridge	কালুরঘাট সেতু	Protected monument	604 m (1,982 ft)	Truss; Steel; Railroad bridge	National Highway 107; Railway bridge Karnaphuli	1931	Chittagong; 22°23′45.1″N 91°53′20.2″E	Chittagong	
	6	Keane Bridge	কীন ব্রীজ	Protected monument	350 m (1,150 ft)	Truss; Steel	National Highway 2 Surma	1936	Sylhet; 24°53′15.2″N 91°52′04.8″E	Sylhet	

== Major bridges ==
This table presents a non-exhaustive list of the road and railway bridges with spans greater than 100 metres (328 ft) or total lengths longer than 900 metres (2,953 ft).

Photo		Name	Bengali	Span	Length	Structural type	Carries Crosses	Opened	Location	Division	Ref.
	1	Shah Amanat Bridge	তৃতীয় কর্ণফুলী সেতু	200 m (660 ft)(x3)	950 m (3,120 ft)	Extradosed; Concrete box girder deck, 4 concrete pylons 115+3x200+115	National Highway 1 Karnaphuli	2010	Chittagong; 22°19′29.9″N 91°51′11.1″E	Chittagong	(Note: Also called Third Karnaphuli Bridge.)
	2	Payra Bridge	পায়রা সেতু	200 m (660 ft)(x2)	1,470 m (4,820 ft)	Extradosed; Concrete box girder deck, 3 concrete pylons 115+2x200+115	National Highway 8 Burishwar River	2021	Barishal–Patuakhali; 22°27′55.5″N 90°20′27.9″E	Barishal	(Note: Also called Lebukhali Bridge.)
	3	Padma Bridge	পদ্মা সেতু	150 m (490 ft)(x41)	6,150 m (20,180 ft)	Truss; Composite steel/concrete deck 41x150	National Highway 8 Padma River	2022	Munshiganj District–Shariatpur District; 23°27′45.4″N 90°15′46.2″E	Dhaka	
	4	Shah Amanat Old Bridge demolished		145 m (476 ft)	919 m (3,015 ft)	Truss; Steel	Karnaphuli	1989	Chittagong; 22°19′29.5″N 91°51′08.7″E	Chittagong	
	5	Lamakazi Bridge	এম এ খান সেতু	122 m (400 ft)	226 m (741 ft)	Truss; Steel	Road bridge R280; Surma River	1984	Sylhet; 24°54′35.2″N 91°44′04.6″E	Sylhet	
	6	8th Bangladesh-China Friendship Bridge	৮ম বাংলাদেশ-চীন মৈত্রী সেতু	122(x7)	1,493 m (4,898 ft)	Box girder Prestressed concrete 72+7x122+72	Road bridge N807; Kocha River	2022	Pirojpur; 22°34′29.9″N 90°01′47.1″E	Barishal	(Note: Also called Bekutia Bridge.)
	7	Sadipur Bridge		120 m (390 ft)	163 m (535 ft)	Truss; Steel	National Highway 2 Kushiyara River	2000	Sadipur; 24°38′33.8″N 91°41′29.3″E	Sylhet	
	8	Gabkhan Bridge	গাবখান সেতু	116 m (381 ft)	918 m (3,012 ft)	Box girder Prestressed concrete	Road bridge R870; Gabkhan Channel	2002	Sunamganj; 22°38′28.4″N 90°10′44.2″E	Barishal	(Note: Also called 5th Bangladesh-China Friendship Bridge.)
	9	Abduj Zohur Bridge	আব্দুজ জহুর সেতু	115 m (377 ft)	403 m (1,322 ft)	Truss; Steel	Road bridge Z2804; Surma River	2015	Sunamganj; 25°03′15.8″N 91°23′07.1″E	Sylhet	
	10	Lalon Shah Bridge	লালন শাহ সেতু	110 m (360 ft)(x15)	1,786 m (5,860 ft)	Box girder Prestressed concrete 72+15x110+72	National Highway 704; Padma River	2004	Pabna–Kushtia; 24°03′54.6″N 89°01′46.4″E	Rajshahi; Khulna	
	11	Sayed Nazrul Islam Bridge	ভৈরব সেতু	110 m (360 ft)(x7)	1,194 m (3,917 ft)	Box girder Prestressed concrete 79+7x110+79	National Highway 2 Meghna River	2002	Bhairab Upazila–Ashuganj; 24°02′41.2″N 90°59′44.8″E	Dhaka; Chittagong	(Note: Also called Bangladesh-UK Friendship Bridge.)
	12	Hardinge Bridge	হার্ডিঞ্জ ব্রিজ	105 m (344 ft)(x15)	1,810 m (5,940 ft)	Truss; Steel; 15x105	Chilahati–Parbatipur–Santahar–Darshana line Padma River	1912	Bheramara Upazila–Ishwardi Upazila; 24°04′03.8″N 89°01′45.3″E	Khulna; Rajshahi	
	13	Second Bhairab Railway Bridge		102 m (335 ft)(x9)	984 m (3,228 ft)	Truss; Steel; 9x102	Tongi–Bhairab–Akhaura line Meghna River	2017	Bhairab Upazila–Ashuganj; 24°02′38.1″N 90°59′40.8″E	Dhaka; Chittagong	
	14	Rupsha Rail Bridge	রূপসা রেল সেতু	102 m (335 ft)(x7)	5,130 m (16,830 ft)	Truss; Steel; 7x102	Khulna–Mongla Port line Rupsa River	2024	Batiaghata Upazila–Khulna; 22°45′51.4″N 89°34′43.9″E	Khulna	
	15	Khan Jahan Ali Bridge	খান জাহান আলী সেতু	100 m (330 ft)(x5)	1,360 m (4,460 ft)	Box girder Prestressed concrete 70+5x100+70	National Highway 709; Rupsa River	2005	Khulna; 22°46′40.1″N 89°35′1.7″E	Khulna	
	16	Mukterpur Bridge	মুক্তারপুর সেতু	100 m (330 ft)(x5)	1,521 m (4,990 ft)	Box girder Prestressed concrete	Road bridge R812; Dhaleshwari River	2008	Munshiganj District; 23°34′10.3″N 90°30′44.6″E	Dhaka	(Note: Also called Moktarpur Bridge or 6th Bangladesh-China Friendship Bridge.)
	17	Jamuna Railway Bridge	যমুনা রেল সেতু	100 m (330 ft)	4,800 m (15,700 ft)	Truss; Steel	Railway bridge Jamuna River	2025	Tangail–Sirajganj; 24°24′08.6″N 89°46′54.8″E	Dhaka; Rajshahi	
	18	Jamuna Bridge	যমুনা বহুমুখী সেতু	99 m (325 ft)(x47)	4,987 m (16,362 ft)	Box girder Prestressed concrete Railroad bridge 65+47x100+65	National Highway 405; Railway bridge Jamuna River	1998	Tangail–Sirajganj; 24°23′58.7″N 89°46′54.9″E	Dhaka; Rajshahi	(Note: Also called Jamuna Multi-purpose Bridge.)
	19	Bhairab Railway Bridge	ভৈরব রেলওয়ে সেতু	91 m (299 ft)	914 m (2,999 ft)	Truss; Steel; 7x91	Tongi–Bhairab–Akhaura line Meghna River	1937	Bhairab Upazila–Ashuganj; 24°02′39.0″N 90°59′41.7″E	Dhaka; Chittagong	(Note: Also called Anderson Bridge, Ashuganj Railway bridge, Shaheed Halim Railway Bridge, King George-VI Bridge.)
	20	Sultana Kamal Bridge	সুলতানা কামাল সেতু	90 m (300 ft)	1,072 m (3,517 ft)	Box girder Prestressed concrete	Road bridge R201; Shitalakshya River	2010	Dhaka–Tarabo; 23°43′18.5″N 90°30′01.3″E	Dhaka; Chittagong	
	21	Meghna Bridge	মেঘনা সেতু	87 m (285 ft)(x9)	930 m (3,050 ft)	Box girder Prestressed concrete 48+9x87+48	National Highway 1 Meghna River	1991	Narayanganj; 23°36′21.5″N 90°36′50.2″E	Dhaka	(Note: Also called 1st Bangladesh-Japan Friendship Bridge.)
	22	Meghna-Gumti Bridge	গোমতি সেতু	87 m (285 ft)(x15)	1,410 m (4,630 ft)	Box girder Prestressed concrete 52+15x87+52	National Highway 1 Meghna River; Gumti River	1994	Daudkandi Upazila; 23°31′48.9″N 90°42′08.0″E	Dhaka; Chittagong	
	23	Shaheed Abdur Rab Serniabat Bridge	শহীদ আব্দুর রব সেরনিয়াবাত সেতু	85 m (279 ft)	1,390 m (4,560 ft)	Box girder Prestressed concrete	National Highway 8 Kirtankhola River	2010	Barishal; 22°39′49.0″N 90°21′18.1″E	Barishal	(Note: Also called Dapdapia Bridge.)

== Alphabetical list ==
Name	Locality	Date	Notes
Asmat Ali Khan Bridge	Madaripur		Crosses Arial Khan River
Bangladesh-China Friendship Bridge or 1st Buriganga Bridge	Postogola, Dhaka	1989	Crosses Buriganga River
Babu Bazar Buriganga Bridge	Babu Bazar, Dhaka	2001	Crosses Buriganga River
Bangladesh-UK Friendship Bridge or Bhairab Bridge	Bhairab Upazila, Kishoreganj District	2002	Crosses Meghna River
Bekutia Bridge	Pirojpur District	2020	Crosses Katcha River
Bhairab Railway Bridge	Bhairab Upazila, Kishoreganj District	2017	Crosses Meghna River
Bir Srestho Mohiuddin Jahangir Bridge	Dehergoti, Barishal		Crosses Sandha River
Birulia Bridge	Birulia, Savar	2015	Crosses Turag River
Dopdopia Bridge	Barishal		Crosses Kirtankhola River
Elliott Bridge	Sirajganj		Crosses Katakhali River
Esladi Bridge	Barishal		Crosses Sikarpur River
Hardinge Bridge	Paksey	1912	Crosses Padma river
Jamuna Bridge	Bhuapur Upazila	1998	Crosses Jamuna River
Keane Bridge	Sylhet	1936	Crosses Surma River
Khan Jahan Ali Bridge or Rupsha Bridge	Khulna	2005	Crosses Rupsa River
Lalon Shah Bridge	Ishwardi Upazila/Bheramara Upazila	2004	Crosses Padma river
Marikhali Bridge	near Dhaka	2004	Crosses Meghna river
Meghna Bridge	near Dhaka	1991	Crosses Meghna river
Padma Bridge	Lohajang Upazila	2018	Crosses Padma river
Shah Amanat Bridge	Chittagong	2010	Crosses Karnaphuli River
Sheikh Jamal Bridge	Patuakhali	2016	Crosses Sonatola River, branch of Andharmanik River
Sheikh Kamal Bridge	Patuakhali	2016	Crosses Andharmanik River
Sheikh Russell Bridge	Patuakhali	2015	Crosses Shibbaria River
Kalurghat Bridge	Kalurghat, Chittagong	1930	Crosses Karnaphuli River
Lebukhali Bridge	Bakerganj, Barisal	2020	Crosses Payra River
Muktarpur Bridge	Connects Narayanganj & Munsiganj	2008	Crosses Dhaleshwari River
Sultana Kamal Bridge	Tarabo, Rupganj Upazila	2010	Crosses Shitalakshya River
Kanchon Bridge	Rupganj Upazila	2005	Crosses Shitalakshya River
Kanchpur Bridge	Kanchpur, Narayanganj	1977	Crosses Shitalakshya River
Daudkandi Gomoti Bridge	Daudkandi Upazila, Dhaka		Crosses Gomti River (Meghna River Branch)
Kazir Bazar Selfie Bridge	Sylhet	2015	Crosses Surma River
Hazrat Shah Poran Bridge or Sylhet Jaflong Bypass Bridge	Sylhet		Crosses Surma River
Admiral M A Khan Bridge	Sylhet		Crosses Surma River
Titas Bridge or Shahbazpur Bridge	Shahbazpur, Brahmanbaria		Crosses Titas River
Rupsha Rail Bridge	Khulna		Crosses Rupsha River
Shambhuganj Bridge	Mymensingh		Crosses Brahmaputra River
Nalka Bridge	Sirajganj		Crosses Pholjor River

== Flyovers and overpasses ==
Image	Name	Bengali	Length	Opened	Location	Division	Ref.
	Mohakhali Flyover	মহাখালী ফ্লাইওভার	1.12 km	2004	Dhaka	Dhaka	
	Khilgaon Flyover	খিলগাঁও ফ্লাইওভার	1.9 km	2005	Dhaka	Dhaka	
	Bijoy Sarani-Tejgaon Overpass	বিজয় সরনি-তেজগাঁও ওভারপাস	1.1 km	2010	Dhaka	Dhaka	
	Shahid Ahsanullah Master Flyover	শহীদ আহসানউল্লাহ মাস্টার ফ্লাইওভার		2010	Gazipur	Dhaka	
	Kuril Flyover	কুড়িল ফ্লাইওভার	3.1 km	2013	Dhaka	Dhaka	
	Mirpur-Airport Road Flyover	মিরপুর-এয়ারপোর্ট রোড ফ্লাইওভার	1.8 km	2013	Dhaka	Dhaka	
	Jatrabari-Gulistan Flyover	যাত্রাবাড়ী–গুলিস্তান ফ্লাইওভার	11.8 km	2013	Dhaka	Dhaka	
	Bahaddarhat Flyover	বহদ্দারহাট ফ্লাইওভার	1.39 km	2013	Chittagong	Chittagong	
	Mogbazar-Mouchak Flyover	মগবাজার-মৌচাক ফ্লাইওভার	8.7 km	2017	Dhaka	Dhaka	
	Akhtaruzzaman Flyover	আখতারুজ্জামান ফ্লাইওভার	6.8 km	2017	Chittagong	Chittagong	
	Bhulta Flyover	ভুলতা ফ্লাইওভার	1.23 km	2019	Narayanganj	Dhaka	
	Dhaka Metro Rail Line - 6	ঢাকা মেট্রোরেল লাইন-৬	21 km	2022	Dhaka	Dhaka	

== See also ==
- Transport in Bangladesh
- Rail transport in Bangladesh
- List of roads in Bangladesh
- Geography of Bangladesh
- List of rivers of Bangladesh
