= Marikhali Bridge =

Coordinates: 23.6339°N 90.5972°E

Marikhali Bridge is a pair of parallel prestressed concrete girder bridges in Bangladesh. It is located along the Dhaka-Chittagong Highway, about 3.2 kilometres (2 mi) north of the more famous Meghna Bridge. Below is the traffic on the bridge in 2004:

Vehicle	Truck	Bus	Light Vehicle	Motorcycle	Total
March 2004	5,487	4,545	1,423	812	12,282
