= Phultala Junction railway station =

Railway station in Khulna District, Bangladesh

Phultala Junction ফুলতলা জংশন

General information
- Location: Phultala Upazila, Khulna District; Bangladesh
- Coordinates: 22.9509°N 89.4746°E
- Elevation: 29 m (95 ft)
- System: Bangladesh Railway Junction station
- Lines: Khulna–Mongla Port line; Darshana–Jessore–Khulna line
- Platforms: 3
- Tracks: 5

Construction
- Structure type: Standard (on ground station)
- Parking: Yes
- Cycle facilities: Yes
- Accessible: Disabled access Computerized Ticketing Counters Luggage Checking System Food Plaza Kiosks WC Taxi Stand Public Transportation

Other information
- Status: Functioning

History
- Opened: 1884; 142 years ago
- Former names: Eastern Bengal Railway

Services
Preceding station	Bangladesh Railway	Following station
Bejerdanga towards Darshana Junction	Darshana–Jessore–Khulna	Daulatpur towards Khulna
Terminus	Khulna–Mongla Port	Mongla Terminus
Location

Phultala Junction railway station is a railway junction in Bangladesh, situated in the Phultala Upazila of Khulna District. It was originally part of the Eastern Bengal State Railway during the British Raj. Phultala Junction is the take off point for the Khulna–Mongla Port Railway.
