= Bekutia Bridge =

8th Bangladesh-China Friendship Bridge
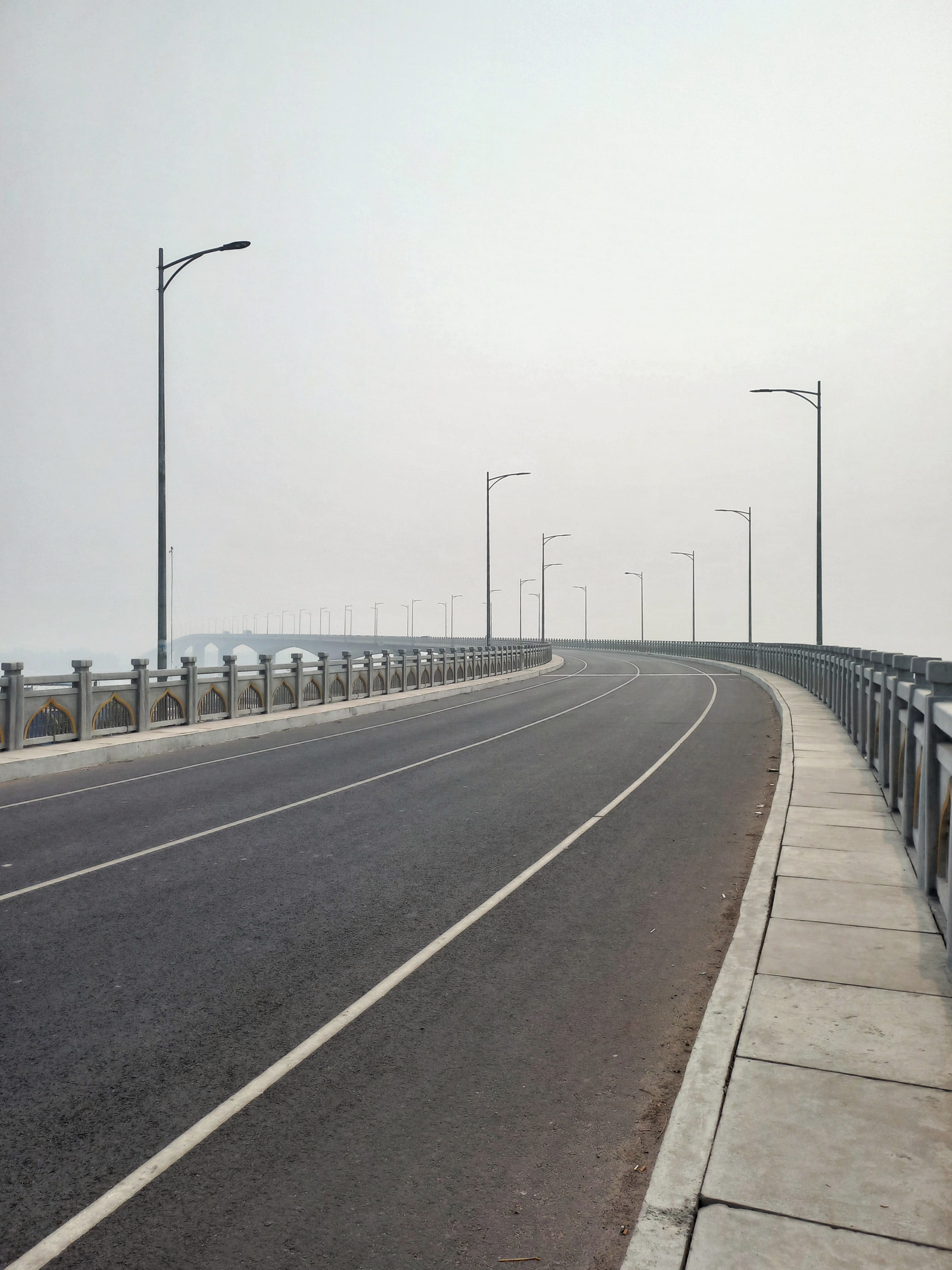
- Crosses: Kacha River
- Locale: Bekutia–Pirojpur, Barisal Division
- Official name: Bekutia Bridge
- Other name(s): 8th Bangladesh-China Friendship Bridge

Characteristics
- Design: Box girder bridge
- Total length: 1,493 metres (4,898 ft)
- Width: 10.25 metres (33.6 ft)

History
- Construction start: July 2018
- Construction end: September 2022
- Opened: 4 September 2022

Bekutia Bridge is a road bridge in Bangladesh, constructed over the Kacha River in Pirojpur District. The bridge was constructed with assistance from the Government of China. The total construction cost was Tk 8.98 billion, of which Tk 6.54 billion was provided as a grant by the Chinese government. The remaining Tk 2.44 billion was funded by the Government of Bangladesh. Including a 429-meter viaduct, the bridge has a total length of 1,493 meters and a width of 10.25 meters. The main bridge is 998 meters long. This box girder type bridge stands on 10 piers and 9 spans. Of the 9 spans, 7 are 122 meters long and 2 are 72 meters long. Construction began in July 2018. The bridge was inaugurated by then Prime Minister Sheikh Hasina on 4 September 2022.
