= Payra Bridge =

Road bridge in Bangladesh

Payra Bridge পায়রা সেতু
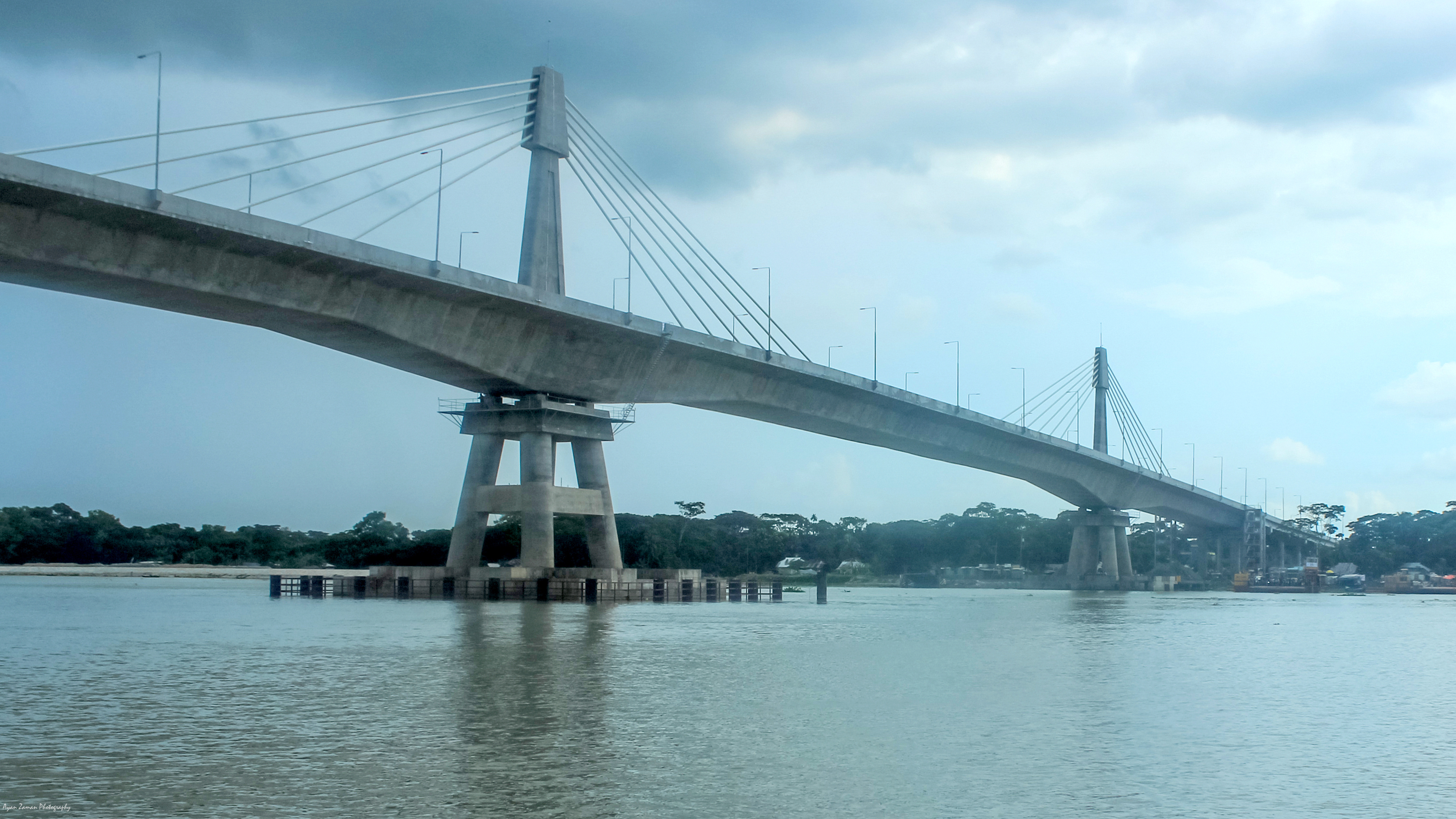
- Coordinates: 22.4641012°N 90.3412547°E
- Carries: National Highway 8
- Crosses: Payra River
- Locale: Patuakhali, Bangladesh
- Other name(s): Lebukhali Bridge

Characteristics
- Design: Extradosed bridge
- Material: Concrete, steel, rope
- Total length: 1,470 metres (4,820 ft)
- Width: 19.76 metres (64.8 ft)
- Height: 18.30 metres (60.0 ft)
- Longest span: 200 metres (660 ft)

History
- Construction start: July 24, 2016
- Construction end: October 2021
- Opened: October 28, 2021

Payra Bridge is a road bridge across the Burishwar River in Bangladesh. It connects Barisal and Patuakhali, linking the southwest of the country to the northern regions.

== History ==
A student from Patuakhali wrote a letter to Prime Minister Sheikh Hasina requesting to build a bridge over the river on which the bridge is located. After reading the letter, the Prime Minister assured to build the bridge. In 2012, the Department of Roads and Highways adopted a plan to build the Payra Bridge. At that time its construction cost was estimated at Tk 4.58 billion. The bridge is funded by Kuwait Fund for Arab Economic Development and OPEC Fund for International Development. On March 13, 2013, Sheikh Hasina laid the foundation stone of the bridge. Two years later, the budget for the bridge was doubled by revising the project. One year later, on July 24, the Longjian Road and Bridge Company was commissioned to build the bridge. In 2018, the construction work was delayed due to an error in the design of the bridge. However, in 2019, the final construction cost of the bridge was fixed at Tk 14.46 billion and the design of the bridge was changed. The four-lane bridge was scheduled to be completed in June 2020. But due to the COVID-19 epidemic, the work could not be completed on time. Later, the completion date was postponed to June 2022. The bridge was inaugurated on 28 October 2021.

== Specifications ==
Payra Bridge is one of the first bridges in Bangladesh to have a bridge health monitoring system. The length of the bridge is 1.48 km. The bridge has been constructed at a height of 18.3 meters above the water level to facilitate navigation. Not more than one pillar of this bridge has been placed in the river.

== Usage and benefits ==
Kuakata Beach is easily accessible from the bridge. Besides, this bridge connects Port of Payra with Dhaka.
