= Khulna–Mongla Port line =

Railway line in Bangladesh

Overview
- Status: Operational
- Owner: Bangladesh Railway
- Locale: Bangladesh
- Termini: Phultala Junction railway station; Mongla railway station
- Stations: 6

Service
- Type: Railway line

History
- Opened: 1 November 2023

Technical
- Line length: 65 km (40 mi)
- Track gauge: Broad-gauge 1,676 mm (5 ft 6 in)
- Operating speed: 80 km/h (50 mph)

Khulna–Mongla Port line is a 65-kilometre long (40 mi) broad gauge railway to connect the country with Mongla Port. The Rupsha Rail Bridge is located on this route.

== History ==
In 2010, the government planned to build a railway from Khulna to Mongla Port. A budget of ৳1,721 crore was fixed for the construction of this railway, a joint financing of India and Bangladesh. But in 2015 it increased to ৳3,802 crores. The deadline for the construction project was 2018. Due to the change in the route of the railway, the construction of a bridge over the Rupsa River became final and the length of the proposed railway increased from 53 km to 65 km. Two Indian contractors were appointed for the construction in 2015, but construction began the following year. As of November 2017, 27.5% of railway construction work was completed. The following year saw another 7.95% progress in construction. However, due to various complications, the railway could not be completed within three and a half years, due to which the deadline was proposed back to 2020. In 2019, Md. Nurul Islam Sujon, the railway minister of the country, announced that the railway line would be commissioned in 2022. On 25 June 2022, the construction work of the Rupsha Rail Bridge was completed. But in the same year, Bangladesh Railway sent a letter to the Ministry of Railways requesting to extend the duration of the project by two more years. In 2023, the construction budget was proposed to increase by another ৳459 crore. As of March 2023, the construction of the railway line was 96% complete. According to the project officials, the construction of the railway can be completed in July of the same year. This line was opened in 1 November 2023.

== Stations ==
- Phultala Junction railway station
- Aranghata railway station
- Mohammad Nagar railway station
- Katakhali railway station
- Chulkati railway station
- Bhaga railway station
- Digraj railway station
- Mongla railway station
