= Spectra Group =

- Formation: 1981
- Headquarters: Dhaka, Bangladesh
- Region served: Bangladesh
- Official language: Bengali
- Website: spectragroup.com.bd

Spectra Group (Bengali: স্পেকট্রা গ্রুপ) is a Bangladeshi diversified conglomerate based in Dhaka. Khan Md. Aftabuddin is the chairperson of Spectra Group. Khalid Hussain Khan is the managing director of the group.

== History ==
Spectra Group started as Reza Construction in 1981 which became Reza Construction Limited in 1989.

In 2000, the group founded Spectra Convention Centre.

Spectra Properties Limited was founded in 2005 and Spectra Hexa Feeds Limited was found in 2006.

Spectra Oxygen Limited was established in 2007 and Sunypun Organics Limited was established in 2008.

Reza Construction Limited changed its name to Spectra Engineers Limited in 2011. It also founded Palm View Restaurant & Green Point Cafe that year.

Spectra Marine Division was established in 2012.

In October 2015, Spectra Group became a partner in the construction of Bhulta flyover.

It jointly worked with Abdul Monem Limited for a portion of the N1 highway by Road Transport and Highways Division. The remaining portion went to Taher Brothers Limited.

In May 2021, the group launched a solar plant through its subsidiary Spectra Solar Park Limited in Shivalaya Upazila in Manikganj District. Spectra Solar Park Limited is jointly owned by Spectra and Shunfeng International Clean Energy Limited, a Chinese company. The plant would sell the generated electricity to Bangladesh Power Development Board.

During the COVID-19 pandemic in Bangladesh, Spectra Oxygen Limited had difficulties maintaining supplies of oxygen as consumers were stockpiling oxygen cylinders.

== Businesses ==
- Spectra- Hexa Namsai Limited
- Reza Construction Limited
- Spectra Engineers Limited
- Spectra Convention Centre
- Spectra Properties Limited
- Spectra Hexa Feeds Limited
- Spectra Oxygen Limited
- Sunypun Organics Limited
- Reza Construction Limited
- Palm View Restaurant & Green Point Cafe
- Spectra Marine Division
- Spectra International Limited
- Spectra Dye-Chem Private Limited
- German Euro Chemicals Limited
- Tex Chem International
- Spectra Solar Park Limited
