= Rupsha Rail Bridge =

Rupsha Railway Bridge রুপসা রেল সেতু
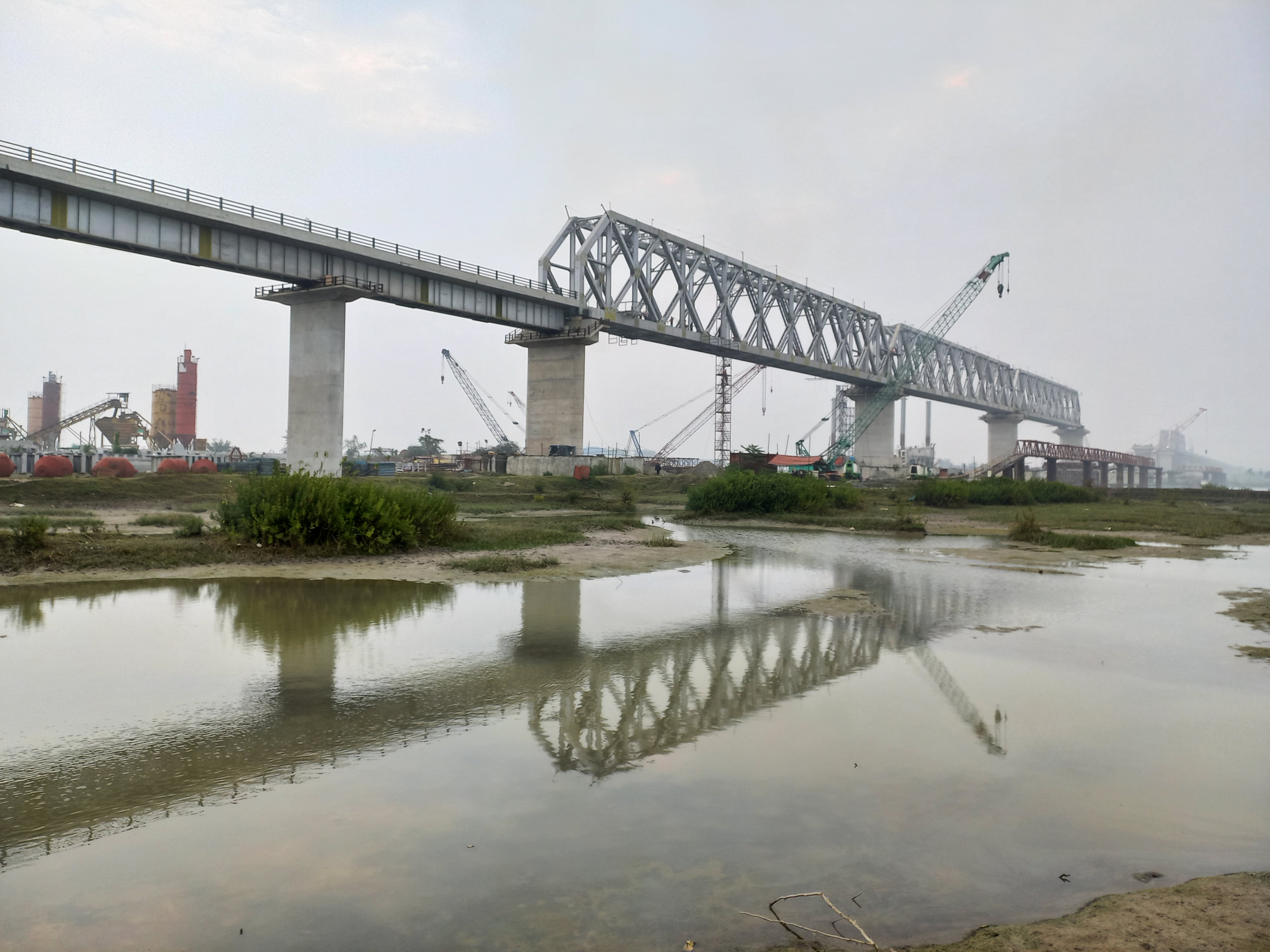
- Rupsha Railway Bridge
- Coordinates: 22.76411785614008°N 89.57900167833702°E
- Carries: Broad-Gauge Rail-line
- Crosses: Rupsha River
- Locale: Labanchara- Khulna Metro Area & Khanrabad, Batiaghata Upazila, Khulna District, Bangladesh
- Owner: Bangladesh Railway
- Next upstream: Khan Jahan Ali Bridge

Characteristics
- Total length: 5.13 kilometres (3 mi)

History
- Opened: June 2023

Rupsha Railway Bridge is a railway bridge on Rupsha River in Khulna District, Bangladesh. This bridge connects Khulna with Port of Mongla by railway network. Bangladesh Railway and Indian Larsen & Toubro Limited signed an agreement to construct the 5.13-kilometre (3.19 mi) long bridge.

== Project details ==
Khulna-Mongla Railway Project was passed by ECNEC on 21 December 2010. This project is divided into three parts. First one is to construct the railway, second one is to build a bridge over Rupsha and third one is to construct the signaling system. Estimated cost of this project is 1,076.445 crore taka. The bridge has 7 nos. of 102.4m long Double Warren Open-web Truss Girders with 136 nos. of 32.2 m long Composite Plate Girders for Viaducts on either side. This project will be finished in 2024. STUP Consultants P Limited of India is the Engineering Consultants for Design and Construction Supervision Services. STUP Consultants got associated with this Project since 1 January 2018. The construction work of the bridge was completed on 25 June 2022.

== Features ==
- Height: 16 metres (52 ft) from the land level.
- Number of Spans: 136 nos. of 32.2 m long Steel Composite Plate Girders on Viaduct on both end with 7 nos. of 102.4 m long Double Warren Type Truss Girders for the main bridge.
- Number of Piles: 1.0 m Dia 836 nos. of Piles for Viaducts and 2.5 m Dia 72 nos. of Piles for the main bridge and Fenders. Average length of 2.5 m dia pile for main bridge is about 65 m
- Number of Piers & Pier Caps: 136 + 8 = 144.
