= Bhairab River =

River in Bangladesh

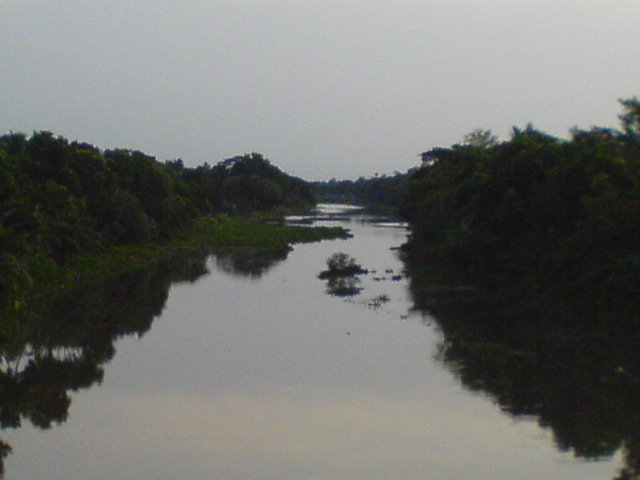
- The Bhairab in Jessore

Location
- Country: Bangladesh
- Division: Khulna
- Districts: Chuadanga; Jhenidah; Jessore; Narail; Khulna

Physical characteristics
- Source: Kapotaksha River
- Mouth: Rupsha River
- Length: 242 km (150 mi)

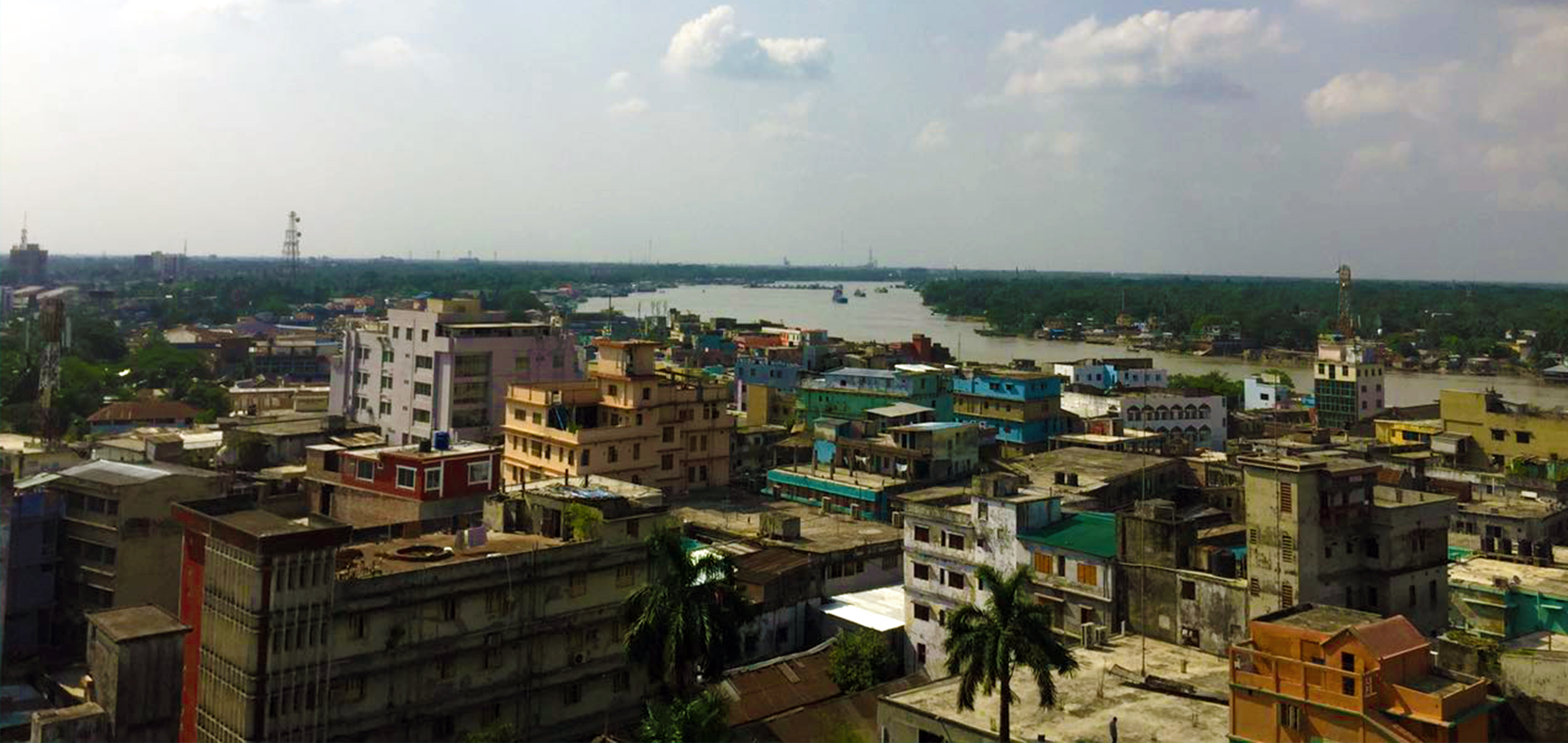
River Bhairab from Khulna City

The Bhairab (Bengali: ভৈরব নদী) is a river in south-western Bangladesh, a distributary of the Ganges. It passes through Khulna, dividing the city into two parts. Bhairab River originates from Tengamari border of Meherpur District and passes through Jessore city. The river is near about 160 kilometres (100 mi) long and 91 metres (300 ft) wide. Its average depth is 1.2 to 1.5 metres (4 to 5 ft) and with minimal water flow, it has plenty of silt.

== Early history ==
The Bhairab, which is considered to be of older origin than its parent river the Jalangi, takes off from that river a few miles north of Karimpur near Akheriganj at Bhagwangola (Vidhan Sabha constituency) in Murshidabad district (in West Bengal). After a tortuous course towards the south, it turns to the east forming the boundary between Meherpur P.S. (Bangladesh) and Karimpur (India) for a little distance. It then turns south, flowing past Meherpur town to the south and loses itself in the Mathabhanga close to the east of Kapashdanga. Its intake from the Jalangi having silted up, this river has been practically dead since long. The poor climate of Meherpur, which lies along its banks, is in great measure attributed to the stagnancy of its water.

== Geography ==
Bhairab River has two main branches, the Khulna-Ichamati and the Kobadak. The Khulna-Ichamati forms part of the border between Bangladesh and India. The towns of Khulna and Jessore are situated on the bank of the river. The development of their settlements and culture were influenced by the river. The Rupsa River is formed from the Bhairab and the Atrai River, and flows into the Pasur River.
