= Kacha (river) =

River in Krasnoyarsk Krai, Russia

Kacha Кача
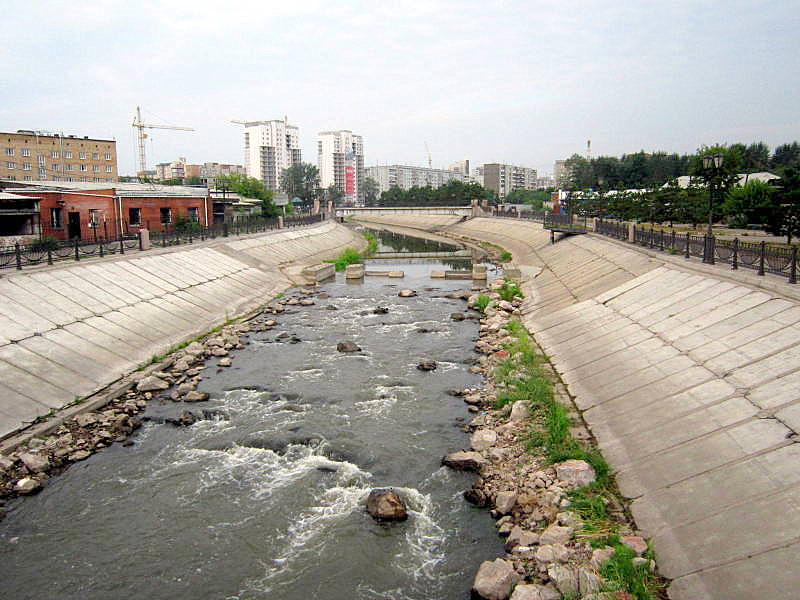
- View of the Kacha in Krasnoyarsk

- Mouth location in Krasnoyarsk Krai, Russia

Location
- Country: Krasnoyarsk Krai, Russia

Physical characteristics
- Source
  - location: Eastern Sayan
  - elevation: ca 581 m (1,906 ft)
- Mouth: Yenisey
  - coordinates: 56°00′55″N 92°53′58″E
  - elevation: 139 m (456 ft)
- Length: 102 km (63 mi)
- Basin size: 1,280 km^{2} (490 sq mi)

Basin features
- Progression: Yenisey→ Kara Sea

The Kacha (Russian: Ка́ча) is a river in Krasnoyarsk Krai, Russia. It is a right tributary of the Yenisey. The Turkic name of the river is Izyr-Su, and it has been suggested that the Russian name is derived from Izyr-Kichi "Izyr people", the self-name of the Turkic people that inhabited the river valley and adjacent lands.

== Course ==
The length of the Kacha is 102 kilometers (63 mi); the area of its drainage basin is 1,280 square kilometers (490 sq mi). It has two sources, the Gladkaya Kacha ("Smooth Kacha") and Krutaya Kacha ("Steep Kacha"), both located in the low mountainous range about 35 kilometers (22 mi) west of Krasnoyarsk. The Gladkaya Kacha is twice as long as the Krutaya Kacha; it starts in the middle mountainous area and has a deeper valley, while the Krutaya Kacha starts in the relatively flat and boggy area. Both streams flow from the range northward, cross the Trans-Siberian Railway, and join. Then the river turns eastward near the settlement of Pamyati 13 Bortsov and completes the half loop by turning back southwards to the Yenisey. The Kacha approaches Krasnoyarsk from the north and goes straight through the city, joining the Yenisey in the historical center of the city, Strelka.

== Ecology ==
Kacha has been long known for being the most polluted river of the Krasnoyarsk area, and only in the middle of the 2000s was the situation improved, at least in the Krasnoyarsk section of the river. The most serious pollution sources were several unfiltered sewage pipes and numerous solid wastes on the river banks. Currently, due to the administrative work of the mayor Pyotr Pimashkov, most of the sources were removed and the river banks in the city center have been turned into an attractive recreational area.

== See also ==
- List of rivers of Russia
