= Sultana Kamal Bridge =

- Coordinates: 23.721801°N 90.500427°E
- Carries: Vehicles
- Crosses: Shitalakshya River
- Locale: Tarabo, Rupganj, Narayanganj
- Begins: Demra Ghat
- Ends: Tarab Bazar
- Other name(s): Demra Bridge
- Maintained by: Roads and Highways Department

Characteristics
- Total length: 1.072 kilometres (0.666 mi)
- Width: 10 metres (33 ft)
- No. of lanes: 2

History
- Construction start: 2006
- Opened: 2010

Sultana Kamal Bridge also known as the Demra Bridge is a road bridge constructed over the Shitalakshya River in Tarabo, Narayanganj District, Bangladesh. The bridge connects the Tarabo town with the Demra Thana area in Dhaka District. Its construction has facilitated the expansion of Dhaka city toward the east. The bridge sees significant traffic from Narsingdi and the greater Sylhet region.

== History ==
Construction of the bridge began in 2006 and it was opened to the public in June 2010. It was inaugurated by former Prime Minister Sheikh Hasina. The bridge was one of three constructed under a single project. The construction cost was estimated at ৳798,800,000 (alternate source: ৳760,000,000).

In 2017, the safety barriers of five pillars were damaged when a vessel involved in illegal sand mining collided with the bridge. In 2019, damaged lighting on the bridge was repaired.

A number of media reports have highlighted risks to traffic amid widening gaps between spans.
