= Shambhuganj Bridge =

Bridge in Bangladesh

Coordinates: 24.7489°N 90.4239°E

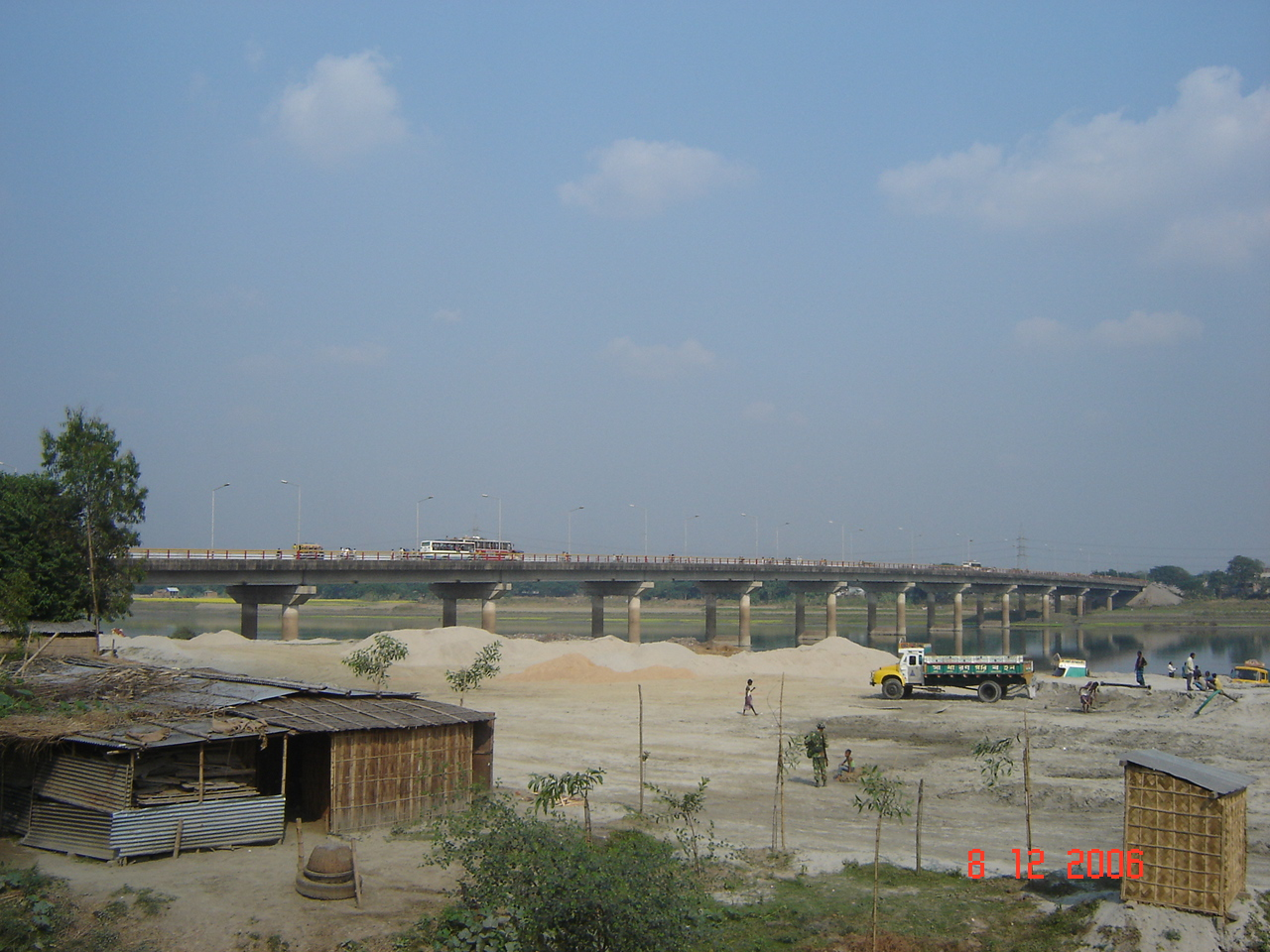
Shambhuganj Bridge

Bangladesh-China Friendship Bridge, or commonly Shambhuganj Bridge is a bridge located in Jamalpur, Bangladesh on the Brahmaputra River. This 455 meter long bridge was built in 1992 at a cost of ৳43 crore. At least 6,000 vehicles use this bridge regularly. Vehicles from Dhaka, the capital of Bangladesh, use this bridge to go to Sherpur, Netrakona and Kishoreganj districts via Mymensingh.
