= Birulia Bridge =

Birulia Bridge বিরুলিয়া সেতু
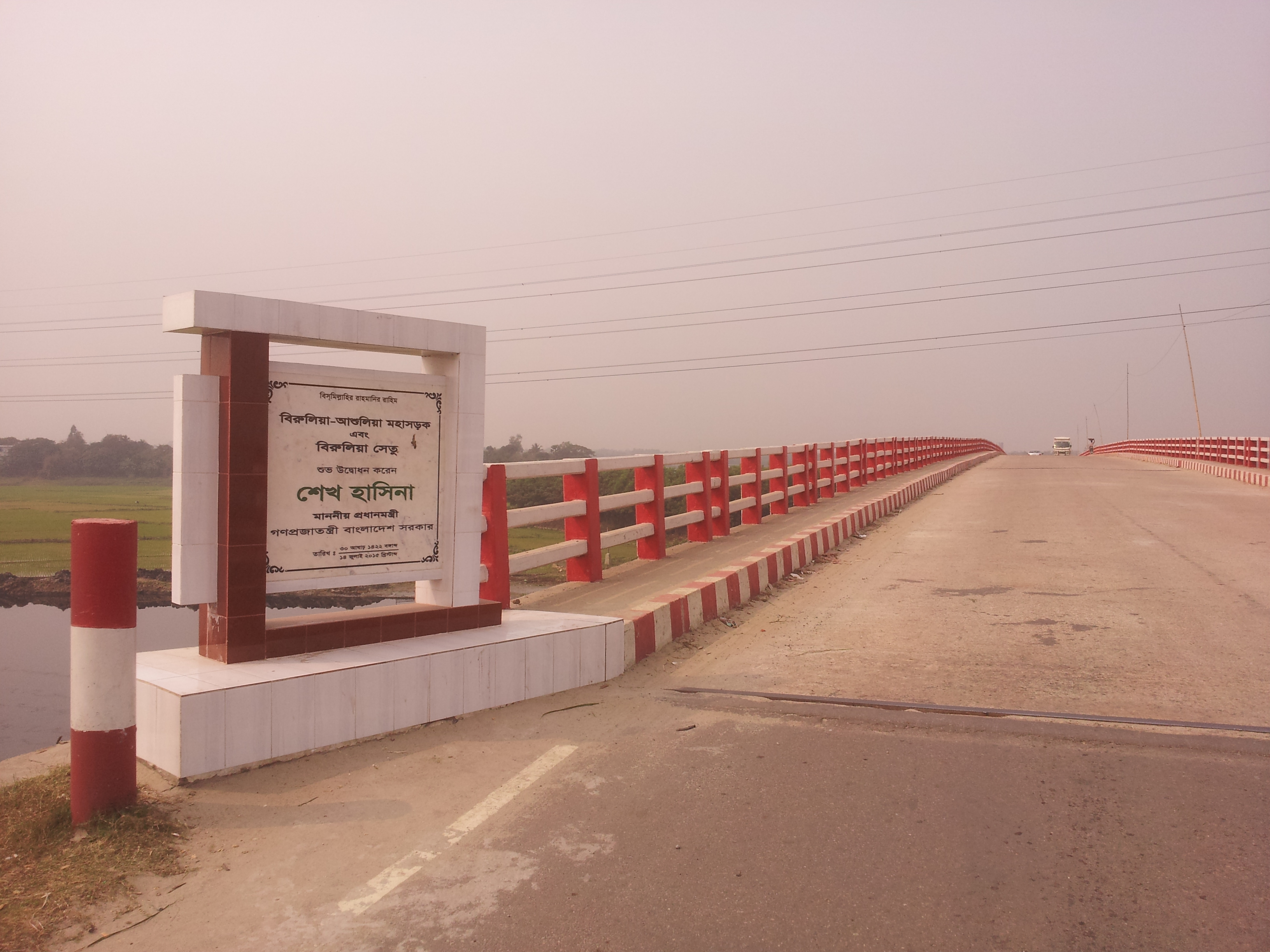
- Birulia Bridge in 2016
- Coordinates: 23.8513981°N 90.3392417°E
- Carries: Motor vehicles
- Crosses: Turag River
- Named for: Birulia
- Owner: Bangladesh Bridge Authority

Characteristics
- Total length: 186 m (0.116 mi)
- No. of lanes: 2

History
- Construction start: 2002
- Construction end: 2015
- Construction cost: ৳191.3 million
- Inaugurated: 14 July 2015

Statistics
- Toll: No

Birulia Bridge is a bridge on Turag River which connects Birulia, Savar Upazila with Mirpur Road, Dhaka, Bangladesh.

Its construction was started in 2002, but halted after half of the work was done. Later its construction was resumed in 2014 with additional ৳120 million budget. Obaidul Quader, minister of Road Transport and Bridges, assured that the bridge would be completed in December 2014. However, as of January 2015, 60% work was done and the deadline was extended to June 2015. On 14 July 2015, the bridge was inaugurated with newly-built National Highway 511. The total cost for the bridge was ৳191.3 million. As of 2016, The Bangladesh Inland Water Transport Authority had written to the Local Government Engineering Department seeking a solution as the pillars of the bridge falls in the middle of Turag river, fearing that boat movement on the waterway would be hampered. But they did not take any measures to solve the issue. According to the draft of Detailed Area Plan finalized in 2021, the bridge was proposed to be demolished and rebuilt to implement a circular waterway around Dhaka.
