= Mirkadim =

Cattle breed

Mirkadim, also known as Hasha, is a breed of cattle native to Munshiganj District of Bangladesh. The cattle is considered "premium" in Bangladesh. The Mirkadim is white in colour with a pink hue.
