= Khan Jahan Ali Bridge =

Bridge in Khulna, Bangladesh

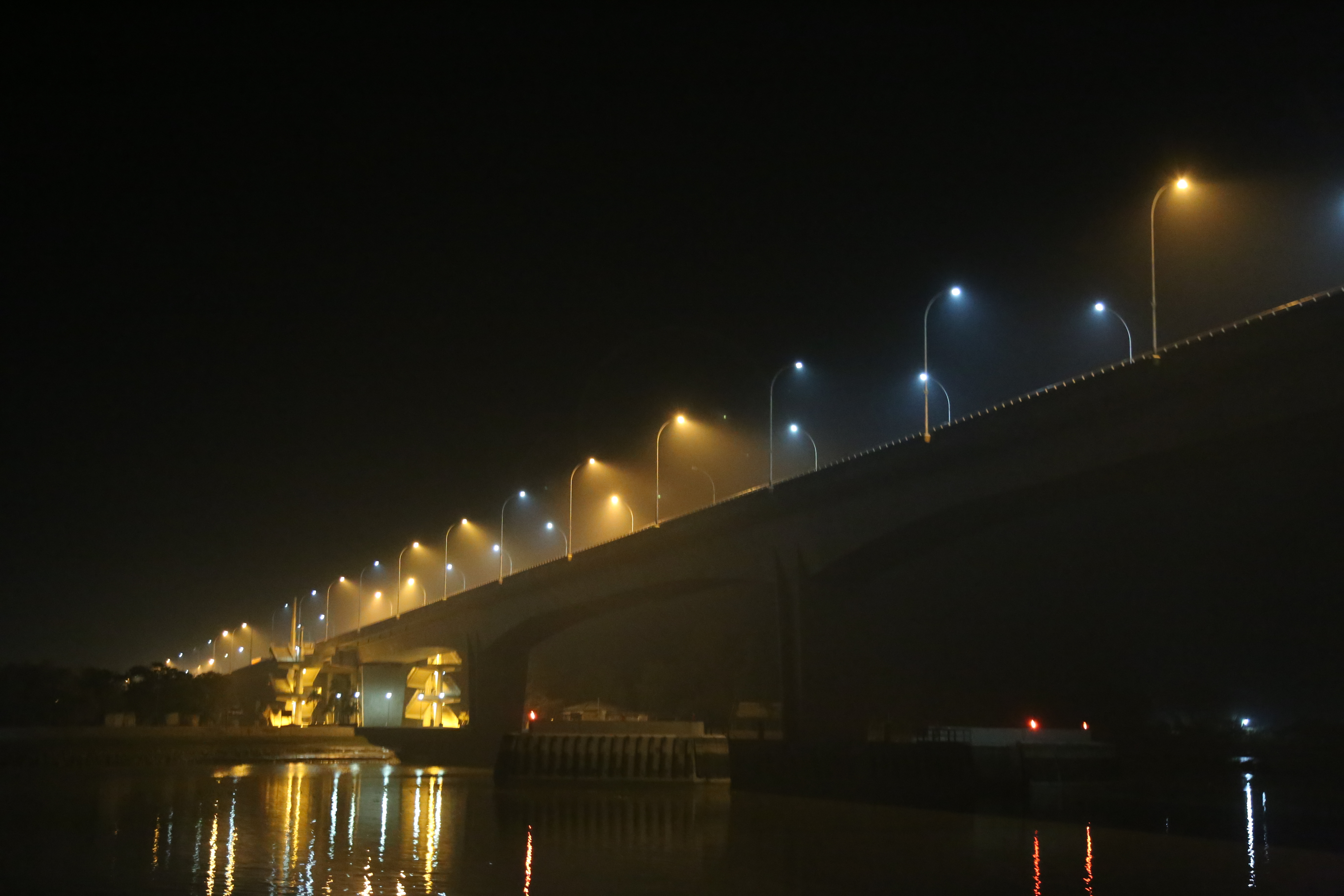
- Coordinates: 22°46′40″N 89°35′01″E
- Carries: Khulna City Bypass
- Crosses: Rupsa River
- Locale: Khulna
- Official name: Khan Jahan Ali Bridge
- Maintained by: Bangladesh Bridge Authority Ltd.
- Next upstream: Noapara Boirab Bridge
- Next downstream: Rupsha Rail Bridge

Characteristics
- Total length: 1.6 Km
- Width: 16.48 Meter

History
- Opened: 21 may 2005

Statistics
- Toll: YES

Location
- Interactive map of Khan Jahan Ali Bridge

Khan Jahan Ali Bridge (Bengali: খান জাহান আলী সেতু) is a bridge over Rupsa River in Khulna, Bangladesh and named after Khan Jahan Ali.

== History ==
In 2004, workers working at the construction site were harassed by Purba Banglar Communist Party who were trying to extort the firms involved in the construction of the bridge.

== Location ==
The bridge is located 4.80 km away from Khulna Town. It is called the gateway of Khulna because the bridge connects the Southern districts of Bangladesh with the Port of Mongla, the second largest sea port of Bangladesh. The length of the bridge is 1.6 km and its width is 16.48 meters.

== See also ==
- Rupsha Rail Bridge
