= Birulia (village) =

Birulia বিরুলিয়া
- Village
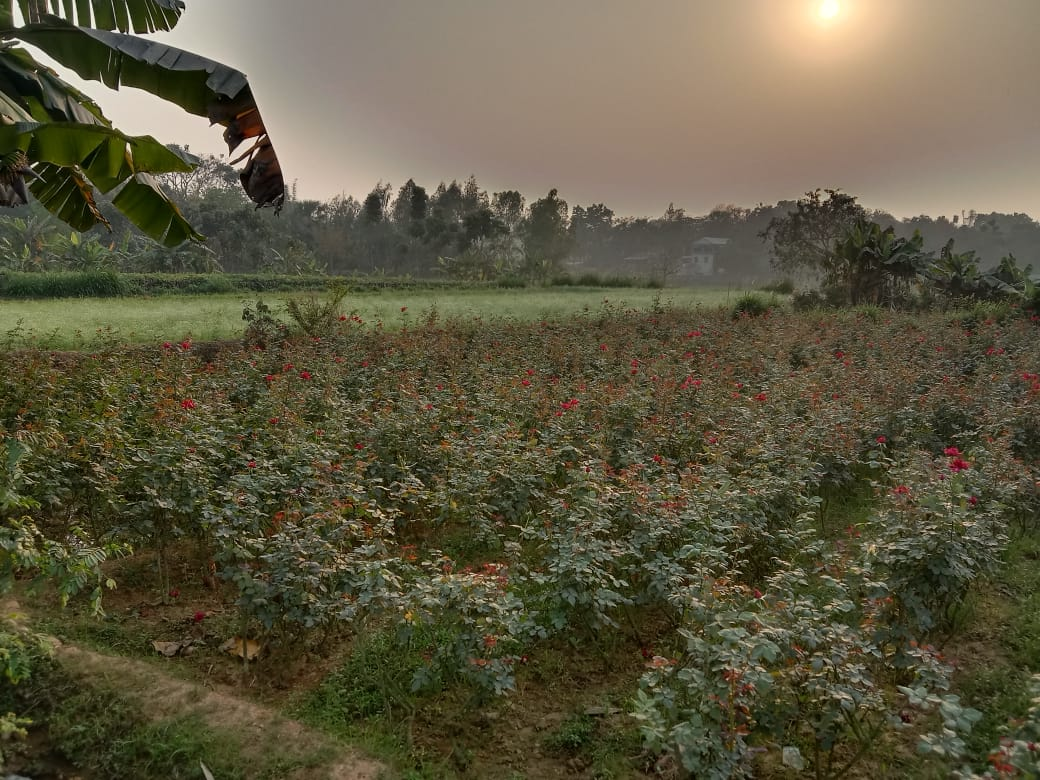
- A flower garden in Birulia

- Location in Dhaka Division Birulia (Bangladesh)
- Coordinates: 23.8532824°N 90.3140394°E
- Country: Bangladesh
- Division: Dhaka
- District: Dhaka
- Upazilla: Savar

Government
  - Type: Union Council
  - Body: Birulia

Languages
  - National: Bengali
- Time zone: UTC+6:00 (BST)
- PIN code: 1216

Birulia is a village in Dhaka District of Bangladesh. It is a union council under the Savar Upazila.

== Details ==
It is located on the bank of Turag River towards Mirpur Model Thana in Dhaka. There is a highway from Ashulia and a bridge across the Turag River to access this village. This village is known for flower cultivation and is also called as "Rose Village". Around 1990s, a person from Mirpur came to this village and started flower cultivation and gradually flower cultivation became popular in the village. More than 100 crore flowers are produced annually in the 2000 bigha land of the village. Here Nalini Mohan Saha, a zamindar, built a palace. Later, Rajinikanth Ghosh bought that zamindar palace for living. The zamindar house has seven buildings. The government has planned to construct an inter-district bus terminal here.
