= Burishwar River =

River in Bangladesh

Coordinates: 22.24616°N 90.2139°E

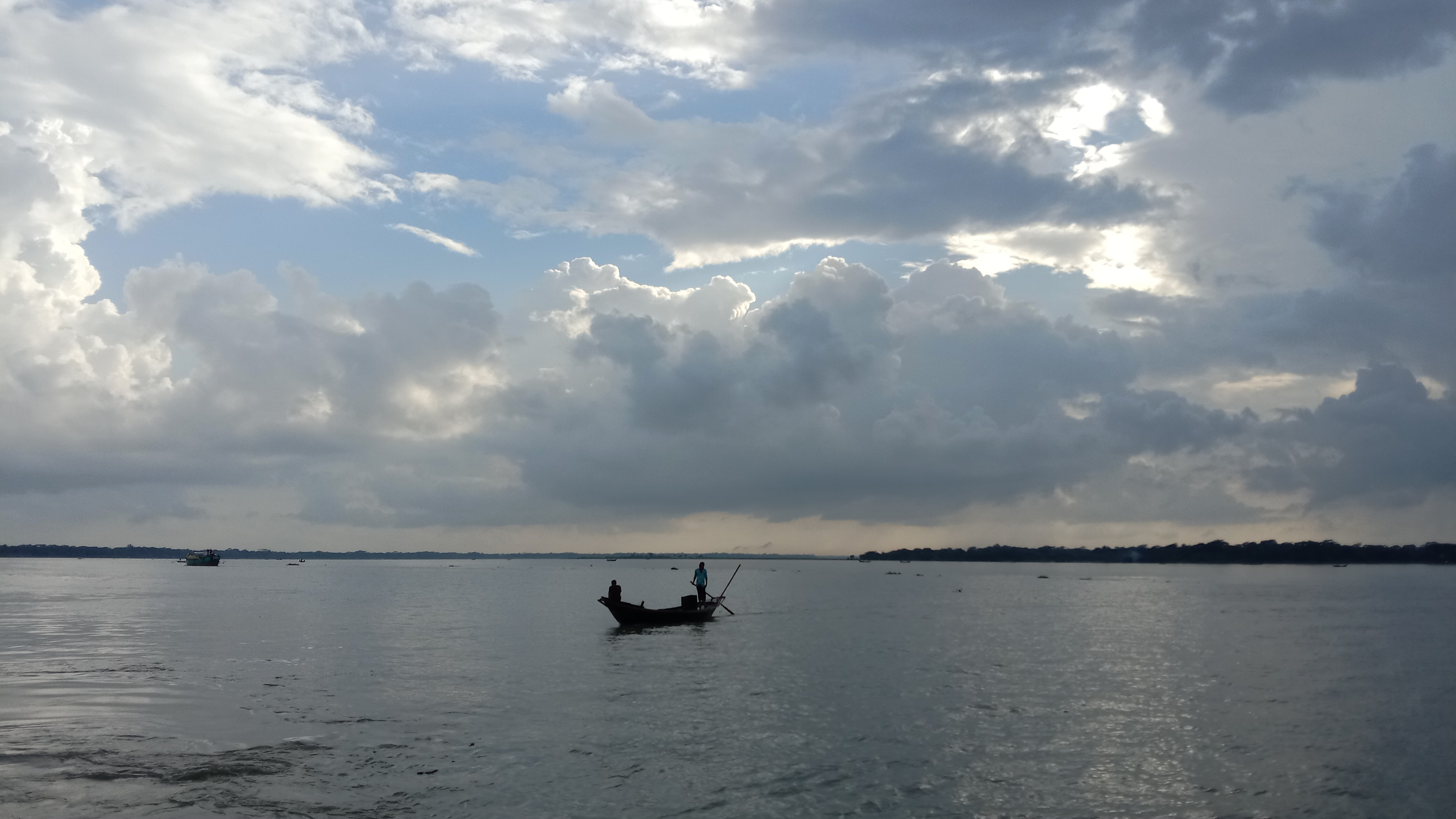
Paira or Burishwar River in Barguna

Burishwar River or Paira River is a river in Barisal, Patuakhali and Barguna Districts in southwestern Bangladesh. The length of the river is 90 km, the average width is 1200 metres and the nature of the river is spiral. The identification number provided by Bangladesh Water Development Board of the Burieshwar-Paira is river no. 57 in southwestern region.
