= N1 (Bangladesh) =

National Highway in Bangladesh

N1
- Dhaka–Chittagong Highway
- Map of the National Highway 1 in red

Route information
- Part of AH41
- Length: 465 km (289 mi)

Major junctions
- Dhaka end: Saidabad Connecting with Jatrabari Flyover
- List: N8 in Jatrabari R111 in Signboard R110 in Shimrail N2 in Kanchpur N105 in Madanpur Z1066 in Mograpara near Sonargaon Z1402 in Gouripur Z1053 in Gouripur Z1044 in Amirabad Z1042 in Eliotganj Z1008 in Chandina N102 in Cumilla Cantonment R141 in Alekharchar R140 & R141 in Paduar Bazar Z1034 in Feni N104 in Mahipal Z1032 in Muhuriganj R151 in Baroiar Hat N106 in Muradpur in Chittagong N107 in Bahaddarhat in Chittagong N108 in Keranihat in Satkania R172 in Chakaria N110 in Cox's Bazar Z1099 in Teknaf Z1098 in Teknaf
- To: Teknaf, Cox's Bazar

Location
- Country: Bangladesh

Highway system
- Roads in Bangladesh
← N8	→ N2

The N1 or Dhaka–Chittagong Highway is the main transportation artery of Bangladesh, connecting the capital city of Dhaka and the southern port city of Chittagong. Approximately 465 kilometres (289 miles) in length, the highway starts at Jatrabari in Dhaka and ends at Teknaf in Cox's Bazar. The highway is known along certain stretches as the Chittagong–Cox's Bazar Highway and the Cox's Bazar–Teknaf Highway.

Currently four lanes with an eight-lane expansion underway, the N1 is the busiest road in the country and a top development priority.

== Background ==
When constructed, the highway was limited to two lanes of traffic for most of its length. In 2009, it was estimated that daily usage of the highway was 20,000–25,000 motorised vehicles, up 40% of which were trucks. Traffic jams or tailbacks lasting many hours have been reported. In one instance in July 2015, a truck losing one of its tyres in Cumilla created a 22 kilometres (14 miles) long tailback.

The highway forms a critical component of the proposed Asian Highway Network route AH41 and the Central-South-East Asian economic corridor, including initiatives such as BCIM.

== Expansion and development ==
=== Dhaka–Chittagong highway ===
==== Four lanes ====
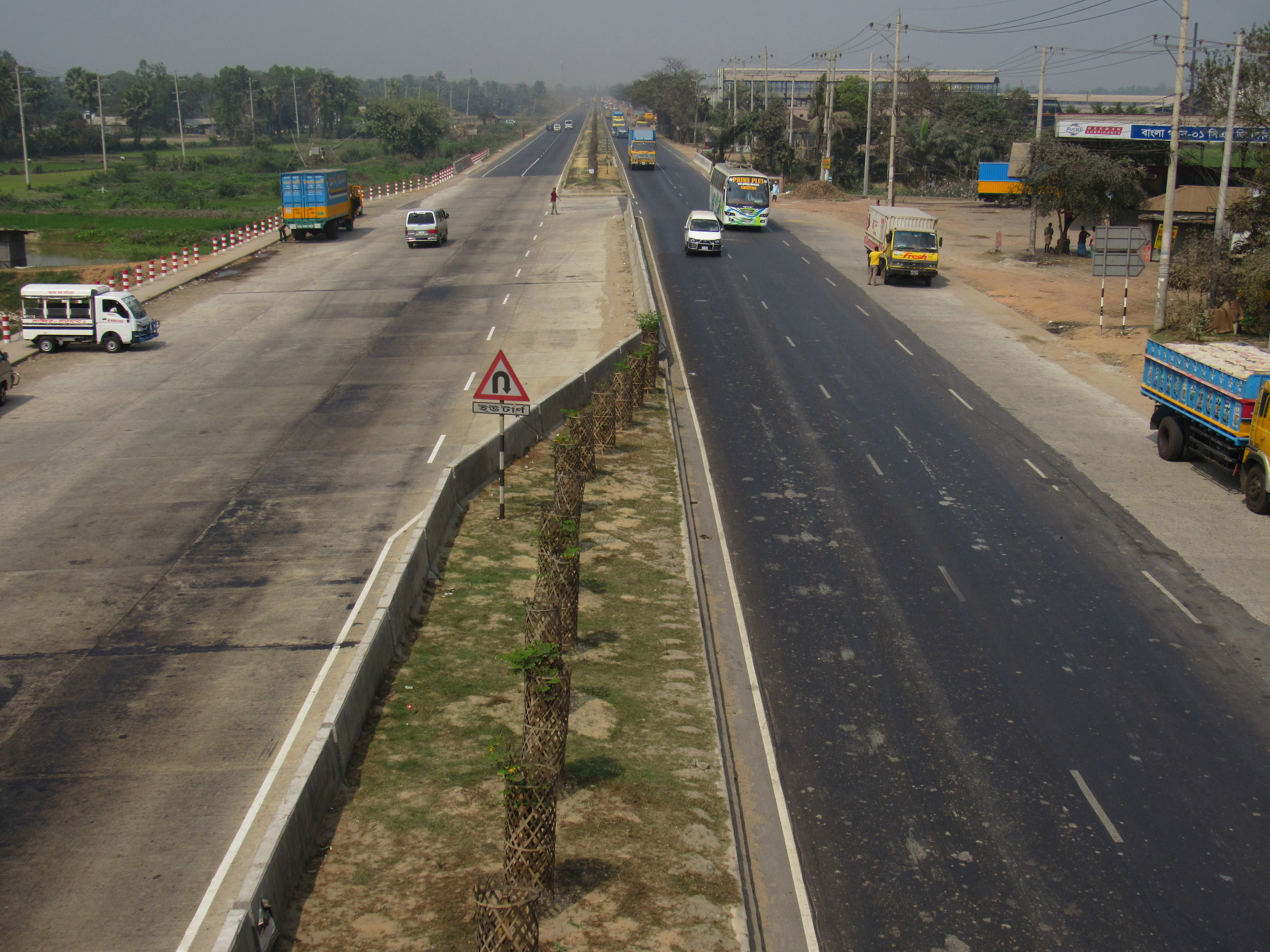
Dhaka-Chittagong Highway after expansion

In January 2010, construction work to expand the Dhaka–Chittagong stretch from two to four lanes commenced. The project was expected to decrease travel time from Dhaka to Chittagong to 4.5 or 5 hours.

As of March 2013, only 23.5 per cent of work has been completed, and it was unlikely to meet its December 2013 deadline. Construction included 221 culverts, 22 bridges and three flyovers. Reza Construction Ltd. and Sino Hydro have set temporary camps for this purpose respectively near Daudkandi and Chandina in Cumilla District.

After inauguration being postponed several times, the project, implemented by the Roads and Highways Department (RHD), was finally completed and opened on 2 July 2016, three years behind schedule and a full decade after the plan was approved.

The total cost for the expansion of the stretch was ৳3817 crore (US$310 million), up from the initial estimate of ৳2161 crore (US$180 million) in 2006.

==== Eight lanes ====
An upgrade of the Dhaka–Chittagong section to eight lanes to start construction by late 2024 or early 2025 is on the cards. Portions of the 229-kilometre (142 mi) road will be converted into six lanes, while others will be expanded to eight lanes. The total cost of the project is estimated at ৳73150 crore (US$6.0 billion). The Asian Development Bank (ADB) will provide financing for this project—which is going to be implemented in three phases—according to the RHD.

=== Chittagong–Cox's Bazar highway ===
==== Bypass lanes ====
The RHD is planning to alleviate traffic congestion on the Chittagong–Cox's Bazar route by constructing bypass lanes and flyovers at five crucial points. This initiative is prompted by the upcoming opening of the Matarbari Deep Sea Port in 2026, which is anticipated to increase traffic on the current two-lane highway. The project includes the construction of four-lane bypasses at Patiya (5.4 kilometres (3.4 mi)), Dohazari (3.3 kilometres (2.1 mi)), Lohagara (5.1 kilometres (3.2 mi)), and Chakaria (6.8 kilometres (4.2 mi)), along with a six-lane flyover at Keranihat (3.5 kilometres (2.2 mi)).

==== Four lanes ====
The RHD is also upgrading the Chittagong–Cox's Bazar highway to four lanes, at an initial estimated cost of ৳18000 crore (US$1.5 billion). This project aims to expand 110 kilometres (68 mi) of the 169 kilometres (105 mi) highway into four lanes, as sections of the highway have already been upgraded earlier.

== Route description ==
=== In Dhaka District ===
From Jatrabari to Signboard 6 km in Dhaka District.

=== In Narayanganj District ===
This highway runs on three Upazilas of Narayangaj district. Upazilas are Narayanganj Sadar Upazila, Bandar Upazila and Sonargaon Upazila. From Signboard to Meghna Bridge, total length of N1 highway runs on this district is 19 km.

=== In Munshiganj District ===
The highway exceeded only one upazila of Munshiganj district and that is Gazaria Upazila. From Meghna Bridge to Meghna-Gumti bridge, total length of highway runs on this district is 11 km.

=== In Cumilla District ===
N1 exceeds eight upazilas of Cumilla district, Daudkandi Upazila, Muradnagar Upazila, Debidwar Upazila, Chandina Upazila, Burichang Upazila, Cumilla Adarsha Sadar Upazila, Cumilla Sadar South Upazila and Chauddagram Upazila. Length of N1 in Cumilla district is 97 km.

=== In Feni District ===
N1 exceeded two upazila of Feni district, Feni Sadar Upazila and Chhagalnaiya Upazila. Length of N1 in Feni district is 31 km.

=== In Chittagong District ===
N1 exceeds seven upazilas on Chittagong district including Chittagong city. Upazilas are Mirsharai Upazila, Sitakunda Upazila, Boalkhali Upazila, Patiya Upazila, Chandanaish Upazila, Satkania Upazila and Lohagara Upazila. Length of N1 in Chittagong District is 148.06 km.

=== In Cox's Bazar District ===
N1 exceeds four upazilas of Cox's bazar district. Upazilas are Chakaria Upazila, Ramu Upazila, Ukhia Upazila and Teknaf Upazila. Length of N1 in Cox's Bazar District is 148.87 km.

== Gallery ==
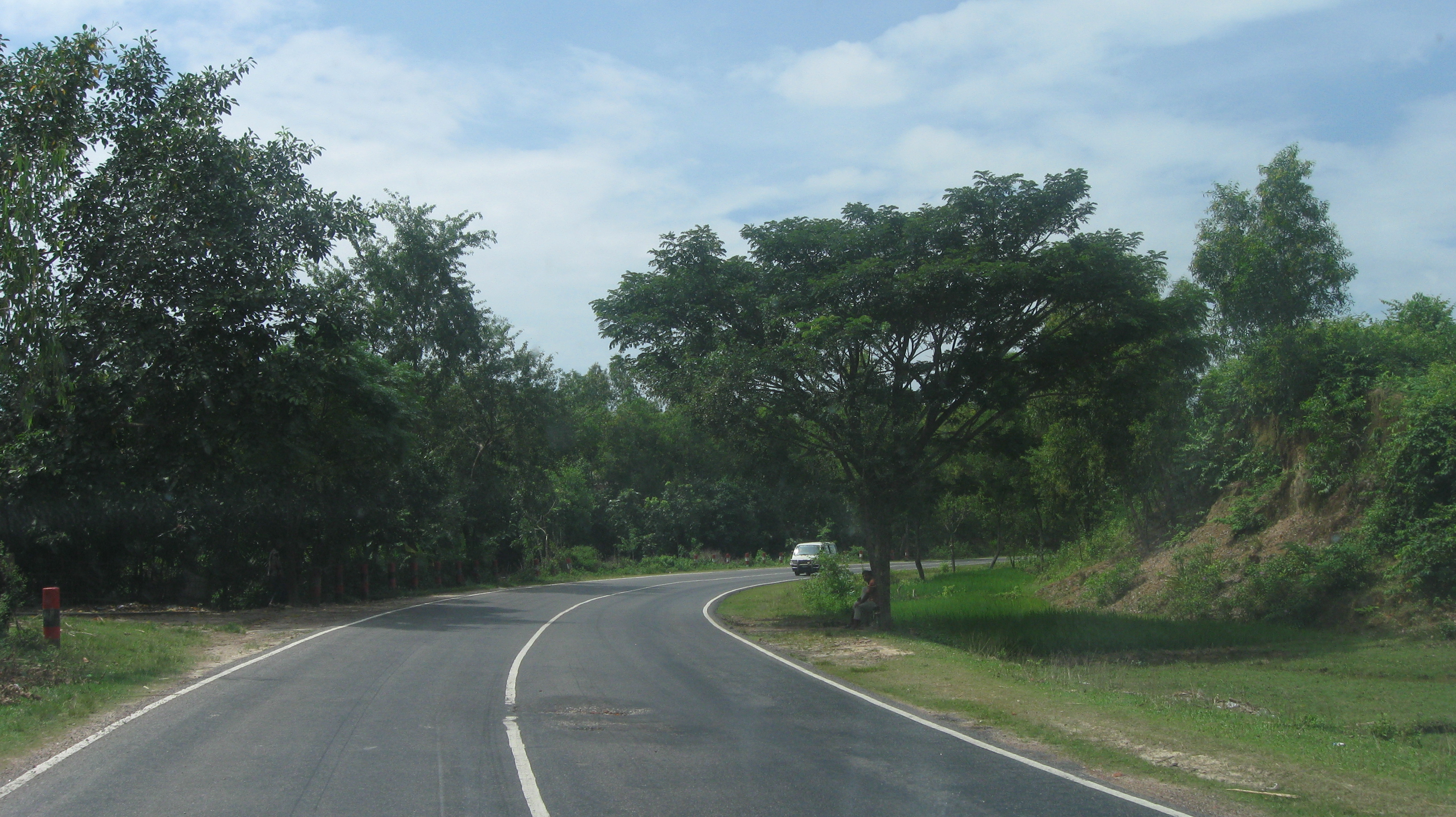
N1 toward Chakoria, Cox's Bazar

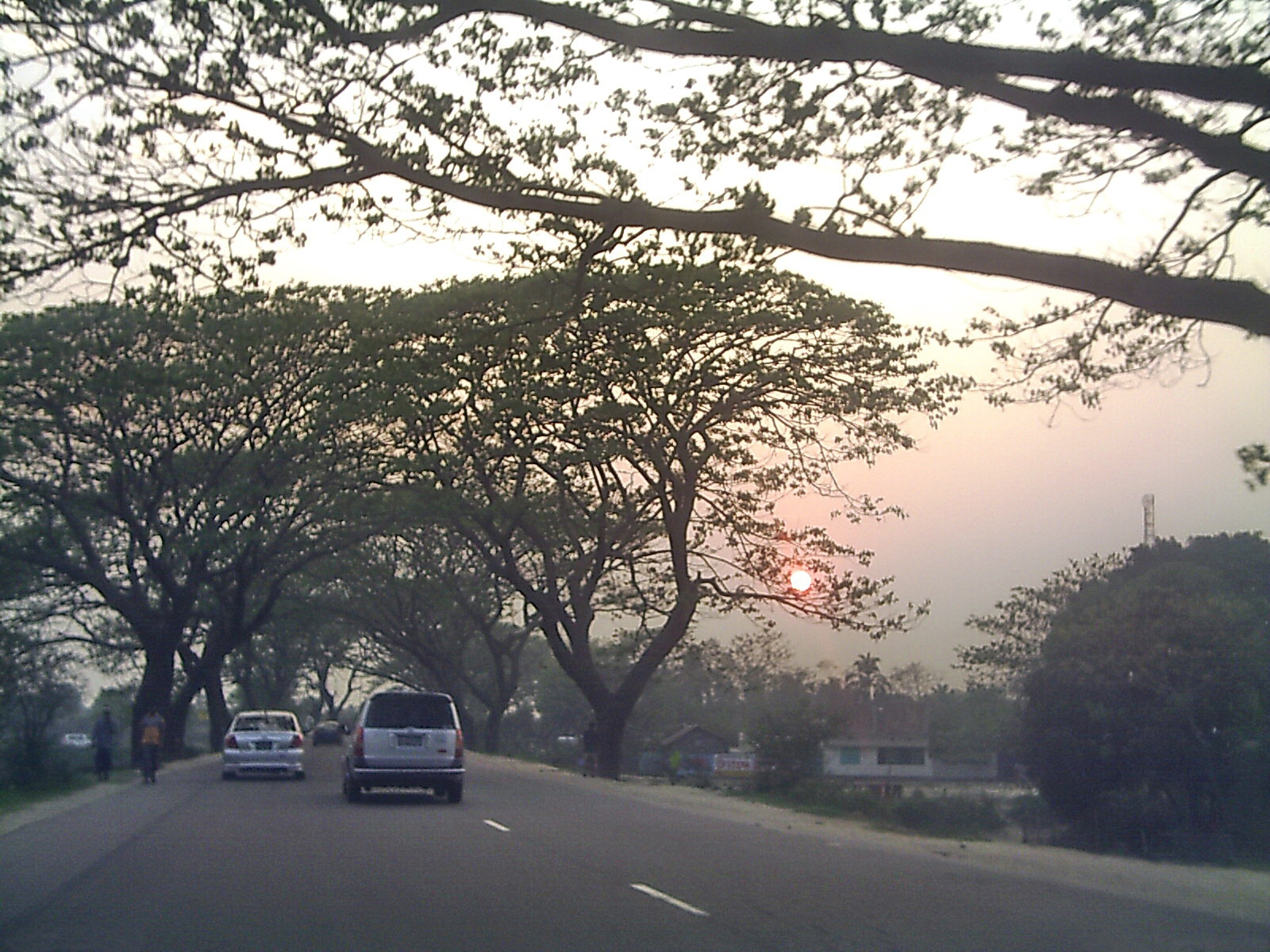
at Elliotganj, Cumilla.

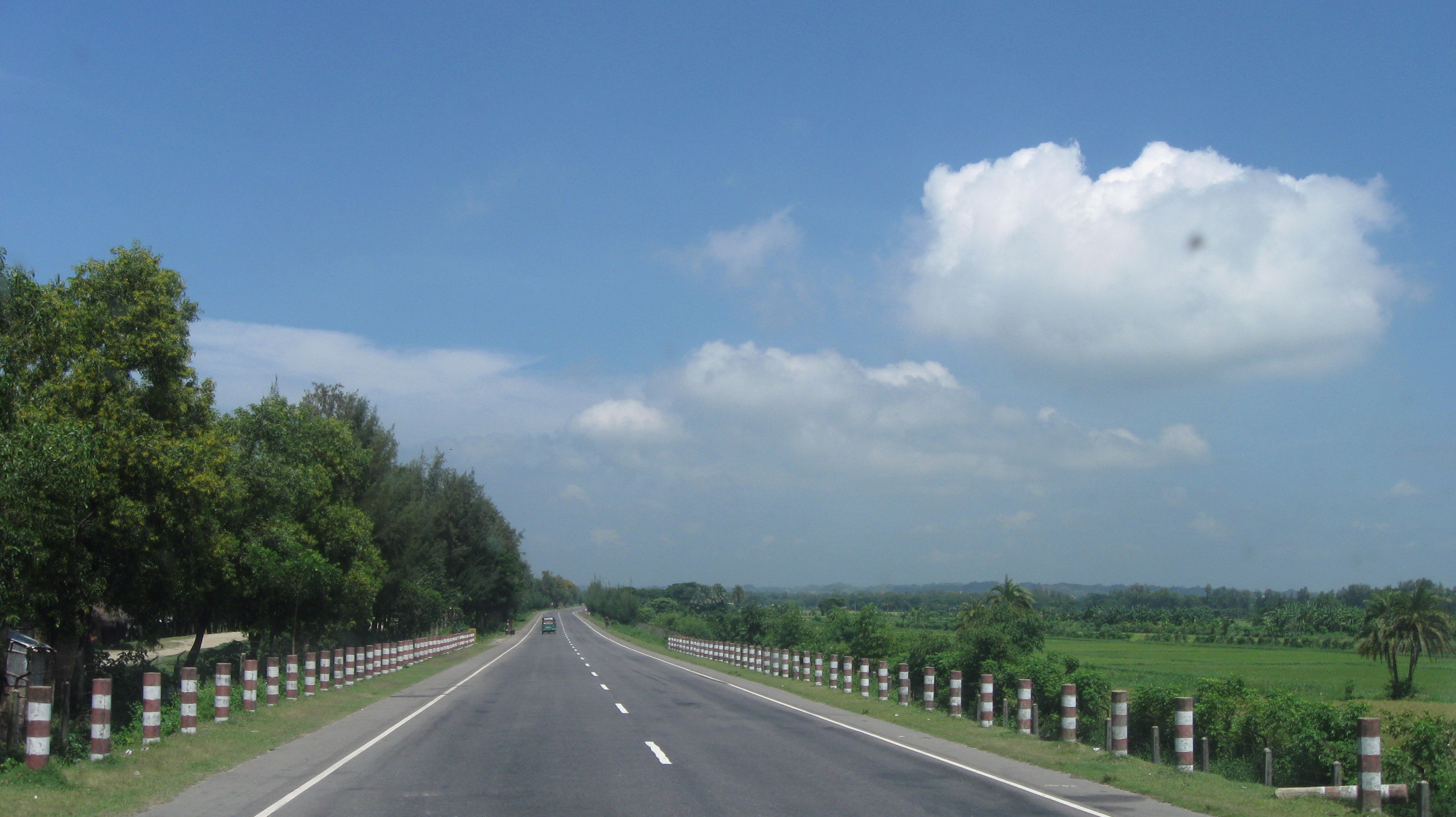
Chittagong Bypass, connects Port of Chittagong with Dhaka–Chittagong Highway, through Patenga

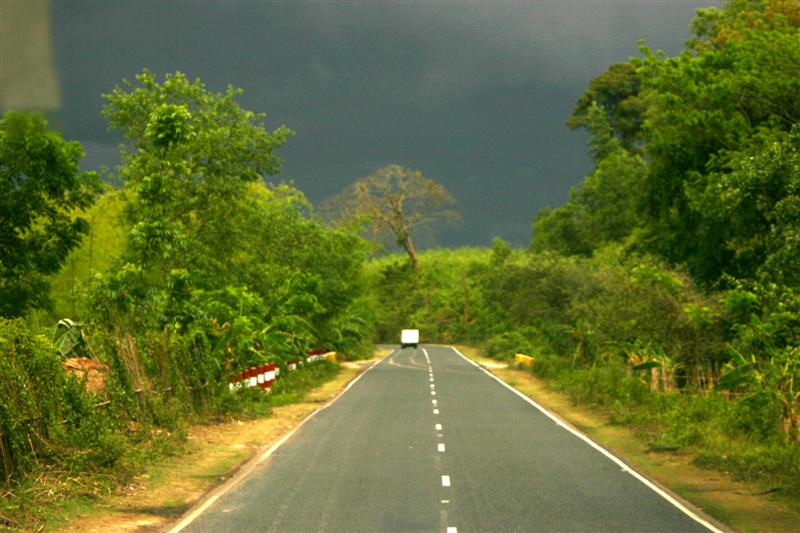
Dhaka–Chittagong Highway.

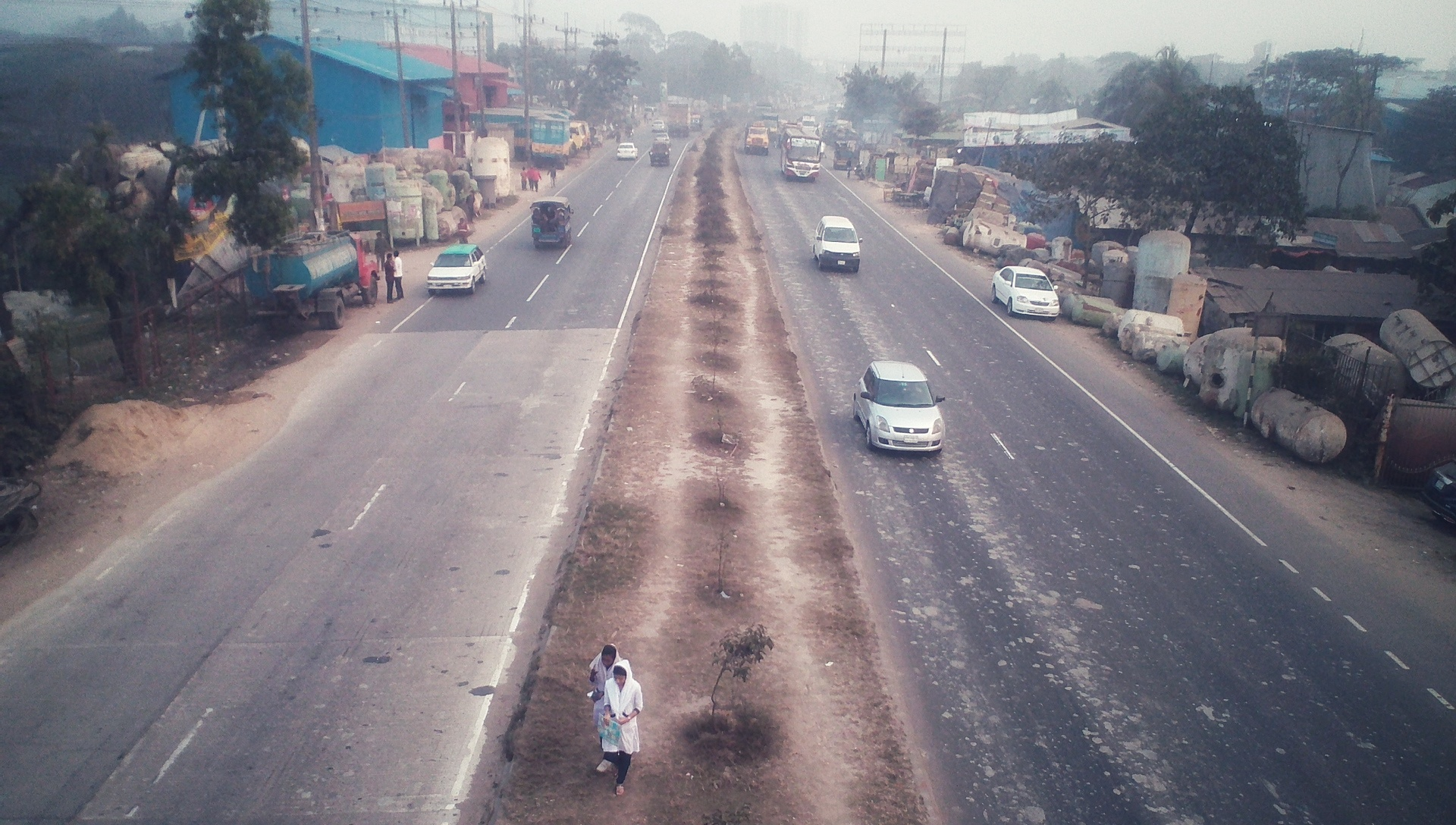
At Bhatiary

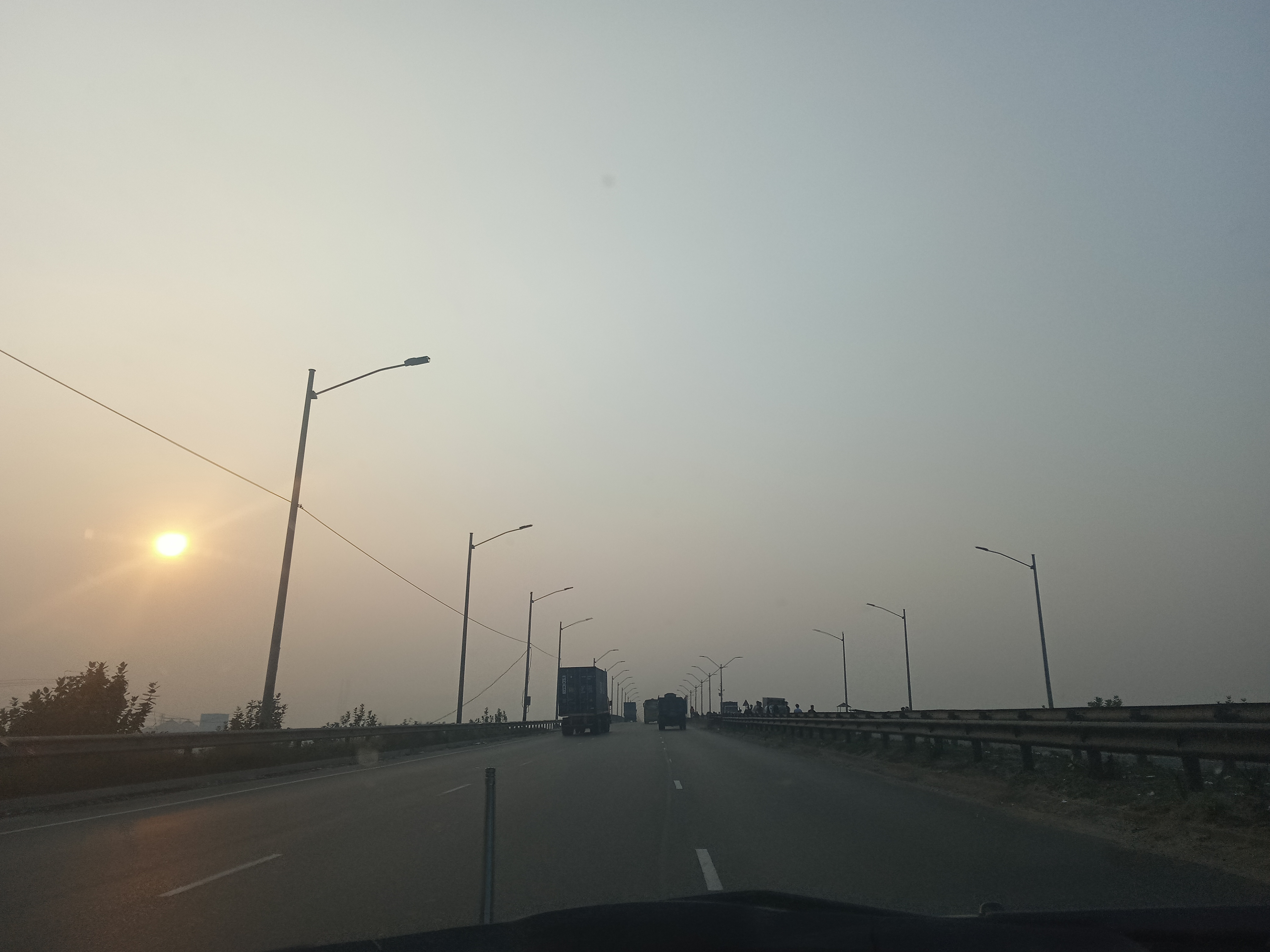
Meghna-Gumti Bridge

== See also ==
- List of roads in Bangladesh
