= Meghna Bridge =

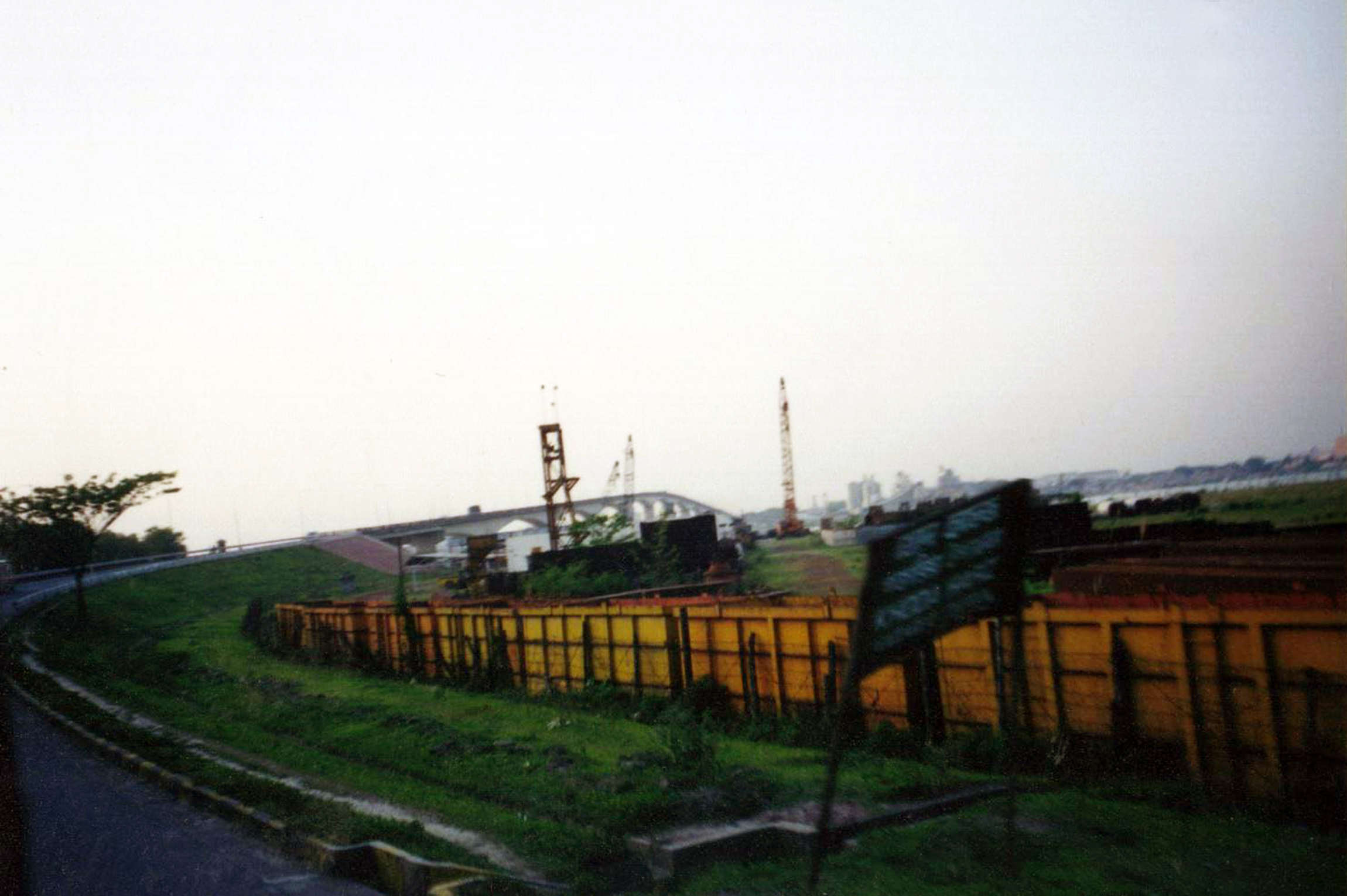
- Coordinates: 23°36.162′N 90°36.991′E
- Carries: Motor vehicles and pedestrians
- Crosses: Meghna River
- Locale: Bangladesh
- Official name: Japan Bangladesh Friendship Bridge 1

Characteristics
- Design: Cantilever bridge
- Material: Prestressed concrete
- Total length: 900 metres (2,952 ft 9 in)
- Width: 9.2 metres (30 ft 2 in)
- Longest span: 87 metres (285 ft 5 in)

History
- Constructed by: Nippon Koei Co. Ltd
- Opened: February 1, 1991

The Meghna Bridge is a road bridge in Bangladesh. It was built with the assistance of Japan and officially named Japan Bangladesh Friendship Bridge 1, but it is popularly known as Meghna Bridge, after the river it spans. According to a study conducted in 2004 by the Embassy of Japan in Bangladesh, residents living around the Meghna Bridge recognized several positive impacts after the construction of the bridge.

== Location ==
Meghna Bridge is 30 kilometres (19 mi) southeast of Dhaka. It spans the Meghna River, which is one of the major rivers in the country. The Dhaka–Chittagong Highway crosses the bridge. The geographic coordinates of the bridge are 23°36.162′N 90°36.991′E.

== History ==
Meghna Bridge was built with the financial help from the government of Japan. It was constructed by Nippon Koei Co. Ltd., (an independent engineering consulting firm in Japan that has been involved in projects in more than 80 countries). The bridge was opened on February 1, 1991. Meghna Bridge is the single largest project with Japanese assistance in the world.

In 2005, the bridge underwent extensive repair because the expansion joints of the bridge were damaged due to the lack of appropriate maintenance. In 2012–13, the bridge underwent even more extensive repair because the expansion joints of the bridge were damaged due to the lack of appropriate maintenance. Also piers were protected from scour at river bed.

== Architecture ==
Meghna Bridge is a cantilever and girder bridge. It is 930 metres (3,051 ft 2 in) in length with dual carriageway and 9.2 metres (30 ft 2 in) in width. The bridge has thirteen spans. Two among the individual spans are of 24.25 metres (79 ft 7 in) in length each, one is of 48.3 metres (158 ft 6 in) in length, nine spans are of 87 metres (285 ft 5 in) in length each and the length of the rest is 18.2 metres (59 ft 9 in). The carriage way of the bridge is 7.2 metres (23 ft 7 in). The foundations are supported on RCC caissons and piles. Piled foundation of abutments are buried. RCC caissons which are used as foundation under the piers are also buried. Both abutments and the piers of the bridge are RCC solid type. The piers of the bridge are hexagonal. Each pier is of 11 metres (36 ft 1 in) in length and 3.2 metres (10 ft 6 in) in width.

The wing walls of the bridge are of RCC and are fixed with abutments and have no weep holes. Railing type of the bridge is of R.C.C post and steel rail. The bridge has 0.80 metres (2 ft 7 in) wide sidewalk at both sides. Meghna Bridge also has infrastructure of drainage.

== Economic impact ==
Traffic volumes across the Meghna River and of National Highway No. 1 significantly increased after the opening of the Meghna Bridge. In April 1997, an average of 10,149 vehicles of all types used the bridge in each 24 hours while March 2004 saw 9,704 vehicles per day. The reason behind this fall in traffic volume is attributed to increase in toll rate in 2002 and seasonal fluctuations. Below is a comparison of vehicles using the bridge per day in April 1997 and March 2004:

Vehicle	Truck	Bus	Light Vehicle	Motorcycle	Total
April 1997	4,674	3,396	1,796	283	10,149
March 2004	4,310	3,887	1,030	477	9,704

The survey conducted in 2004 by the Embassy of Japan in Bangladesh found that a majority of the users of the bridge believe that the construction of the Meghna Bridge improved the life of the people living near it and the surrounding area of the bridge has been urbanized. The people surveyed opined that the number of traffic blockage caused by bad weather has been decreased since the construction. The survey also found that 42% of the trucks using Meghna Bridge transport goods between Dhaka and Chittagong.
