= Rupsa River =

River in Bangladesh

Coordinates: 22°45′N 89°33′E

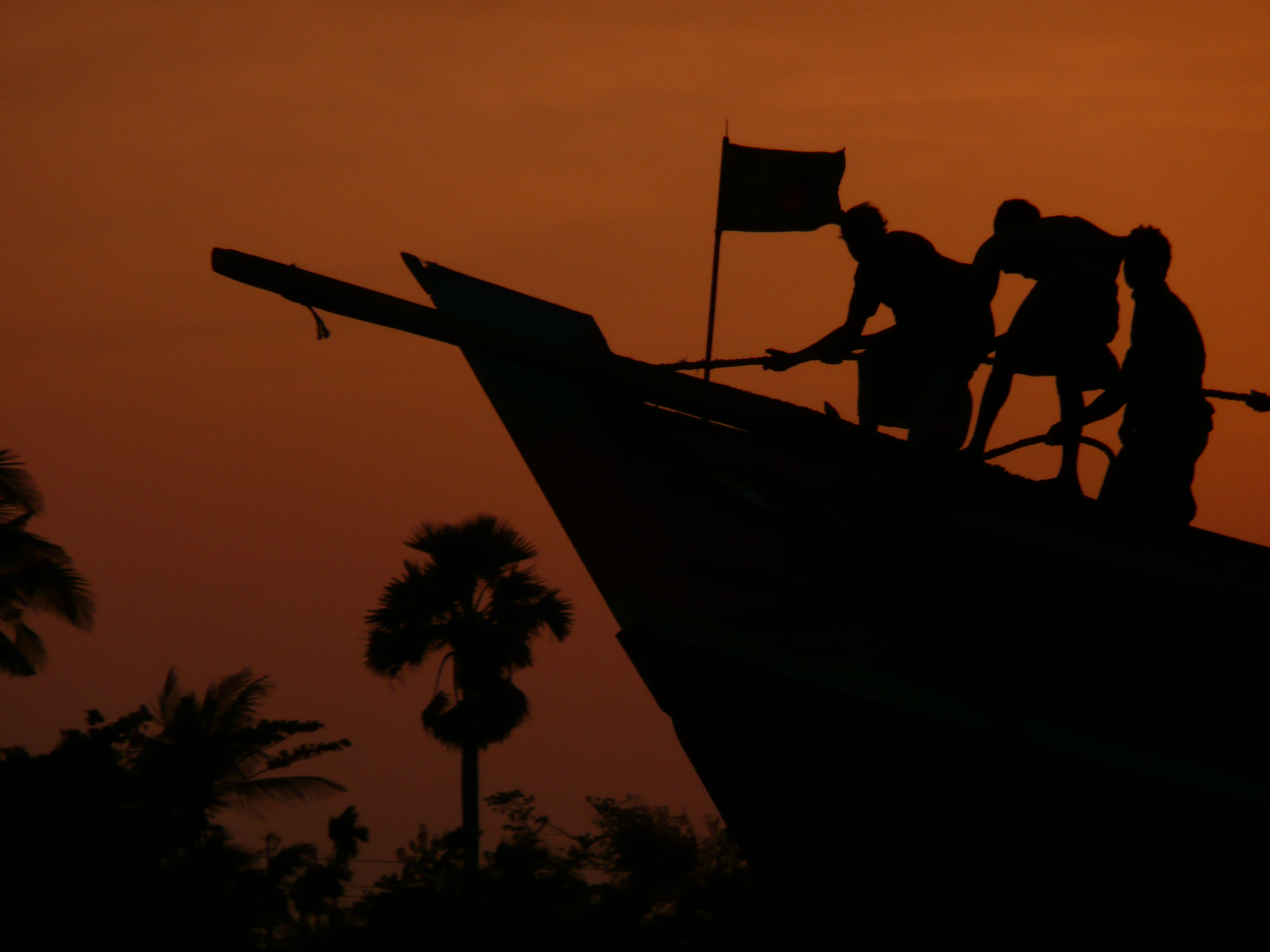
Ship on the Rupsa River

The Rupsa is a river in southwestern Bangladesh and a distributary of the Ganges. The Rupsa is one of the most famous rivers of Bangladesh.

== Description ==
It forms the confluence of the Bhairab and Madhumati rivers, and flows into the Pasur River. Its entire length is affected by tides.

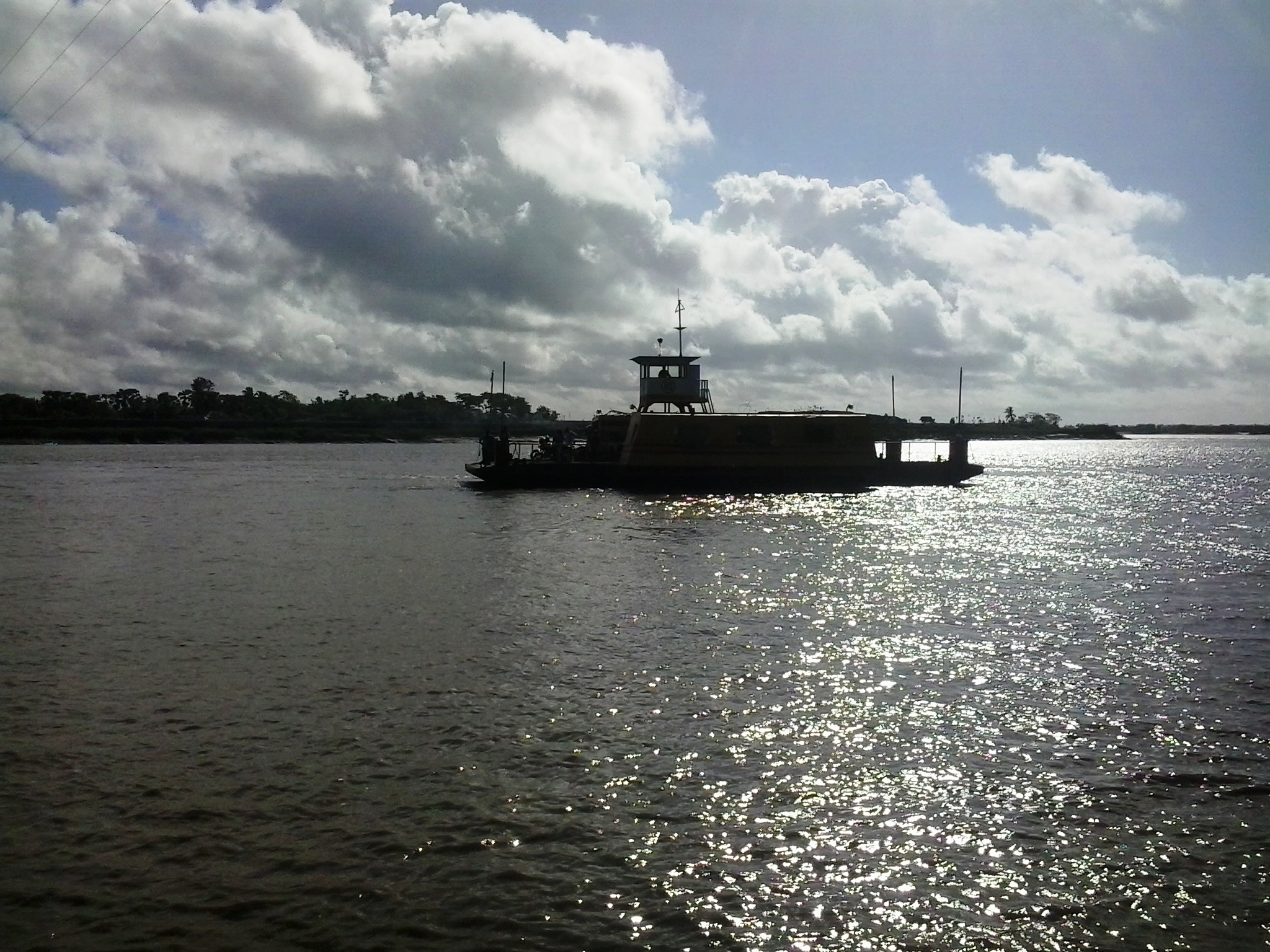
Rupsa river, Khulna

The Rupsa flows by Khulna, and connects to the Bay of Bengal through Poshur river at Mongla channel. Near Chalna, it changes its name to Pasur River and flows into the Bay of Bengal.

A significant number of fisheries, dockyards, shipyards and factories are situated along the banks of this river. A considerable population depends on catching fish in the river. A bridge over the river, named Khan Jahan Ali Bridge, connects the Khulna and Bagerhat districts.
