= Grand Trunk Road =

International road in South Asia

Coordinates: 27°20′15″N 79°3′45″E

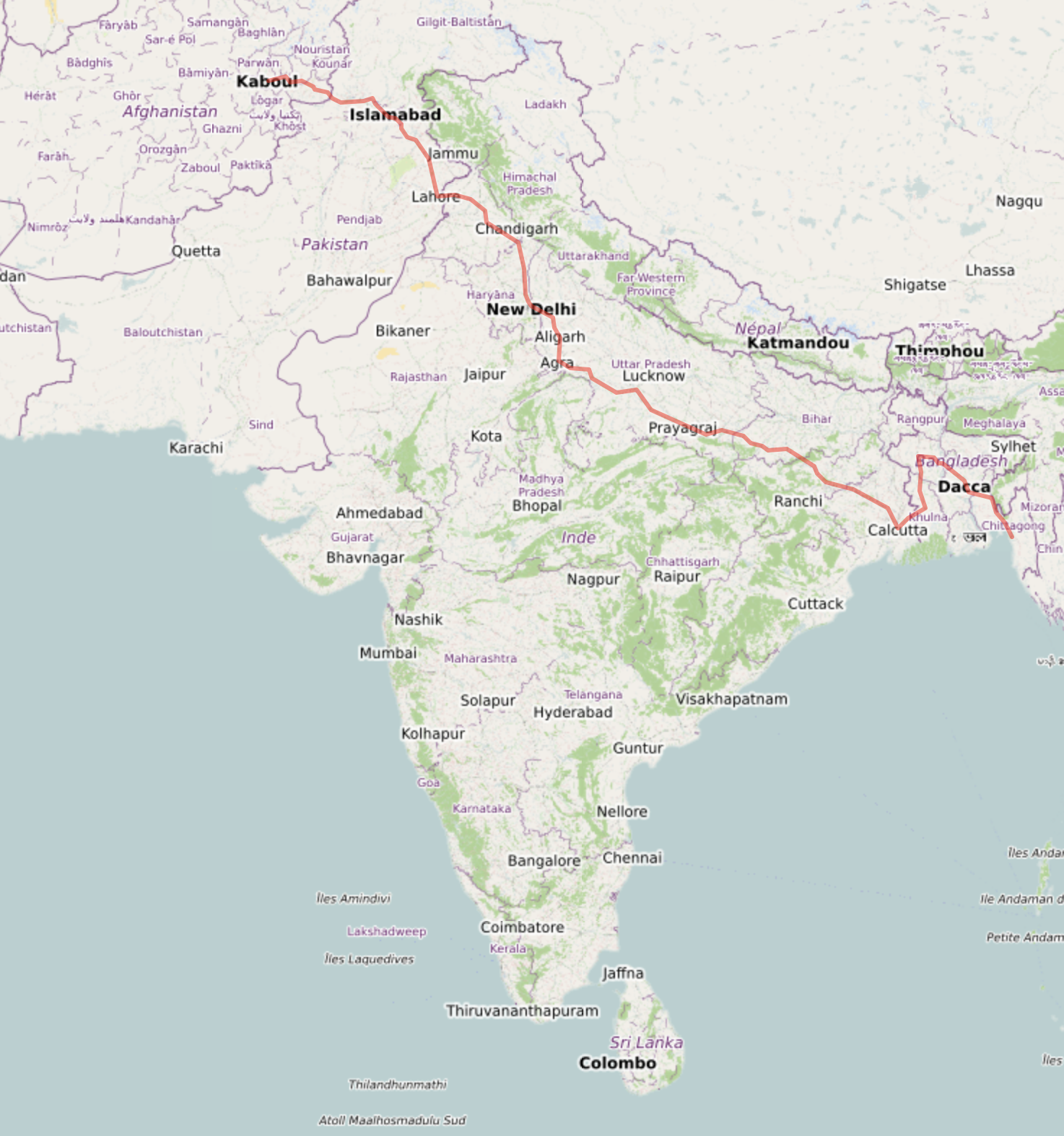

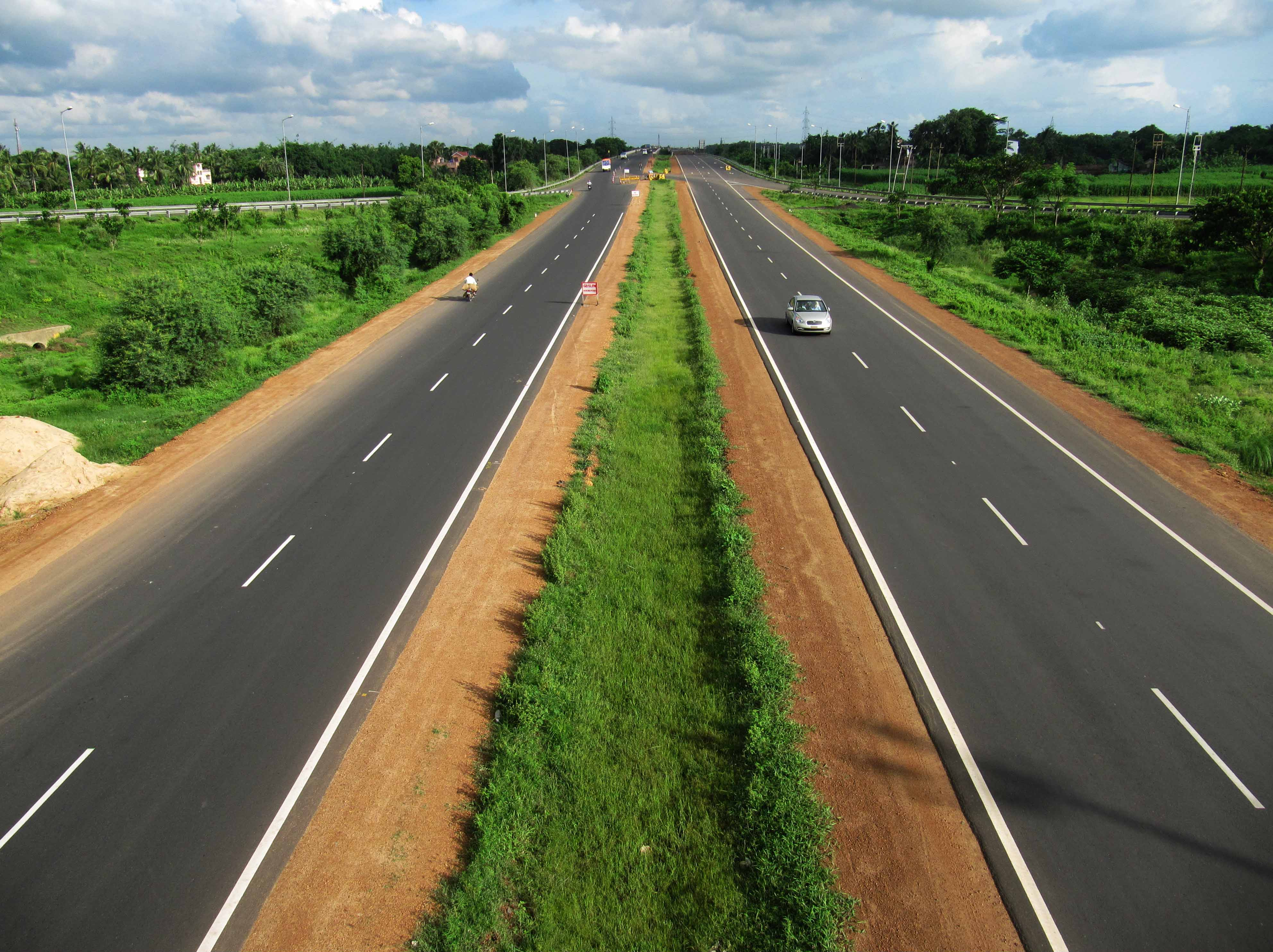
- Grand Trunk Road passing through West Bengal in India

Route information
- Length: 3,655 km (2,271 mi)
- Status: functional
- Time period: 4th century BCE – present
- Known for: Trading

Major junctions
- East end: Teknaf, Bangladesh
- West end: Kabul, Afghanistan

Location
- Major cities: List: Cox's Bazar, Chittagong, Feni, Dhaka, Rajshahi, Kolkata, Sasaram, Mughalsarai, Varanasi, Mainpuri, Prayagraj, Kanpur, Agra, Aligarh, Bulandshahr, Delhi, Sonipat, Panipat, Karnal, Ambala, Ludhiana, Jalandhar, Amritsar, Chandigarh, Lahore, Gujranwala, Jhelum, Islamabad, Rawalpindi, Peshawar, Jalalabad, Kabul

The Grand Trunk Road (Note: The road was known as Uttarapatha during the Mauryan period (16th Century), Sadak-e-Azam or Shah Rah-e-Azam (The Great Road) during Suri period (1540-1556 CE), as Badshahi Sadak (King's Road) during Mughal by Sher Shah period and as the Grand Trunk Road or Long Walk during the British period.) is one of the oldest and longest major roads in Asia. For at least 2,500 years it has linked Central Asia to South Asia. It runs roughly 3,655 km (2,271 mi) from Teknaf, Bangladesh on the border with Myanmar west to Kabul, Afghanistan, passing through Chittagong and Dhaka in Bangladesh, Calcutta, Kanpur, Prayagraj, Agra, Aligarh, Bulandshahr, Ghaziabad, Delhi, Amritsar, Chandigarh in India, and Lahore, Rawalpindi, and Peshawar in Pakistan.

The highway was built along an ancient route called Uttarapatha (Sanskrit: उत्तरापथ) in the 3rd century BCE, extending it from the mouth of the Ganges to the north-western frontier of India. Further improvements to this road were made under Ashoka. The old route was re-aligned by Sher Shah Suri to Sonargaon and Rohtas. The Afghan end of the road was rebuilt under Mahmud Shah Durrani. The road was considerably rebuilt in the British period between 1833 and 1860. Over the centuries, the road acted as one of the major trade routes in the region and facilitated both travel and postal communication. The Grand Trunk Road is still used for transportation in the present-day Indian subcontinent, where parts of the road have been widened and included in the national highway system.

== History ==
=== Ancient period ===
The Buddhist literature refer to the existence of Grand Trunk Road even before the Maurya Empire as Uttarapatha or the "Northern Road". The road connected the eastern region of India with Central Asia, the terminus of the Khurasan Road.

The precursor of the modern Grand Trunk road was built on the orders of the emperor Chandragupta Maurya and was inspired by the Persian Royal Road (more precisely, its eastern stretch, the Great Khurasan Road that ran from Media to Bactria). During the Mauryan times in the 3rd century BCE, overland trade between India and several parts of Western Asia and Bactria went through the cities of the north-west, primarily Takshashila and Purushapura (present-day Taxila and Peshawar respectively, in Pakistan). Takshashila was well connected by roads with other parts of the Mauryan Empire. The Mauryas had maintained this very ancient highway from Takshashila to Patliputra (present-day Patna in India). Chandragupta Maurya had a department of officials overseeing the maintenance of this road as mentioned by the Greek diplomat Megasthenes who spent fifteen years at the Mauryan court. Constructed in eight stages, this road is said to have connected the cities of Purushapura, Takshashila, Hastinapura, Kanyakubja, Prayag, Patliputra and Tamralipta, a distance of around 2,600 kilometres (1,600 mi).

The route of Chandragupta was built over the ancient "Uttarapatha" or the Northern Road, which had been mentioned by Pāṇini. The emperor Ashoka had it recorded in his edict about having trees planted, wells built at every half kos and many "nimisdhayas", which is often translated as rest-houses along the route for the travellers. The Kushan emperor Kanishka is also known to have controlled the Uttarapatha.

=== Medieval period ===
Sher Shah Suri, the ruler of the Sur Empire, repaired the Chandragupta's Royal Road in the 16th century. The old route was further rerouted at Sonargaon and Rohtas. Its breadth was increased and caravanserais, kos minars and baolis were built. Gardens were also built alongside some sections of the highway. His son Islam Shah Suri constructed an additional sarai in-between every sarai originally built by Sher Shah Suri on the road toward Bengal. More sarais were built under the Mughals. Jahangir under his reign issued a decree that all sarais be built of burnt brick and stone. Broad-leaved trees were planted in the stretch between Lahore and Agra and he built bridges over all water bodies that were situated on the path of the highways. The route was referred to as "Sadak-e-Azam" by Suri and "Badshahi Sadak" by the Mughals.

=== Modern period ===
In the 1830s the East India Company started a program of metalled road construction, for both commercial and administrative purposes. The road, now named the Grand Trunk Road, from Calcutta, through Delhi, to Kabul, Afghanistan was rebuilt at a cost of £1000/mile.

The road is mentioned in a number of literary works including those of Foster and Rudyard Kipling. Kipling described the road in Kim: "'Look! Brahmins and chumars, bankers and tinkers, barbers and bunnias, pilgrims and potters – all the world going and coming. ...' And truly the Grand Trunk Road is a wonderful spectacle. It runs straight, bearing without crowding India's traffic for fifteen hundred miles – such a river of life as nowhere else exists in the world."

==== Republic of India ====
The ensemble of historic sites along the road in India was submitted to the tentative list of UNESCO World Heritage Sites in 2015, under the title "Sites along the Uttarapath, Badshahi Sadak, Sadak-e-Azam, Banho, Grand Trunk Road". A section of this Road is mapped in a 2026 in a Punjab GIS-based study. The Indian sections of the Grand Trunk Road coincide with NH 19, NH 112 and NH 44 of the National Highways in India.

Psephologists sometimes refer to the area around the GT Road as the "GT Road belt" it is also known as Gujarat road sometimes within the context of elections. For example, during the elections in Haryana the area on either side of the GT Road from Ambala to Sonipat, which has 28 legislative assembly constituencies where there is no dominance of one caste or community, is referred to as the "GT road belt of Haryana".

==== Islamic Republic of Pakistan ====
The road coincides with the current N-5 (Lahore, Gujranwala, Gujrat, Lalamusa, Kharian, Jhelum, Rawalpindi, Peshawar and Khyber Pass towards Jalalabad in Afghanistan) in Pakistan and AH1 (Torkham-Jalalabad to Kabul) to Ghazni in Afghanistan.

Part of the highway was built on the ancient Grand Trunk Road (commonly known as G.T. Road) which came under jurisdiction of the new state after the independence of Pakistan in 1947. The historical Grand Trunk Route extended from Wagha, Punjab to Peshawar, Khyber Pakhtunkhwa. The original highways were Peshawar-Torkham Road, Grand Trunk Road (Peshawar-Lahore), Lahore-Multan Road, Multan-Bahawalpur Road, KLP Road (Bahawalpur-Rahim Yar Khan), Karachi-Rahim Yar Khan Road.

The federal government has approved a major upgrade of the Grand Trunk (G.T.) Road (N-5) for conversion into a uniform three-lane carriageway.

== Route ==
The road coincides with the current N1 (Chittagong to Dhaka), N4 & N405 (Dhaka to Sirajganj), N507 (Sirajganj to Natore) and N6 (Natore to Rajshahi towards Purnea in India) in Bangladesh; NH 12 (Purnea to Kolkata), NH 19 (Kolkata to Agra), NH 44 (Agra to Jalandhar via New Delhi, Panipat, Karnal, Ambala and Ludhiana) and NH 3 (Jalandhar to Attari, Amritsar in India towards Lahore in Pakistan via Wagah) in India; N-5 (Lahore, Gujranwala, Gujrat, Lalamusa, Kharian, Jhelum, Rawalpindi, Peshawar and Khyber Pass towards Jalalabad in Afghanistan) in Pakistan and AH1 (Torkham-Jalalabad to Kabul) to Ghazni in Afghanistan.

== Gallery ==
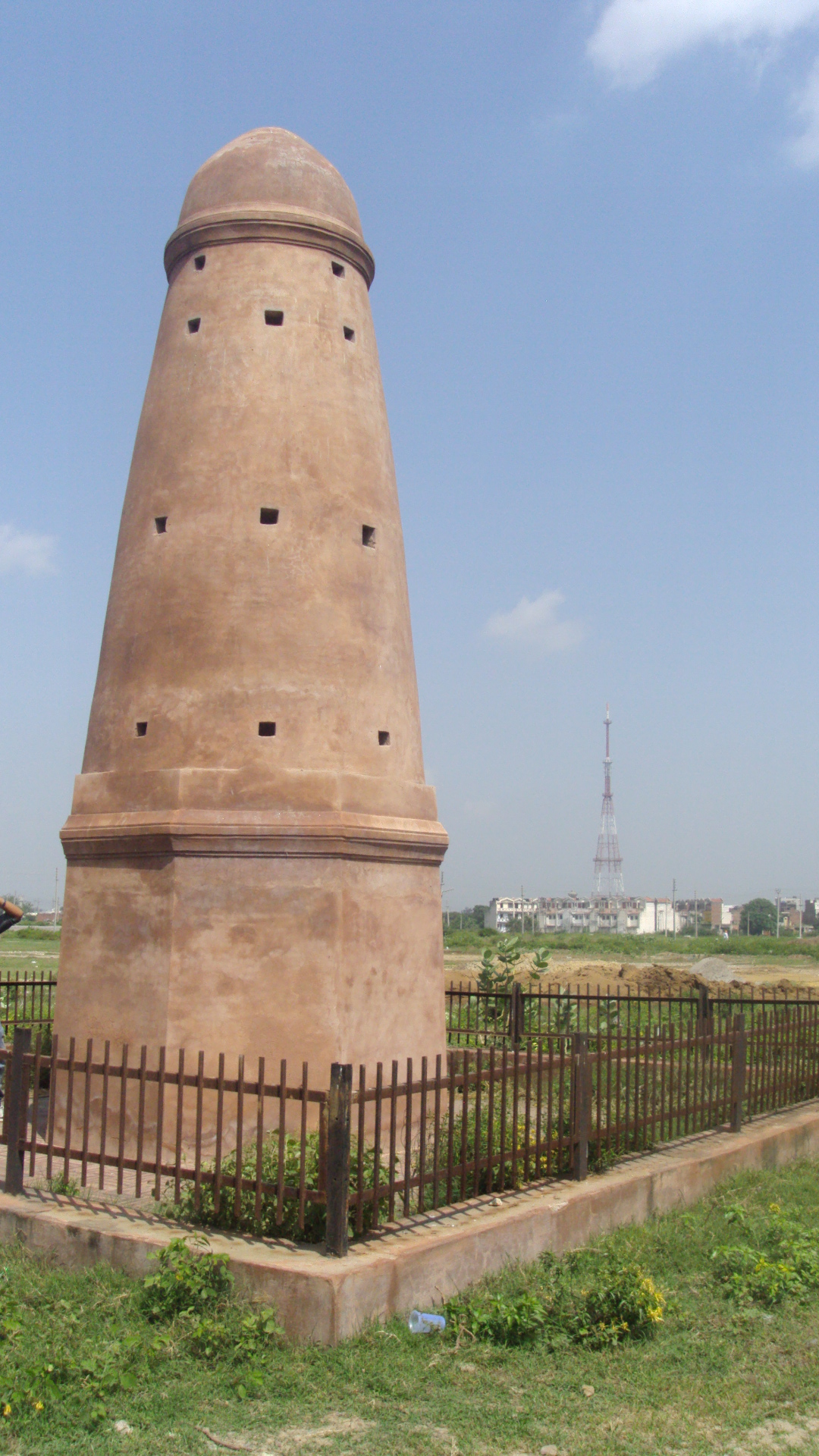
Mughal era Kos Minar along GT road at Sonipat, India

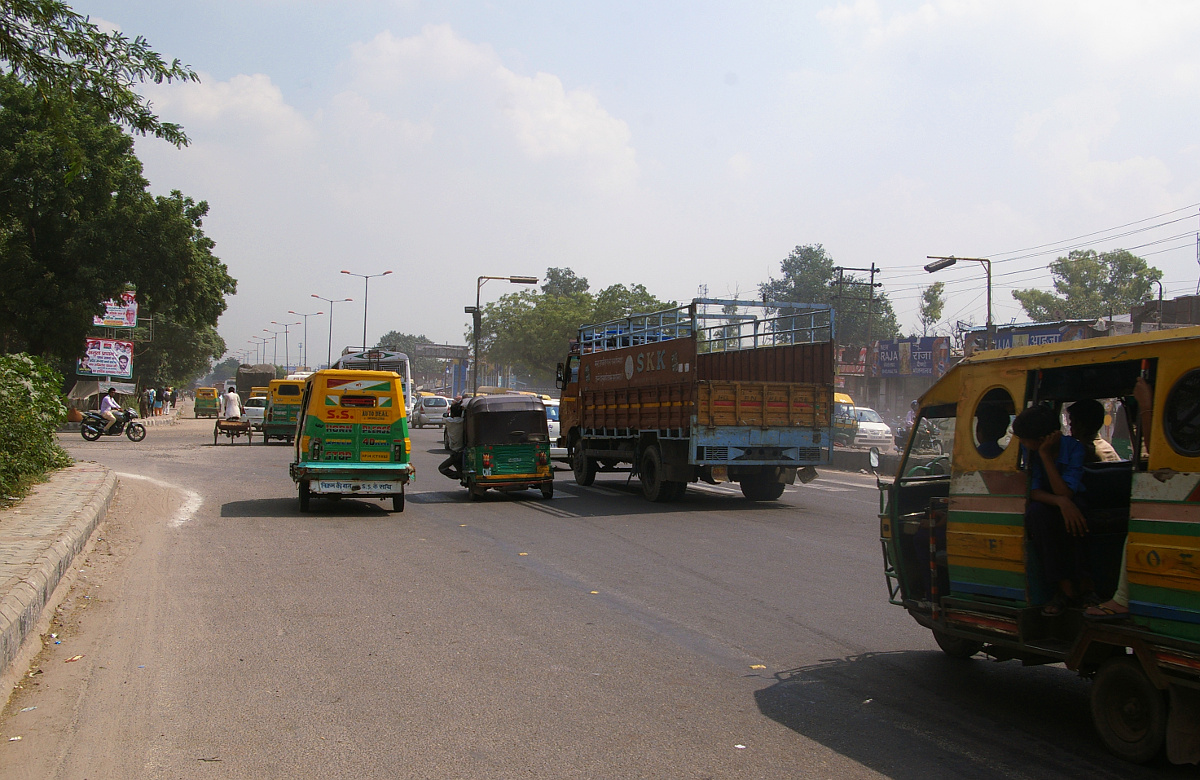
Grand Trunk Road in Uttar Pradesh, India

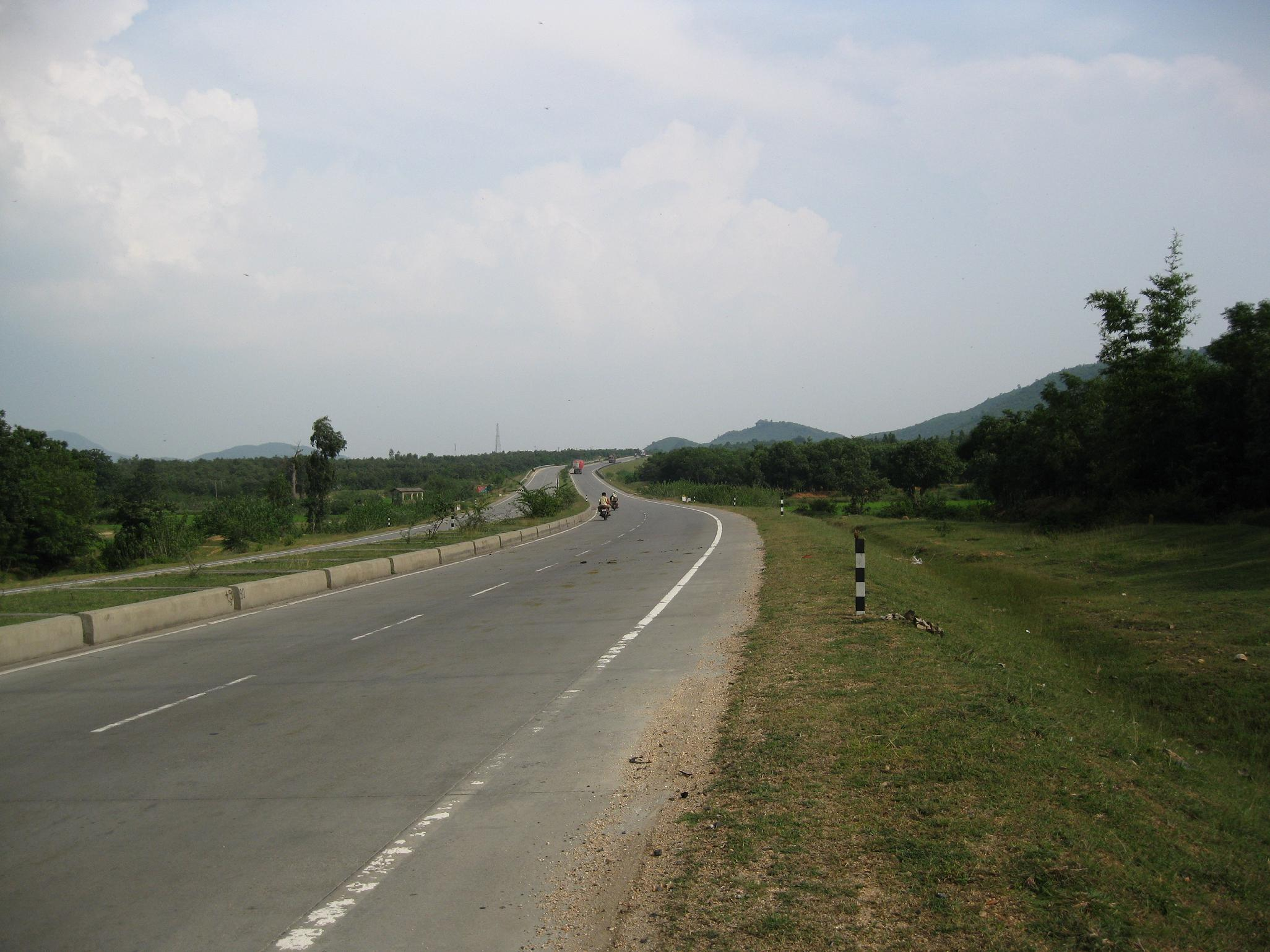
GT Road near Barhi, India

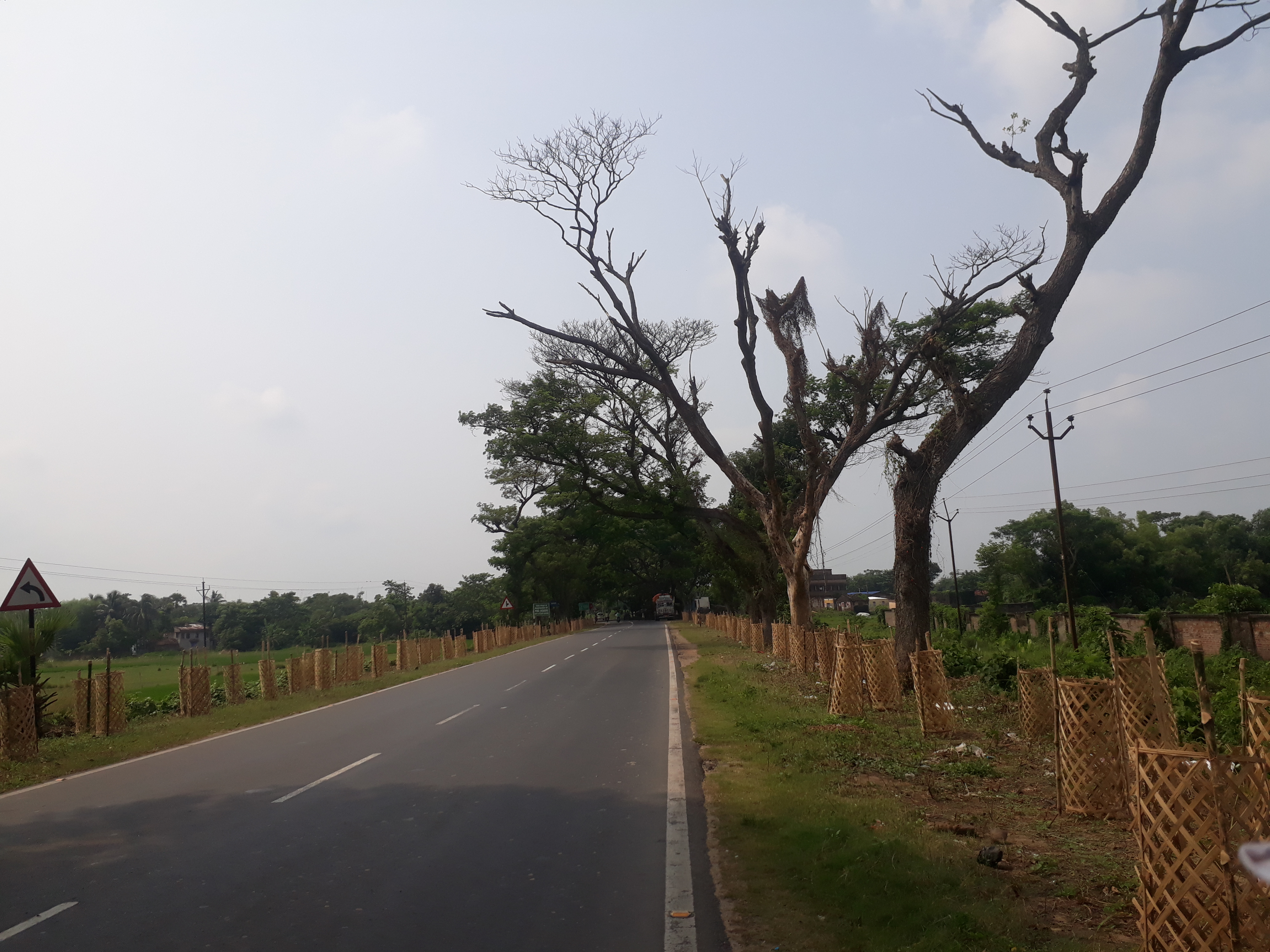
Grand Trunk Road towards Burdwan from Hooghly

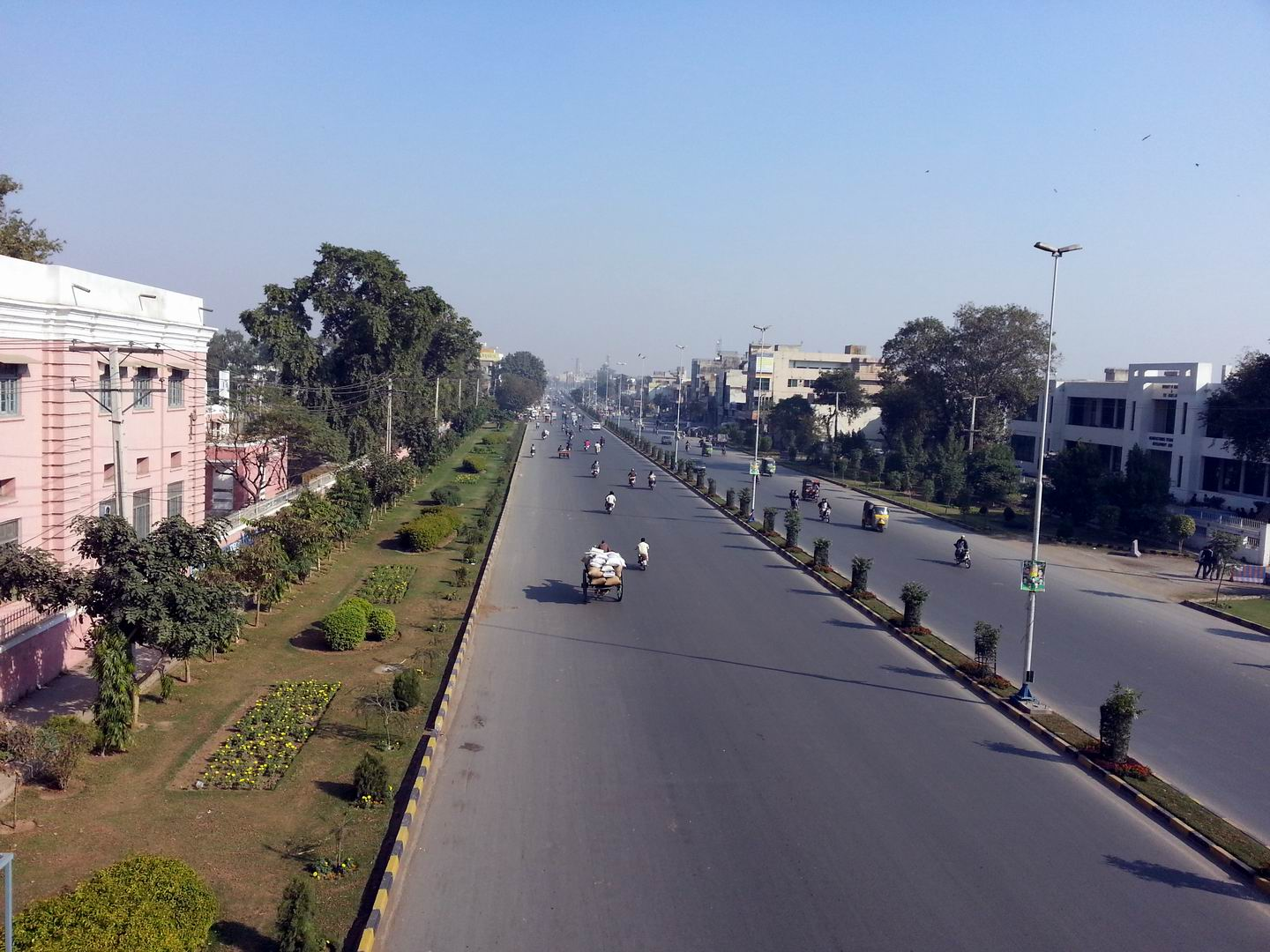
GT Road in Lahore, Pakistan

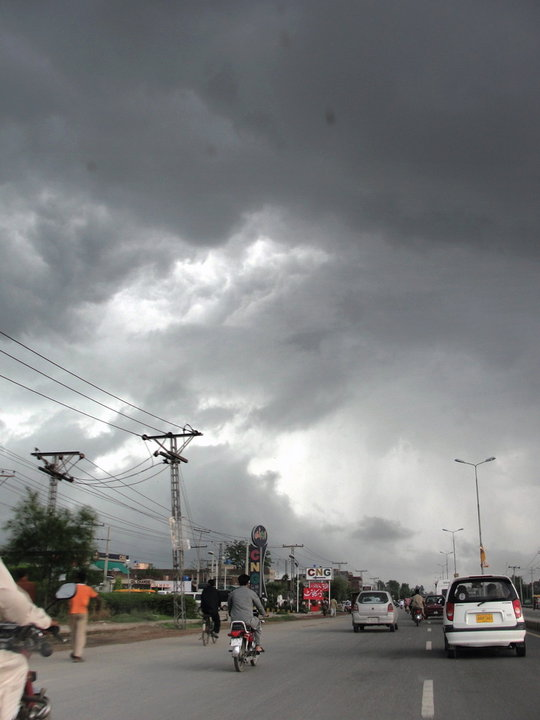
GT road in Gujranwala, Pakistan

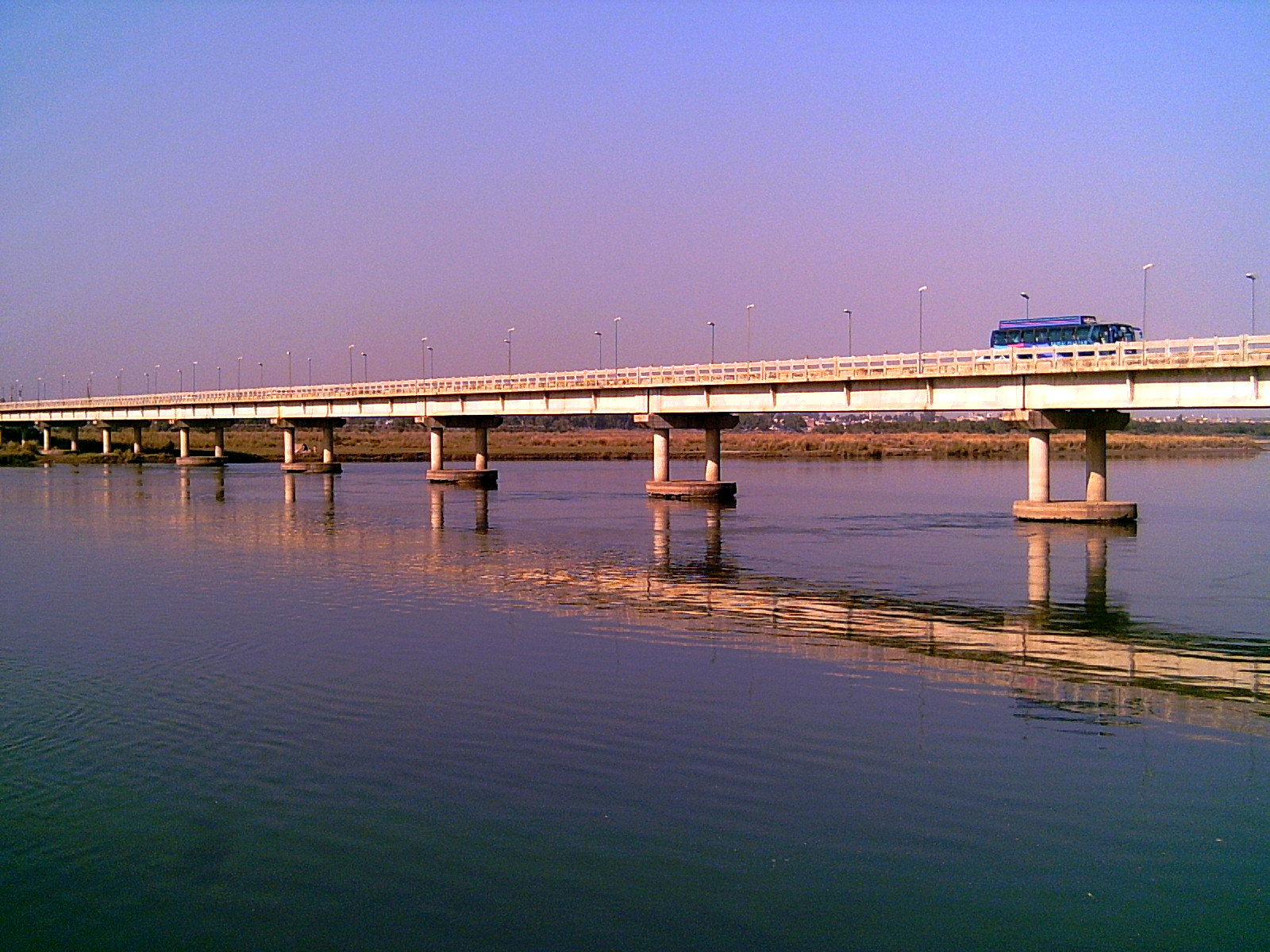
GT Road above the River Jhelum, Pakistan

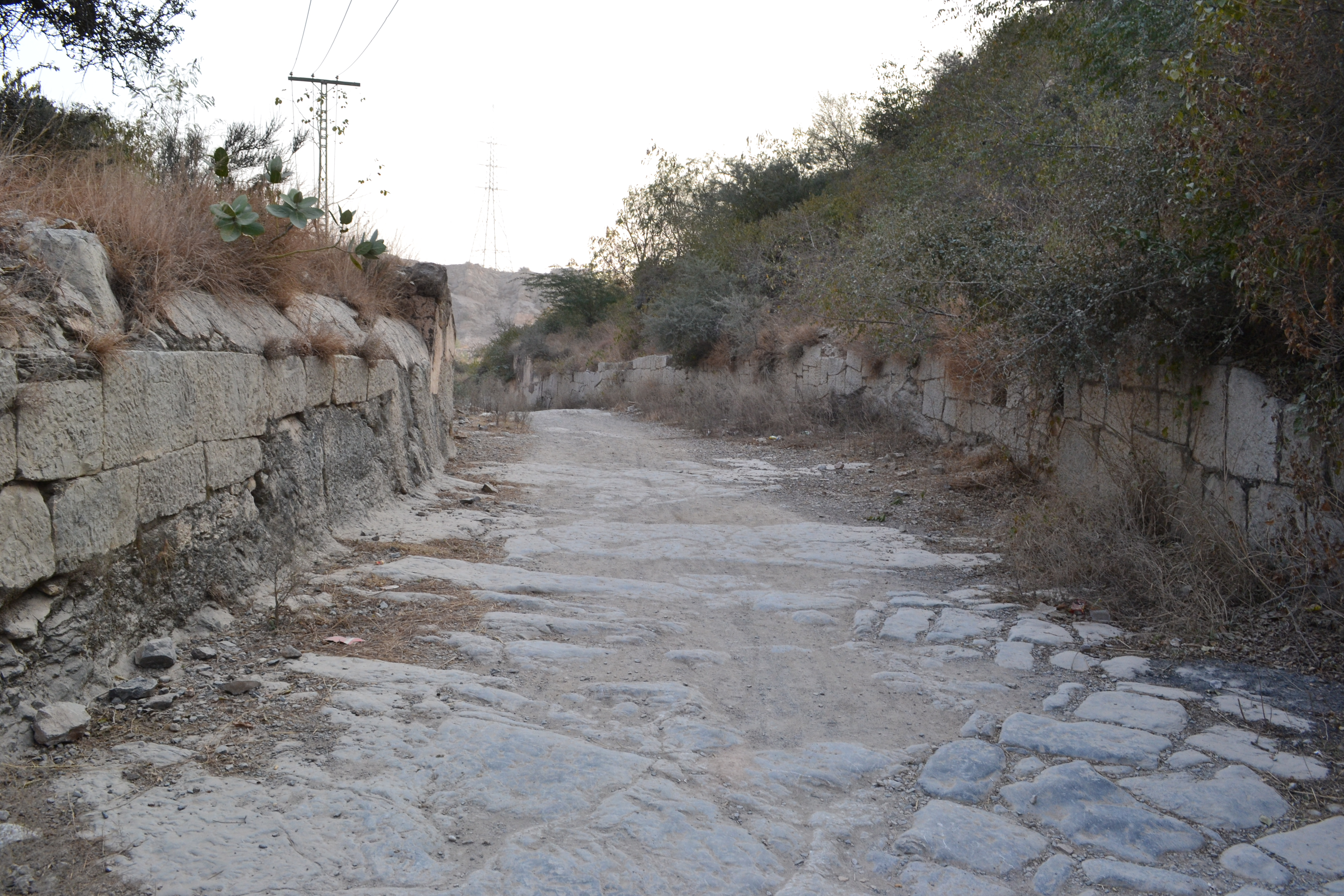
Original GT Road passing through Margalla Hills to Kala Chitta Range, Pakistan

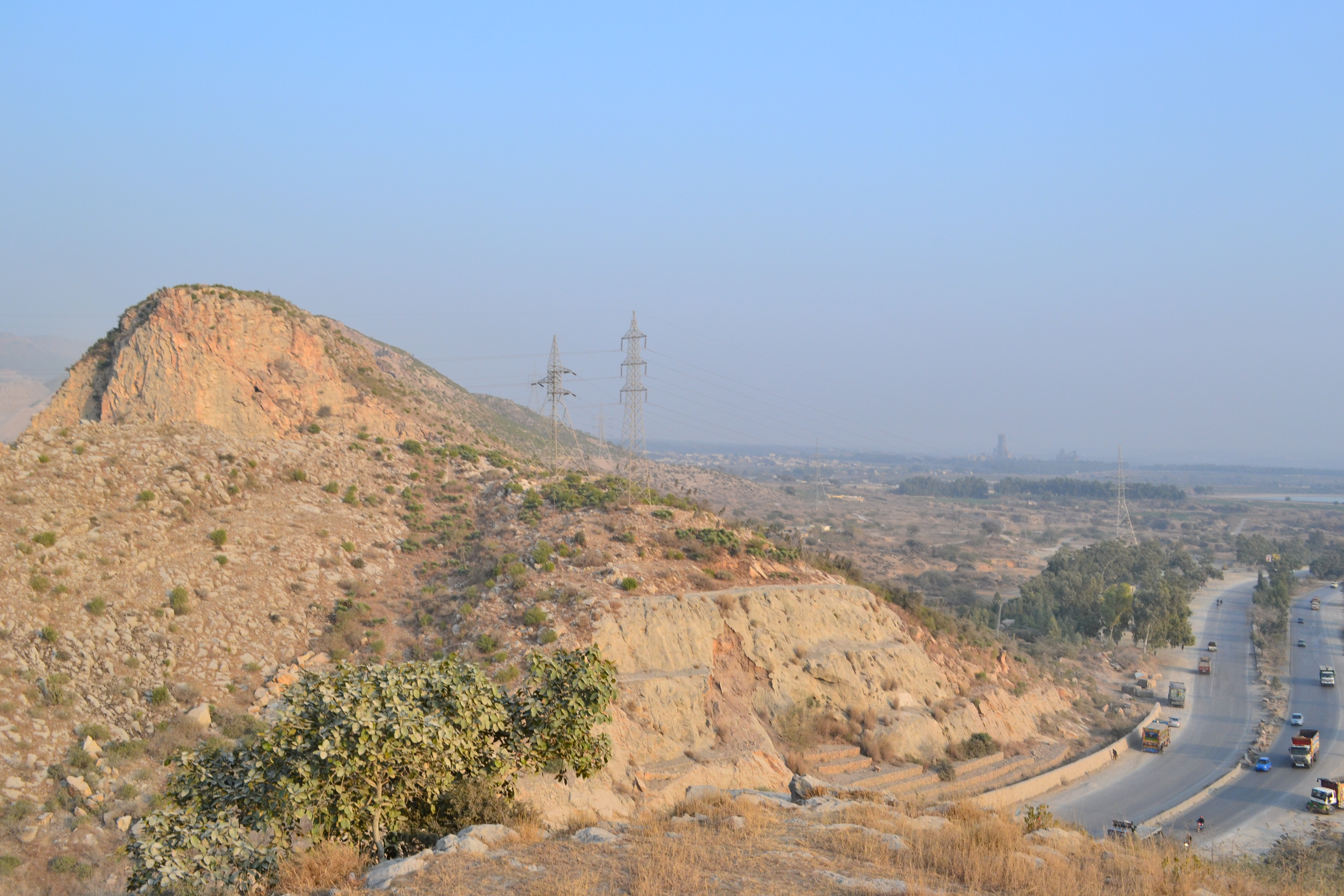
Newly realigned GT Road passing by the westernmost point of Margalla Hills to Kala Chitta Range, Pakistan

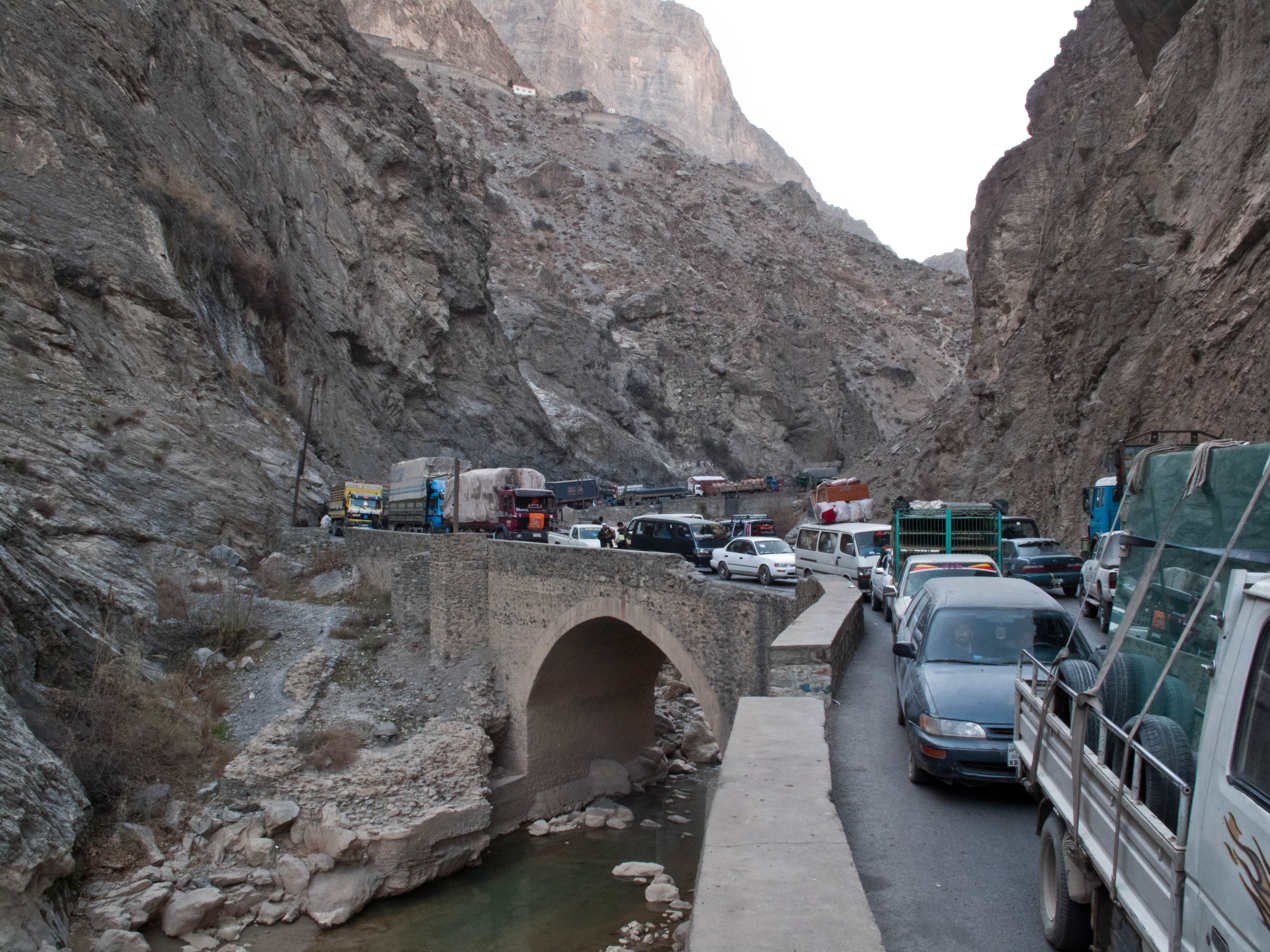
Kabul–Jalalabad Road, Afghanistan, is the westernmost stretch of the GT Road.

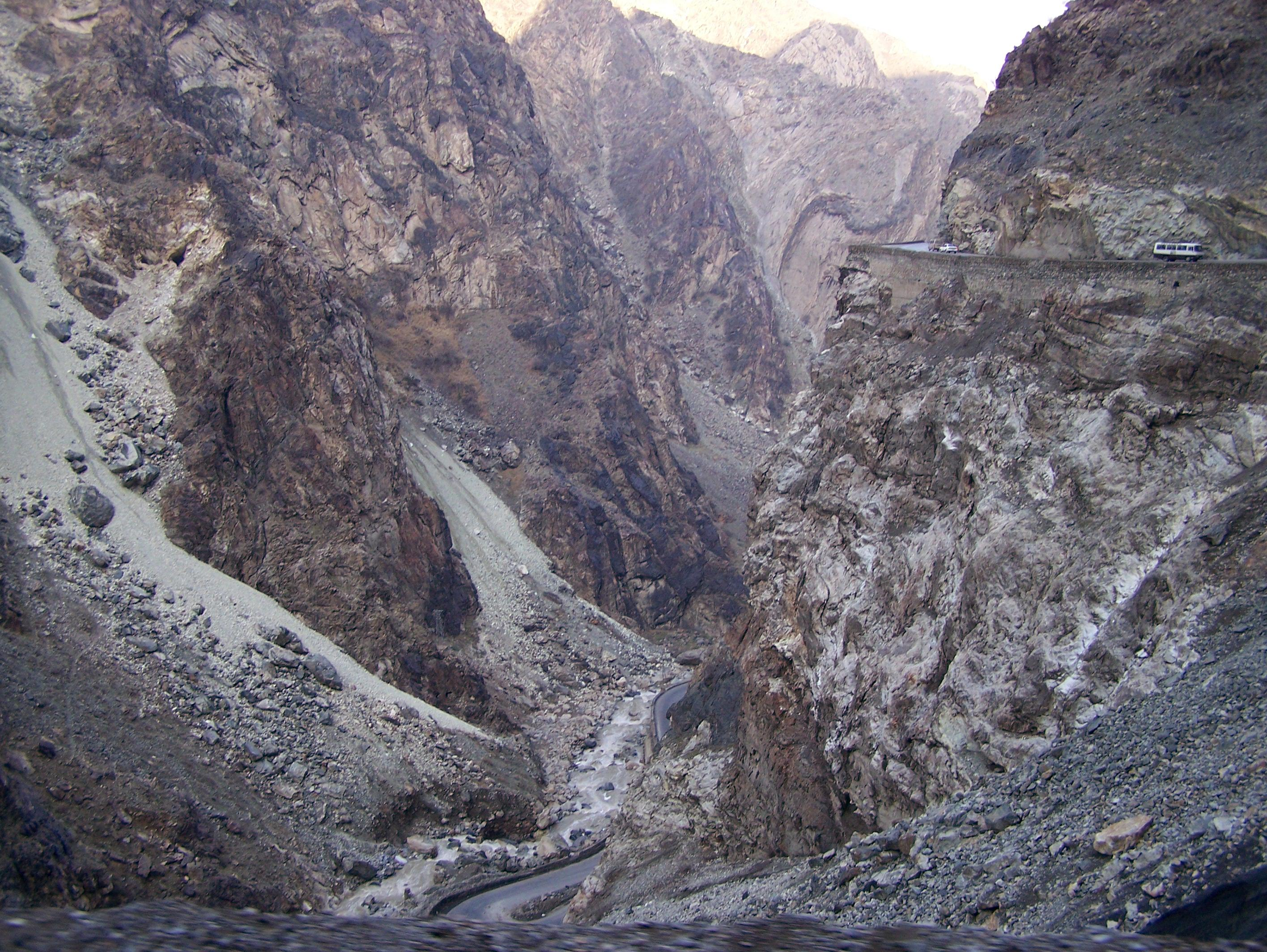
Mountain pass on the Kabul–Jalalabad Road, Afghanistan

== See also ==
- Royal Road
- Roman roads
- Via Regia
- Silk Road – ancient Sino-Indo-European route
- Via Maris (International Trunk Road) – modern name of the main ancient international route between Egypt and Mesopotamia

=== Modern roads in Asia ===
- AH1, or Asian Highway 1 – the longest route of the Asian Highway Network, running from Japan to Turkey
- Asian Highway Network (AH), aka the Great Asian Highway - project to improve the highway systems in Asia

Afghanistan

- Highway 1 (Afghanistan) – 2,200 km (1,400 mi) circular road network inside Afghanistan

Pakistan

- National Highways of Pakistan, all government highways
- Motorways of Pakistan – network of major expressways

India

- National highways in India – network of government-managed highways
- Expressways in India – the highest class of roads in the Indian road network
- Golden Quadrilateral – highway network connecting major centres of northern, western, southern and eastern India
- National Highways Development Project – a project to upgrade and widen major highways in India
- National Highways Authority of India
