= AH41 =

Road in Asia

Asian Highway 41

Route information
- Length: 948 km (589 mi)

Major junctions
- East end: Teknaf, Cox's Bazar
- West end: Mongla, Bagerhat

Location
- Countries: Bangladesh

Highway system
- Asian Highway Network
← AH40	→ AH42

Asian Highway 41 (AH41) is a route of the Asian Highway Network, running 948 kilometres (589 mi) from Teknaf in Chittagong Division, Bangladesh to Mongla in Khulna Division, Bangladesh.

It passes only through Bangladesh to provide connectivity between the ports of Chittagong and Mongla – the two busiest seaports of Bangladesh. It also shares some portions with the two longest routes of the Asian Highway Network – the AH1 and AH2.

== Bangladesh ==
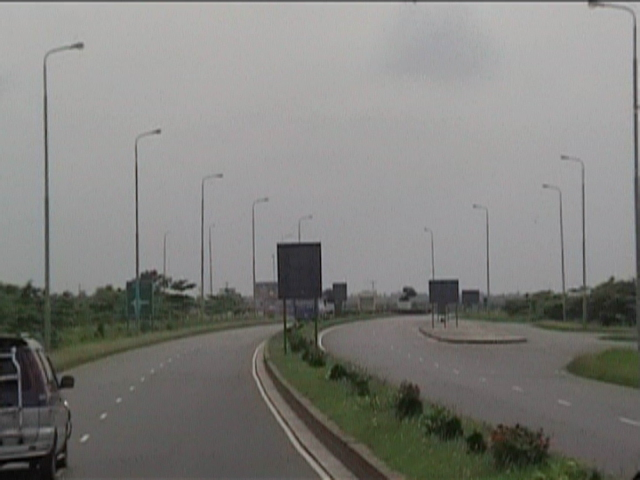
AH2 and AH41 near Bangabandhu Bridge, Jamuna River, Bangladesh

- N1: Teknaf — Cox's Bazar — Chittagong — Feni — Comilla — Dhaka
- N3: Dhaka — Joydebpur
- N4: Joydebpur — Tangail — Elenga
- N405: Elenga — Hatikumrul
- N507: Hatikumrul — Bonpara
- N6: Bonpara — Dasuria
- N704: Dasuria — Kushtia — Jhenaidah
- N7: Jhenaidah — Jashore — Khulna — Mongla
