= Hatikumrul Interchange =

Major road junction in Bangladesh

- Hatikumrul Roundabout
- Interactive map of Hatikumrul Interchange

Location
- Hatikumrul, Salanga Thana Sirajganj District, Bangladesh
- Coordinates: 24.419218°N 89.551712°E
- Roads at junction: Dhaka–North Bengal Highway; Dhaka- Rajshahi Highway; Dhaka–Pabna highway; Dhaka–Rangpur highway

Construction
- Type: Cloverleaf interchange
- Opened: 16 December 2026
- Maintained by: Road Transport and Highways Division

Hatikumrul Interchange (Bengali: হাতিকুমরুল ইন্টারচেঞ্জ), also known as Hatikumrul Roundabout (Bengali: হাতিকুমরুল গোলচত্বর), is a major under-construction road interchange in Hatikumrul Union, Sirajganj District, Bangladesh which consists of a cloverstack interchange.

== History ==
The Road Transport and Highways Division started construction of an international standard interchange at this important hub of the highway under the SASEC-2 project in 2022 to reduce traffic congestion. The Chinese contractor, China Railway Construction Bridge Engineering Company, is working on this project. The cost has been estimated at 7.43 billions Bangladeshi taka. The first year was spent resolving the complexities of the land acquisition process. In May 2024, it was said that the project would be completed in December 2025. According to various recent news reports, the construction work on this interchange will be completed in December 2026.

== See also ==
- Bhanga Interchange
