= N405 (Bangladesh) =

National highway in Bangladesh

N405
- Dhaka-North Bengal Highway; Dhaka-Rajshahi Highway; Dhaka-Rangpur Highway; Elenga-Nalka-Hatikamrul Road; Jamuna Bridge Approach Road

Route information
- Part of AH2
- Length: 40.782 km (25.341 mi)

Major junctions
- From: N4 in Elenga
- To: N507 / N5 in Hatikumrul Interchange

Location
- Country: Bangladesh

Highway system
- Roads in Bangladesh
← N404	→ N406

Dhaka-North Bengal Highway or simply Elenga-Nalka-Hatikamrul Road is a national highway which connects Elenga, a town in Tangail district to Hatikumrul Interchange. The 40.782-kilometre (25.341 mi) highway was also known as the Jamuna Bridge approach Road. This highway plays an important role for regional and national connectivity in the western region.

== History ==
This road was built as a pilot project of Jamuna Bridge in 1998. For this reason the road is also known as Jamuna Bridge Approach Road.
