= N3 (Bangladesh) =

National Highway in Bangladesh

N3
- Dhaka–Mymensingh Highway
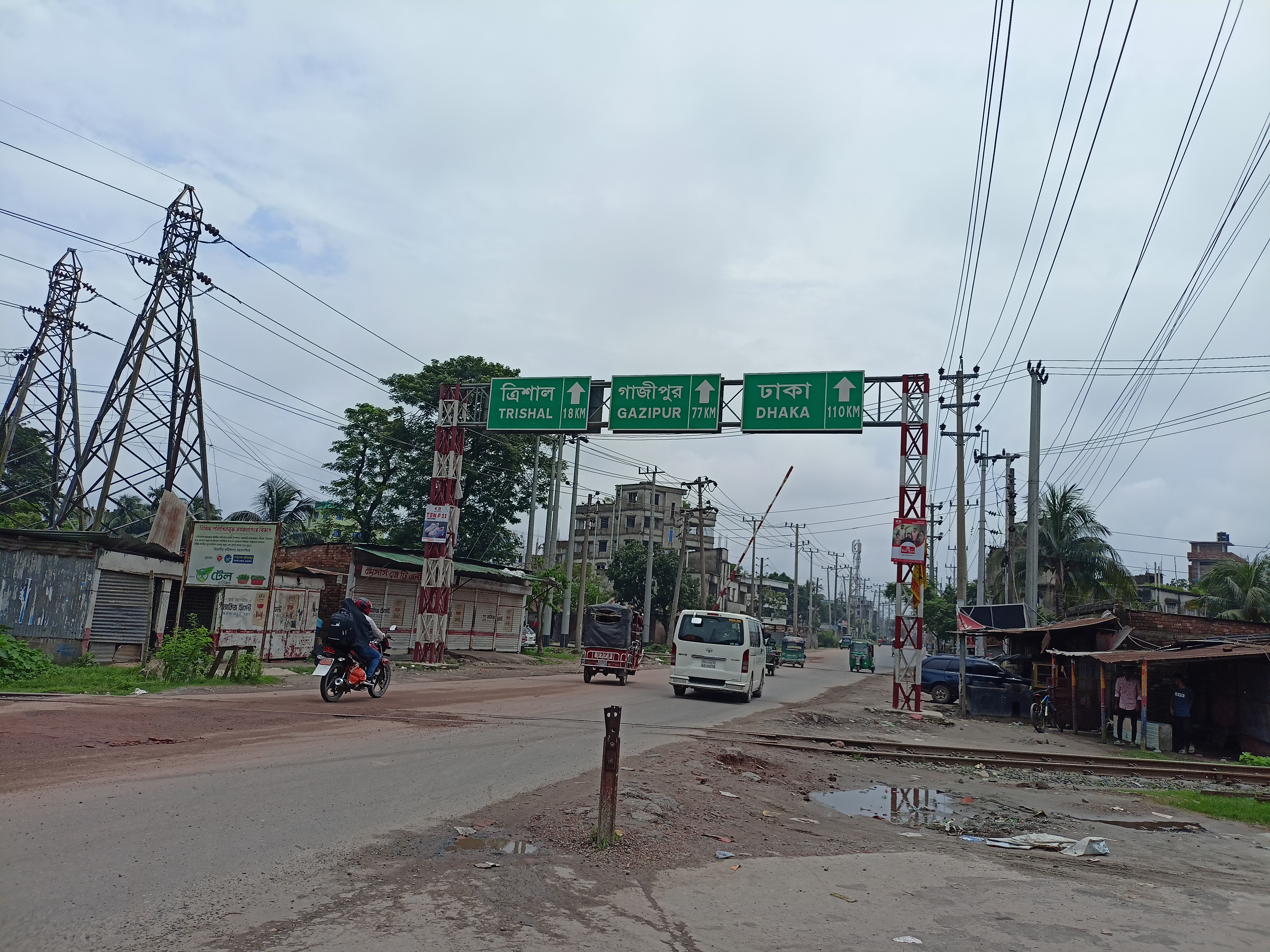

Route information
- Part of AH2 AH41
- Length: 115 km (71 mi)

Location
- Country: Bangladesh

Highway system
- Roads in Bangladesh
| ← N2 | → N4 |

The N3 or Dhaka–Mymensingh Highway is a national highway in Bangladesh. It connects the Bangladeshi capital city of Dhaka with the city of Mymensingh in the north, on the bank of the Brahmaputra River.

The N3 is part of Asian Highway 41 (AH41), a route of the Asian Highway Network.

== Junction list ==
This route is in Dhaka Division and Mymensingh Division.

| Location | km | Mile | Destinations | Notes |
|---|---|---|---|---|
| Dhaka | 0km | 0mi | Banani | |
| Tongi | 9km | 5.6mi | N501 | |
| Joydebpur | 21km | 13mi | N4 / N105 | |
| Rajendrapur | 36km | 22.4mi | R314 | |
| Mawna | 54km | 33.6mi | | |
| Mymensingh | 112km | 69.6mi | N309 | |
