= N502 (Bangladesh) =

National highway in Bangladesh

N502
- Bogura - Natore Highway

Route information
- Length: 63 km (39 mi)

Major junctions
- From: N6 in Madrasa Mor
- To: N5 in Bogura C & B Park Square

Location
- Country: Bangladesh

Highway system
- Roads in Bangladesh
| ← N501 | → N503 |

N502 or Bogura - Natore Highway is a national highway. It starts at Bogura C&B Park Square and ends at Madrasa Mor. This 63 km national highway connects Bogura with Natore and Rajshahi and South Bengal Districts. It plays an important role for regional and national connectivity in the western region.
