= N510 (Bangladesh) =

Road in Bangladesh

N510
- College Road

Route information
- Length: 3 km (1.9 mi)

Major junctions
- Bogura city end: Sath Matha interchange
- N514 - Sath Matha; N5 - Tin Matha Intersection
- Bogura end: Tin Matha Intersection

Location
- Country: Bangladesh

Highway system
- Roads in Bangladesh
← N509	→ N511

N510 or College Road is short national highway connecting two national highways N514 with N5 and Bogura city with Bogura City Bypass.
