= Salanga Thana =

Police Station in Rajshahi, Bangladesh

Salanga Thana সলঙ্গা থানা
- Police Station
- Location in Bangladesh
- Country: Bangladesh
- Division: Rajshahi Division
- District: Sirajganj District
- Established: 2001

Area
  - Total: 167.46 km^{2} (64.66 sq mi)

Population
  - Total: 244,953
  - Density: 1,462.8/km^{2} (3,788.5/sq mi)
- Time zone: UTC+6 (BST)
- Postal code: 6721 & 6760

Salanga Thana is a police station of Bangladesh Police. The police station was established on 2001. The police station justification lies between 3 & 3 unions of Ullapara and Raiganj of Sirajganj District.

== History ==
The Salanga Union Parishad established during the British period. In 1922, an anti-British movement was organized in Salanga, known as the Salanga Movement or Salanga massacre. Abdur Rashid Tarkabagish led this movement.

Later, in 2001, Salanga Thana was formed with 3 union parishads of Ullahpara Upazila and 3 union parishads of Raiganj Upazila of Sirajganj District.

The people of Salanga Thana have been demanding the establishment of Salanga Upazila. For this, they hold human chain programs at different times. An organization named Salanga Society organizes all these programs.

== Administration ==
There are six unions under this police station. Half of them are under justification of Ullapara Upazila and another half are from Raiganj Upazila. They are ;

=== Ullapara Upazila ===
- Hatikumrul Union
- Salanga Union
- Ramkrisnapur Union

=== Raiganj Upazila ===
- Ghurka Union
- Dhubil Union
- Nalka Union
