= N507 (Bangladesh) =

National highway in Bangladesh

N507
- Dhaka-Rajshahi Highway; Banpara-Hatikamrul Road

Route information
- Length: 51.262 km (31.853 mi)

Major junctions
- From: N6 in Banpara
- R604 - Hamkuria Bazar
- To: N405 / N5 in Hatikumrul Interchange

Location
- Country: Bangladesh

Highway system
- National highways of Bangladesh
| ← N506 | → N508 |

Dhaka-Rajshahi Highway or simply Banpara-Hatikamrul Road is a national highway which connects Banpara, a town in Natore district to Hatikumrul Interchange.The 51.262-kilometre (31.853 mi) highway was also known as the Rajshahi- Sirajganj Road. This highway plays an important role for regional and national connectivity in the western region.
