= Bonpara =

Municipal corporation in Bangladesh

Coordinates: 24.2904°N 89.0820°E

Bonpara is a municipality (paurashava) in Baraigram Upazila of Natore District in north-western Bangladesh. It has a total population of around 22867.

== History ==
Catholic Christian missionaries in the Bhawal region cleared the woods and founded human settlements in the late 1920s. Because of the abundance of woods, it is called Bonpara. Initially, only Christians lived in this neighborhood, but other faiths eventually moved in. At the moment, all faiths may be found here. Bonpara was incorporated as a municipality on December 31, 2002.

== At a glance ==
Particular	Details
Established	31/12/2002
Category	"B" Category
Area	6.92 sq km
Number of Wards	9
Total Population	22,867
Male	11,375
Female	11,492
Total Voter	13,853
Male	6,627
Female	6,989
Literacy Rate	74%
Birth Registration Rate	100%
Sanitation Rate	100%
Employed	26%
Businessmen and Others	29%
Agriculturists	45%
Birth Rate	1.67%
Death Rate	0.84%

== Educational institutions ==
Type	Number
Colleges/Universities	2
Higher Secondary Schools	3
Technical Colleges	1
Government Primary Schools	4
Non-Government Primary Schools	3
Madrasahs	9

== Religious institutions ==
Type	Number
Mosques	27
Temples	7
Churches	2
Graveyards	11
Crematoriums	3
Eidgah	12

== Other institutions ==
Type	Number
Upazila Parishad	1
Highway Thana	1
Police Investigation Center	1
Non-Government Hospitals	5
Charitable/Mission Hospitals	1
Petrol Pumps	1
NGOs	7
Telephone Exchanges	1
Auto Rice Mills	1
Chicken Feed Mills	1
Rice Mills	26
Sawmills	14
Shaheed Dr. Ayonul Haque Foundation	1

== Roads and drains ==
Type	Length (km)
RHD Roads	8.4
Unpaved Roads	77
Paved Roads	6.10
Semi-paved Roads	10.50
Total Roads	102
Unpaved Drains	1.670
Paved Drains	0.330
Total	2.00

== Holding numbers ==
Type	Number
Municipal Holdings	4,881
Government Holdings	16
Residential Holdings	4,400
Commercial Holdings	445
Cultivated Land Area	1,384 acres
Uncultivated Land Area	913 acres
Municipal Land Ownership:	41%

== Markets and utilities ==
Type	Number
Markets	1
Municipal Supplied Tubewells	92

== Staff and Employees ==
Type	Number
Permanent	22
Temporary	2
Community Police	3
Cleaning Staff	5
Banks/Insurance	8
Christian Mission	1
Non-Government Markets	13
Residential Hotels	1
Ponds	32
River (Canal)	1

== Baraigram upazila chairman murder ==
Sanaullah Noor Babu, the chairman of Baraigram upazila, was murdered on October 8, 2010.

== Sunil Gomes murder ==
On June 5, 2016, Sunil Gomes was killed at his grocery store.

== Photo gallery ==
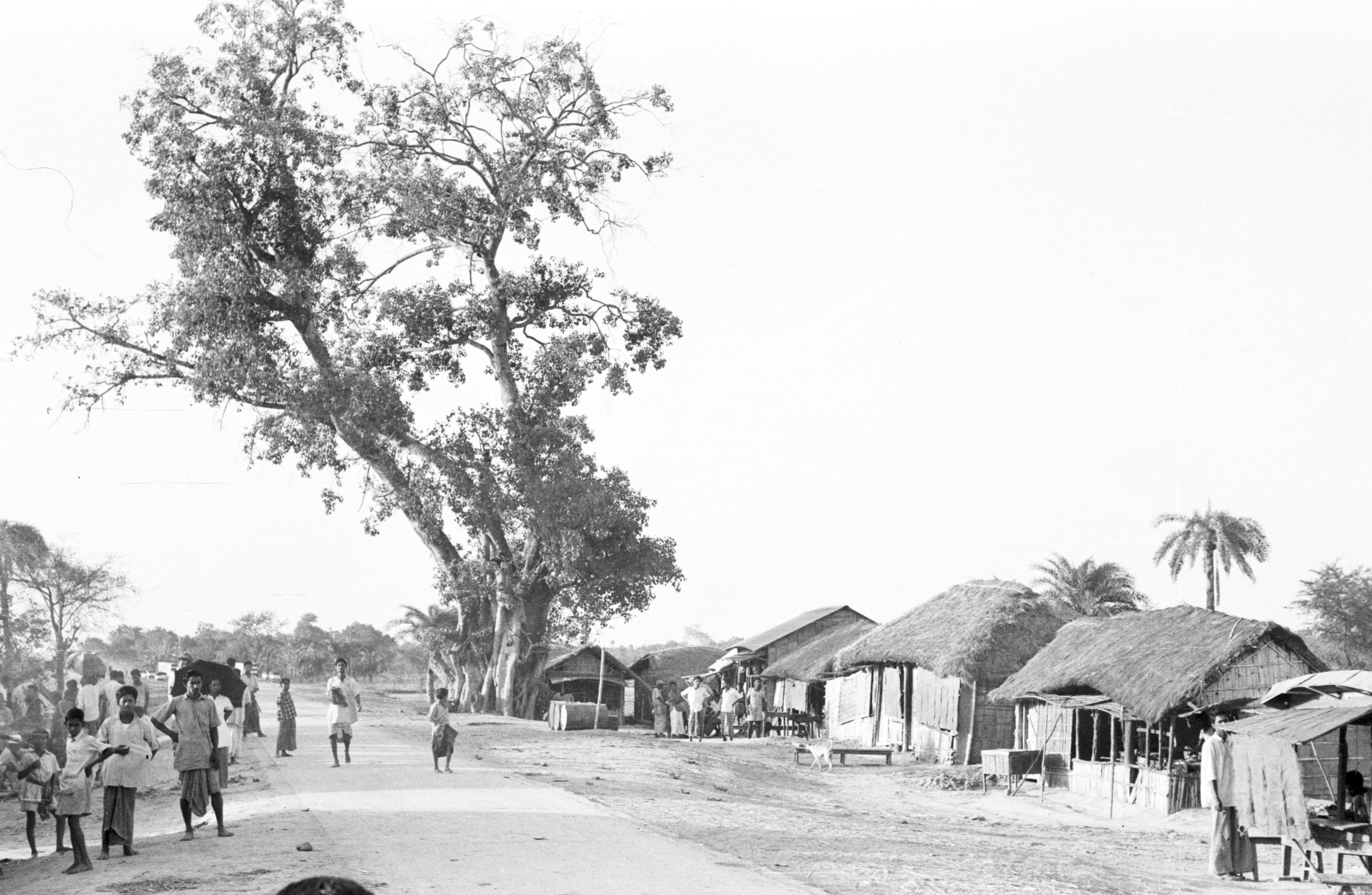
Bonpara bazar, 1965

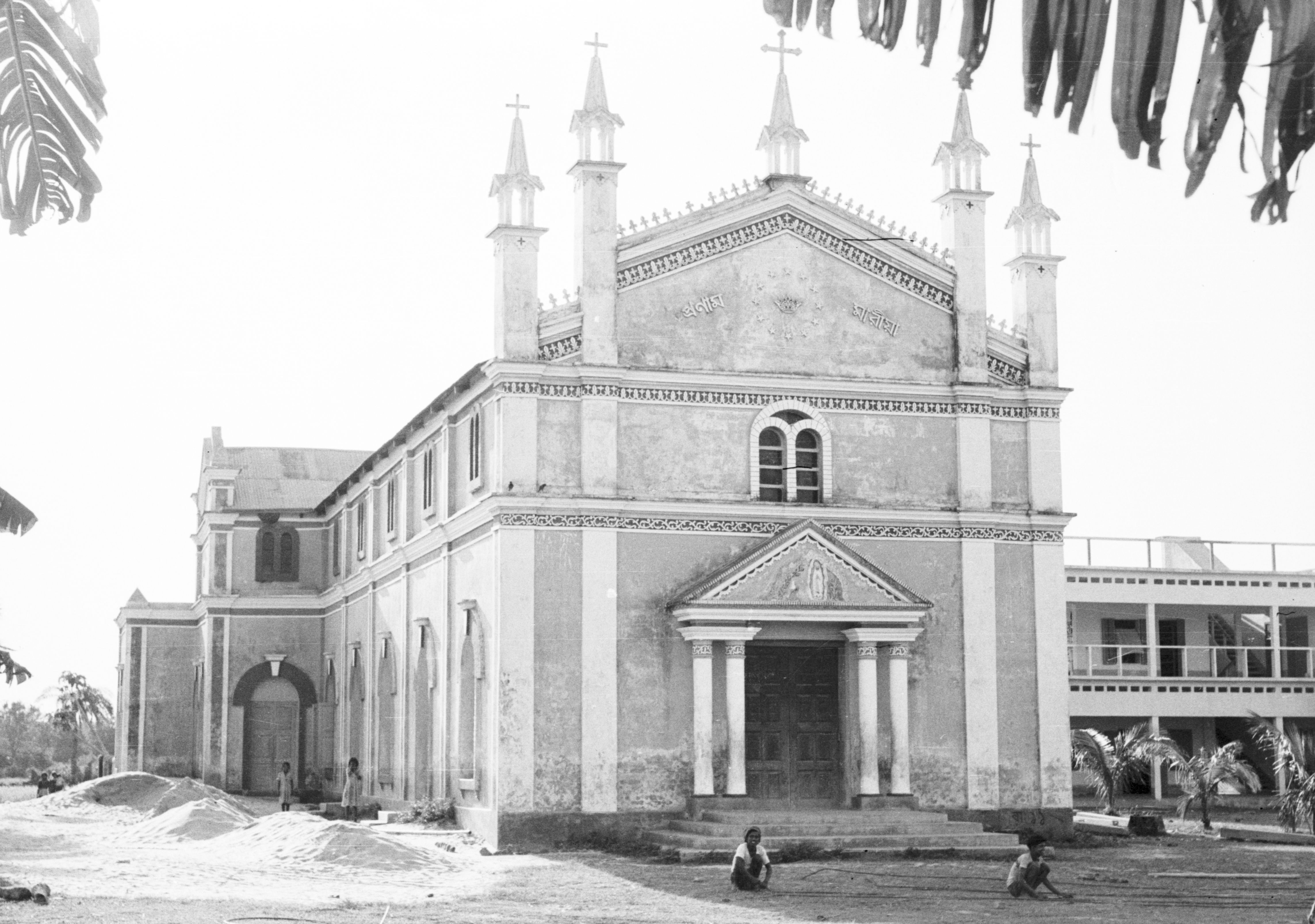
Church of Our Lady of Lourdes, Bonpara, 1965

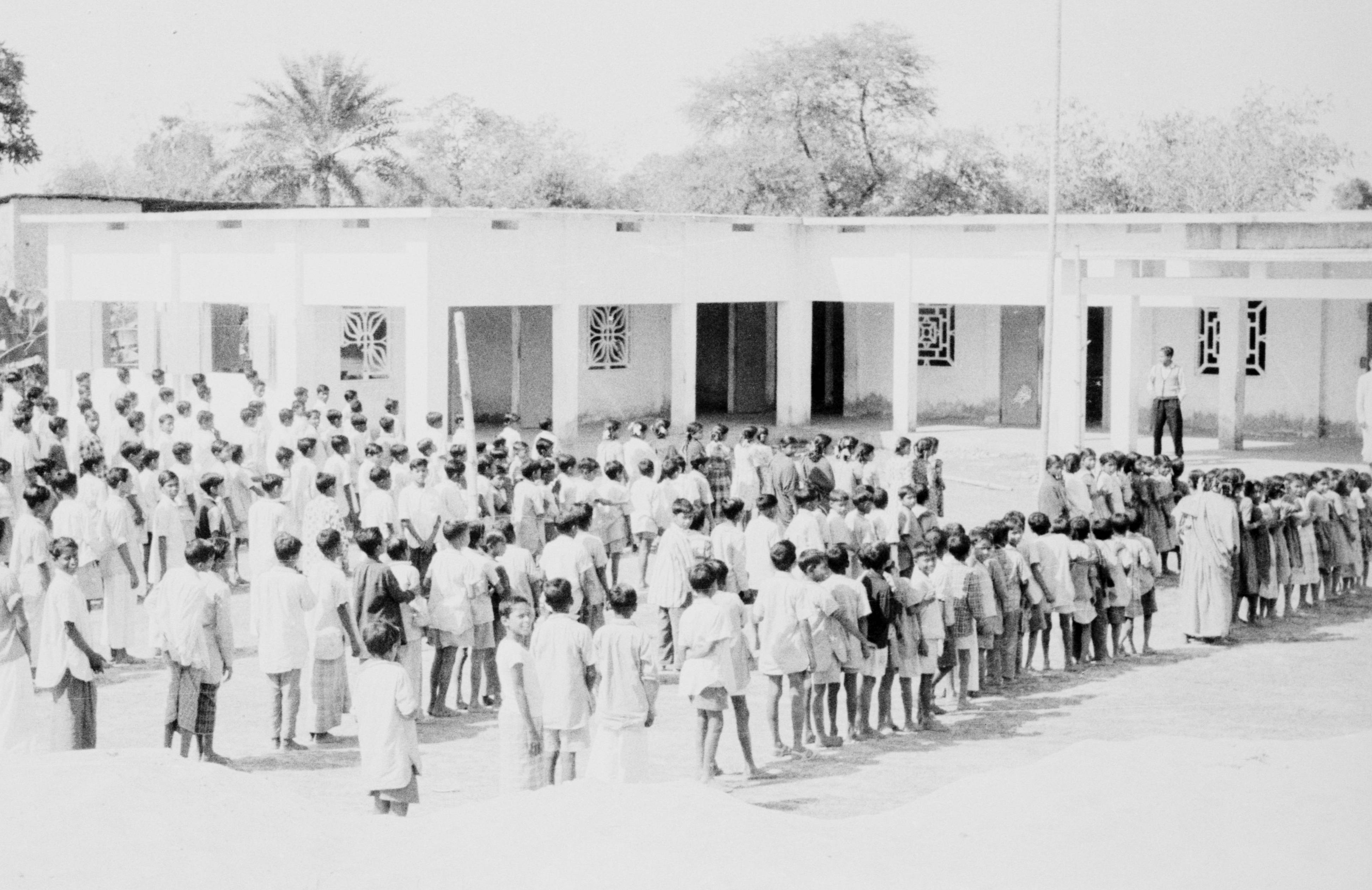
St Josephs High School, Bonpara, 1965

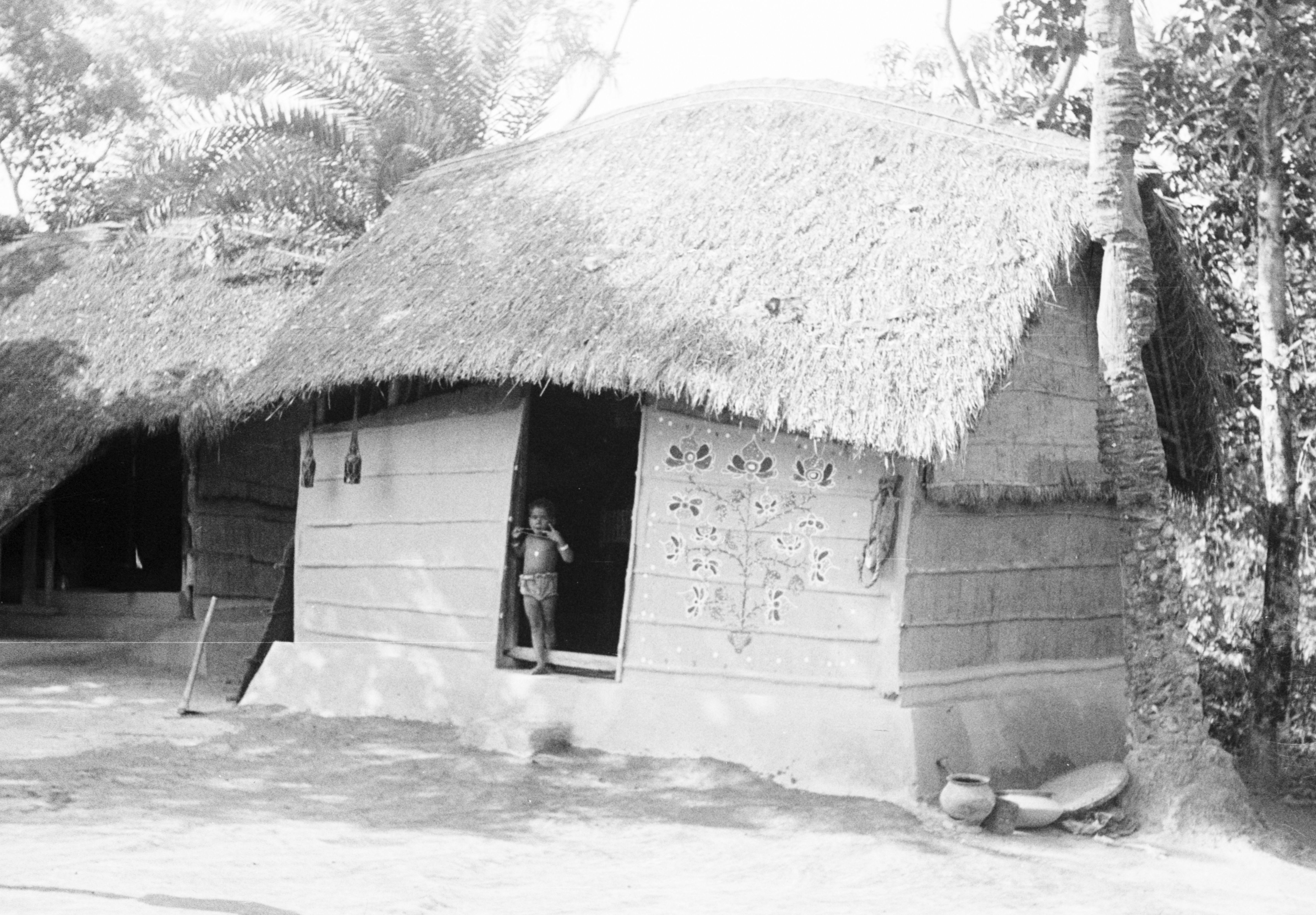
"Kacha ghor" bedroom hut in Bonpara, 1966

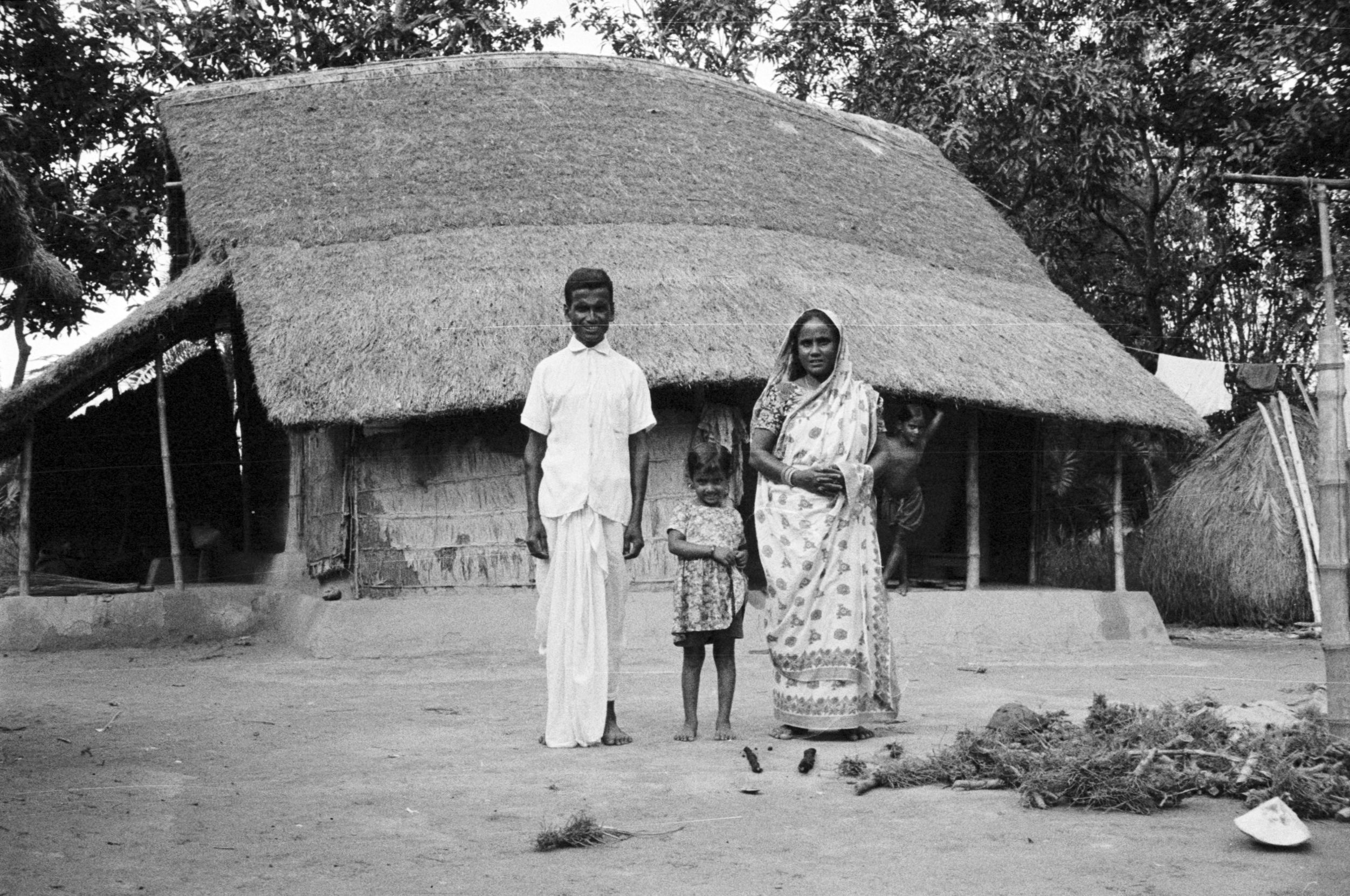
Young couple at home, 1966

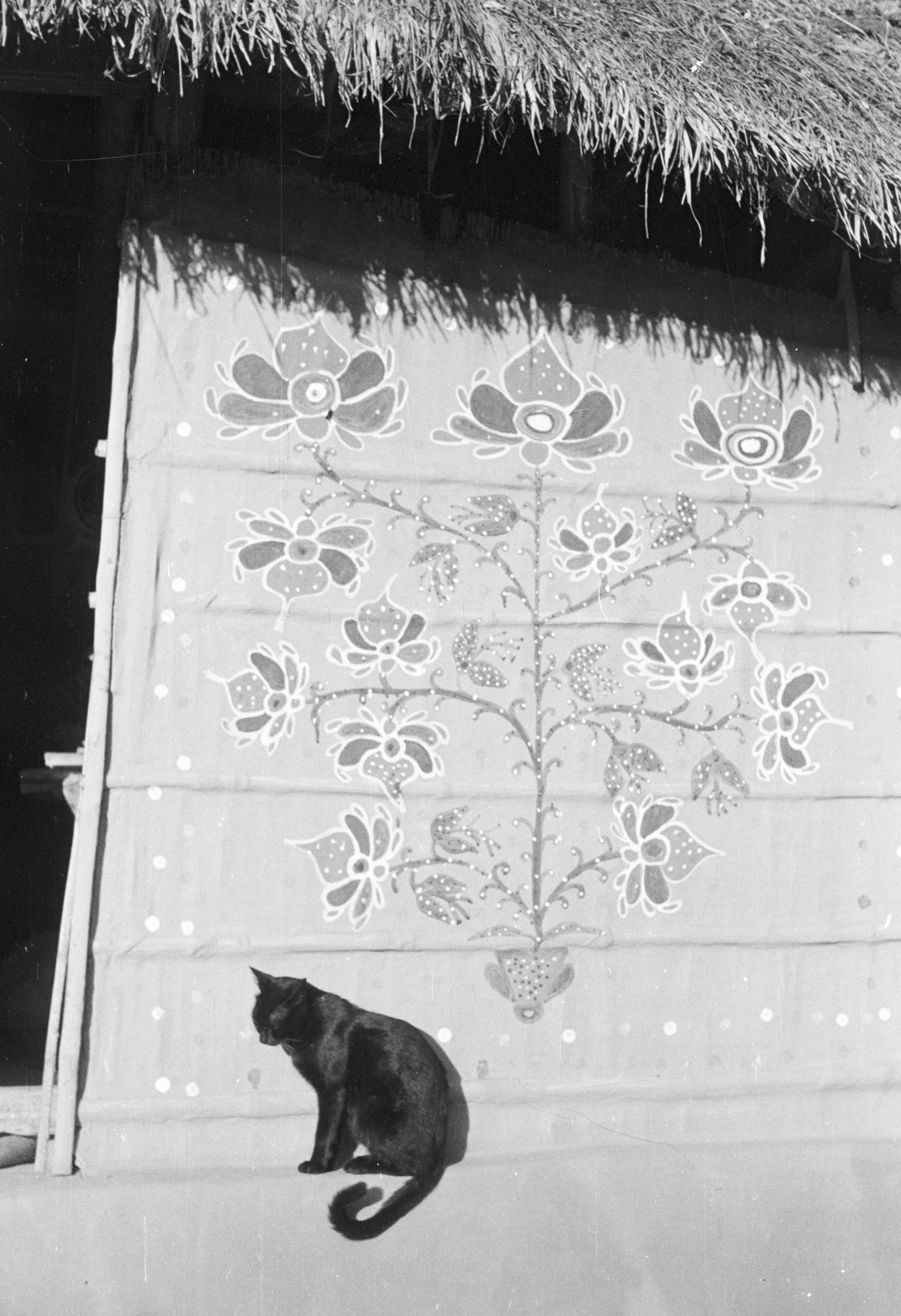
Traditional wall decoration, Bonpara, 1966
