= N6 (Bangladesh) =

National Highway in Bangladesh

N6
- Kashinathpur–Choto Sona Masjid Highway; Dhaka - Rajshahi Highway; Dhaka-Pabna Highway; Pabna - Rajshahi Highway; Rajshahi-Chapainawabganj Highway

Route information
- Part of AH41
- Maintained by Bangladesh Road Transport Authority
- Length: 204 km (127 mi)

Major junctions
- East end: Kashinathpur
- N5 / N504 - Kashinathpur Intersection; N704 / N705 - Dasuria Interchange; N507 - Banpara Interchange; N502 - Natore Intersection
- West end: Choto Sona Masjid

Location
- Country: Bangladesh

Highway system
- Roads in Bangladesh
← N5	→ N7

The N6 is a Bangladeshi national highway connecting Rajshahi and Kashinathpur in the Bangladeshi Division of Rajshahi.

== Junction list ==
The entire 204-kilometer route lies in Rajshahi Division.

Location	km	Mile	Destinations	Notes
Kashinathpur			N5, N504	
Pabna Bypass			N604	
Gaspara			N604	
Dasuria			N704, N705	
Banpara			N507	
Harispur			N602	
Chawk Bidaynath			N602	
Belpukur			N603	
Rajshahi			R680	
