= Hatikumrul Union =

Union in Rajshahi, Bangladesh

Hatikumrul Union হাতিকুমরুল ইউনিয়ন
- Union
- Location within Bangladesh
- Coordinates: 24.419218°N 89.551712°E
- Country: Bangladesh
- Division: Rajshahi
- District: Sirajganj
- Upazila: Ullapara
- Chairman-Member: union parishad

Government
  - Type: local government
  - Body: Chairman-ward Member
  - Chairman of union: (Bangladesh Awami League)

Area
  - Total: 14.70 km^{2} (5.68 sq mi)

Population (2011)
  - Total: 48,186
  - Density: 3,278/km^{2} (8,490/sq mi)
- Demonym: Bangladeshi
- Time zone: UTC+6 (BST)
- Postal code: 6760
- Website: hatikumrulup.sirajganj.gov.bd

Hatikumrul Union is a union council under Ullapara Upazila of Sirajganj district in Rajshahi division, Bangladesh . It covers an area of 14.70 square kilometres (5.68 sq mi) and had a population of approximately 48,186 according to the 2011 census. The union has a total of 39 villages and 5 mouzas.

== Notable places ==
- Hatikumrul Interchange
