= N4 (Bangladesh) =

National Highway in Bangladesh

N4
- Joydebpur–Jamalpur Highway

Route information
- Part of AH2 AH41
- Length: 216 km (134 mi)

Location
- Country: Bangladesh

Highway system
- Roads in Bangladesh
← N3	→ N5

The N4 is a Bangladeshi national highway connecting Joydebpur, near the Bangladeshi capital Dhaka, Tangail and Jamalpur. It is part of AH2 and AH41 roads in the Asian Highway Network.
