= N5 (Bangladesh) =

National Highway in Bangladesh. This is the most longest highway in Bangladesh

N5
- Dhaka–Rangpur-Banglabandha Highway

Route information
- Part of AH2 AH41
- Length: 625 km (388 mi)

Major junctions
- Dhaka end: N1
- Banglabandha end: Indian border

Location
- Country: Bangladesh

Highway system
- Roads in Bangladesh
← N4	→ N6

The N5 is a Bangladeshi national highway connecting the capital Dhaka, Rangpur and the town of Banglabandha on the Bangladesh-India border.

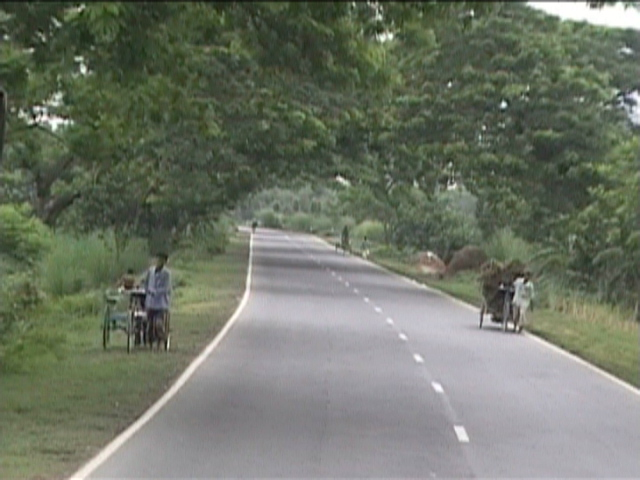
The N5 between Dhaka and Bogra

== Junction list ==
Division	Location	km	Mile	Destinations	Notes
Dhaka Division	Dhaka	0km	0mi	N1, N105	
Dhaka Division	Nabinagar	23km	14mi	R505	
Dhaka Division	Manikganj			R504	
Dhaka Division	Uthali			N503	
Ferry between Paturia Ferry Terminal and Kazirhat Launch Terminal
Rajshahi Division	Kashinathpur			N6, N504	
Rajshahi Division	Shahjahanpur			N515	
Rajshahi Division	Banani			N514 – Bogra	
Rajshahi Division	Jahangirabad			N502	
Rajshahi Division	Tinmatha			N510	
Rajshahi Division	Matidali			N514, N515	
Rajshahi Division	Mokamtola			R550	
Rangpur Division	Modern Mor, Rangpur			N516	
Rangpur Division	Rangpur			N517	
Rangpur Division	Saidpur			N518	
Rangpur Division	Ranirbandar			Z5005 Z5005	
Rangpur Division	Beldanga			N508	
Banglabandha			AH2 – India, Nepal		
