= Dhaka–Bhanga Expressway =

Expressway in Bangladesh

Dhaka–Mawa–Bhanga Expressway
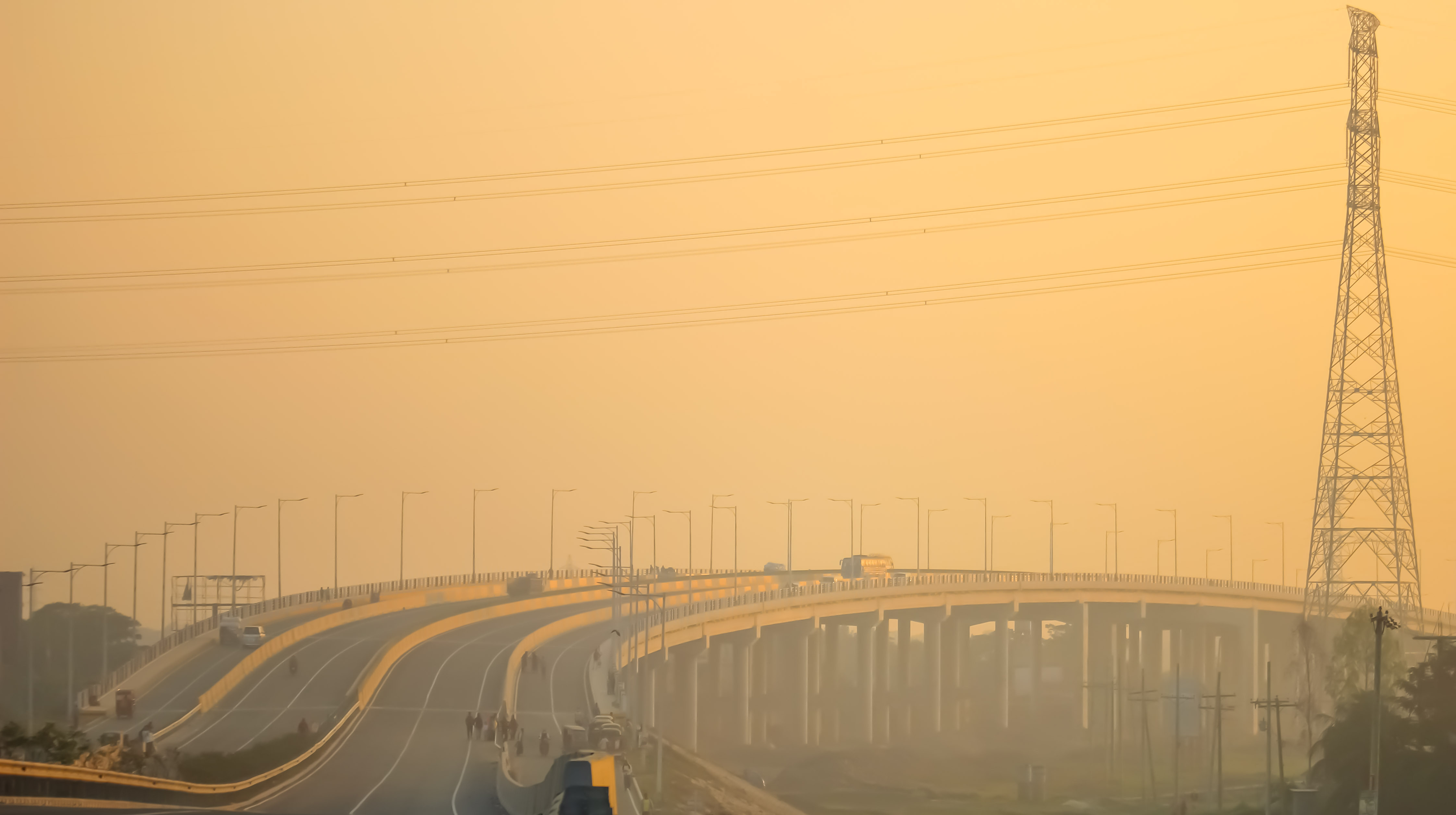
- Dhaka-Mawa-Bhanga Expressway

Route information
- Part of AH1
- Length: 55 km (34 mi)
- Existed: 12 March 2020–present

Major junctions
- From: Jatrabari Interchange in Dhaka, Bangladesh; N8
- To: Bhanga Interchange in Bhanga, Faridpur; N804 / N805

Location
- Country: Bangladesh

Highway system
- Roads in Bangladesh

The Dhaka–Bhanga Expressway, officially Dhaka–Mawa–Bhanga Expressway, is the first national expressway in Bangladesh. It is operated by the Road Transport and Highways Division. The express will be connected to Asian Highway 1. In 2022, it was officially named after Sheikh Mujibur Rahman. After the successful July uprising in 2024, locals tore down the expressway's official nameplate and hung a banner in the name of Islamic prophet Ibrahim. In 2025, its official name was changed to the present name.

== History ==
ECNEC approved the Dhaka-Mawa-Bhanga expressway construction under Dhaka-Khulna Highway Project on 3 May 2016. The budget for the project was Tk 11,003.90 crore, later revised to Tk 6,892 crore. However, only half of the construction was done with this allocated money. With an additional Tk 4,111.86 crore the construction was completed. RHD and Bangladesh Army were involved in the construction of the expressway.

On 19 August 2021, it was proposed that Korea Expressway Corporation should be given the task of toll management of the expressway. The proposal was made by the Cabinet Committee on Economic Affairs (CCEA).

== Overview ==
The six-lane expressway has two service lanes for local passengers, and 19 pedestrian underpasses for crossing. Its flyovers and bridges cross five rivers. The Padma Bridge is opened for public use, and people can use the bridge to enter the expressway.

== Junction list ==
District	Location	km	Mile	Destinations	Notes
Dhaka District	Jatrabari	0	0	N1	
Munshiganj District	Mawa	33.6	20.8		
Shariatpur District	Zanjira	45	27.9		
Madaripur District	Panchor	55.9	34.7		
Faridpur District	Bhanga	77	47.8	N804	
