= N808 (Bangladesh) =

National Highway 808 Faridpur Bypass Road ফরিদপুর বাইপাস রোড

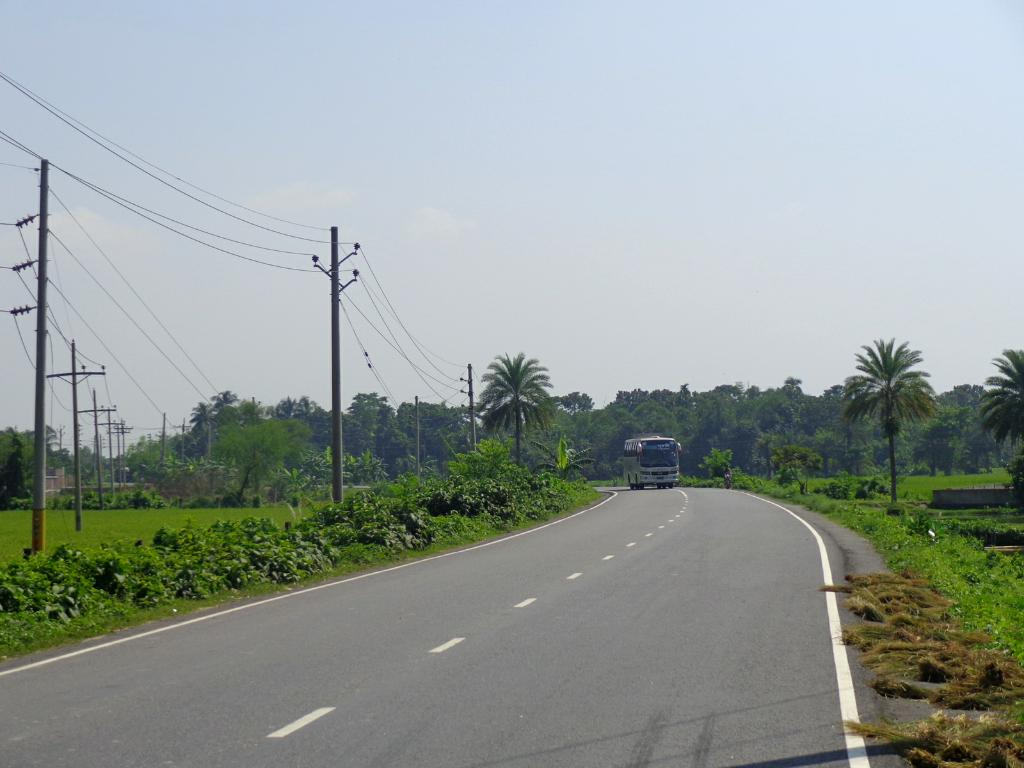

Route information
- Length: 5.32 km (3.31 mi)

Major junctions
- Goachamot end: N7 / N803 – Rajbari Road Junction
- Munshi Bazar end: N804 – Khandkar Nuru Mia Square

Location
- Country: Bangladesh

Highway system
- Roads in Bangladesh
← N807	→ N809

N808 known as Faridpur Bypass Road is a part of the national highway network of Bangladesh. The length of this bypass road is 5.32 kilometres (3.31 mi). The Faridpur Textile Institute is located on the western side of this road.

The decision to construct the Faridpur city bypass road was made in 2005–2006. Once land acquisition was completed, construction of the road officially began on May 24, 2009. Between 2005 and 2019, a total of 5221.48 lakh Bangladeshi Taka was spent on this project.

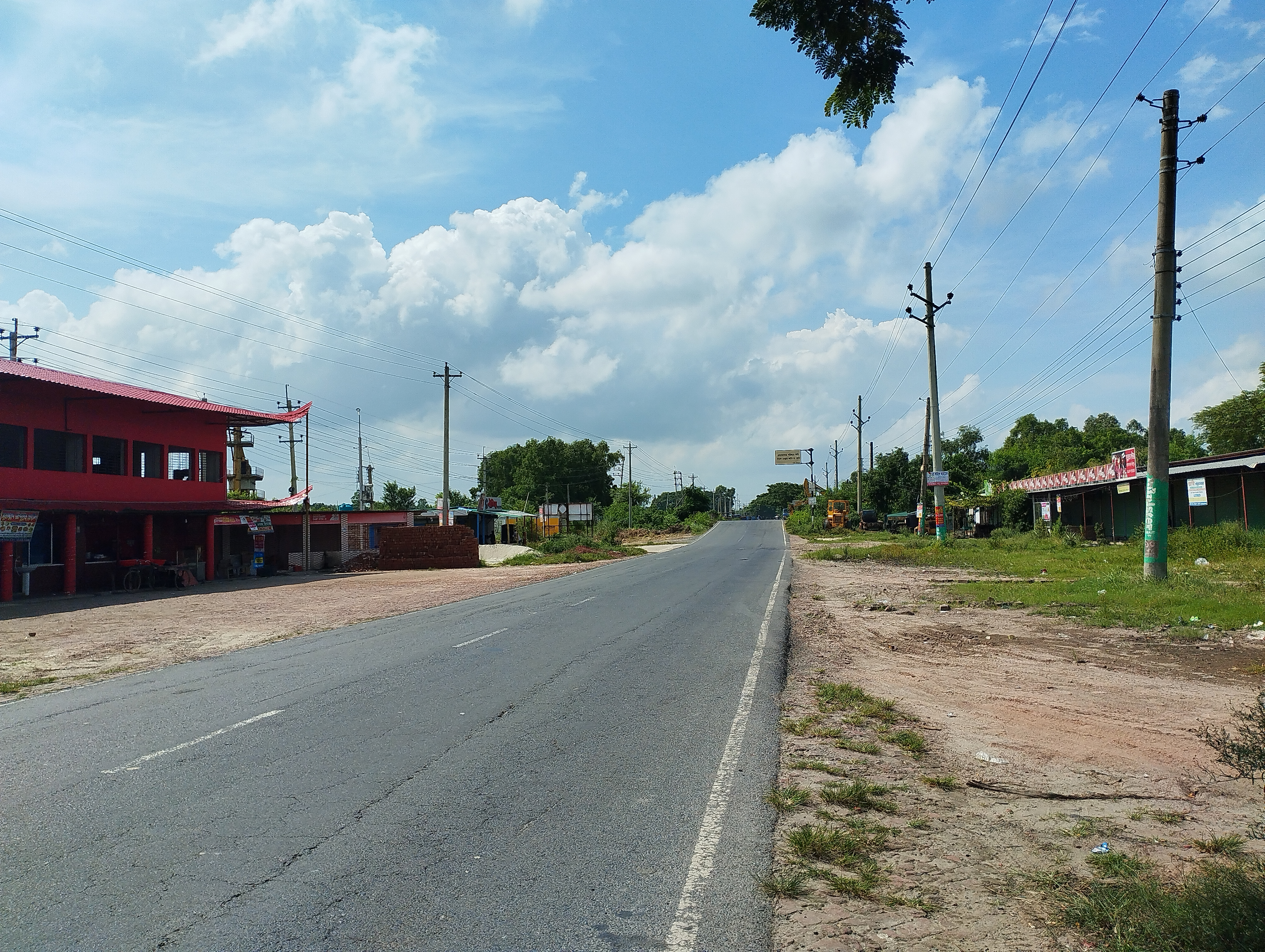
In front of Faridpur Textile Institute
