= R880 (Bangladesh) =

Regional highway in Bangladesh

R880
- Patuakhali-Amtali-Barguna-Kakchira Highway

Route information
- Maintained by Roads and Highways Department
- Length: 56 km (35 mi)

Major junctions
- Patuakhali end: Patuakhali Chourasta
- N8 - Patuakhali; R881 - Barguna
- Kakchira end: Kakchira

Location
- Country: Bangladesh
- Districts: Patuakhali, Barguna
- Towns: Patuakhali, Barguna

Highway system
- Roads in Bangladesh
← R870	→ R881

The R880 or Patuakhali-Amtali-Barguna-Kakchira Highway is a transportation artery in Bangladesh, which connects National Highway N8 (at Patuakhali town) with Zilla Highway Z8708 (at Kakchira). It is 56 kilometres (35 mi) in length, and the road is a Regional Highway of the Roads and Highways Department of Bangladesh.

== See also ==
- N8 (Bangladesh)
- List of roads in Bangladesh
