= Bhanga interchange =

Major road junction in Bangladesh

Bhanga Interchange
- Bhanga Roundabout
- Interactive map of Bhanga Interchange

Location
- Bhanga, Faridpur District, Bangladesh
- Coordinates: 23.3901878°N 89.9839308°E
- Roads at junction: Dhaka–Bhanga Expressway; Dhaka–Khulna highway; Dhaka–Faridpur highway; Dhaka–Patuakhali highway

Construction
- Type: Cloverleaf interchange
- Opened: 2021
- Maintained by: Road Transport and Highways Division

Bhanga Interchange (Bengali: ভাঙ্গা ইন্টারচেঞ্জ), also known as Bhanga Roundabout (Bengali: ভাঙ্গা গোলচত্বর), is a major road interchange in Bhanga, Faridpur District, Bangladesh which consists of a cloverleaf interchange. It connects at least 21 districts of South Bengal in Bangladesh with Dhaka, capital of the country which is a junction of four national highways named Dhaka–Bhanga Expressway, Bhanga–Khulna highway, Dhaka–Faridpur highway and Dhaka–Patuakhali highway.

== Background ==
In 2016, work began on the Dhaka–Bhanga section of the National Highway 8 to transform it into an expressway, which was scheduled to be completed by 2019. As part of the conversion project, plans were made to construct one of the expressway's three road interchanges at Bhanga in Faridpur district. On 12 March, 2020, the expressway, named Dhaka–Bhanga Expressway was inaugurated. Before the construction of the expressway, there was a road junction in Bhanga which became an interchange after the opening in April 2020. After completion of the interchange, it is now a tourist attraction.

== Issues ==
The interchange has design flaws. As its embankment is not made of concrete, the interchange has been damaged several times due to rain. Apart from this, waterlogging caused by rain causes difficulty in vehicular movement at the interchange. It is not connected to the two service lanes of the Dhaka–Bhanga Expressway. As a result, vehicles cannot be redirected using the service lanes to other roads using it. The interchange is designed without consideration of freight vehicles, making it risky to enter the interchange using its four loops of 270 degree and confusing for drivers. On 6 June 2023, the West Zone Power Distribution Company disconnected the electricity connection of the interchange due to non-payment of a bill of ৳3.1 million by the Road Transport and Highways Division. The Road Transport and Highways Division claimed that they didn’t have the fund to pay electricity bill. Due to the lack of electricity, the lampposts at the interchange were not illuminated and criminal activities increased and tourists decreased. Electricity connection was restored after 51 days, the day after payment of arrears of ৳2.5 million on 26 July 2023. After that activities of passengers at the interchange became normal.

== See also ==
- Hatikumrul Interchange
