= R881 (Bangladesh) =

Regional Highway in Bangladesh

R881
- Amtali-Khepupara-Kuakata Highway

Route information
- Maintained by Roads and Highways Department
- Length: 41 km (25 mi)

Major junctions
- Amtali end: Amtali
- R880 - Patuakhali
- Kuakata end: Kuakata sea beach

Location
- Country: Bangladesh
- Districts: Barguna, Patuakhali

Highway system
- Roads in Bangladesh
← R880	→ R890

The R881 or Amtali-Khepupara-Kuakata Highway is a transportation artery in Bangladesh, which connects Kuakata Sea beach with Regional Highway R880 (at Amtali). It is 41 kilometres (25 mi) in length, and the road is a Regional Highway of the Roads and Highways Department of Bangladesh.

== See also ==
- N8 (Bangladesh)
- List of roads in Bangladesh
