= R771 (Bangladesh) =

Regional highway in Bangladesh

R771
- Rupsha-Fakirhat-Bagerhat Highway

Route information
- Maintained by Roads and Highways Department
- Length: 31 km (19 mi)

Major junctions
- Rupsha end: Rupsha Ferry Terminal
- N7 - Khulna; N805 / R770 - Bagerhat
- Bagerhat end: Khan Jahan Ali Majar Bus Stop

Location
- Country: Bangladesh
- Districts: Khulna, Bagerhat
- Major cities: Khulna
- Towns: Bagerhat

Highway system
- Roads in Bangladesh
← R770	→ R773

The R771 or Rupsha-Fakirhat-Bagerhat Highway is a transportation artery in Bangladesh, which connects National Highway N7 (at Rupsha) with Regional Highway R770 (at Bagerhat). It is 31 kilometres (19 mi) in length, and is a Regional Highway of the Roads and Highways Department of Bangladesh. It starts at the Rupsha East Ferry Terminal, goes to Fakirhat and Jathrapur, and ends at Khan Jahan Ali Mazar Roundabout or R770.

== See also ==
- N7 (Bangladesh)
- List of roads in Bangladesh
