= R770 (Bangladesh) =

Regional highway in Bangladesh

R770
- Noapara-Bagerhat-Pirojpur Highway

Route information
- Maintained by Roads and Highways Department
- Length: 43 km (27 mi)

Major junctions
- Bagerhat end: Katakhali
- N805 - Bagerhat; R870 - Pirojpur
- Pirojpur end: Pirojpur city

Location
- Country: Bangladesh
- Districts: Bagerhat, Pirojpur
- Towns: Bagerhat, Pirojpur

Highway system
- Roads in Bangladesh
← R765	→ R771

The R770 or Noapara-Bagerhat-Pirojpur Highway is a transportation artery in Bangladesh, which connects National Highway N805 (at Katakhali) with Regional Highway R870 (at Pirojpur). It is 43 kilometres (27 mi) in length, and the road is a Regional Highway of the Roads and Highways Department of Bangladesh.

== See also ==
- N7 (Bangladesh)
- List of roads in Bangladesh
