= Gunahar Zamindar Bari =

Royal residence in Bangladesh

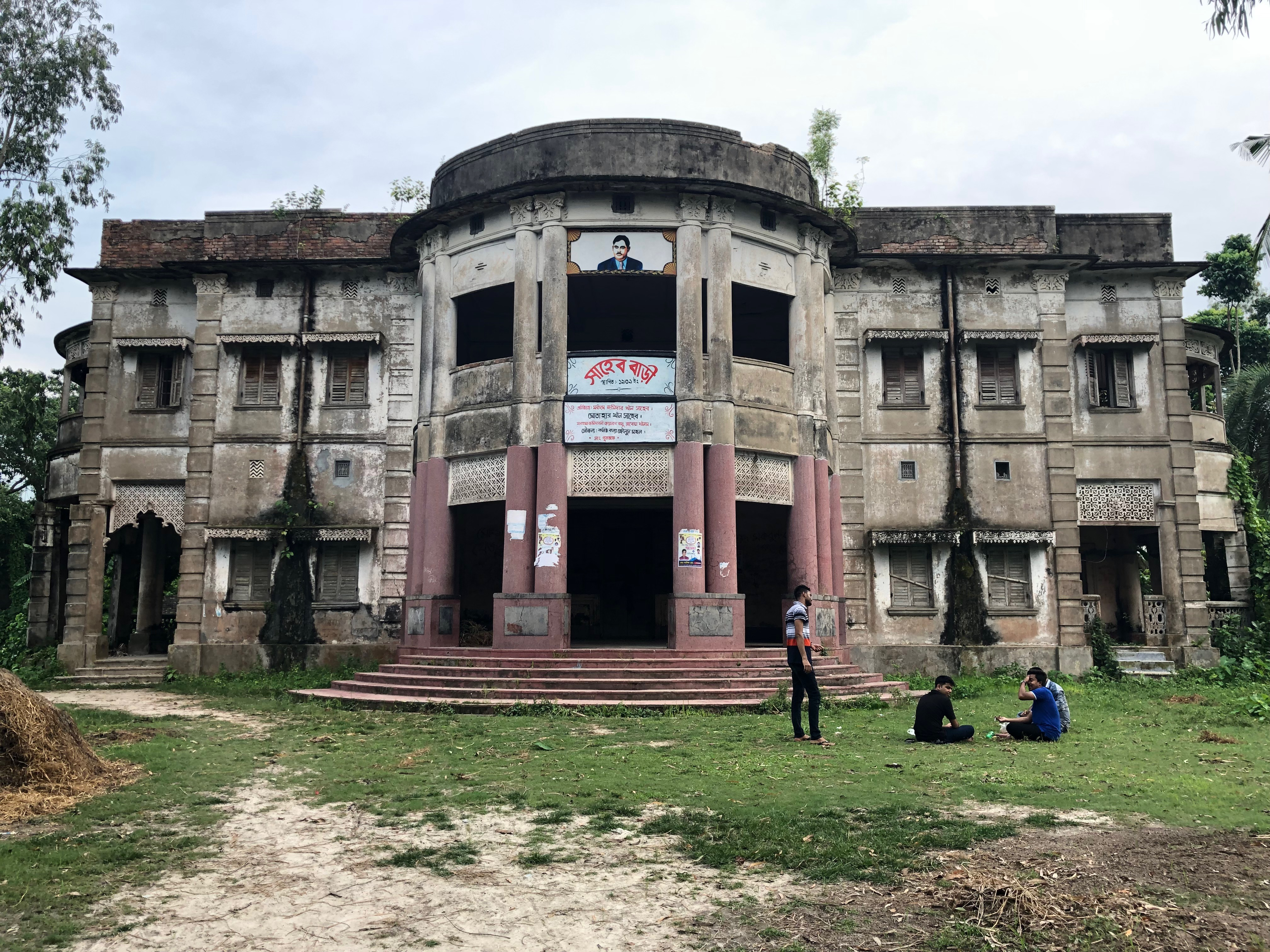
- Front of Gunahar Zamindar Palace
- Creation date: 1819
- First holder: Sundar Ali Khan

The Gunahar Zamindar Bari (Bengali: গুনাহার জমিদার বাড়ি) was a zamindari estate based in the Bogra District of Bangladesh. The residential palace, popularly known as Saheb Bari (Bengali: সাহেব বাড়ি), was the erstwhile Zamindars of Gunahar in Dhupchanchia. The present building was constructed in 1941, and remains a tourist attraction.

== Location ==
The zamindar palace is located in the Gunahar Union, roughly 7km from the headquarters of the Dhupchanchia Upazila of Bogra District.

== History ==
Roughly 200 years ago, Sundar Ali Khan, a Muslim aristocrat from the United Provinces was granted land in Gunahar by the British Raj, where he decided to settle. After his death, his one and only son, Ramzan Ali Khan, became the next zamindar (feudal lord) of Gunahar. The latter named the estate as Jahanun Nessa Estate after the name of his wife. The couple had two sons, Miyan Jan Khan and Meher Jan Khan.

Miyan Jan Khan had three sons; Kawthar Ali Khan, Abdul Majid Khan and Mamtaz Ali Khan. Meher Jan Khan also had three sons; Abdul Latif Khan, Motahar Husayn Khan and Muhsin Ali Khan, in addition to three daughters; Zubaydah Khatun, Aminah Khatun and Akhtarunnessa. Hamida Khatun, daughter of Zubaydah Khatun, is the mother-in-law of Ashraful Huda, the 22nd Inspector General of Bangladesh Police. Aminah Khatun's son, Abdur Rashid Khan (Ali Khan) was the lifelong chairman of the Gunahar Union Council and the founder of Gunahar Primary School. Khandakar Azadur Rahman, son of Akhtarunnesa's daughter Anwara Khatun Hasnah, was the former Chief Engineer of the Roads and Highways Department.

Motahar Husayn Khan was born in 1894 in the village of Gunahar. He was later granted the title of Khan Bahadur by the British Raj. During his lifetime, he had established the Taluch High School and Taluch Hat in the name of his first son Omar Haydar Khan. Motahar Husayn Khan was also the Excise Commissioner of Bengal, Bihar and Orissa under the British government. In 1941, he established the Gunahar Zamindar Bari (variously known as Saheb Bari, Khan Bari or Raj Bari). It was popularly visited by locals as it was one of the first houses in the area to have a telephone connection, kerosene oil fan and various fancy furniture. He married Zaynab Banu Rabiah Khanom and had five daughters and a son. Following the East Bengal State Acquisition and Tenancy Act of 1950, Motahar lost his status as a zamindar. Motahar Husayn Khan died in his palace on 2 July 1952.

== Present circumstances ==
Zamindar Khan Bahadur Motahar Husayn Khan's two eldest daughters married into the Nawab family of Murshidabad. The third daughter married a relative of the Nawabs of Murshidabad under the mediation of A. K. Fazlul Huq. His second son, Zubayr Hayat Khan, established Gunahar Union Council Complex and Gunahar Post Office. His daughter, Rawnaq Mahal Dilruba Begum, founded a healthcare centre (hospital). She also received a certificate from Sheikh Mujibur Rahman in 1972 for her contribution during the Bangladesh Liberation War of 1971.

His youngest daughter, Jaulas Mahal Akhtari Begum passed her Bachelor of Arts in 1973, a few days after her marriage to Dr Abdul Majid. Her plan was to study law in the United Kingdom following her Masters but her father-in-law persuaded her not to pursue that. In 1977, Dr Abdul Majid was sent to work for the Government of Libya. Being unable to live without him, she also moved to Libya in 1987. Her father-in-law Mahir Uddin Ahmad entrusted the Gunahar Zamindari to Sulayman bin Qurban Ali of nearby Amjhupi. Akhtari Begum returned to Bangladesh in 2008 and saw that everything in the estate had been evicted. According to her, the palace was taken over by those entrusted and she claimed that they had also sold a lot of land without permission. According to the latest estimates, 8 bighas of land had been evicted. Among her children, two sons live in Dhaka whilst her other son and daughter live in the United States. She lost contact with her husband in 2011 after the Killing of Muammar Gaddafi. After contacting the Bangladeshi embassy in Libya, she was able to call Dr Abdul Majid three to four times, before losing communication totally. She migrated to Khilgaon in Dhaka where she lives in hiding as people want to attack her for her property. She has claimed that there have been several murder attempts against her in both Bogra and Dhaka.

== Gallery ==
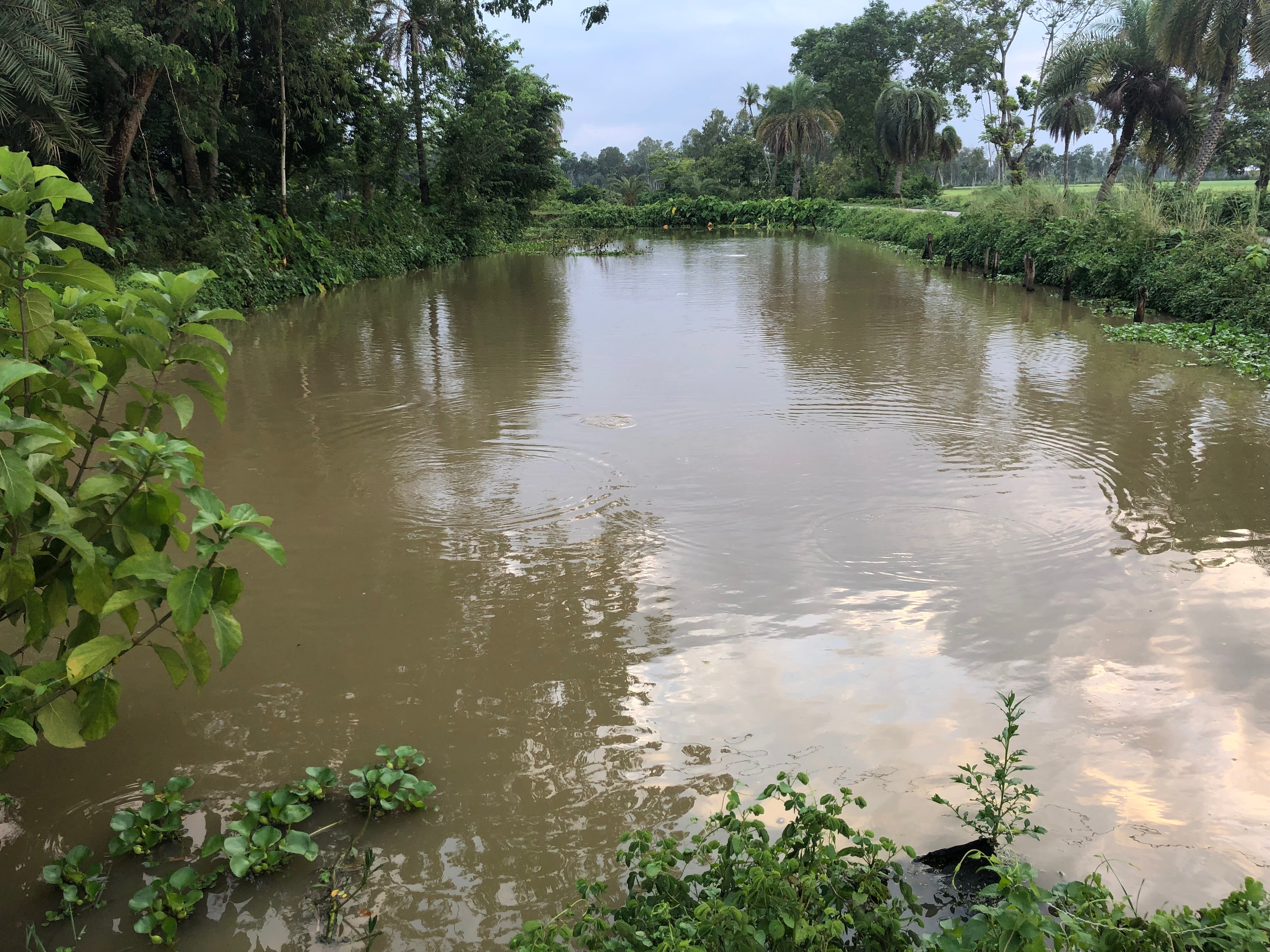
The canal on the right side of Gunahar Zamindar Palace

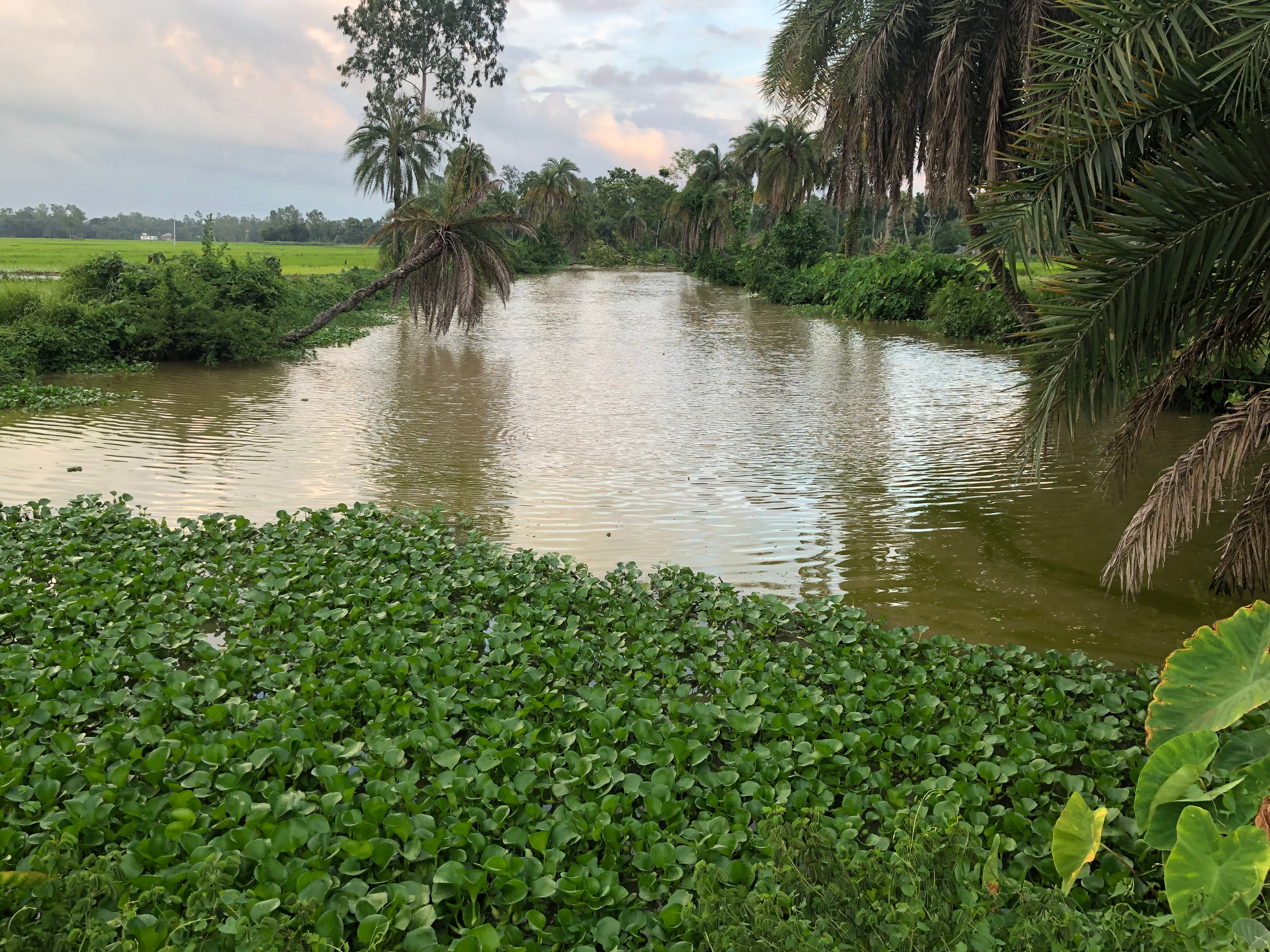
The canal on the left side

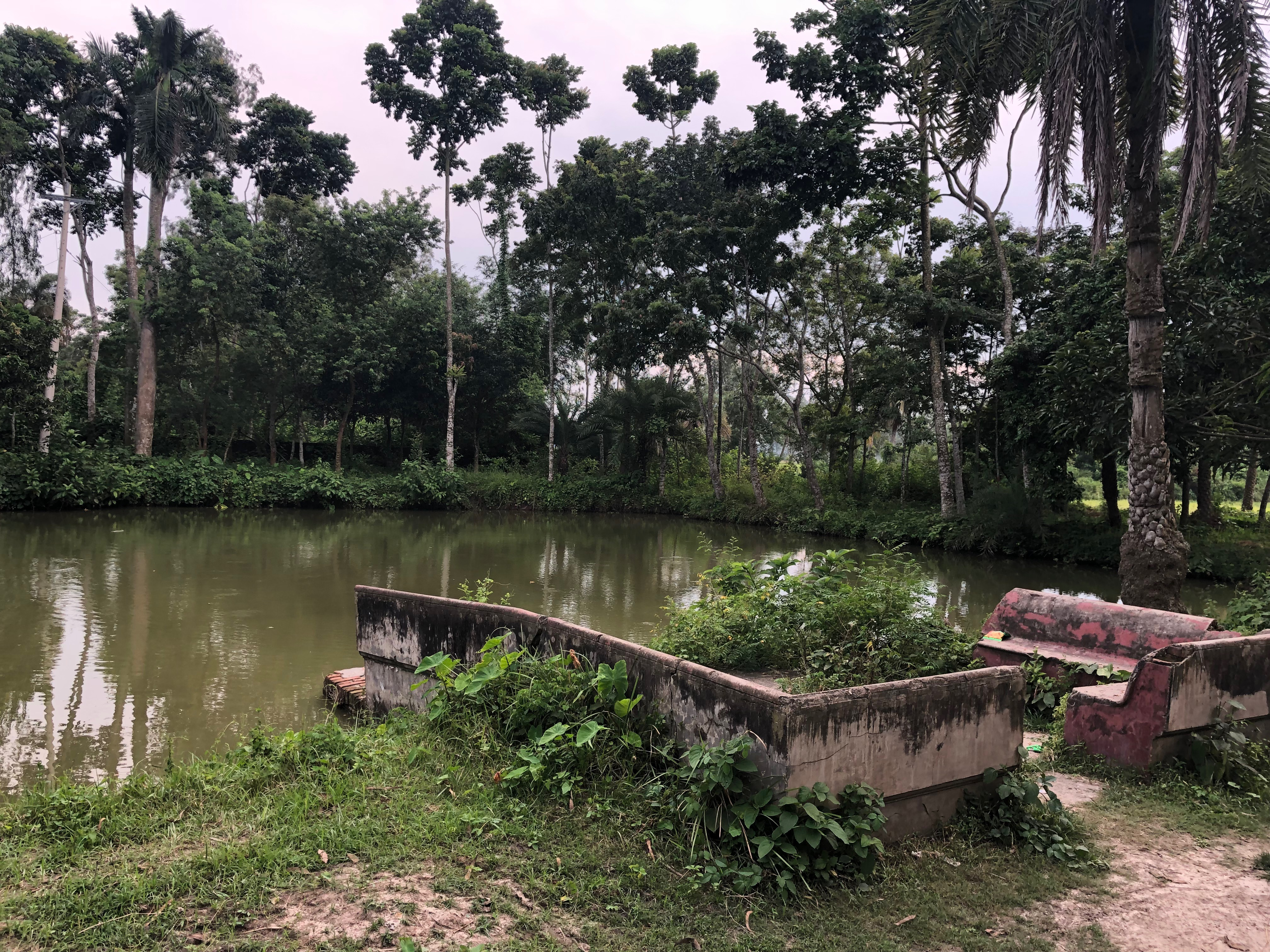
Estate pond

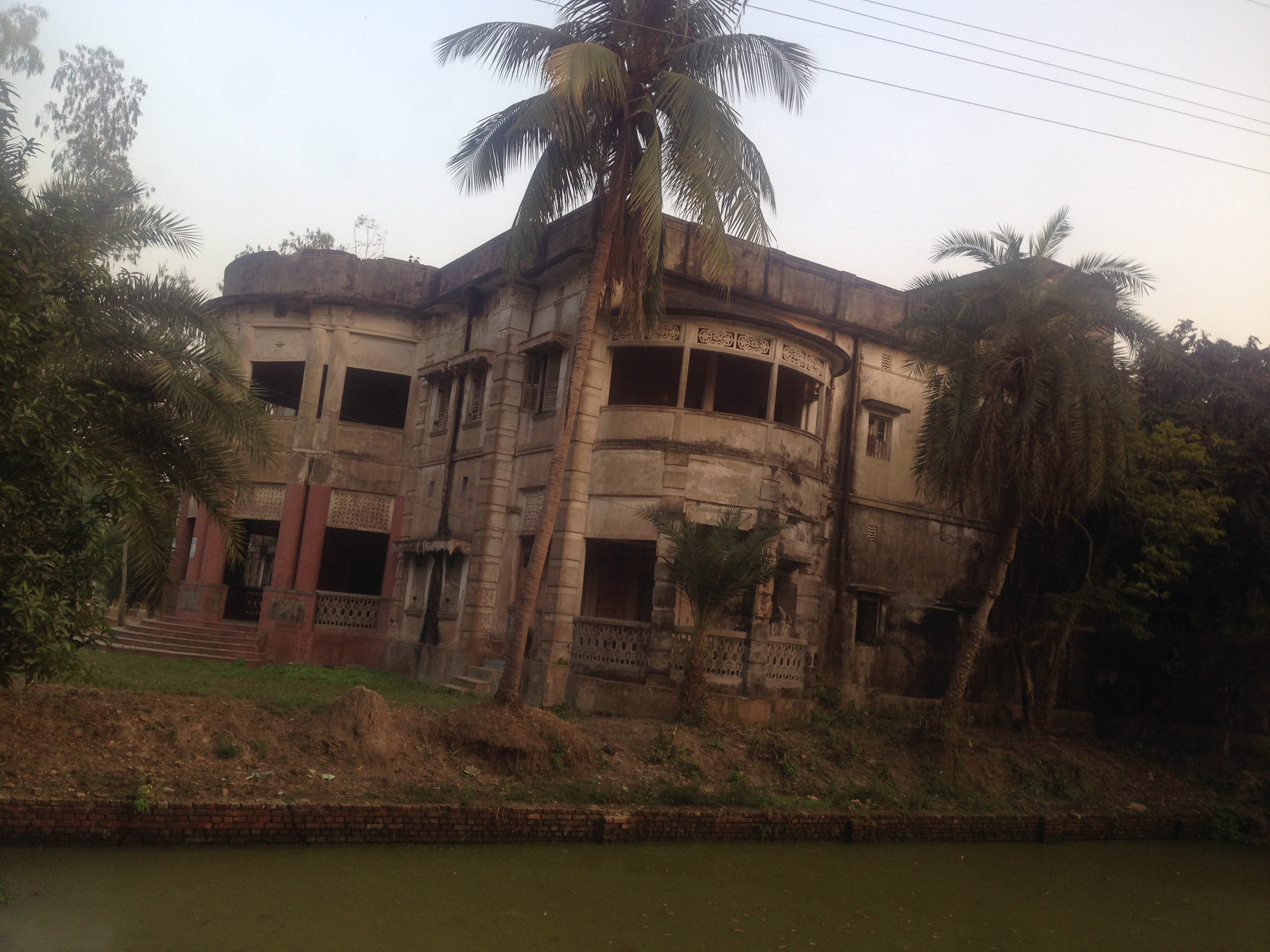
View from pond

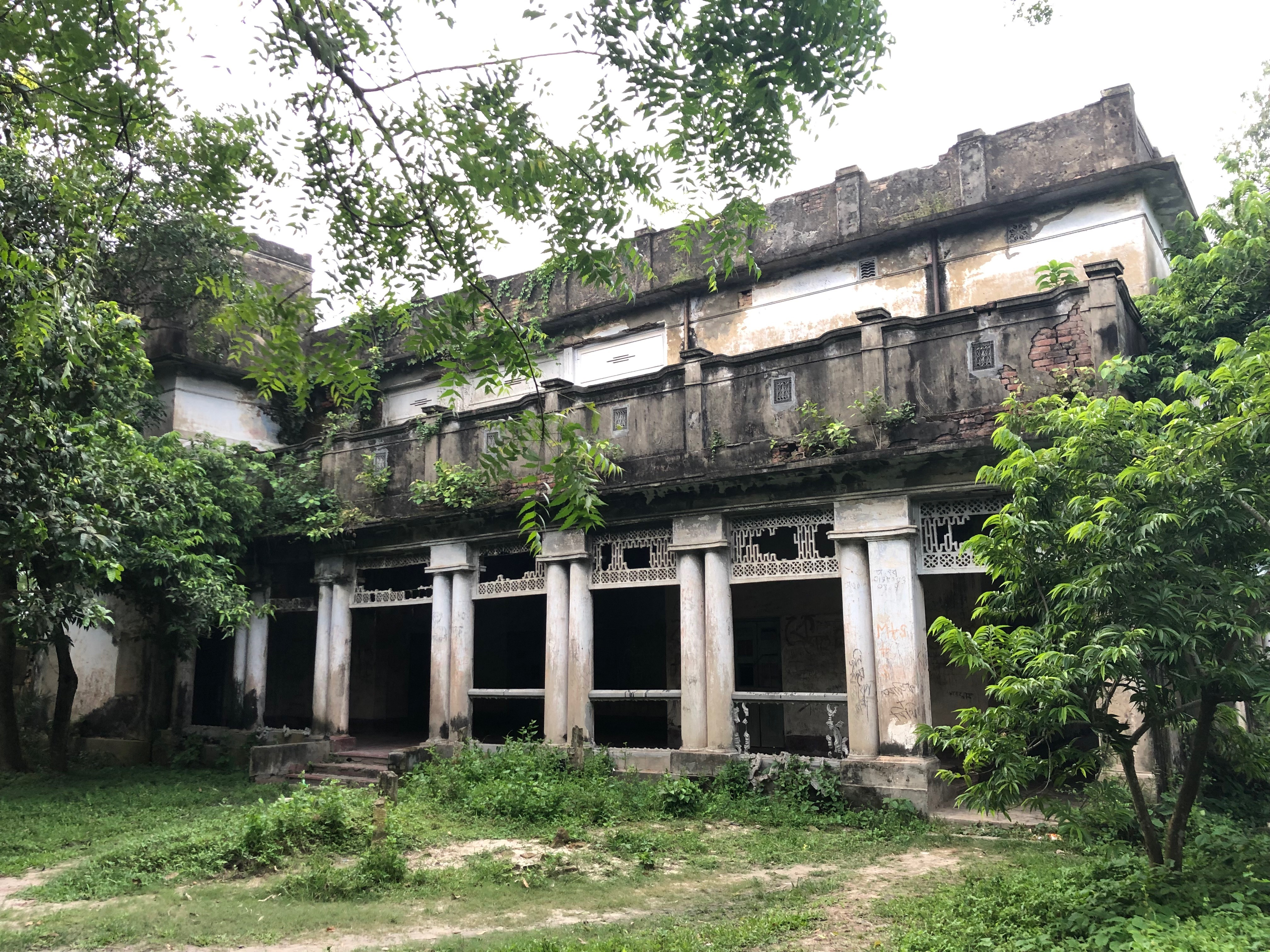
Back view
