= R870 (Bangladesh) =

Regional highway in Bangladesh

R870
- Barishal-Pirojpur Highway

Route information
- Maintained by Roads and Highways Department
- Length: 64 km (40 mi)

Major junctions
- Barishal end: Rupatoli Roundabout
- N8 - Barishal; R770 - Pirojpur
- Pirojpur end: Pirojpur city

Location
- Country: Bangladesh
- Districts: Barishal, Jhalokati, Pirojpur
- Major cities: Barishal
- Towns: Jhalokati, Bhandaria, Pirojpur

Highway system
- Roads in Bangladesh
| ← R861 | → R880 |

The R870 or Barishal-Pirojpur Highway is a transportation artery in Bangladesh, which connects National Highway N8 (at Barishal City) with Regional Highway R770 (at Pirojpur). It is 64 kilometres (40 mi) in length, and the road is a Regional Highway of the Roads and Highways Department of Bangladesh.

== See also ==
- N8 (Bangladesh)
- R771 (Bangladesh)
