= N805 (Bangladesh) =

Road in Bangladesh

N805
- Dhaka–Khulna Highway; Dhaka - Gopalgonj Highway; Gopalgonj–Khulna Highway

Route information
- Part of AH1 AH41
- Length: 111 km (69 mi)

Major junctions
- North end: Bhanga interchange
- Katakhali N7; Town Noapara N807 & R770; Fakirhat R771; GhonaparaR850; Bhatiapara N806; Bhanga Interchange N8 & N804
- South end: Katakhali intersection

Location
- Country: Bangladesh

Highway system
- Roads in Bangladesh
← N804	→ N806

The N805 is a Bangladeshi National Highway which connects Khulna to Bhanga via Gopalgonj. It starts from Bhanga Interchange and ends at Katakhali, Fakirhat in Bagerhat District.

== Major junction ==
The major junction of this road are; In Katakali, Bagerhat it meet with N7. In Town Noapara it meet with R770. In Gonapara and Police lines, it overlap with R850. In Bhatiapara, Gopalgonj it meet with N707. In Bhanga Interchange it meet with N804 and N8

== See also ==
- List of roads in Bangladesh
