= Gunahar Union =

Union of Dupchanchia Upazila of Bogura, Rajshahi, Bangladesh

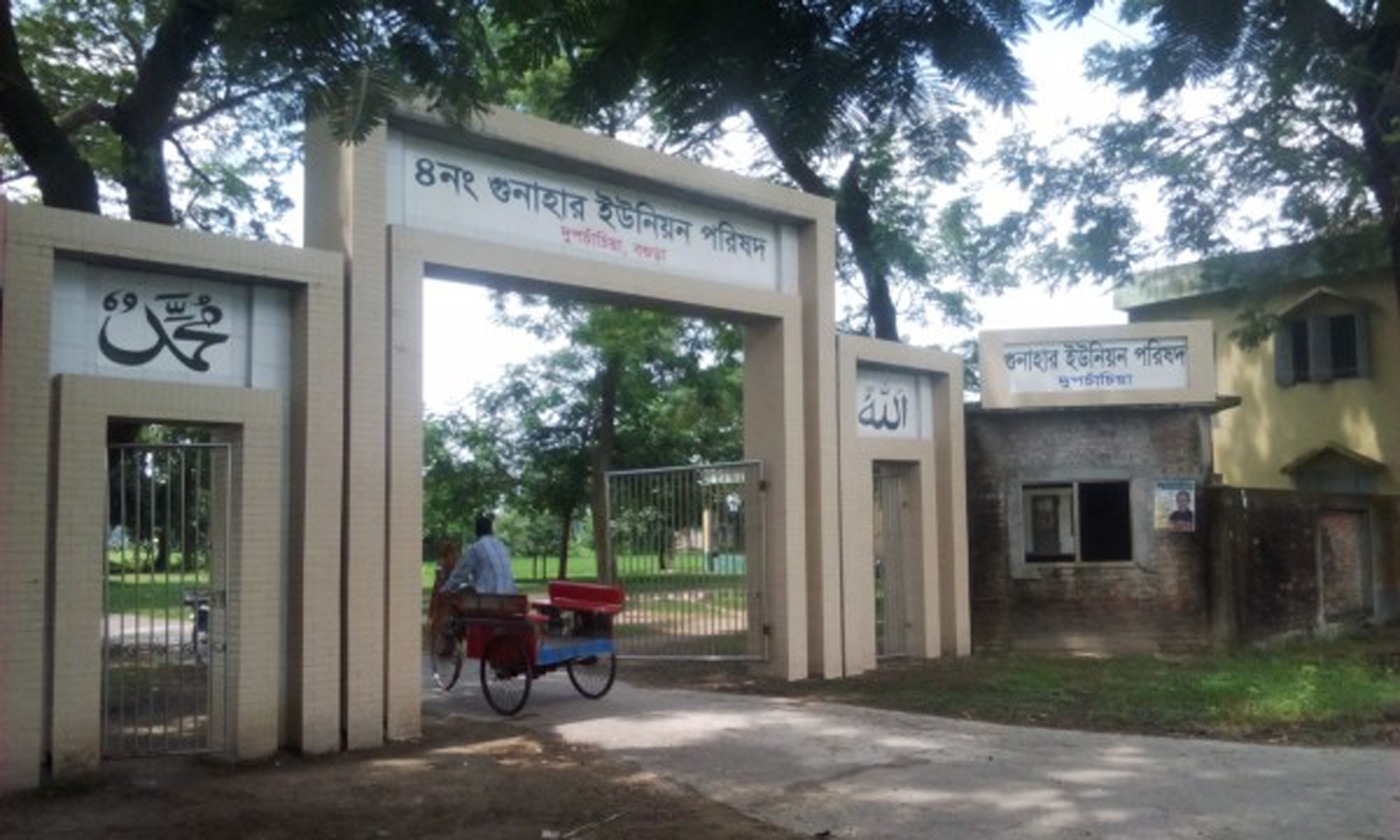
Entrance of the Guanar Union Office

Gunahar union is a union of Dupchanchia Upazila of Bogra district of Rajshahi division of Bangladesh. This union's geographic contact code (geocode) is 50.10.33.54. The current chairman of the union Noor Mohammad. It was also the headquarters of the erstwhile Zamindars of Gunahar.

== History ==
The union was formed in 1976. Zamindar Khan Bahadur Motahar Husayn Khan, who belonged the Khan family of Gunahar, established the high school and haat in Taluch with the name of his first son Omar Haydar Khan. His second son, Zubayr Hayat Khan, established the Gunahar Union Council Complex building and Gunahar Post Office and his nephew, Abdur Rashid Khan (Ali Khan), served as a lifelong chairman of the Gunahar Union Council and founded the Gunahar Primary School.

== Geography ==
The total area of this union is 18.09 km^{2}, located between Dupchanchia Upazila Sadar.

== Administrative area ==
Gunnar union consists of a mouza / village. The mouza is divided into 9 administrative wards.

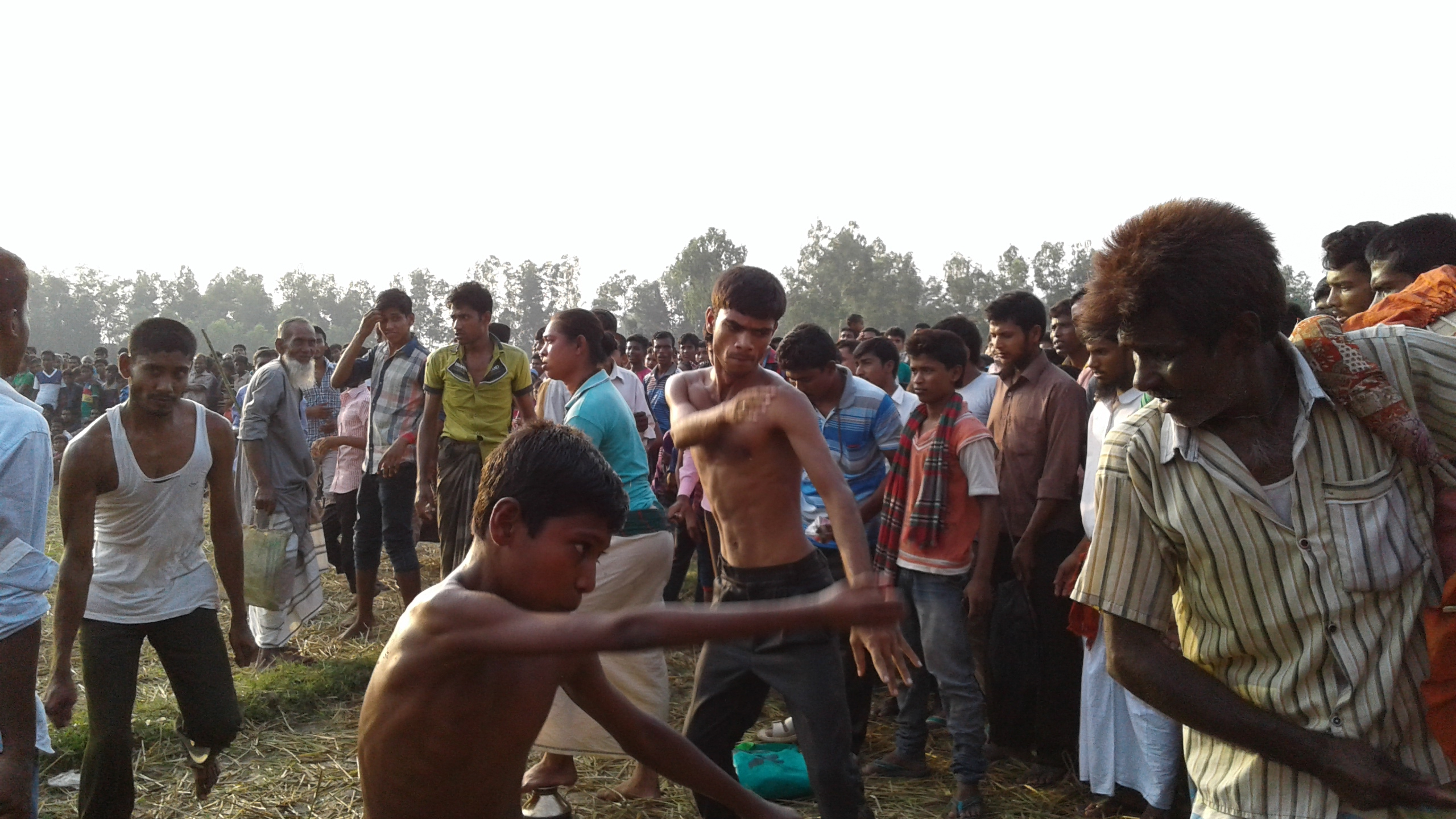
Traditional folk fairs of the Jhajhira village

The villages are:

- Ward no. 1 – Atoil, Koigari, Jaroi, Boro Nilahaali, Beragram, Sorom.
- Ward no. 2 – Chhatny, Taluch, Pachusha
- Ward no. 3 – Chandimandap, Chhoto Karamji, Jhajira, Dangapara, Raghubarshipur.
- Ward no. 4 – Amjhupy, Gunahara, Palokuri, Bhanduriya.
- Ward no. 5 – Singa, Kamaru, Kazigari, Belhotti, Pukuragacha .
- Ward no. 6 – Arjunagari, Kurahar, keot, Choto Barram, Suhali.
- Ward no. 7 – Unahat, Bhatahar, Singra, Surzata
- Ward no. 8 – Khagra, Damkuri, Pouta, Merai.
- Ward no. 9 – Paogacha, Dochia, Bhathanda, Nurpur.

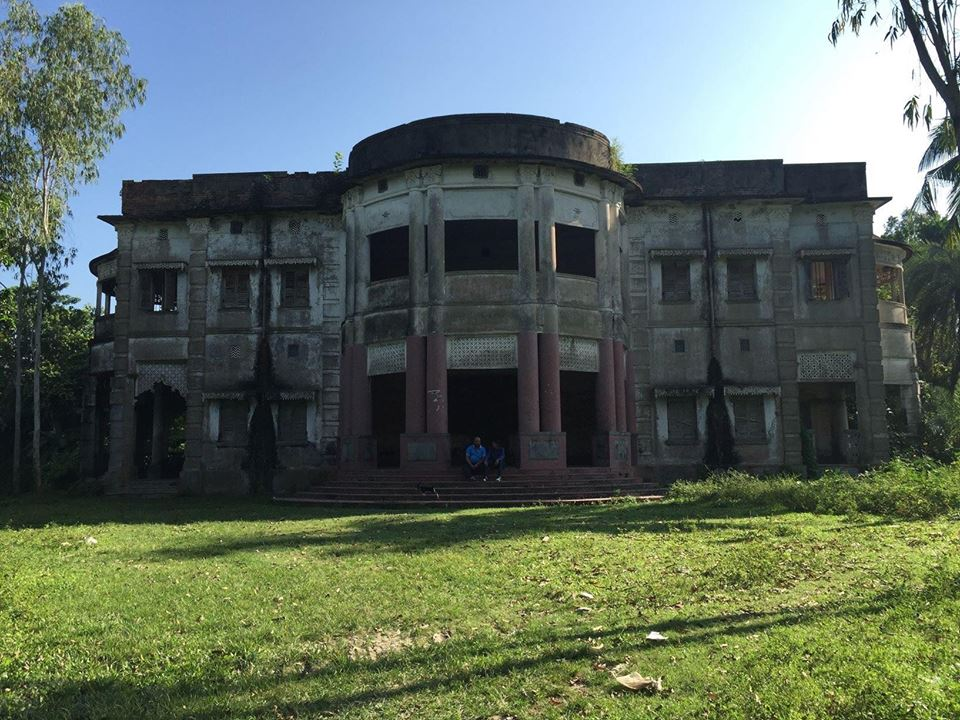
The Zamidar house of Gunahar

Each ward has an elected representative (council member). Again, there are elected women representatives (female members of the council) in every three wards. They are reporting the elected representatives (chairman of the council). The council also has one recruited secretary, ten village police and one entrepreneur.

== Population ==
According to the 2011 census, the total population of Gunner union was 30,586.

== Education ==
The average literacy rate of Gunahar union is 50.0%. Among them, the rate of female literacy is 45.6% and the male literacy rate is 54.8%. Among the important educational institutions in this area.

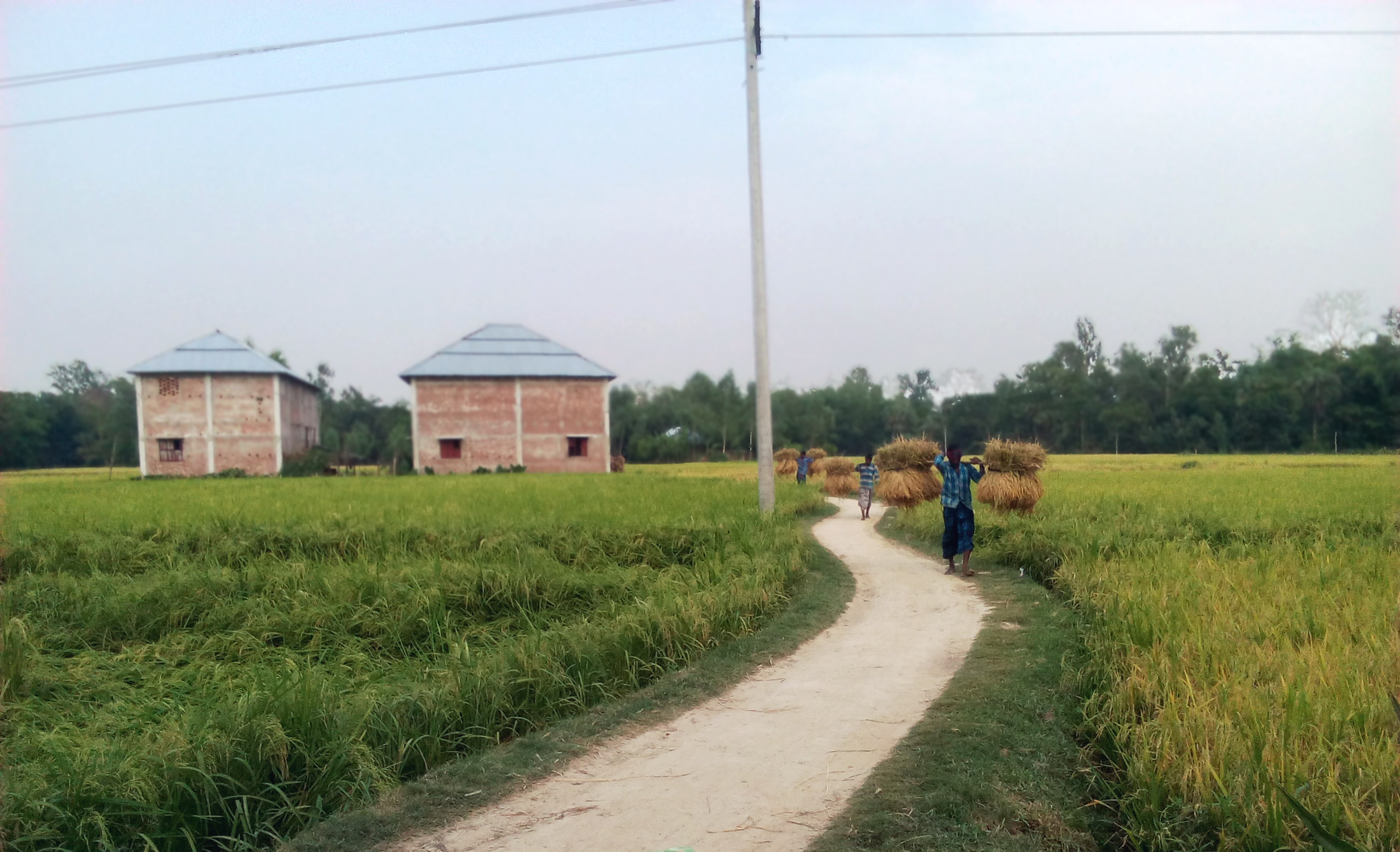
Farmers of Gunahar

== Economics ==
The economy of Gunahar Union is largely dependent on agriculture.
