= N806 (Bangladesh) =

Road in Bangladesh

N806
- Dhaka–Khulna Highway; Dhaka – Jashore Highway; Benapole-Jashore-Dhaka Highway; Jashore–Bhanga Highway; Jashore – Narail Highway; Jashore- Narail- Kalna- Bhanga Highway

Route information
- Part of AH1
- Length: 56 km (35 mi)

Major junctions
- Beltway around Narail
- Bhatiapara end: Bhatiapara Interchange
- N7 / N707 – Manihar; N805 – Bhatiapara Interchange
- Jashore end: Manihar Intersection

Location
- Country: Bangladesh

Highway system
- Roads in Bangladesh
| ← N805 | → N807 |

The N806 is a Bangladeshi National Highway which connects Jashore to Bhatiapara via Narail & Kalna toward Bhanga Interchange. The route starts from Bhatiapara near Kashiani and ends at Manihar in Jashore city.

== Major Junction ==
At Manihar in Jashore its meet with N7 & N707 In Bhatiapara it meets with N805. This route is also part of AH1.

== See also ==
List of roads in Bangladesh
