= N807 (Bangladesh) =

Highway in Bangladesh

N807
- Barishal–Khulna Highway; Khulna - Bagerhat Highway; Barishal–Pirojpur Highway

Route information
- Length: 95 km (59 mi)

Major junctions
- Rupatoli end: Rupatoli Bus terminal
- Barisal (N8) -Jhalakathi (Z8730)-Pirojpur (Z7704) Bagerhat (R771) connects to N805 at Town Noapara
- Noapara end: Noapara

Location
- Country: Bangladesh

Highway system
- Roads in Bangladesh
← N806	→ N809

The N807 is a Bangladeshi National Highway which connects Barishal to Khulna via Pirojpur. It starts from the Rupatoli bus terminal and ends at Noapara, Fakirhat in Bagerhat District.
