= N803 (Bangladesh) =

National highway of Bangladesh

N803

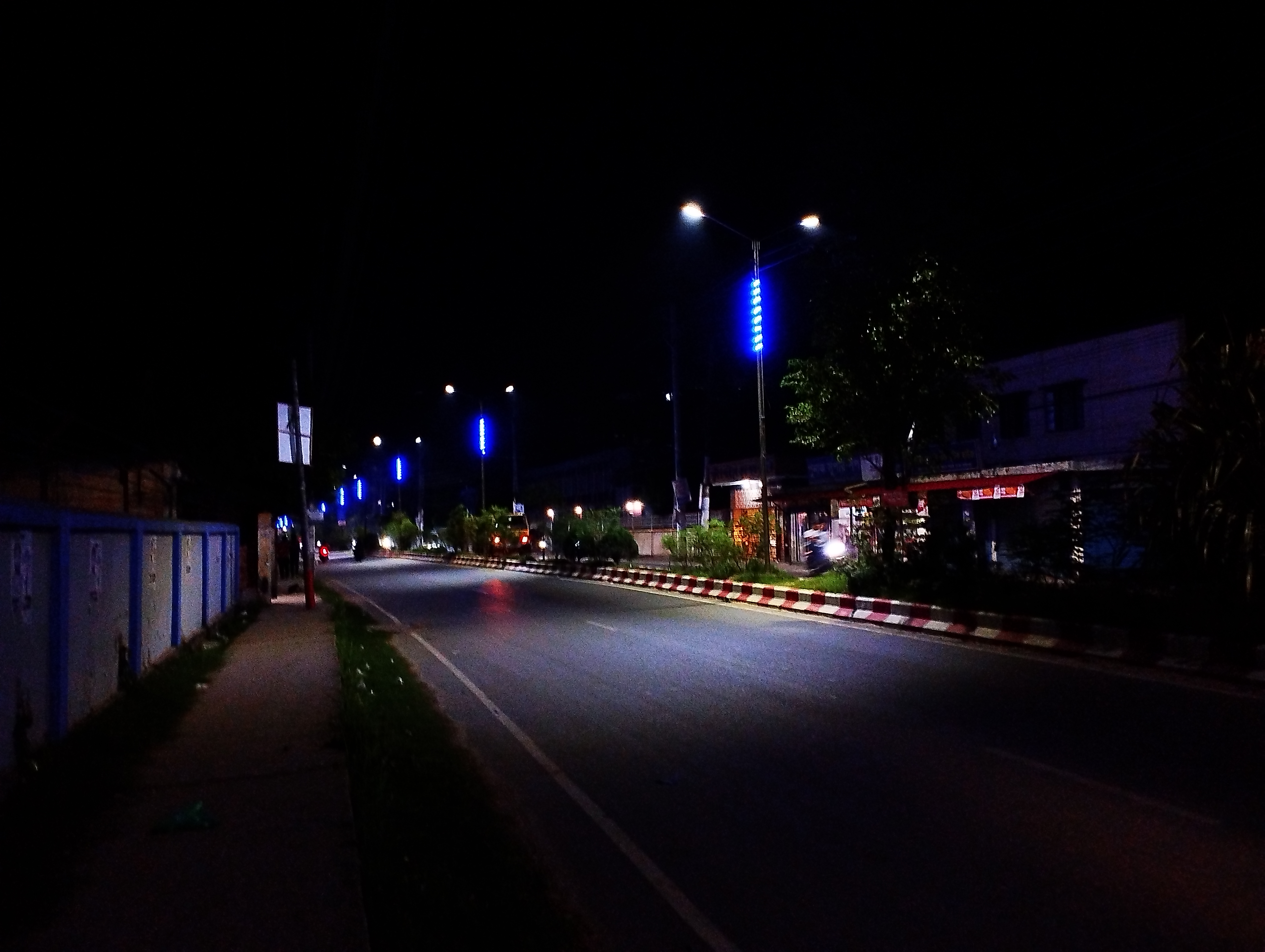
- In front of Faridpur District Superintendent of Police office

Route information
- Length: 6.130 km (3.809 mi)

Major junctions
- West end: N804 (Bhanga road junction)
- East end: Faridpur C&B Ghat

Location
- Country: Bangladesh

Highway system
- Roads in Bangladesh
← N804

N803 (Bangladesh) is a national highway of Bangladesh located in Faridpur. The total length of this highway is 6.130 kilometres (3.809 mi).
