= N809 (Bangladesh) =

National Highway in Bangladesh

N809
- Barishal-Laherhat-Veduria-Bhola-Illisha-Maju Chowdhuryhat-Lakshmipur Road

Route information
- Length: 68 km (42 mi)

Major junctions
- Barishal end: near University of Barishal
- N8 - Barishal; R890 - Bhola; R140 / R147 - Lakshmipur
- Lakshmipur end: Lakshmipur

Location
- Country: Bangladesh

Highway system
- Roads in Bangladesh
| ← N806 | → N1 |

The N809 or Barishal-Bhola-Lakshmipur Highway is a Bangladeshi National Highway between the divisional city of Barishal and the town of Lakshmipur, via the town of Bhola. It starts from the N8 near University of Barishal and ends at R140 (Comilla-Lalmai-Chandpur-Lakhmipur-Begumganj Road) in Lakshmipur.

== See also ==
- N8 (Bangladesh)
- List of roads in Bangladesh
