= N804 (Bangladesh) =

Bangladeshi national highway

N804
- Dhaka–Faridpur Highway; Bhanga - Faridpur Highway

Route information
- Part of AH1
- Length: 32 km (20 mi)

Major junctions
- Bhanga end: Bhanga Interchange
- N8 / N805 - Bhanga Interchange; Z8402 - Joyar Mor; N7 - Bangabandhu Square
- Faridpur end: Alipur

Location
- Country: Bangladesh

Highway system
- Roads in Bangladesh
← N803	→ N805

N804 or Dhaka- Faridpur Highway is a Bangladeshi national highway connecting Faridpur to Bhanga. It starts at Bhanga Interchange in Bhanga Upazila and ends at Bangabandhu Square at Faridpur.

== See also ==
List of roads in Bangladesh
