= N8 (Bangladesh) =

National Highway in Bangladesh

N8
- Dhaka–Patuakhali Highway
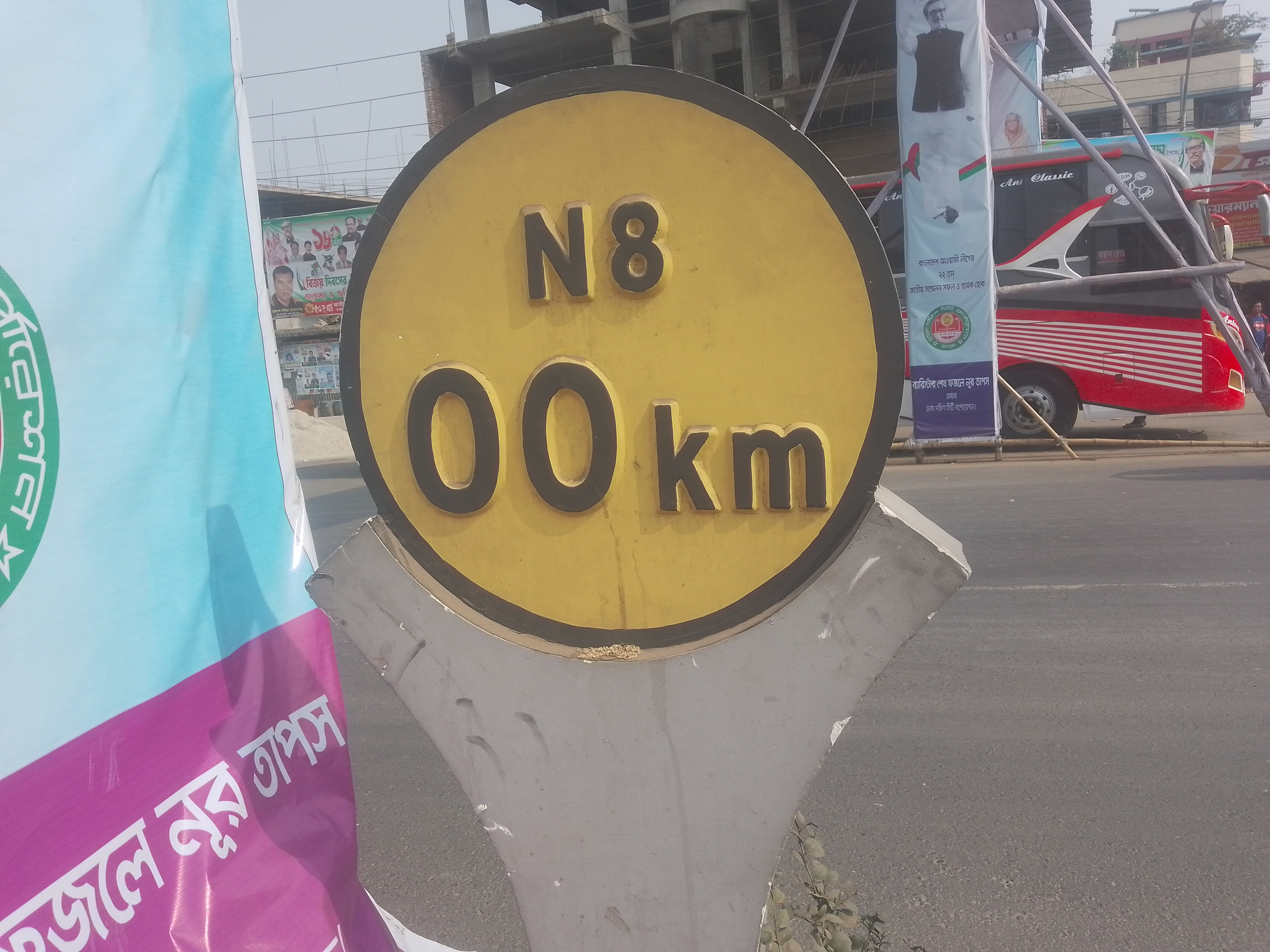

Route information
- Part of AH1
- Length: 202 km (126 mi)

Major junctions
- N1 - Jatrabari; N802 / R810 / R820 - Dhaka; R812 - Mawa; N804 / N805 - Bhanga; R850 - Tekerhat; R860 - Madaripur; N809 / R870 - Barishal

Location
- Country: Bangladesh

Highway system
- Roads in Bangladesh
← N7	→ N101

The N8 is a Bangladeshi National Highway between the capital Dhaka and the town of Patuakhali. It starts from the Jatrabari interchange and ends at the Patuakhali bridge.

== See also ==
- List of roads in Bangladesh
