= Bhanga Upazila =

Bhanga ভাঙ্গা
- Upazila
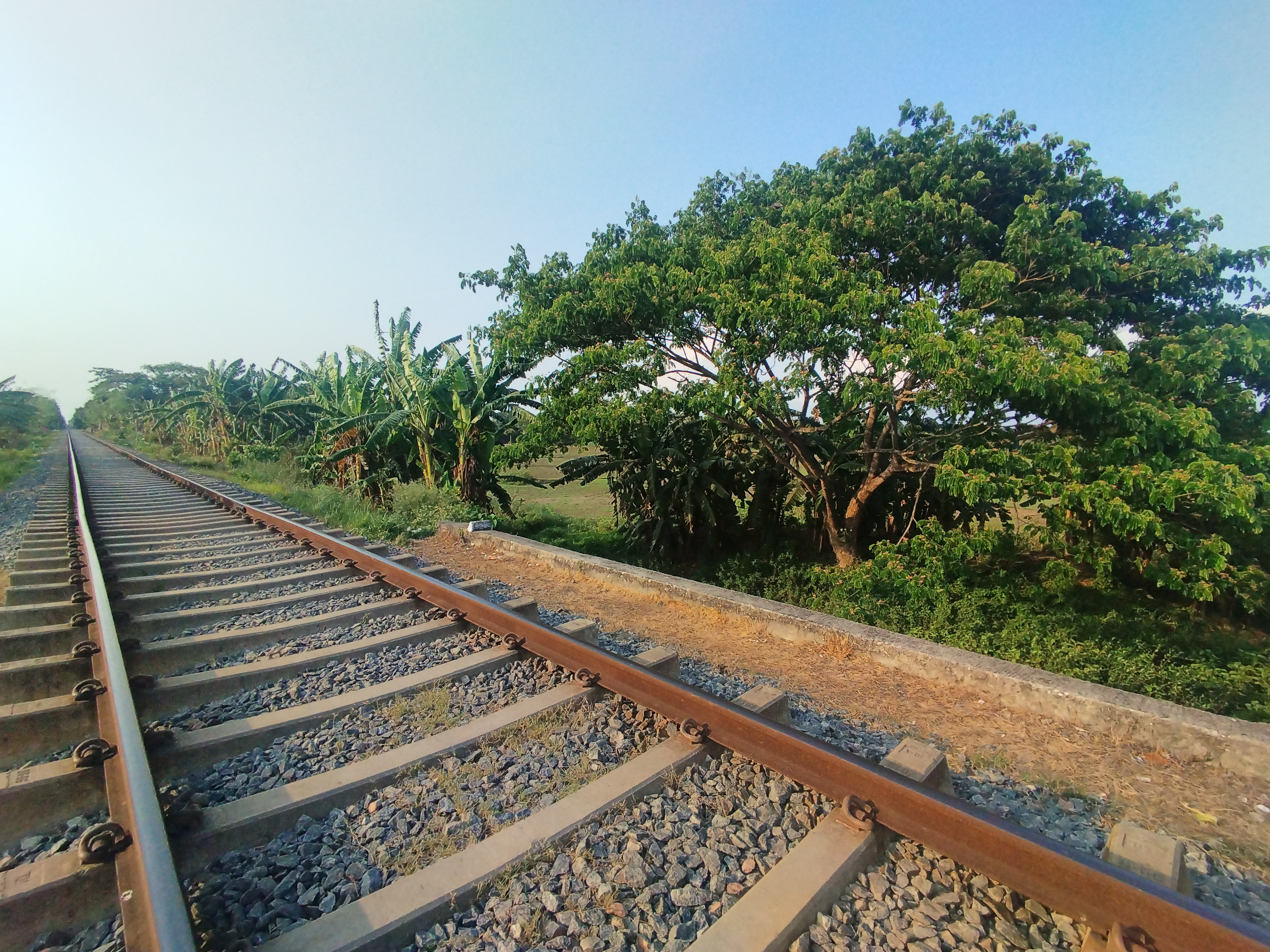
- Pachuria-Bhanga rail line in Pukhuria, Bhanga Upazila

- Coordinates: 23°23′N 89°59′E
- Country: Bangladesh
- Division: Dhaka
- District: Faridpur

Area
  - Total: 215.30 km^{2} (83.13 sq mi)

Population (2022)
  - Total: 293,857
  - Density: 1,364.9/km^{2} (3,535.0/sq mi)
- Time zone: UTC+6 (BST)
- Postal code: 7830
- Area code: 06323
- Website: Official Map of Bhanga

Bhanga Upazila mauza geocode map

Bhanga (Bengali: ভাঙ্গা) is an upazila of Faridpur District in the Division of Dhaka, Bangladesh.

== Geography ==
Bhanga is located at 23.3833°N 89.9833°E. It has 57,164 households and total area 215.30 km^{2}.

== Demographics ==
Religions in Bhanga Upazila (2022)
Religion	Percent
Islam	93.15%
Hinduism	6.84%

According to the 2022 Bangladeshi census, Bhanga Upazila had 72,900 households and a population of 293,857. 9.73% of the population were under 5 years of age. Bhanga had a literacy rate (age 7 and over) of 73.41%: 74.64% for males and 72.32% for females, and a sex ratio of 90.71 males for every 100 females. 53,621 (18.25%) lived in urban areas.

As of the 2011 Census of Bangladesh, Bhanga upazila had 57,164 households and a population of 259,032. 62,224 (24.02%) were under 10 years of age. Bhanga had an average literacy rate of 47.01%, compared to the national average of 51.8%, and a sex ratio of 1067 females per 1000 males. 46,477 (17.94%) of the population lived in urban areas.

As of the 1991 Bangladesh census, Bhanga has a population of 214702. Males constitute 50.23% of the population, and females 49.77%. This Upazila's eighteen up population is 105762. Bhanga has an average literacy rate of 25.7% (7+ years), and the national average of 32.4% literate.

== Administration ==
Bhanga Upazila is divided into Bhanga Municipality and 12 union parishads: Algi, Azimnagor, Chandra, Chumurdi, Gharua, Hamirdi, Kalamridha, Kawlibera, Manikdha, Nasirabad, Nurullagonj, and Tujerpur. The union parishads are subdivided into 136 mauzas and 206 villages.

Bhanga Municipality is subdivided into 9 wards and 26 mahallas.

- Upazila Chairman: S M Habibur Rahman Al Habib
- Upazila Nirbahi Officer (UNO): Md. Alamgir Hussein

== Education ==
According to Banglapedia, Bhanga Model Govt. Pilot High School, founded in 1889, Sadardi High School (1917), and Kalamridha Govinda High School (1927), are notable secondary schools.

- Madhobpur Technical and B.M College
- Kazi Wali Ullah High School
- Kazi Mahbubullah (K.M) College
- Bhanga Mohila College
- Kazi Shamsunnesa Girls School
- Deora High School
- Bharilhat Nesaria Dakhilia Madrasa
- Syed Zanal Abdin High School
- Abdulabad High School
- Brahmondi High School
- Sunflower Ideal Academy
- Sonamoyee High School
- Sharifabad High School & college
- Munsurabad Govt. Primary School
- Maligram high School
- Pulia High School
- East Sadardi High School
- Bhanga Model Govt. pilot High School
- Hoglakandi Govt. Primary School.
- Tuzarpur S.A. High School
- Hamirdi Pilot High School
- Purbapara High School
- Maijhail Govt Primary School

== See also ==
- Upazilas of Bangladesh
- Districts of Bangladesh
- Divisions of Bangladesh
