= Roads and Highways Department =

Agency of the Roads and Highways Department

- Formation: 1962
- Type: Government agency
- Legal status: In operation
- Purpose: Construction and maintenance of highways and bridges
- Headquarters: 122/1, Love Road, Tejgaon, Dhaka, Bangladesh
- Region served: Bangladesh
- Chief Engineer: Syed Moinul Hasan
- Parent organization: Ministry of Road Transport and Bridges
- Affiliations: Road Transport and Highways Division
- Website: www.rhd.gov.bd

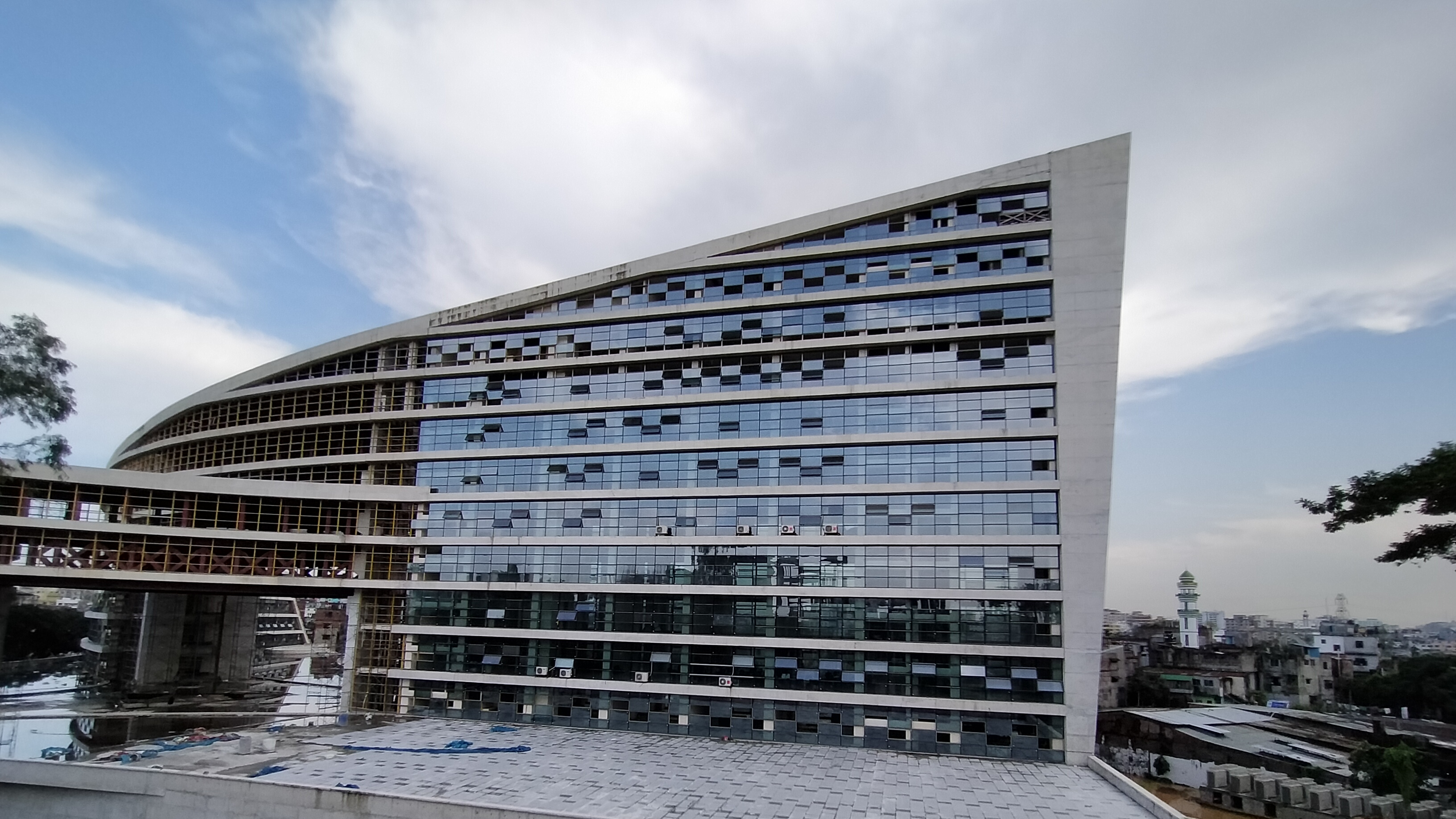
Head office of Roads and Highways Department under construction at South Kunipara, Tejgaon, Dhaka.

The Roads and Highways Department (Bengali: সড়ক ও জনপথ অধিদপ্তর) is an agency of the Government of Bangladesh responsible for the construction and maintenance of highways and bridges across Bangladesh. The department is a subsidiary of the Road Transport and Highways Division, a division of the Ministry of Road Transport and Bridges.

== History ==
Roads and Highways Department was established in 1962 after the Construction & Building organisation was broken into two, the other being Public Works Department. The department is responsible for the construction of roads, highways, and bridges and their upkeep. It also has a broader plan to replace ferry routes with bridges.

== Organization and jurisdiction ==
To ensure efficient management of its activities, the Roads and Highways Department categorizes the entire highway network of Bangladesh into zones, circles, and divisions. The zones are headed by Additional Chief Engineers, circles by Superintending Engineers, and divisions by Executive Engineers. Furthermore, sub-divisions are headed by Sub-Divisional Engineers, while Sub-Assistant Engineers act as section officers for the respective sections.

=== Lengths of the roads by zones, circle and divisons ===
Zone	Circle	Division	Length of Roads in km
Barishal	Barishal	Barishal	353.27
Barishal	Barishal	Bhola	280.96
Barishal	Barishal	Jhalokathi	251.48
Barishal	Barishal	Pirojpur	288.37
Barishal	Patuakhali	Patuakhali	257.18
Barishal	Patuakhali	Barguna	172.68
Chattogram	Chattogram	Chattogram	570.48
Chattogram	Chattogram	Chattogram South	366.53
Chattogram	Chattogram	Cox's Bazar	563.22
Chattogram	Rangamati	Rangamati	224.81
Chattogram	Rangamati	Khagrachhari	388.76
Chattogram	Rangamati	Bandarban	552.55
Cumilla	Cumilla	Cumilla	870.94
Cumilla	Cumilla	Brahmanbaria	289.82
Cumilla	Cumilla	Chandpur	362.32
Cumilla	Noakhali	Noakhali	541.46
Cumilla	Noakhali	Feni	295.49
Cumilla	Noakhali	Laxmipur	256.51
Dhaka	Dhaka	Dhaka	276.61
Dhaka	Dhaka	Gazipur	412.13
Dhaka	Dhaka	Manikganj	239.49
Dhaka	Narayanganj	Narayanganj	363.30
Dhaka	Narayanganj	Narsingdi	253.41
Dhaka	Narayanganj	Munshiganj	324.74
Gopalganj	Gopalganj	Gopalganj	300.10
Gopalganj	Gopalganj	Shariatpur	142.39
Gopalganj	Gopalganj	Madaripur	216.74
Gopalganj	Faridpur	Faridpur	330.70
Gopalganj	Faridpur	Rajbari	156.65
Khulna	Khulna	Khulna	413.18
Khulna	Khulna	Bagerhat	440.29
Khulna	Khulna	Satkhira	281.65
Khulna	Jashore	Jashore	338.56
Khulna	Jashore	Magura	231.71
Khulna	Jashore	Narail	188.60
Khulna	Kushtia	Jhenaidah	395.64
Khulna	Kushtia	Kushtia	268.82
Khulna	Kushtia	Chuadanga	142.79
Khulna	Kushtia	Meherpur	158.89
Mymensingh	Mymensingh	Mymensingh	569.28
Mymensingh	Mymensingh	Netrakona	368.83
Mymensingh	Mymensingh	Kishoreganj	426.83
Mymensingh	Jamalpur	Jamalpur	348.44
Mymensingh	Jamalpur	Sherpur	319.84
Mymensingh	Jamalpur	Tangail	576.90
Rajshahi	Rajshahi	Rajshahi	426.51
Rajshahi	Rajshahi	Naogaon	475.34
Rajshahi	Rajshahi	Chapai Nawabganj	231.12
Rajshahi	Pabna	Pabna	531.02
Rajshahi	Pabna	Sirajganj	441.80
Rajshahi	Pabna	Natore	357.60
Rajshahi	Bogura	Bogura	422.31
Rajshahi	Bogura	Joypurhat	190.98
Rangpur	Rangpur	Rangpur	386.91
Rangpur	Rangpur	Gaibandha	144.38
Rangpur	Rangpur	Kurigram	276.04
Rangpur	Rangpur	Lalmonirhat	180.11
Rangpur	Dinajpur	Dinajpur	524.96
Rangpur	Dinajpur	Nilphamari	277.91
Rangpur	Dinajpur	Panchagarh	182.75
Rangpur	Dinajpur	Thakurgaon	192.44
Sylhet	Sylhet	Sylhet	554.18
Sylhet	Sylhet	Sunamganj	345.44
Sylhet	Moulvi Bazar	Moulvi Bazar	380.64
Sylhet	Moulvi Bazar	Habiganj	338.78
