= Begum Rokeya Avenue =

Street in Dhaka, Bangladesh

- Begum Rokeya Sarani
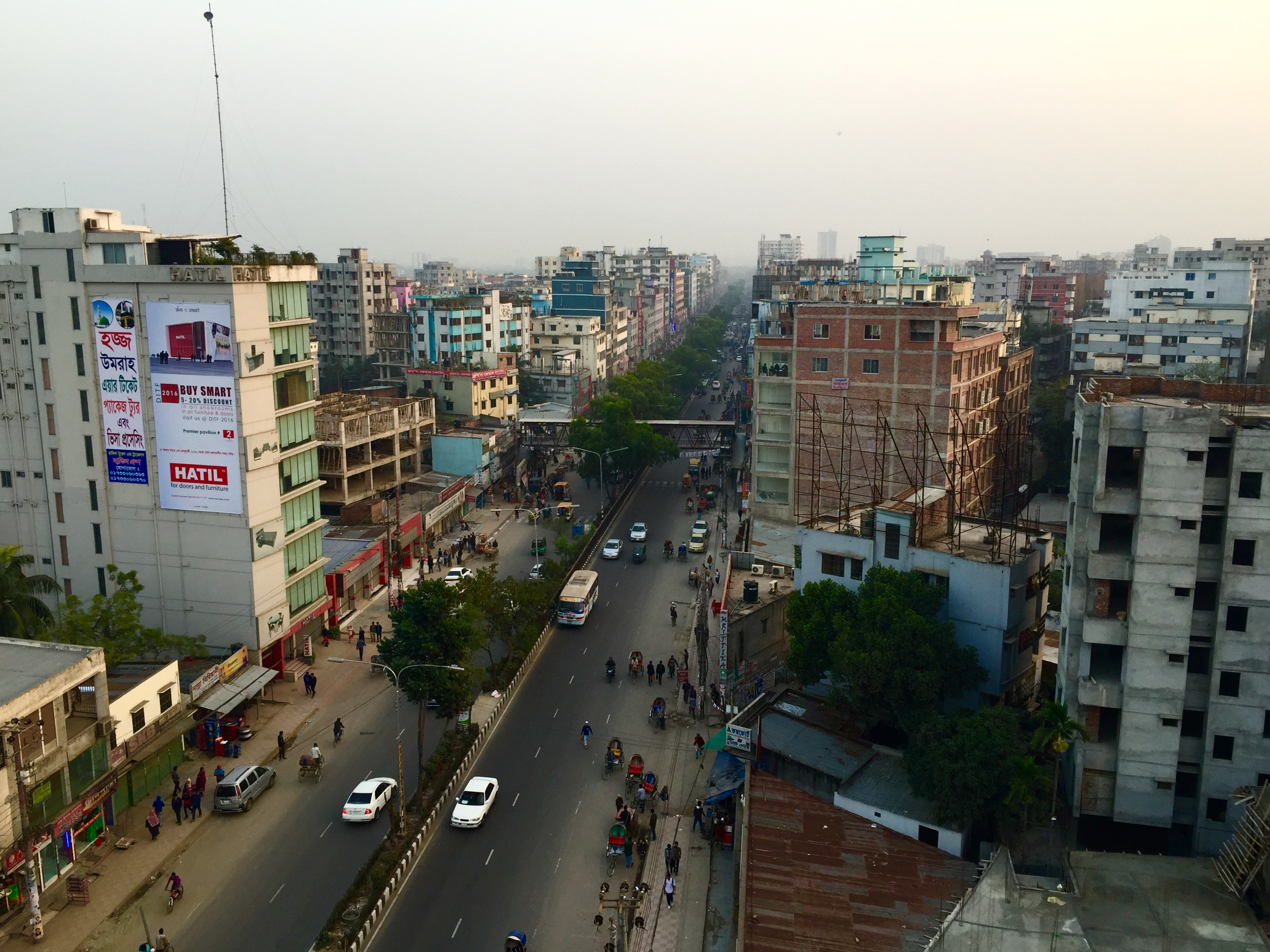
- The avenue in 2016
- Interactive map of Begum Rokeya Avenue
- Native name: বেগম রোকেয়া সরণি (Bengali)
- Namesake: Begum Rokeya
- Type: Street
- Owner: Dhaka North City Corporation
- Location: Mirpur, New Dhaka, Bangladesh
- Nearest metro station: Pallabi; Mirpur 11; Mirpur 10; Kazipara; Shewrapara; Agargaon
- Coordinates: 23.8109956°N 90.3675458°E
- North end: Mirpur DOHS MP Checkpost
- South end: Agargaon intersection
- North: Ahmed Sofa Sarani
- South: Bir Uttam Major General Azizur Rahman Road

Other
- Known for: Furniture market
- Status: Active

Begum Rokeya Avenue is a street located in Mirpur in Dhaka. It is named after the Bengali feminist writer and social reformer Begum Rokeya. The road begins at Shewrapara in the south and extends northward to Mirpur-10. It is the only principal route for entering the Mirpur area from central Dhaka, and public transport uses it to reach the Mirpur-1, Mirpur-10, Mirpur-11, and Mirpur-12 areas. Urbanization in Mirpur increased significantly during the 1970s. Under such circumstances, the street was constructed during the rule of Bangladeshi president Hussain Muhammad Ershad in the 1980s. Upon completion, it brought a fundamental transformation to Mirpur's transportation system and led to major changes in its neighborhoods. The MRT Line 6 of the Dhaka Metro Rail passes through the middle of this street. It is known as the principal street connecting Mirpur with various parts of Dhaka. Although banks, insurance offices, and furniture stores have developed along both sides of the avenue, it is primarily known for its furniture shops.
