= Uttara South metro station =

Metro station in Dhaka

Uttara South উত্তরা দক্ষিণ
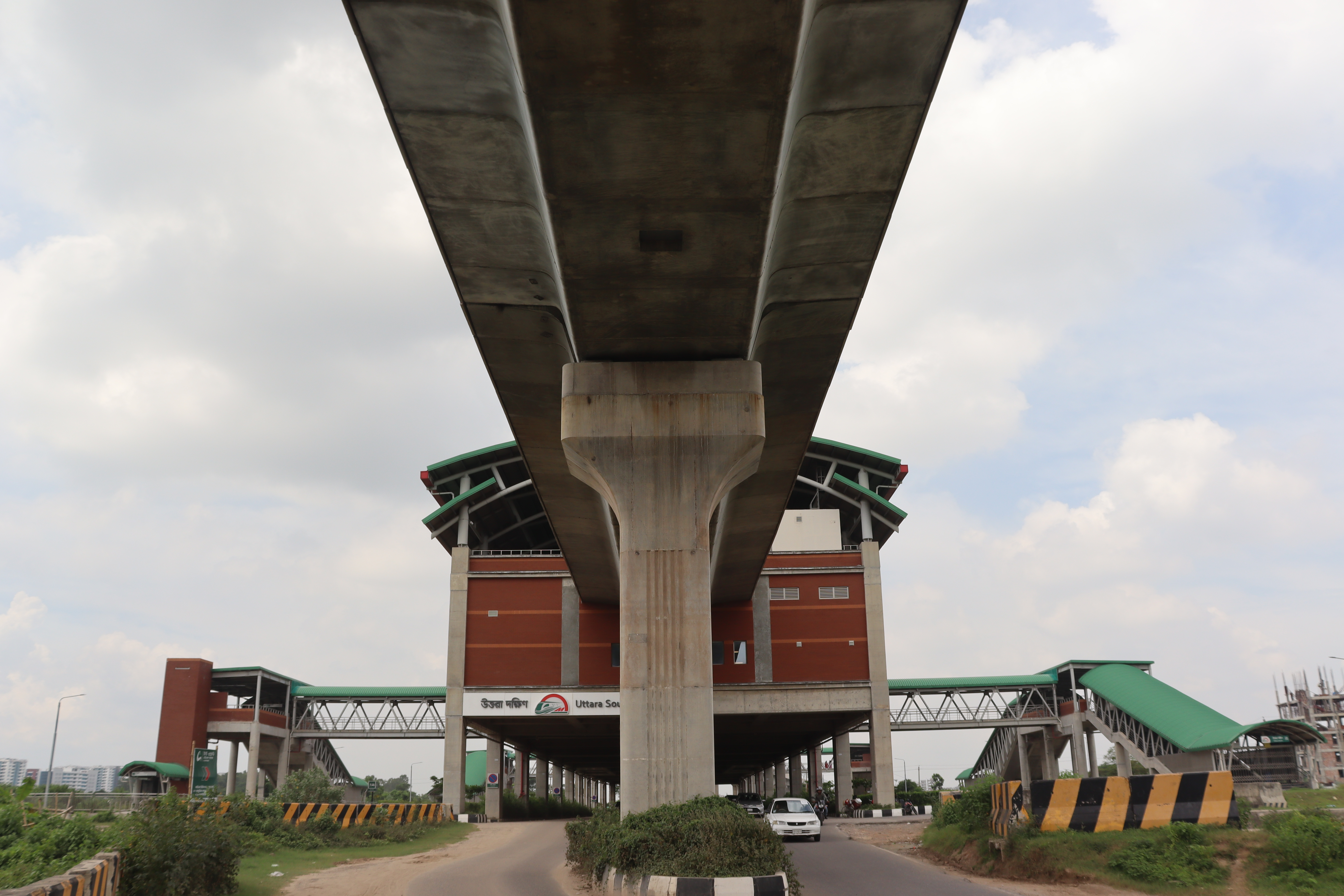
- Station building

General information
- Other names: Station 3
- Location: Metro Circle, Ahmed Sofa Sarani, Sector 17, Uttara, Dhaka; Bangladesh
- Coordinates: 23.84560°N 90.36314°E
- System: Dhaka Metro Rail station
- Owner: Dhaka Mass Transit Company Limited
- Line: MRT Line 6
- Platforms: Side platform
- Tracks: 2

Construction
- Structure type: Elevated
- Platform levels: 3
- Parking: No
- Cycle facilities: No
- Accessible: Yes

History
- Opened: 31 March 2023
- Electrified: 1,500 V DC overhead catenary

Services
Preceding station	Dhaka Metro	Following station
Uttara Center towards Uttara North	MRT Line 6	Pallabi towards Kamalapur
Route map
- Source
Location

Uttara South (Bengali: উত্তরা দক্ষিণ, romanised: Uttora dokkhin) is an elevated metro station of the Dhaka Metro's MRT Line 6. This station is located in Uttara, a neighbourhood of Dhaka. It was estimated that the station would be opened the last week of March 2023. It became operational on 31 March 2023.

== History ==
The Uttara South Metro Station was constructed under "Package CP-03". The notification of application for construction of raised bridges for stations and railways was published on 30 June 2015 and the last date for submission of applications was 9 September 2015. Italian-Thai Development Public Company Limited gets work contract for "Package CP-03". The agreement was sent on 29 March 2016 for NBR investigation and law and parliamentary investigation. The signing ceremony for the agreement package was held on 3 May 2017 at the Pan Pacific Sonargaon Hotel in Dhaka. Construction work started on 2 August 2017.

== Station ==
=== Station layout ===
G	Path level	Exit / Entry
L1	Between	Rent control, station agent, metro card vending machine, crossover
L2	Side platform | Doors will open on the left
L2	Platform 1 Southbound	Towards → Agargaon next station is Pallabi
L2	Platform 2 Northbound	Towards ← Uttara North next station is Uttara Center
L2	Side platform | Doors will open on the left
L2
