= Mirpur 10 metro station =

Metro station in Dhaka

Mirpur 10 মিরপুর ১০
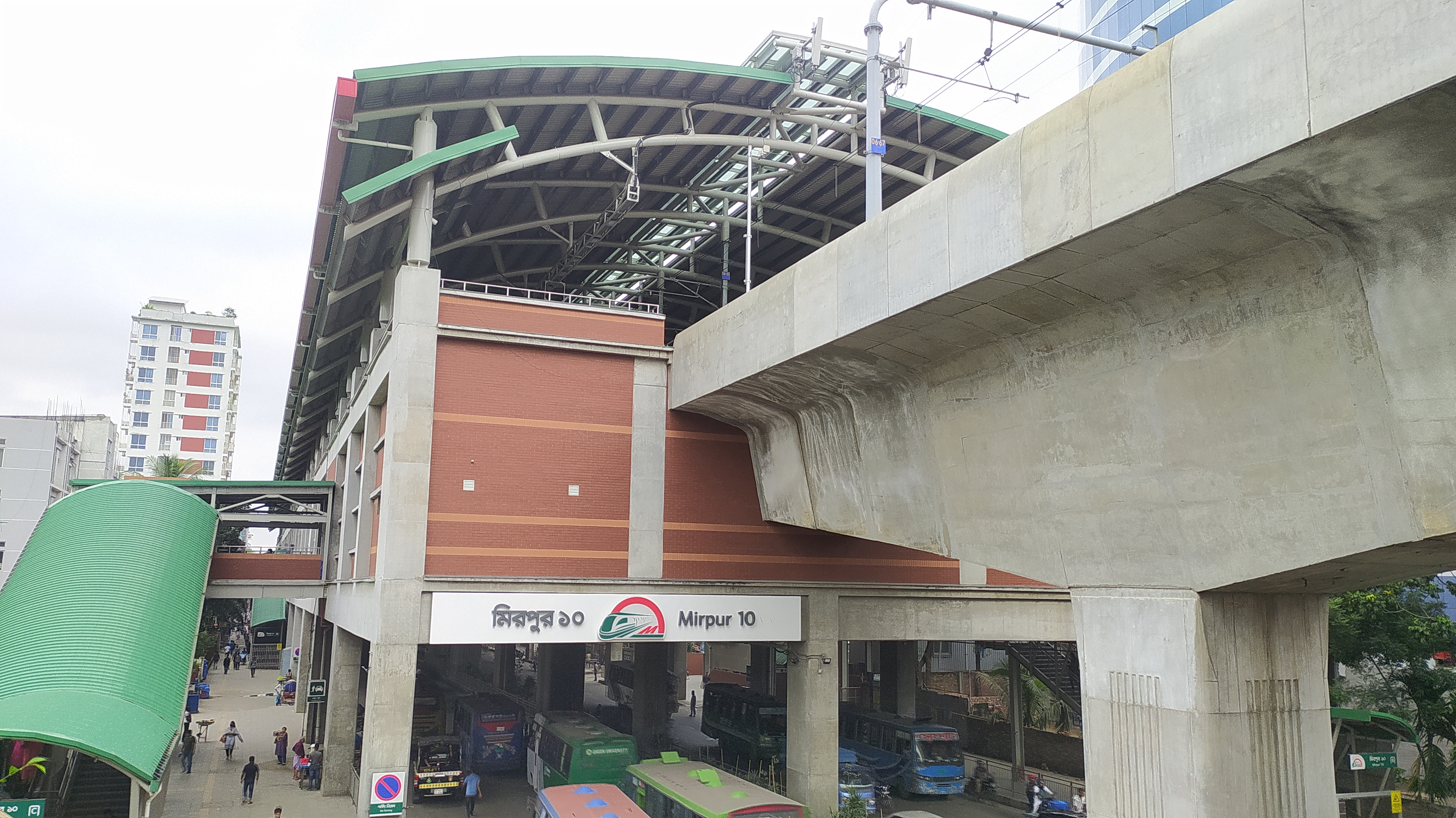

General information
- Other names: Station 6
- Location: Section 10, Mirpur, Dhaka; Bangladesh
- Coordinates: 23.8084°N 90.3682°E
- System: Dhaka Metro Rail station
- Owner: Dhaka Mass Transit Company Limited
- Lines: MRT Line 5N; MRT Line 6
- Platforms: Side platform
- Tracks: 2

Construction
- Structure type: Elevated
- Platform levels: 3
- Parking: No
- Cycle facilities: No
- Accessible: Yes

History
- Opened: 1 March 2023
- Electrified: 1,500 V DC overhead catenary

Services
Preceding station	Dhaka Metro	Following station
Mirpur 1 towards Hemayetpur	MRT Line 5N	Mirpur 14 towards Bhatara
Mirpur 11 towards Uttara North	MRT Line 6	Kazipara towards Kamalapur
Route map
- Source
Location

Mirpur 10 (Bengali: মিরপুর ১০, romanised: Mirpur dosh) is an elevated metro station of the Dhaka Metro's MRT Line 6. This station is located next to Fire Service in Mirpur 10, a neighbourhood of Dhaka, Bangladesh. The station was opened on 1 March 2023.

During the July 2024 Revolution, the station's ticket vending machines and the signalling control section were destroyed in clashes.

== Structure ==
=== Station layout ===
G	Path level	Exit / Entry
L1	Between	Rent control, station agent, metro card vending machine, crossover
L2	Side platform | Doors will open on the left
L2	Platform 1 Southbound	Towards → Agargaon next station is Kazipara
L2	Platform 2 Northbound	Towards ← Uttara North next station is Mirpur 11
L2	Side platform | Doors will open on the left
L2
