= List of Dhaka Metro Rail stations =

Network map of Dhaka Metro Rail

The Dhaka Metro Rail is a mass rapid transit system serving Dhaka, the capital city of Bangladesh. It is owned and operated by the Dhaka Mass Transit Company Limited. Together with a proposed subway system it is expected to reduce traffic congestion in the city. It is part of the Strategic Transport Plan outlined by the Dhaka Transport Coordination Authority.

The network is planned to contain six lines, with the first section of MRT Line 6 commencing commercial operations on 29 December 2022, and the other lines being either in planning or under construction. The construction of MRT Line 6's second section is scheduled to be completed during 2023. The third phase, which will have an interchange with Line 1, Line 2 and Line 4, is set to be completed by 2026. Further expansion of MRT Line 6 is planned, with the hope of extending it towards Tongi in Gazipur metropolitan and Savar Upazila. The fares range from minimum ৳20 to maximum ৳100 (for MRT line 6). Passengers can get 10% discount for paying fares on either MRT pass or Rapid Pass. Each of the cards has same facilities.

== Lines ==
| Line(s) | Number of Stations | Planned Stations | Structure | Opening date |
|---|---|---|---|---|
| 1 | 0 | 21 | 12 underground 9 elevated | Planned |
| 2 | 0 | 25 | Unknown | Planned |
| 4 | 0 | 8 | Unknown | Planned |
| 5 | 0 | 29 | Under Ground and Elevated | Unknown |
| 6 | 16 | 17 | Elevated | 2022 |
| Total: | N/A | N/A | | |

== Operational stations ==
| † | Terminal station |
| * | Transfer station |
| †† | Transfer station to Airport / Bangladesh Railway / Dhaka BRT |

The list gives only operational stations, alphabetically-

| Code | Station Name | | Line | Opened | Layout | Platform Layout | Notes | Refs |
| Code | English | Bengali | Line | Opened | Layout | Platform Layout | Notes | Refs |
|---|---|---|---|---|---|---|---|---|
| G9 | Agargaon | আগারগাঁও | MRT Line 6 | 29 December 2022 | Elevated | Island | – | |
| G15 | Bangladesh Secretariat | বাংলাদেশ সচিবালয় | MRT Line 6 | 5 December 2023 | Elevated | Island | – | |
| G10 | Bijoy Sarani | বিজয় সরণি | MRT Line 6 | 13 December 2023 | Elevated | Side | – | |
| G14 | Dhaka University | ঢাকা বিশ্ববিদ্যালয় | MRT Line 6 | 13 December 2023 | Elevated | Side | – | |
| G11 | Farmgate | ফার্মগেট | MRT Line 6 | 5 December 2023 | Elevated | Island | – | |
| G12 | Karwan Bazar * | কারওয়ান বাজার | MRT Line 6 | 31 December 2023 | Elevated | Side | – | |
| G7 | Kazipara | কাজীপাড়া | MRT Line 6 | 15 March 2023 | Elevated | Side | – | |
| G6 | Mirpur 10 * | মিরপুর ১০ | MRT Line 6 | 1 March 2023 | Elevated | Side | – | |
| G5 | Mirpur 11 | মিরপুর ১১ | MRT Line 6 | 15 March 2023 | Elevated | Side | – | |
| G16 | Motijheel | মতিঝিল | MRT Line 6 | 5 December 2023 | Elevated | Side | – | |
| G4 | Pallabi | পল্লবী | MRT Line 6 | 25 January 2023 | Elevated | Side | – | |
| G13 | Shahbagh | শাহবাগ | MRT Line 6 | 31 December 2023 | Elevated | Island | – | |
| G8 | Shewrapara | শেওড়াপাড়া | MRT Line 6 | 31 March 2023 | Elevated | Side | – | |
| G2 | Uttara Center | উত্তরা সেন্টার | MRT Line 6 | 18 February 2023 | Elevated | Side | – | |
| G1 | Uttara North † | উত্তরা উত্তর | MRT Line 6 | 29 December 2022 | Elevated | Side | – | |
| G3 | Uttara South | উত্তরা দক্ষিণ | MRT Line 6 | 31 March 2023 | Elevated | Side | – | |

== Proposed and under-construction stations ==
=== MRT Line 1 ===
| Station Name | | Status | Layout | Notes | Refs |
| English | Bengali | Status | Layout | Notes | Refs |
|---|---|---|---|---|---|
| Aftabnagar * | আফতাবনগর | Under construction | Underground | Part of the Airport route | |
| Airport | বিমানবন্দর | Under construction | Underground | Part of the Airport route | |
| Airport Terminal 3 | বিমানবন্দর টার্মিনাল ৩ | Under construction | Underground | Part of the Airport route | |
| Badda | বাড্ডা | Under construction | Underground | Part of the Airport route | |
| Boalia | বোয়ালিয়া | Under construction | Elevated | Part of the Purbachal route | |
| Joar Sahara | জোয়ার সাহারা | Under construction | Elevated | Part of the Purbachal route | |
| Kamalapur * | কমলাপুর | Under construction | Elevated | Part of the Airport route | |
| Khilkhet | খিলক্ষেত | Under construction | Underground | Part of the Airport route | |
| Malibagh | মালিবাগ | Under construction | Underground | Part of the Airport route | |
| Mostul | মস্তুল | Under construction | Elevated | Part of the Purbachal route | |
| Nadda | নদ্দা | Under construction | Underground | Part of the Airport and Purbachal routes | |
| North Badda | উত্তর বাড্ডা | Under construction | Underground | Part of the Airport and Purbachal routes | |
| Notun Bazar * | নতুন বাজার | Under construction | Underground | Part of the Airport route | |
| Purbachal Central | পূর্বাচল মধ্য | Under construction | Elevated | Part of the Purbachal route | |
| Purbachal East | পূর্বাচল পূর্ব | Under construction | Elevated | Part of the Purbachal route | |
| Purbachal Terminal | পূর্বাচল টার্মিনাল | Under construction | Elevated | Part of the Purbachal route | |
| Purbachal West | পূর্বাচল পশ্চিম | Under construction | Elevated | Part of the Purbachal route | |
| Rajarbagh | রাজারবাগ | Under construction | Underground | Part of the Airport route | |
| Rampura | রামপুরা | Under construction | Underground | Part of the Airport route | |

=== MRT Line 2 ===
| Station Name | | Status | Layout | Notes | Refs |
| English | Bengali | Status | Layout | Notes | Refs |
|---|---|---|---|---|---|
| Azimpur | আজিমপুর | Planned | – | Part of the main line | |
| Bhuigor | ভুইঘর | Planned | – | Part of the main line | |
| Dakshingaon | দক্ষিণগাঁও | Planned | – | Part of the main line | |
| Dhaka Medical College | ঢাকা মেডিকেল কলেজ | Planned | – | Part of the main line | |
| Dhaka Udyan | ঢাকা উদ্যান | Planned | – | Part of the main line | |
| Dhamripara | ধামড়িপাড়া | Planned | – | Part of the main line | |
| Gabtoli * | গাবতলী | Planned | – | Part of the main line | |
| Golap Shah Mazar | গোলাপ শাহ মাজার | Planned | – | Part of the branch line | |
| Gulistan | গুলিস্তান | Planned | – | Part of the main and branch lines | |
| Jalkury | জালকুড়ি | Planned | – | Part of the main line | |
| Jhigatola | ঝিগাতলা | Planned | – | Part of the main line | |
| Kamalapur * | কমলাপুর | Planned | – | Part of the main line | |
| Manda | মান্ডা | Planned | – | Part of the main line | |
| Mohammadpur | মোহাম্মদপুর | Planned | – | Part of the main line | |
| Motijheel * | মতিঝিল | Planned | – | Part of the main line | |
| Narayanganj | নারায়ণগঞ্জ | Planned | – | Part of the main line | |
| Nayabazar | নয়াবাজার | Planned | – | Part of the branch line | |
| New Market | নিউ মার্কেট | Planned | – | Part of the main line | |
| Palashi | পলাশী | Planned | – | Part of the main line | |
| Sadarghat | সদরঘাট | Planned | – | Part of the branch line | |
| Science Lab | সায়েন্স ল্যাব | Planned | – | Part of the main line | |
| Signboard * | সাইনবোর্ড | Planned | – | Part of the main line | |

=== MRT Line 4 ===
| Station Name | | Status | Layout | Notes | Refs |
| English | Bengali | Status | Layout | Notes | Refs |
|---|---|---|---|---|---|
| Chittagong Road | চট্টগ্রাম রোড | Planned | – | – | |
| Jatrabari | যাত্রাবাড়ী | Planned | – | – | |
| Kamalapur * | কমলাপুর | Planned | – | – | |
| Kanchpur | কাঁচপুর | Planned | – | – | |
| Madanpur | মদনপুর | Planned | – | – | |
| Sayedabad | সায়েদাবাদ | Planned | – | – | |
| Signboard * | সাইনবোর্ড | Planned | – | – | |
| Shonir Akhra | শনির আখড়া | Planned | – | – | |

=== MRT Line 5 ===
| Station Name | | Status | Layout | Notes | Refs |
| English | Bengali | Status | Layout | Notes | Refs |
|---|---|---|---|---|---|
| Aftabnagar | আফতাবনগর | Planned | Underground | Southern Route | |
| Aftabnagar Centre | আফতাবনগর সেন্টার | Planned | Elevated | Southern Route | |
| Aftabnagar East | আফতাবনগর পশ্চিম | Planned | Elevated | Southern Route | |
| Amin Bazar | আমিনবাজার | Planned | Elevated | Northern Route | |
| Asad Gate | আসাদ গেট | Planned | Underground | Southern Route | |
| Baliarpur | বালিয়ারপুর | Planned | Elevated | Northern Route | |
| Banani | বনানী | Planned | Underground | Northern Route | |
| Bilamalia | বিলামালিয়া | Planned | Elevated | Northern Route | |
| College Gate | কলেজ গেট | Planned | Underground | Southern Route | |
| Darus Salam | দারুস সালাম | Planned | Underground | Northern Route | |
| Dasherkandi | দাশেরকান্দি | Planned | Elevated | Southern Route | |
| Gabtoli * | গাবতলী | Planned | Underground | Northern and Southern Route | |
| Gulshan 2 | গুলশান ২ | Planned | Underground | Northern Route | |
| Hatirjheel | হাতিরঝিল | Planned | Underground | Southern Route | |
| Hemayetpur | হেমায়েতপুর | Planned | Elevated | Northern Route | |
| Kallyanpur | কল্যাণপুর | Planned | Underground | Southern Route | |
| Karwan Bazar * | কারওয়ান বাজার | Opened for MRT Line 6 | Underground | Southern Route | |
| Kochukhet | কচুক্ষেত | Planned | Underground | Northern Route | |
| Mirpur 1 | মিরপুর ১ | Planned | Underground | Northern Route | |
| Mirpur 10 * | মিরপুর ১০ | Opened for MRT Line 6 | Underground | Northern Route | |
| Mirpur 14 | মিরপুর ১৪ | Planned | Underground | Northern Route | |
| Nasirabad | নাসিরাবাদ | Planned | Elevated | Southern Route | |
| Notun Bazar * | নতুন বাজার | Planned | Underground | Northern Route | |
| Russel Square | রাসেল স্কয়ার | Planned | Underground | Southern Route | |
| Shyamoli | শ্যামলী | Planned | Underground | Southern Route | |
| Technical | টেকনিক্যাল | Planned | Underground | Southern Route | |
| Tejgaon | তেজগাঁও | Planned | Underground | Southern Route | |
| Vatara | ভাটারা | Planned | Elevated | Northern Route | |

=== MRT Line 6 ===
| Station Name | | Status | Layout | Notes | Refs |
| English | Bengali | Status | Layout | Notes | Refs |
|---|---|---|---|---|---|
| Kamalapur | কমলাপুর | Under construction | Elevated | | |
