= Kazipara metro station =

Metro rail station in Dhaka

Kazipara কাজীপাড়া
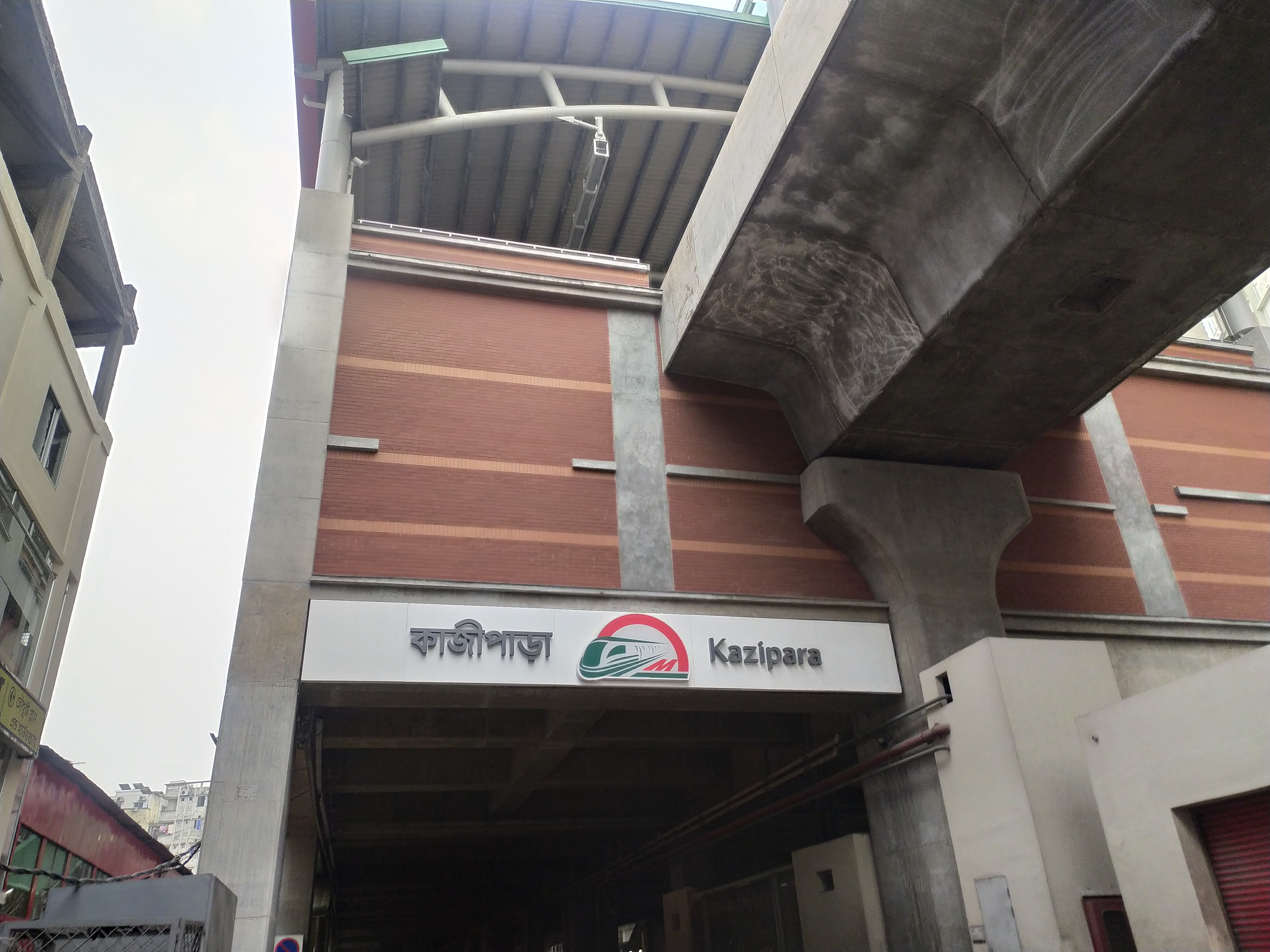

General information
- Other names: Station 7
- Location: Kazipara, Dhaka; Bangladesh
- Coordinates: 23.7992°N 90.3720°E
- System: Dhaka Metro Rail station
- Owner: Dhaka Mass Transit Company Limited
- Line: MRT Line 6
- Platforms: Side platform
- Tracks: 2

Construction
- Structure type: Elevated
- Platform levels: 3
- Parking: No
- Cycle facilities: No
- Accessible: Yes

History
- Opened: 15 March 2023
- Electrified: 1,500 V DC overhead catenary

Services
| Preceding station | Dhaka Metro | Following station |
|---|---|---|
| Mirpur 10 towards Uttara North | MRT Line 6 | Shewrapara towards Kamalapur |
Route map
- Source
Location

Kazipara (Bengali: কাজীপাড়া, romanised: Kajeepara) is a metro station of the Dhaka Metro's MRT Line 6. This station is located in Kazipara, Dhaka, Bangladesh. The station commenced operation from 15 March 2023.

== Station ==
=== Station layout ===
| G | Path level | Exit / Entry |
| L1 | Between | Rent control, station agent, metro card vending machine, crossover |
| L2 | Side platform | Doors will open on the left |
| L2 | Platform 1 Southbound | Towards → Agargaon next station is Shewrapara |
| L2 | Platform 2 Northbound | Towards ← Uttara North next station is Mirpur 10 |
| L2 | Side platform | Doors will open on the left |
| L2 |
