= Mirpur 11 metro station =

Metro station in Dhaka

Mirpur 11 মিরপুর ১১
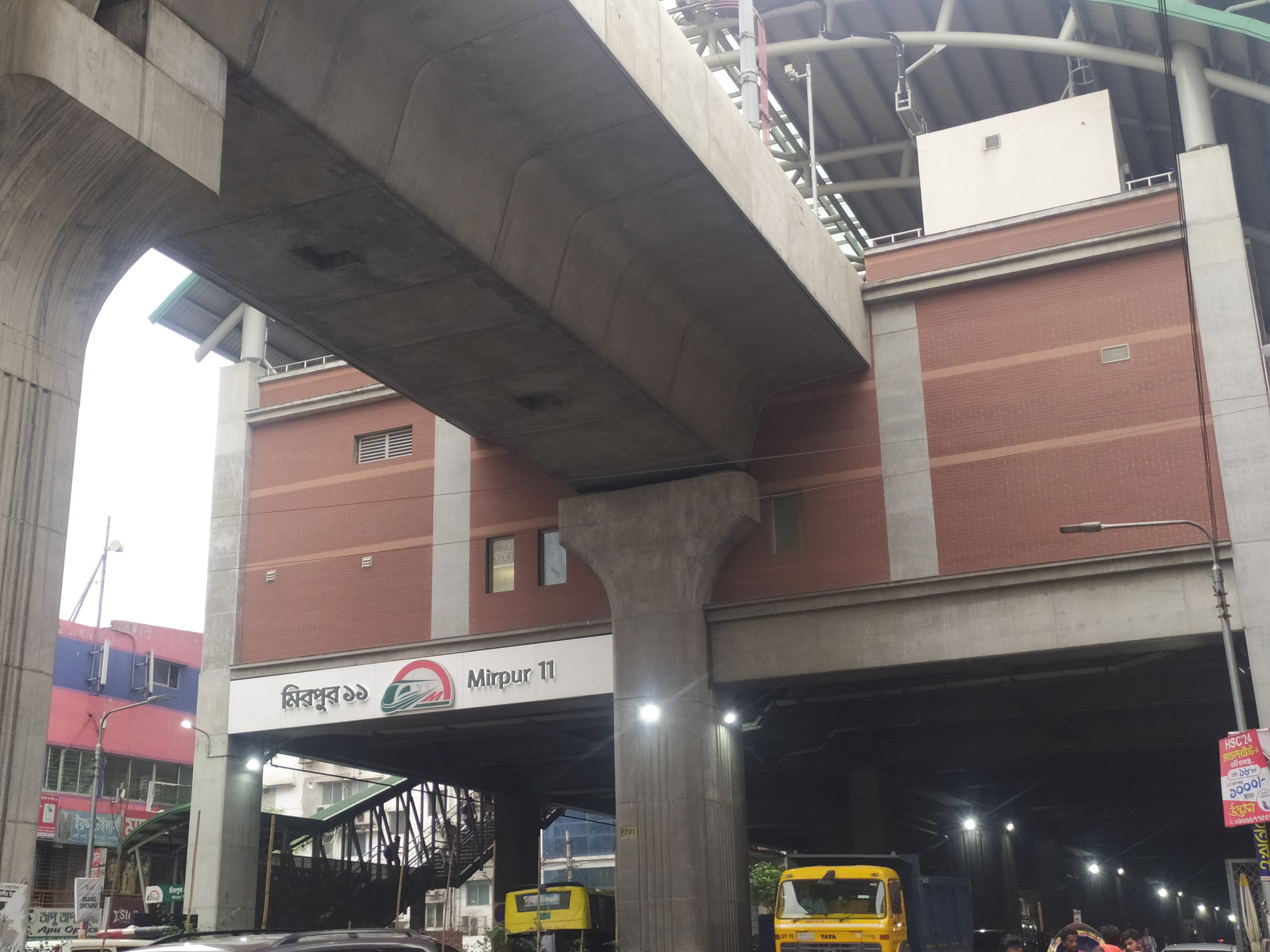

General information
- Other names: Station 5
- Location: Section 11, Mirpur, Dhaka; Bangladesh
- Coordinates: 23.8191°N 90.3653°E
- System: Dhaka Metro Rail station
- Owner: Dhaka Mass Transit Company Limited
- Line: MRT Line 6
- Platforms: Side platform
- Tracks: 2

Construction
- Structure type: Elevated
- Platform levels: 3
- Parking: No
- Cycle facilities: No
- Accessible: Yes

History
- Opened: 15 March 2023
- Electrified: 1,500 V DC overhead catenary

Services
Preceding station	Dhaka Metro	Following station
Pallabi towards Uttara North	MRT Line 6	Mirpur 10 towards Kamalapur
Route map
- Source
Location

Mirpur 11 (Bengali: মিরপুর ১১, romanised: Mirpur egaro) is an elevated metro station of the Dhaka Metro's MRT Line 6. This station is located in Mirpur, a neighbourhood of Dhaka, Bangladesh. The station commenced operation from 15 March 2023.

== Station ==
=== Station layout ===
G	Path level	Exit / Entry
L1	Between	Rent control, station agent, metro card vending machine, crossover
L2	Side platform | Doors will open on the left
L2	Platform 1 Southbound	Towards → Agargaon next station is Mirpur 10
L2	Platform 2 Northbound	Towards ← Uttara North next station is Pallabi
L2	Side platform | Doors will open on the left
L2
