= Bijoy Sarani metro station =

Metro station in Dhaka

Bijoy Sarani বিজয় সরণি
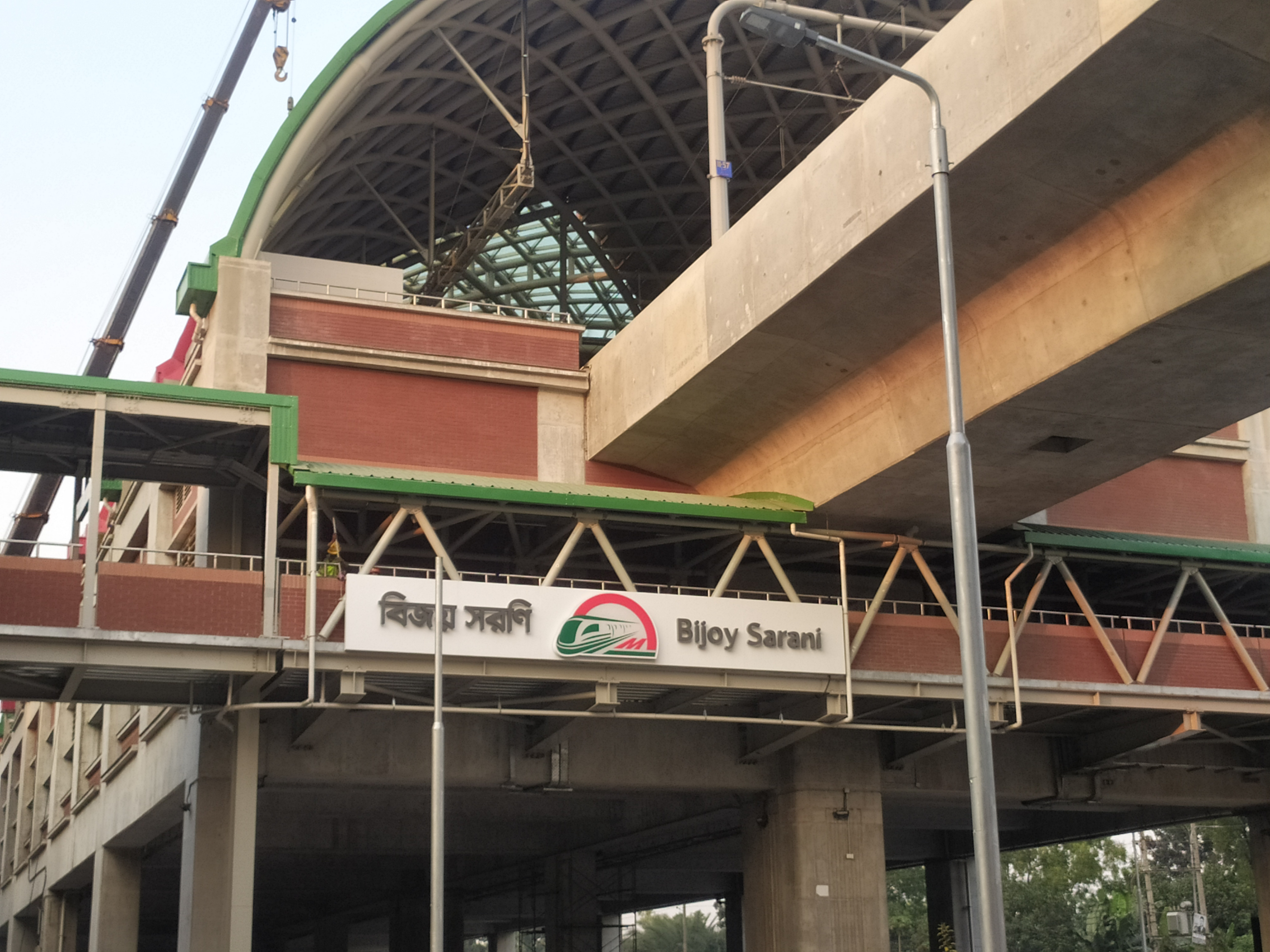
- Station building

General information
- Other names: Station 10
- Location: Bijoy Sarani, Tejgaon Thana, Dhaka; Bangladesh
- Coordinates: 23.7663759°N 90.3762934°E
- System: Dhaka Metro Rail station
- Owner: Dhaka Mass Transit Company Limited
- Line: MRT Line 6
- Platforms: Side platform
- Tracks: 2

Construction
- Structure type: Elevated
- Platform levels: 3
- Parking: No
- Cycle facilities: No
- Accessible: Yes

History
- Opened: 13 December 2023
- Electrified: 1,500 V DC overhead catenary

Services
Preceding station	Dhaka Metro	Following station
Agargaon towards Uttara North	MRT Line 6	Farmgate towards Kamalapur
Route map
- Source
Location

Bijoy Sarani (Bengali: বিজয় সরণি, romanised: Bijoy Shoroni) is an elevated metro station of the Dhaka Metro's MRT Line 6. This station is located in the area of Tejgaon Thana. The station began its service on 13 December 2023.

== History ==
The proposed station at Bijoy Sarani was to be built in front of the Bangabandhu Military Museum, but due to the objection of the Bangladesh Air Force in 2011, it was planned to be built near the Jatiya Sangsad Bhaban.

It was constructed under "Package CP-03". The notification of application for construction of raised bridges for stations and railways was published on 30 June 2015 and the last date for submission of applications was 9 September 2015. The Italian-Thai Development Public Company Limited received the work contract for "Package CP-03". The agreement was signed in a ceremony on 3 May 2017, and construction work started on 2 August 2017. The station opened to the public in December 2023.

== Station ==
=== Station layout ===
G	Path level	Exit / Entry
L1	Between	Rent control, station agent, metro card vending machine, crossover
L2	Side platform no. 1, the left door will open
L2	Southbound	towards → Farmgate
L2	Northbound	→towards ←Agargaon←
L2	Side platform no. 2, the left door will open
L2
