= Pallabi metro station =

Metro station in Dhaka

Pallabi পল্লবী
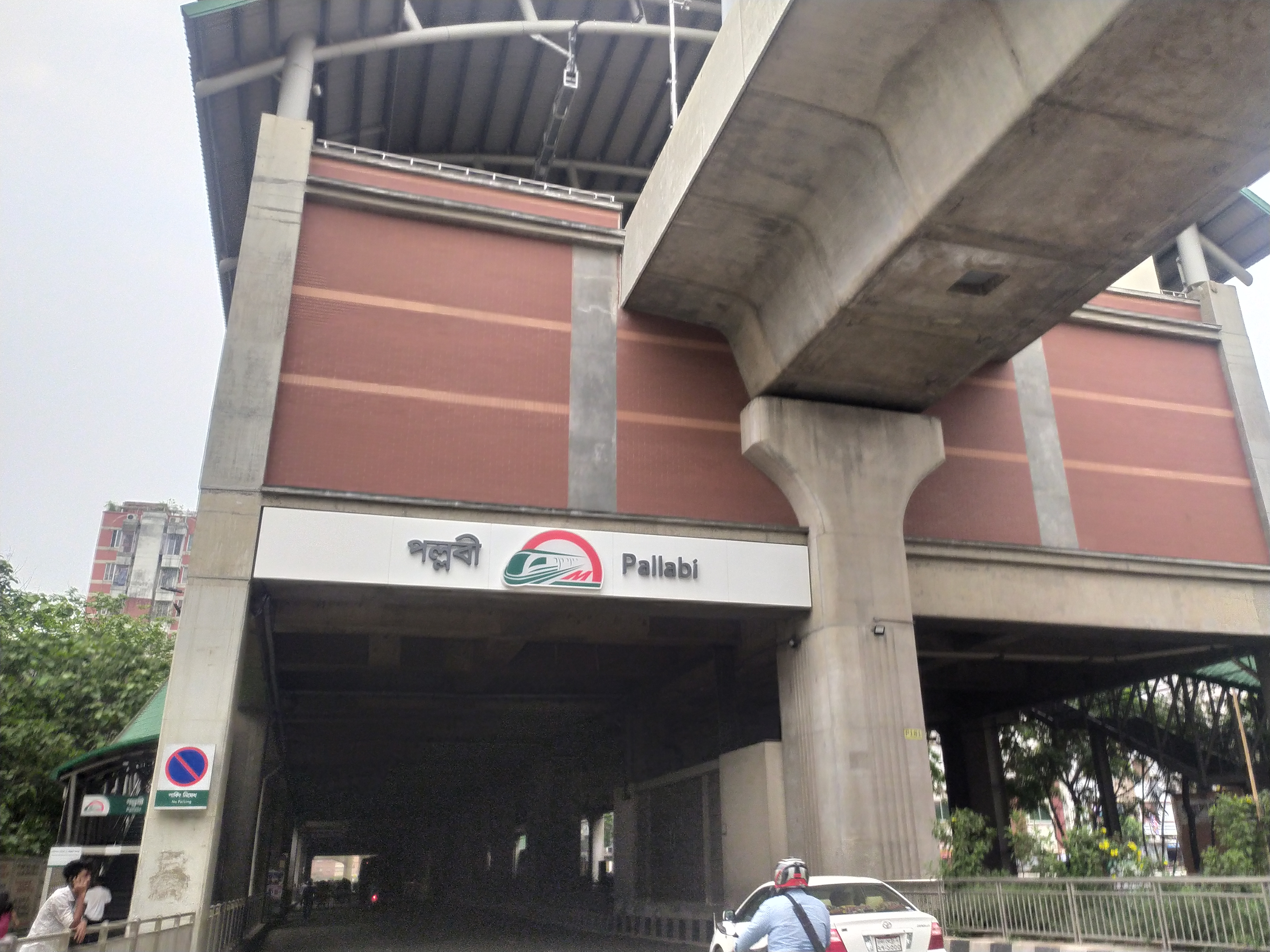

General information
- Other names: Station 4
- Location: Pallabi, Dhaka; Bangladesh
- Coordinates: 23.8262°N 90.3642°E
- System: Dhaka Metro Rail station
- Owner: Dhaka Mass Transit Company Limited
- Line: MRT Line 6
- Platforms: Side platform
- Tracks: 2

Construction
- Structure type: Elevated
- Platform levels: 3
- Parking: No
- Cycle facilities: No
- Accessible: Yes

History
- Opened: 25 January 2023
- Electrified: 1,500 V DC overhead catenary

Services
Preceding station	Dhaka Metro	Following station
Uttara South towards Uttara North	MRT Line 6	Mirpur 11 towards Kamalapur
Route map
- Source
Location

Pallabi (Bengali: পল্লবী, romanised: Pollobee) is an elevated metro station of the Dhaka Metro's MRT Line 6. This station is located at Pallabi, Dhaka. The station was opened on 25 January 2023.

== Station ==
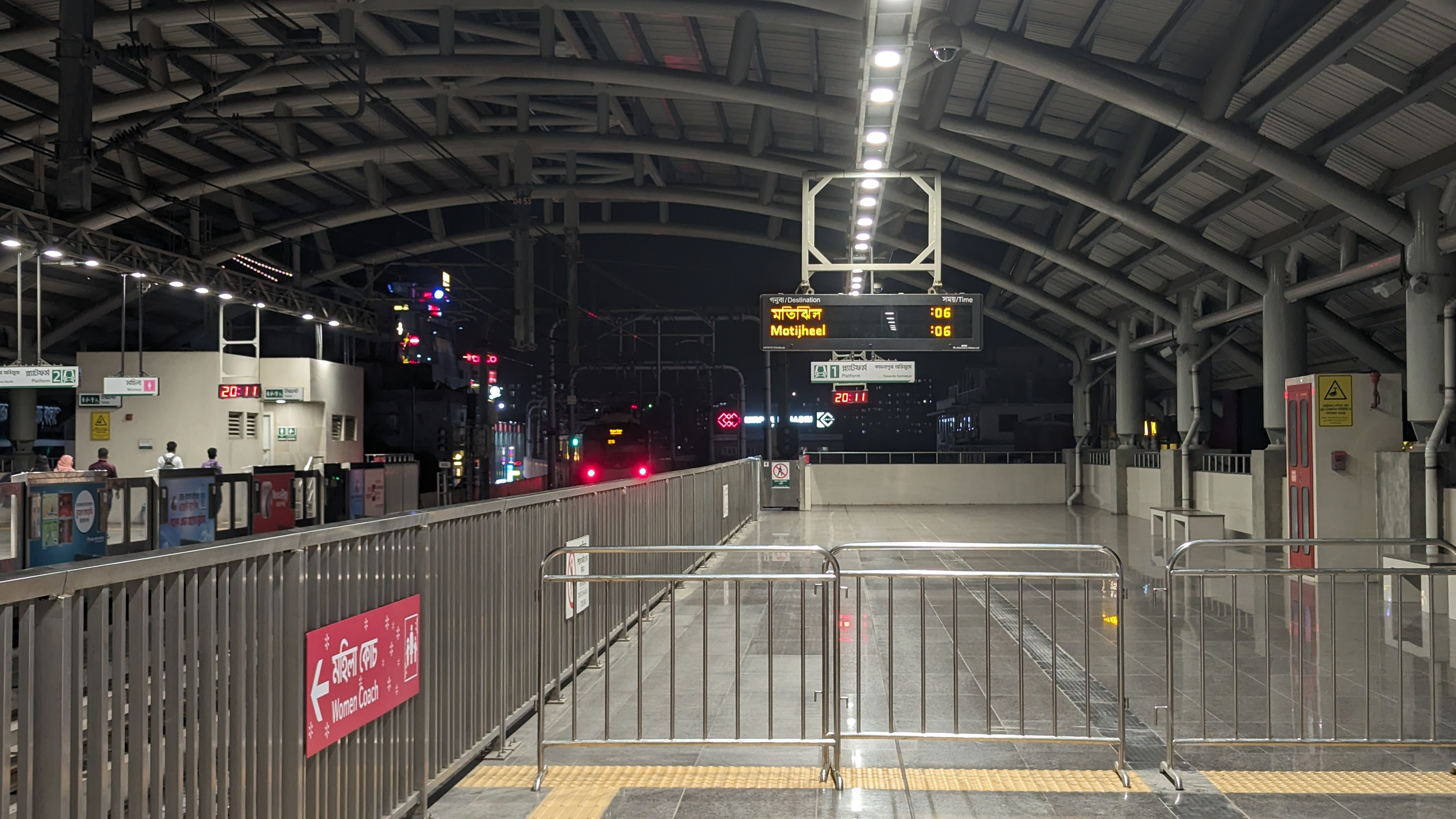
Inside of Pallabi Station

=== Station layout ===
G	Path level	Exit / Entry
L1	Between	Rent control, station agent, metro card vending machine, crossover
L2	Side platform | Doors will open on the left
L2	Platform 1 Southbound	Towards → Agargaon next station is Mirpur 11
L2	Platform 2 Northbound	Towards ← Uttara North next station is Uttara South
L2	Side platform | Doors will open on the left
L2
