= Shewrapara metro station =

Metro rail station in Dhaka

Shewrapara শেওড়াপাড়া
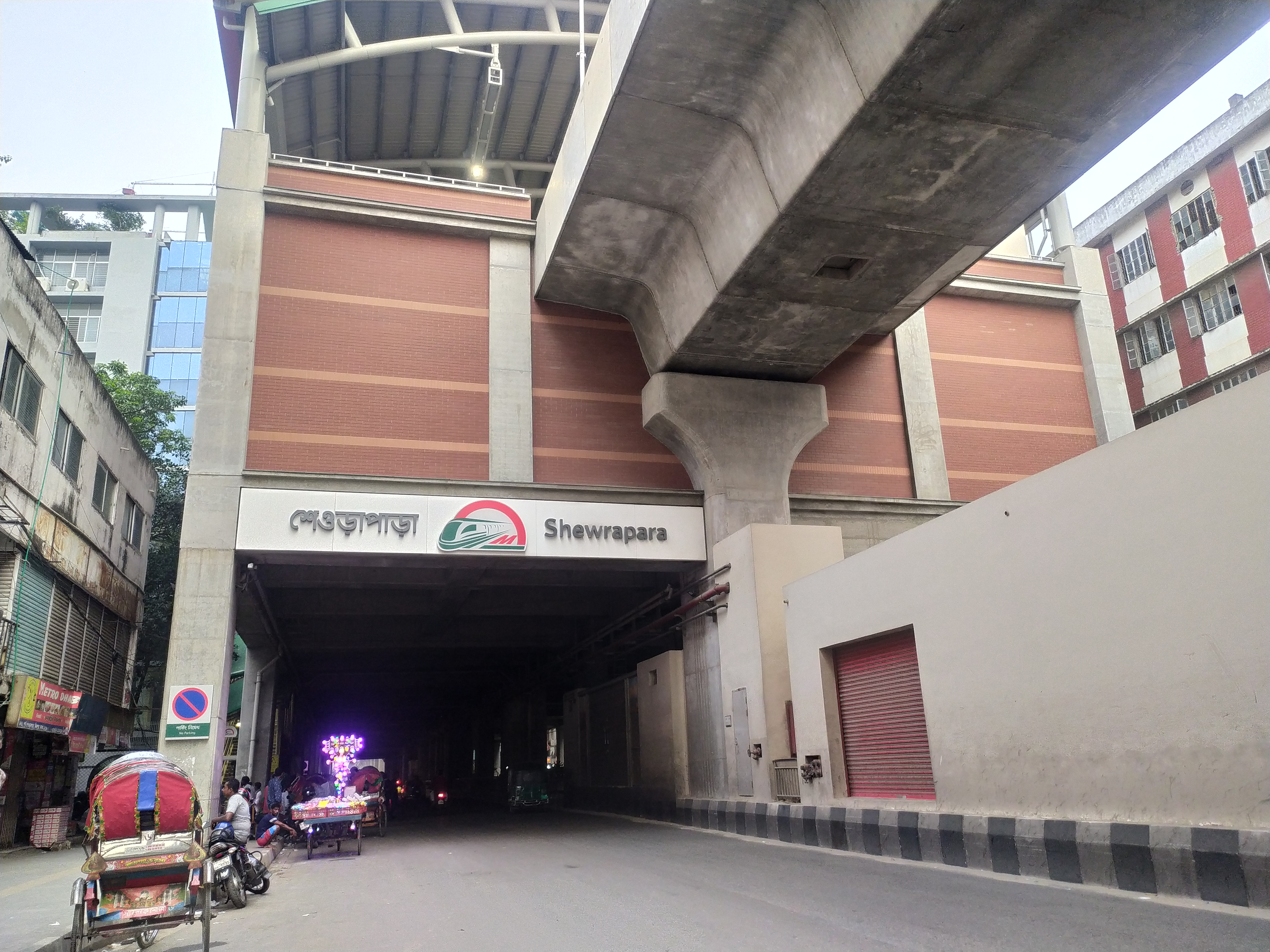

General information
- Other names: Station 8
- Location: Shewrapara, Dhaka; Bangladesh
- Coordinates: 23.7909°N 90.3755°E
- System: Dhaka Metro Rail station
- Owner: Dhaka Mass Transit Company Limited
- Line: MRT Line 6
- Platforms: Side platform
- Tracks: 2

Construction
- Structure type: Elevated
- Platform levels: 3
- Parking: No
- Cycle facilities: No
- Accessible: Yes

History
- Opened: 31 March 2023
- Electrified: 1,500 V DC overhead catenary

Services
Preceding station	Dhaka Metro	Following station
Kazipara towards Uttara North	MRT Line 6	Agargaon towards Kamalapur
Route map
- Source
Location

Shewrapara (Bengali: শেওড়াপাড়া, romanised: Sheorapara) is an elevated metro station of the Dhaka Metro's MRT Line 6. This station is located in Shewrapara, Dhaka. It became operational from 31 March 2023.

== Station ==
=== Station layout ===
G	Path level	Exit / Entry
L1	Between	Rent control, station agent, metro card vending machine, crossover
L2	Side platform | Doors will open on the left
L2	Platform 1 Southbound	Towards → Agargaon
L2	Platform 2 Northbound	Towards ← Uttara North next station is Kazipara
L2	Side platform | Doors will open on the left
L2
