= Uttara Center metro station =

Metro station in Dhaka

Uttara Center উত্তরা সেন্টার
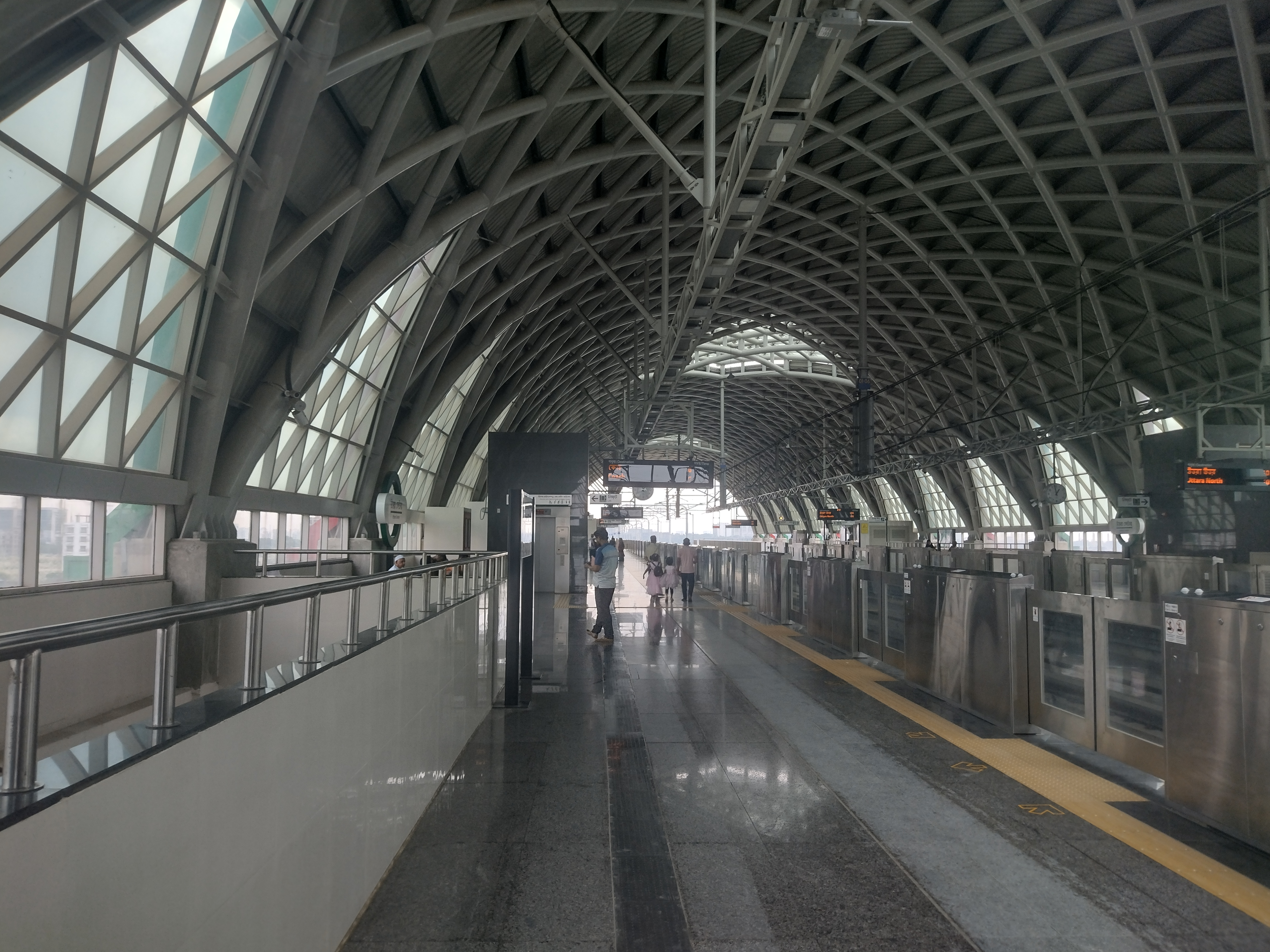
- Platform hall

General information
- Other names: Station 2
- Location: Ahmed Sofa Sarani, Sector 17, Uttara, Dhaka; Bangladesh
- Coordinates: 23.8598°N 90.3651°E
- System: Dhaka Metro Rail station
- Owner: Dhaka Mass Transit Company Limited
- Line: MRT Line 6
- Platforms: Side platform
- Tracks: 2

Construction
- Structure type: Elevated
- Platform levels: 3
- Parking: No
- Cycle facilities: No
- Accessible: Yes

History
- Opened: 18 February 2023
- Electrified: 1,500 V DC overhead catenary

Services
Preceding station	Dhaka Metro	Following station
Uttara North Terminus	MRT Line 6	Uttara South towards Kamalapur
Route map
- Source
Location

Uttara Center (Bengali: উত্তরা সেন্টার romanised: Uttora sentar) is an elevated metro station of the Dhaka Metro's MRT Line 6, located in Uttara, neighbourhood of Dhaka. The station commenced operation from 18 February 2023.

== History ==
The Uttara Centre metro station was constructed under "Package CP-03". The notification of application for construction of raised bridges for stations and railways was published on 30 June 2015 and the last date for submission of applications was 9 September 2015. Italian-Thai Development Public Company Limited gets work contract for "Package CP-03". The agreement document was sent to the ministry on 29 March 2016 for NBR investigation and law and parliamentary investigation. The signing ceremony for the agreement package was held on 3 May 2017 at the Pan Pacific Sonargaon Hotel in Dhaka. Construction work started on 2 August 2017.

== Transit Oriented Development Hub ==
There will be a TOD hub in all stations of Metro Rail Line-6. This TOD (Transit Oriented Development) hub houses shops, commercial office etc. According to authority the first TOD hub will be constructed in this station.

== Station ==
=== Station layout ===
G	Path level	Exit / Entry
L1	Between	Rent control, station agent, metro card vending machine, crossover
L2	Side platform | Doors will open on the left
L2	Platform 1 Southbound	Towards → Motijheel next station is Uttara South
L2	Platform 2 Northbound	Towards ← Uttara North
L2	Side platform | Doors will open on the left
L2
