= Bangladesh Air Force Museum =

Air Force Museum
- বাংলাদেশ বিমান বাহিনী যাদুঘর
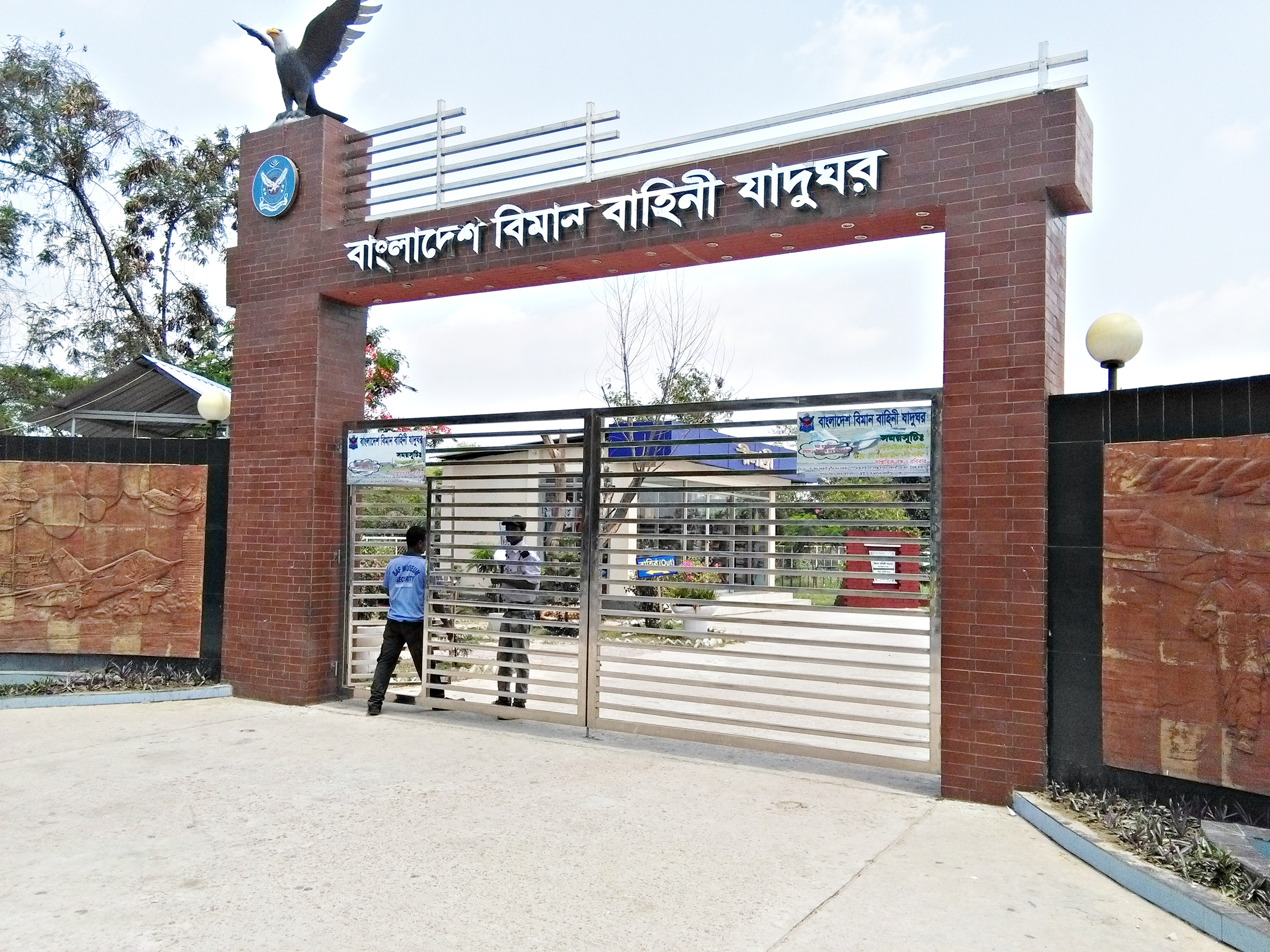
- Old entrance of the Air Force Museum
- Established: June 17, 1987
- Location: Begum Rokeya Avenue, Tejgaon, Dhaka, Bangladesh
- Coordinates: 23.77°N 90.37°E
- Type: Aviation museum
- Accreditation: Bangladesh Air Force
- Collections: Dakota Aircraft; Alouette Helicopter; F-86 Fighter Jet; Mukti Bahini’s Hunter Jet; ppMiG-21FL; Gnat Aircraft
- Owner: Bangladesh Air Force
- Public transit access: Begum Rokeya Avenue; 6 Agargaon
- Website: museum.baf.mil.bd

Bangladesh Air Force Museum is the first aviation museum in Bangladesh, located in Agargaon, Dhaka. This museum was established in 1987 with the aim of preserving the history, achievements, and progress of the Bangladesh Air Force and presenting them.

== Location ==
To the west of this museum is Begum Rokeya Sarani and Computer City (IDB Building), while to the east lies the vast runway of Tejgaon Airport and Bangladesh Air Force Base. A lake is located to the north, and to the south, there is a row of green trees and Banani.

== Background ==
The foundation of the Bangladesh Air Force Museum was initially laid on June 17, 1987. Later, in 2014, it was reconstructed in a more organized and well-structured manner on the western side of the Tejgaon Airport runway, adjacent to Begum Rokeya Sarani, and was opened to the public. The museum was inaugurated on September 28, 2014, by Air Marshal Enamul Bari.

== Notable collections ==
The museum is primarily decorated with helicopters and aircraft from different periods. Some of the notable exhibits include:

- Bolaka: first passenger aircraft of Bangladesh, Russian-made aircraft arrived in Bangladesh in 1958
- Air Tourer: Aircraft being used for training, manufactured in New Zealand and joined the Bangladesh Air Force in 1997
- PT-6: Chinese-made aircraft was added to Bangladesh Airlines in 1985
- Fouga CM-170: French-made aircraft, built in 1960, was inducted into the Bangladesh Air Force in 1997
- Glider: Aircraft was gifted by Germany for the Bangladesh Air Force's aviation experience and was brought to Bangladesh in 1982
- Airtech Canadian DH 3/1000: Canadian-made bomber aircraft successfully carried out operations at Chittagong Seaport during the 1971 Independence War
- Hunter Aircraft: During the Independence War, India used Hunter aircraft to support Bangladesh. The Indian Air Force later gifted this aircraft to Bangladesh Air Force
- Dakota Aircraft: bomber aircraft used during the Independence War. It was capable of carrying 5,000 pound bombs

Additionally, the museum houses aircraft such as FT-5, MiG-21, Gnat, F-6, and A5-III.

== Aquarium Park ==
Aquarium Park, inaugurated on 28 August 2026, is situated inside the Bangladesh Air Force Museum. The Park currently contains many water species including fresh-water fishes & sharks, non-indigenous birds like macaws & lovebirds, and a 40 feet (12 m) high artificial waterfall. Visitors can capture Images with macaws and feed the fishes. Currently, the inaugural entry fee is 150৳ for all people aged above two, which would become 200৳ after 27 September 2026, with 50% discount available for students in study tour.

== Museum schedule ==
The museum is open from Monday to Saturday, from 2:00 pm to 8:00 pm, and remains closed every Sunday except on special occasions. Visitors can enter the museum with a ticket priced at 50 BDT. Additionally, for 30 BDT, visitors can board the helicopters or aircraft inside the museum.

== Gallery ==
Mi-4 Hound aircraft of the Indian Air Force

Antonov An-24

Fouga CM-170 aircraft

MiG-21 aircraft

JB225 aircraft

DHT-3 aircraft, used in Operation Kilo Flight

Douglas C-47 aircraft

Aquarium Park

Aquarium Park

Sampan-shaped monument at Aquarium Park

Tunnel at Aquarium Park

Artificial waterfall at Aquarium Park

Macaw at Aquarium Park

Amusement rides

Air Force Base Camp
