= Northern route =

Northern route may refer to

- Great Northern route, a rail route in the UK
- North–South Expressway Northern Route, a highway in Malaysia
- Northern Dispersal, an hypothesis of early human migration
- Northern Sea Route, a shipping route in Russia
- Northern Route (MRT Line 5), a metro line in Dhaka, Bangladesh
