= Northern Route (MRT Line 5) =

Branch of the MRT Line 5 of Dhaka Metro

Mass Rapid Transit Line 5 Northern Route

Overview
- Status: Under construction
- Owner: Road Transport and Highways Division
- Locale: Greater Dhaka, Bangladesh
- Termini: Hemayetpur (West); Bhatara (East)
- Stations: 14
- Colour on map: Sky Blue (#00B5E2)

Service
- Type: Rapid transit
- System: Dhaka Metro Rail
- Operator: Dhaka Mass Transit Company Limited
- Depot(s): Hemayetpur, Savar Upazila

History
- Work began: 4 November 2023
- Completed: December 2032 (estimated)

Technical
- Line length: 20 kilometres (12 mi)
- Number of tracks: 2
- Character: Elevated and underground
- Track gauge: 1,435 mm (4 ft 8 1/2 in) standard gauge
Route map
- Source

The Northern Route (Bengali: নর্দার্ন রুট) is one of the branches of the approved MRT Line 5 of Dhaka Metro Rail; the other one being the Southern Route. Construction on the Northern Route's depot began on 4 November 2023, with operations scheduled to commence in December 2032.

== History ==
=== Development ===
In 2005, the World Bank published a study report, recommending that the government of Bangladesh build a mass transit system in Dhaka. In the same year, American consultancy firm Louis Berger Group prepared a strategic transport plan for Dhaka. The World Bank helped to develop this plan, which proposed the construction of five MRT lines in Dhaka. The five metro lines were MRT Line 1, MRT Line 2, MRT Line 4, MRT Line 5 and MRT Line 6. On 7 August 2018, the government sought expression of interest for the northern route project. On 15 December 2019, the project was approved by the Executive Committee of the National Economic Council (ECNEC). At that time, the potential construction cost of the Northern Route was estimated at ৳41238.54 crore (equivalent to ৳600 billion or US$4.9 billion in 2024). This has been considered as a fast track project by the government. In June 2020, Nippon Koei Company Limited was commissioned to design the route. However, as the proposed alignment of the route would pass over the Dhaka–Aricha highway, the Roads and Highways Department (RHD) objected to its construction and halted the pre-construction activities. A meeting was held between the two sides on 23 March 2021 to resolve the issue. In the meeting, the RHD proposed to the metro authority to change the alignment and shift it to the south. But it became impossible due to the acquired land for depot at Hemayetpur and technical reasons. On 28 June 2022, a loan agreement of 71% of the total budget was signed between Bangladesh and Japan International Cooperation Agency (JICA) to finance the project. On 3 October 2022, Dhaka Mass Transit Company Limited (DMTCL) got the ownership of the land acquired by the depot. On 17 April 2023, DMTCL stated that it intends to start its construction in July of the same year depending on the decision of the Board of Directors meeting scheduled the next day. On 23 May 2023, a contract worth ৳1,189 crore was signed by TOE Corporation and Spectra Engineers Limited with the metro authority for the construction of the depot. Another meeting was held that day between RHD and DMTCL where RHD once again requested to change the location of two stations of the line which were to be constructed in Savar Upazila. According to RHD, construction of the line on the median of the highway will cause traffic jams on the highway. Also, construction of the line on the highway may make it an accident-prone highway. However, the Additional Chief Engineer of RHD said that considering the importance of the metro project, the government will revise the alignment of the expressway. Besides, according to the project director of the Northern Route, there will be no problem if the width of the highway is increased on the other side while closing one side of the highway while constructing the line. In the same month, South Korea signed a framework arrangement to provide $1.5 billion in financing for the route. On 20 August 2023, Obaidul Quader, formar minister of Road Transport and Bridges, announced that the inauguration ceremony of the line's construction would happen on 16 September 2023. But later on 10 September 2023, the project official notified that it would not be possible on the fixed date of the tight schedule of formar Prime Minister Sheikh Hasina. The construction of the line was then inaugurated on 4 November 2023 by Hasina, the same day as the opening of MRT Line 6's second phase which completed Line 6's operation from Agargaon to Motijheel.

=== Future plans ===
A station on this route is proposed at Kochukhet which is an area under Dhaka Cantonment. Therefore, DMTCL needed to get no-objection letter from Bangladesh Army to construct the station at this place. While applying the no-objection letter, the army suggested revising the line to Nabinagar in the west and the army-developed Jolshiri Abashon in the east. Later on 8 December 2020, DMTCL informed the Army that in future the line would be extended to the areas suggested by them.

== Stations ==
The MRT Line 5's Northern Route has 14 proposed stations. 13.5 km of this route with 9 stations will be underground and 6.5 km with 5 stations will be elevated.

Code	Name		Connections	Location	Opened
Code	English	Bengali	Connections	Location	Opened
1	Hemayetpur	হেমায়েতপুর		Savar Upazila	Under Construction
2	Baliarpur	বালিয়ারপুর		Savar Upazila	Under Construction
3	Bilamalia	বিলামালিয়া		Savar Upazila	Under Construction
4	Amin Bazar	আমিনবাজার		Savar Upazila	Under Construction
5	Gabtoli	গাবতলী	MRT Line 2 MRT Line 5S	Mirpur Model Thana	Under Construction
6	Darus Salam	দারুস সালাম		Darus Salam Thana	Under Construction
7	Mirpur 1	মিরপুর ১		Mirpur Model Thana	Under Construction
8	Mirpur 10	মিরপুর ১০	MRT Line 6	Mirpur Model Thana	Under Construction
9	Mirpur 14	মিরপুর ১৪		Kafrul Thana	Under Construction
10	Kochukhet	কচুক্ষেত		Cantonment Thana	Under Construction
11	Banani	বনানী		Banani	Under Construction
12	Gulshan 2	গুলশান ২		Gulshan	Under Construction
13	Notun Bazar	নতুন বাজার	MRT Line 1	Baridhara	Under Construction
14	Vatara	ভাটারা		Vatara Thana	Under Construction
