= MRT Line 2 (Dhaka Metro Rail) =

Mass rapid transit line of Dhaka Metro

Mass Rapid Transit Line 2

Overview
- Status: Proposed
- Owner: Road Transport and Highways Division
- Locale: Greater Dhaka, Bangladesh
- Termini: Gabtoli (West); Demra (East)
- Colour on map: Violet (#8031A7)

Service
- Type: Rapid transit
- System: Dhaka Metro Rail
- Operator: Dhaka Mass Transit Company Limited
- Depot(s): Matuail, Demra Thana

Technical
- Line length: 23.50 kilometres (14.60 mi)
- Number of tracks: 2
- Character: Elevated and underground
- Track gauge: 1,435 mm (4 ft 8 1/2 in) standard gauge
- Electrification: 750 V DC third rail and 1,500 V DC overhead catenary
- Operating speed: 100 km/h (62 mph)
- Highest elevation: 13 metres (43 ft)
Route map

The MRT Line 2 (Bengali: এমআরটি লাইন ২) is a proposed rapid transit line of Dhaka Metro Rail in Bangladesh. Despite the number, it will be the fifth of the Dhaka Metro Rail system and will be operated by Dhaka Mass Transit Company Limited (DMTCL). It is scheduled to open in 2030.

== History ==
In 2005, the World Bank published a study report, recommending that the government of Bangladesh build a mass transit system in Dhaka. In the same year, American consultancy firm Louis Berger Group prepared a strategic transport plan for Dhaka. The World Bank helped to develop this plan, which proposed the construction of five MRT lines in Dhaka. The five metro lines were MRT Line 1, MRT Line 2, MRT Line 4, MRT Line 5 and MRT Line 6. On 15 June 2017, an agreement was signed between the government of Bangladesh and Japan to build MRT Line 2 on a Public Private Partnership (PPP) basis. On June 7 of the following year, a sub-working group headed by Marubeni was formed to list its construction project in the PPP. It was planned to connect Gabtoli with Kamalapur through MRT Line 2. On 1 October 2019, Selina Hayat Ivy, the mayor of Narayanganj City Corporation, submitted a written request to Obaidul Quader, the Road Transport and Bridges minister, to connect Narayanganj with the Dhaka Metro network. As a result, in the meeting of the Dhaka Transport Coordination Authority on 24 November 2019, it was decided to revise and extend the route of MRT Line 2 to Chittagong Road area of Narayanganj Sadar Upazila. The pre-feasibility report showed that three lakh passengers could travel through this line. 24 stations were proposed on the route and the proposed length of the line was 24 km (15 mi). But the Dhaka Mass Transit Company Limited (DMTCL) disagreed as the PPP study by the consultancy firm recommended that Japan should take the responsibility for operation and maintenance of MRT Line 2. Based on a preliminary study prepared by Oriental Consultants Global and PwC for the fiscal year 2020-21, the project was declared ineligible for implementation in a March 2021 report. However, in 2015 the finalized Strategic Transport Plan (STP) made the project feasible. According to the study, if construction is done in PPP, the government would have to bear 85% of the budget, so the government excludes it from PPP and looks for donor agencies for construction. On the other hand, with another railway project underway on the proposed route of MRT Line 2, DMTCL planned to change the route to connect the southern city of Narayanganj with the metro network. The proposed mass rapid transit line was budgeted at about ৳60,000 crore.

In 2023, the government decided to request the Department of Economic Relations (ERD) to find donors to fund MRT Line 2. ERD found World Bank, Japan and South Korea as potential donors. On 3 July 2024, Export–Import Bank of China in a meeting with ERD expressed interest in lending 75% of the total budget of MRT Line 2. On the same day, local government and rural development and co-operatives minister Md Tazul Islam was assured of financial support for the project by Hara Shohei, vice president of the Japan International Cooperation Agency.

After the Yunus interim government was formed in August 2024, the Bangladesh Planning Commission, under the direction of Planning Advisor Wahiduddin Mahmud, proposed to prioritize the implementation of the proposed line considering the economic importance and population density of the route and a branch line to Bijoy Sarani with revised route of Southern Route including only Hatirjheel–Dasherkandi section.

In August 2025, it had been reported that the route was revised and instead end at Demra, deviating from plans to connect MRT Line 2 to Narayanganj, with new stations at areas like Lalbagh and Mitford of Old Dhaka. The project is expeted to be funded by the World Bank. Narayanganj would be integrated to the system with a new line called MRT Line 7.

== Stations ==
List of stations and their names are subject to change.

=== Main line ===
| Code | Name | | Connections | Location | Opened |
| Code | English | Bengali | Connections | Location | Opened |
|---|---|---|---|---|---|
| 1 | Gabtoli | গাবতলী | MRT Line 5N; MRT Line 5S | Mirpur Model Thana | Planned |
| 2 | Dhaka Uddan | ঢাকা উদ্যান | | Mohammadpur Thana | Planned |
| 3 | Bosila | বসিলা | | Mohammadpur Thana | Planned |
| 4 | Mohammadpur | মোহাম্মদপুর | | Mohammadpur Thana | Planned |
| 5 | Jhigatola | ঝিগাতলা | | Hazaribagh Thana | Planned |
| 6 | Science Lab | সায়েন্স ল্যাব | | Dhanmondi Thana | Planned |
| 7 | New Market | নিউ মার্কেট | | New Market Thana | Planned |
| 8 | Azimpur | আজিমপুর | | Azimpur | Planned |
| 9 | Chawkbazar | চকবাজার | | Chawkbazar | Planned |
| 10 | Lalbagh | লালবাগ | | Lalbagh | Planned |
| 11 | Mitford | মিটফোর্ড | | Kotwali | Planned |
| 12 | Nayabazar | নয়াবাজার | | Bangshal Thana | Planned |
| 13 | Dholaikhal | দোলাইখাল | | Dholaikhal | Planned |
| 14 | Dayaganj | দয়াগঞ্জ | | Ganderia | Planned |
| 15 | Kaptan Bazar | কাপ্তান বাজার | | Kaptan Bazar | Planned |
| 16 | Demra | ডেমরা | | Demra Thana | Planned |
| 17 | Tarabo | তারাবো | | Tarabo | Planned |

=== Branch line ===
| Code | Name | | Connections | Location | Opened |
| Code | English | Bengali | Connections | Location | Opened |
|---|---|---|---|---|---|
| 1 | Gulistan | গুলিস্তান | | Gulistan | Planned |
| 2 | Golap Shah Mazar | গোলাপ শাহ মাজার | | Gulistan | Planned |
| 3 | Nayabazar | নয়াবাজার | | Bangshal Thana | Planned |
| 4 | Sadarghat | সদরঘাট | | Sadarghat, Port of Dhaka | Planned |

=== Depot ===
A land area totaling 65 hectares (0.65 km^{2}) has been designated between Green Model Town and Amulia Model Town, encompassing the Matuail and Damripara mouzas in Demra. This allocation is intended for the construction of the depot, depot access corridors, and construction yards.
