= Dhaka Circular Railway =

Proposed orbital suburban rail for Dhaka Metropolitan Area

Overview
- Native name: Bengali: ঢাকা চক্ররেল
- Owner: Bangladesh Railway
- Area served: Dhaka and Greater Dhaka
- Transit type: Commuter rail
- Number of stations: 24

Operation
- Operation will start: 2030
- Operator: Bangladesh Railway

Technical
- System length: 80.89 km (50.26 mi)

The Dhaka Circular Railway (Bengali: ঢাকা চক্ররেল, romanized: Dhaka Chokrorel) is a proposed orbital suburban rail system in Bangladesh which is expected to serve Dhaka and Greater Dhaka once completed, and marginally reduce traffic in the city. The project is being considered for investment by South Korea and implemented by Bangladesh Railway.

== Background ==
A survey conducted by a Chinese firm has determined the feasibility of an approximately 81-kilometer rail route in Greater Dhaka for a circular railway. The project draft outlines plans for 24 stations along the route, with Tongi station serving as the central hub. Notably, 11 of these stations are designated as 'transfer stations,' linking to other modes of transport such as MRT, BRT, and the subway. Bangladesh Railway, under a public-private partnership, is currently executing the 80.89-kilometer circular rail line project from Tongi station through Demra, Chasara, Babubazar, Gabtoli, Birulia, and Dhour, back to Tongi, following a feasibility study.

The estimated cost for this project is US$8.4 billion.

== Criticisms and concerns ==
Concerns have been raised about the project's utility, given government plans to develop metro lines and a circular road in the same corridor earmarked for the circular railway. Because of the densely populated nature of Dhaka, attempting to construct circular, subway and metro rail simultaneously is deemed nearly impossible. Critics have highlighted the challenges of investing vast resources and suggested that feasibility studies conducted by the railway and bridges division for subway and circular rail projects may ultimately result in wastage of resources.
