= Dhaka Metro Rail =

Mass rapid transit system in Bangladesh

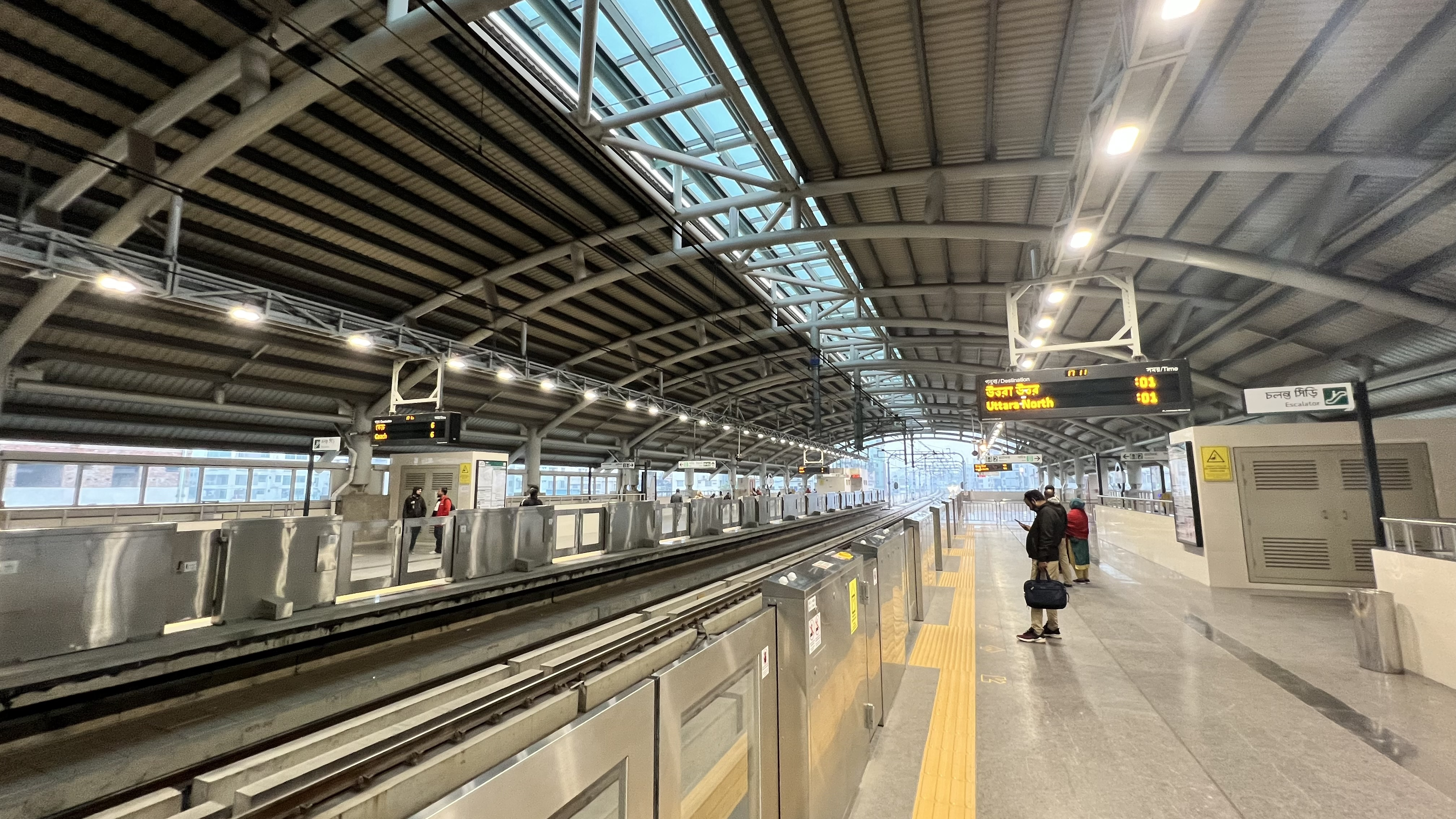
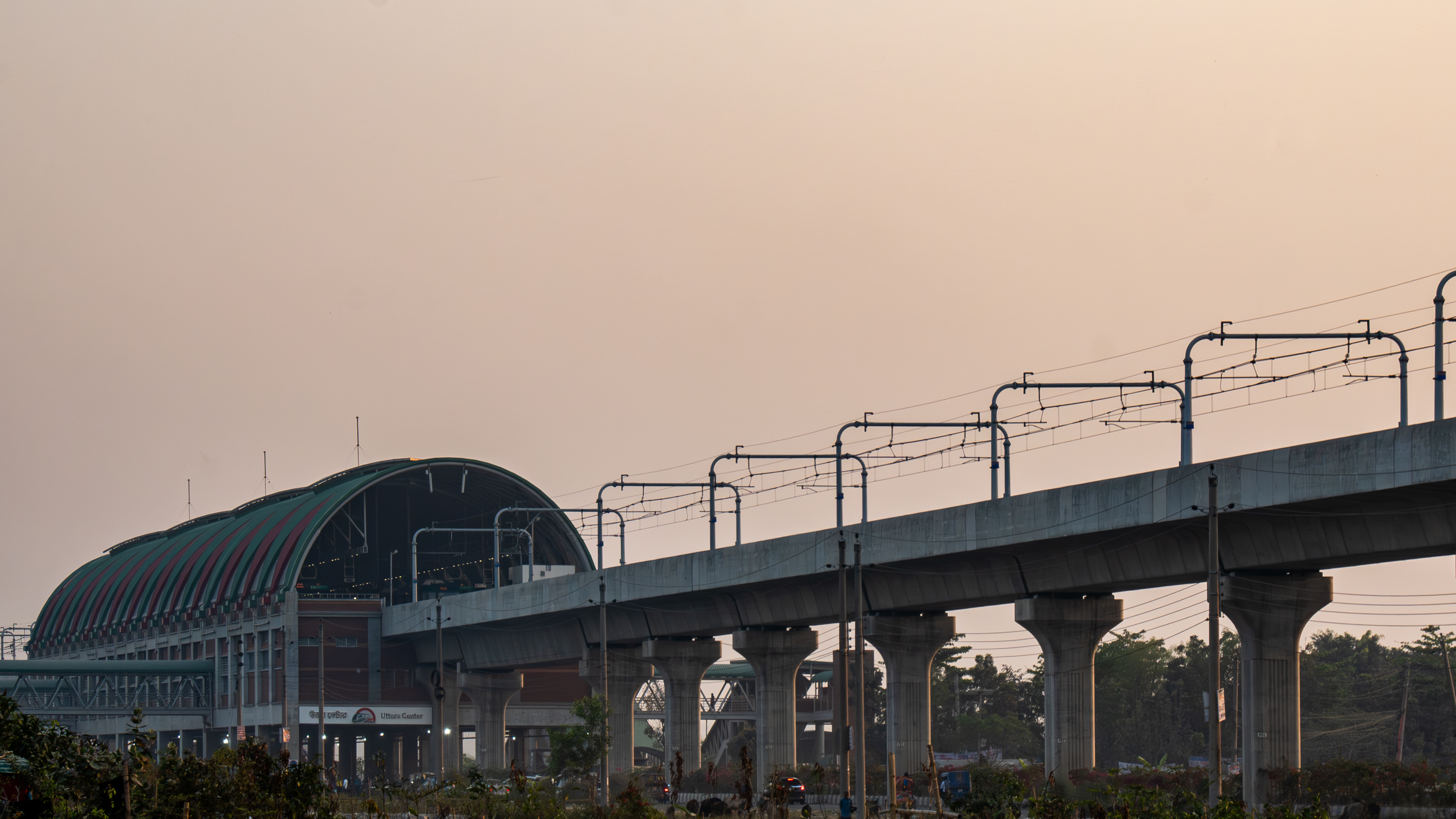
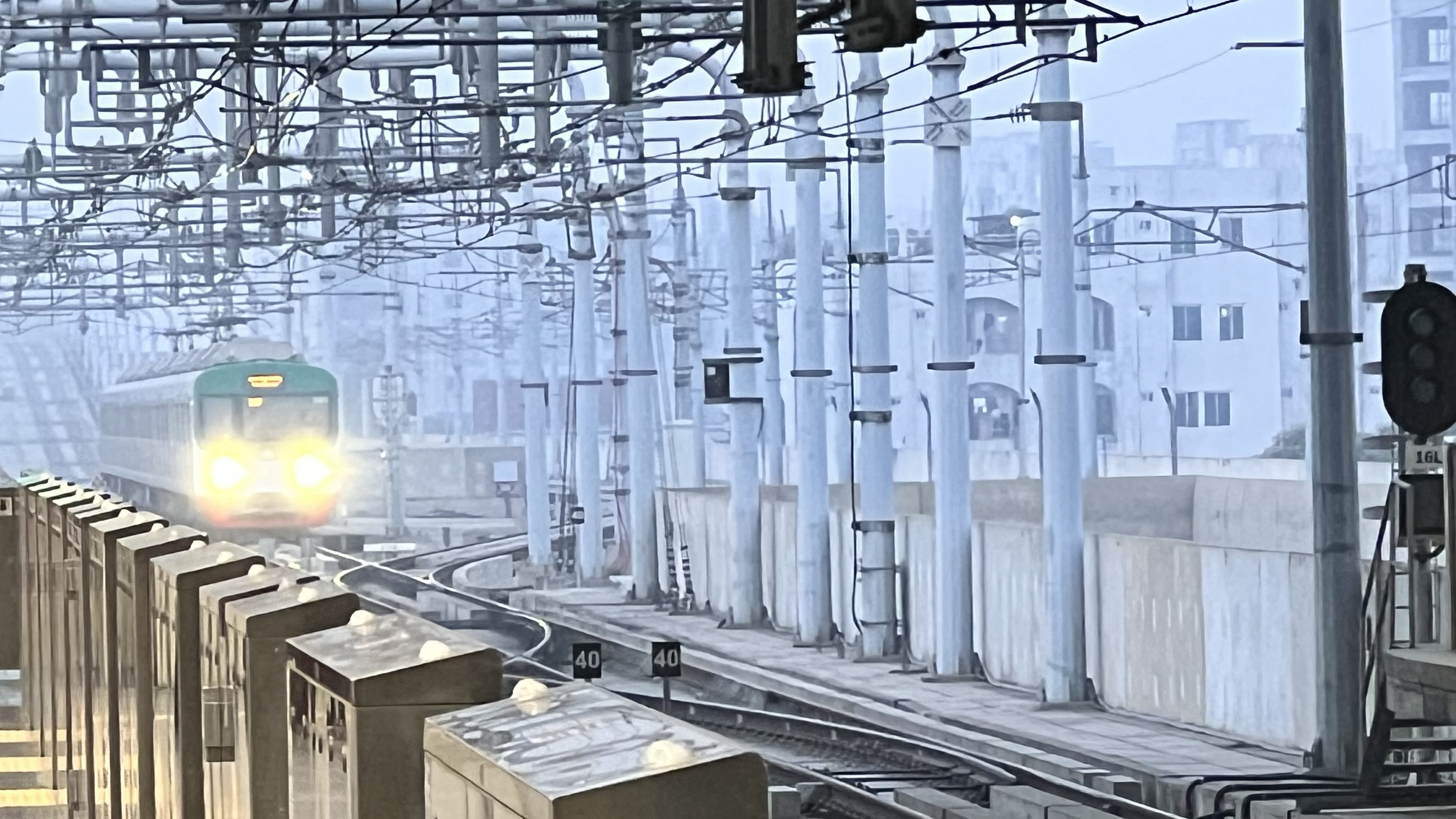
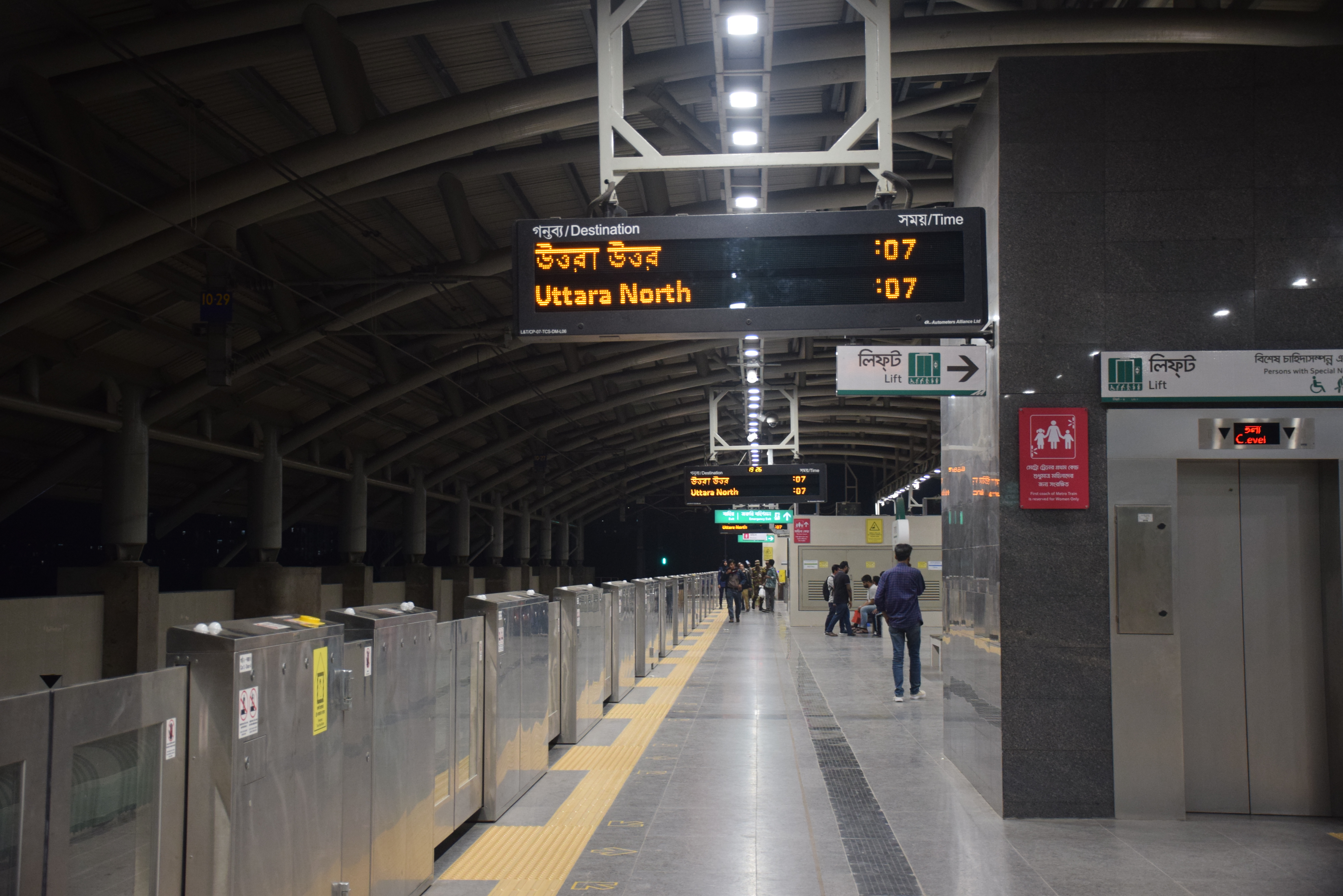
- Platform, Uttara North Station and track, Uttara Center Train entering Uttara Center station Platform, Agargaon

Overview
- Native name: ঢাকা মেট্রোরেল
- Owner: Road Transport and Highways Division
- Locale: Greater Dhaka, Bangladesh
- Transit type: Mass Rapid Transit
- Number of lines: 1 operational; 2 under construction; 3 planned
- Line number: Operational: MRT Line 6; Under construction: MRT Line 1; MRT Line 5N; MRT Line 6; (Kamalapur extension) Approved: MRT Line 5S; Planned: MRT Line 2; MRT Line 4
- Number of stations: 16 (operational), 103 (planned); See Network
- Daily ridership: est. 350,000
- Key people: Md. Nazrul Islam (Chairman); Faruque Ahmed (Managing Director)
- Headquarters: Probashi Kallyan Bhaban (Level-14), 71,72, Old Elephant Road, Eskaton Gardens, Ramna, Dhaka-1000
- Website: dmtcl.gov.bd

Operation
- Began operation: 29 December 2022; 3 years ago
- Operator: Dhaka Mass Transit Company Limited
- Number of vehicles: MRT 6: 12 pairs of trains (total 24 trains)
- Train length: 6 coaches

Technical
- System length: 20.1 km (12.5 mi)
- Track gauge: 1,435 mm (4 ft 8 1/2 in) (standard gauge)
- Electrification: 1500V DC via Overhead (Elevated): 750V DC via Third Rail; (Underground)
- Average speed: 30 km/h (19 mph)
- Top speed: 100 km/h (62 mph)
MRT network plan

The Dhaka Metro Rail (Bengali: ঢাকা মেট্রোরেল) is a mass rapid transit system serving Dhaka, the capital and largest city of Bangladesh. It is operated by the Dhaka Mass Transit Company Limited (DMTCL). The metro rail project is expected to reduce traffic congestion in the city. The metro rail network's only operational line is the MRT Line 6; currently under construction are MRT Line 1 and MRT Line 5, and MRT Line 2 and MRT Line 4 are in the planning stages. It is part of the Strategic Transport Plan outlined by the Dhaka Transport Coordination Authority (DTCA). It has been reported that other Dhaka metro rail projects apart from MRT-6 will be completed in the early 2030s.

The first section of MRT Line 6 commenced commercial operations on 29 December 2022 and the second section on 5 November 2023. The third phase, which will have an interchange with Line 1, Line 2 and Line 4, is set to be completed by 2026. Further expansion of MRT Line 6 is expected towards Savar Upazila and Tongi. Passengers get a 10% discount on the fare when using the MRT Pass or Rapid Pass. MRT line 6 currently operates daily from 7:30 am to 9:00 pm and on Fridays from 3:30 pm to 9:00 pm (7:10 am to 9:40 pm for MRT Pass/Rapid Pass holders). MRT Police provides security for the Dhaka Metro Rail.

== History ==
To implement Dhaka's 20-year-long Strategic Transport Plan, the government of Bangladesh invited the Japan International Cooperation Agency to conduct a primary survey and feasibility study on the transport system of Dhaka in 2009–2010. In 2012, the executive committee of the National Economic Council approved the project. A loan agreement between the Bangladeshi government and the Japanese International Cooperation Agency was signed in January 2013.

Dhaka Mass Transit Company Limited, the agency responsible for the implementation of the first metro line, was formed in January 2013. The General Consultant, namely the NKDM Association, commenced work beginning in February 2014. In June 2013, Dhaka Mass Transit Company Limited was established by the government to implement the Metro Rail Lines across the city. Dhaka metro rail was opened by Prime Minister Sheikh Hasina on 29 December 2022.

=== History of MRT Line-6 ===
==== Construction ====
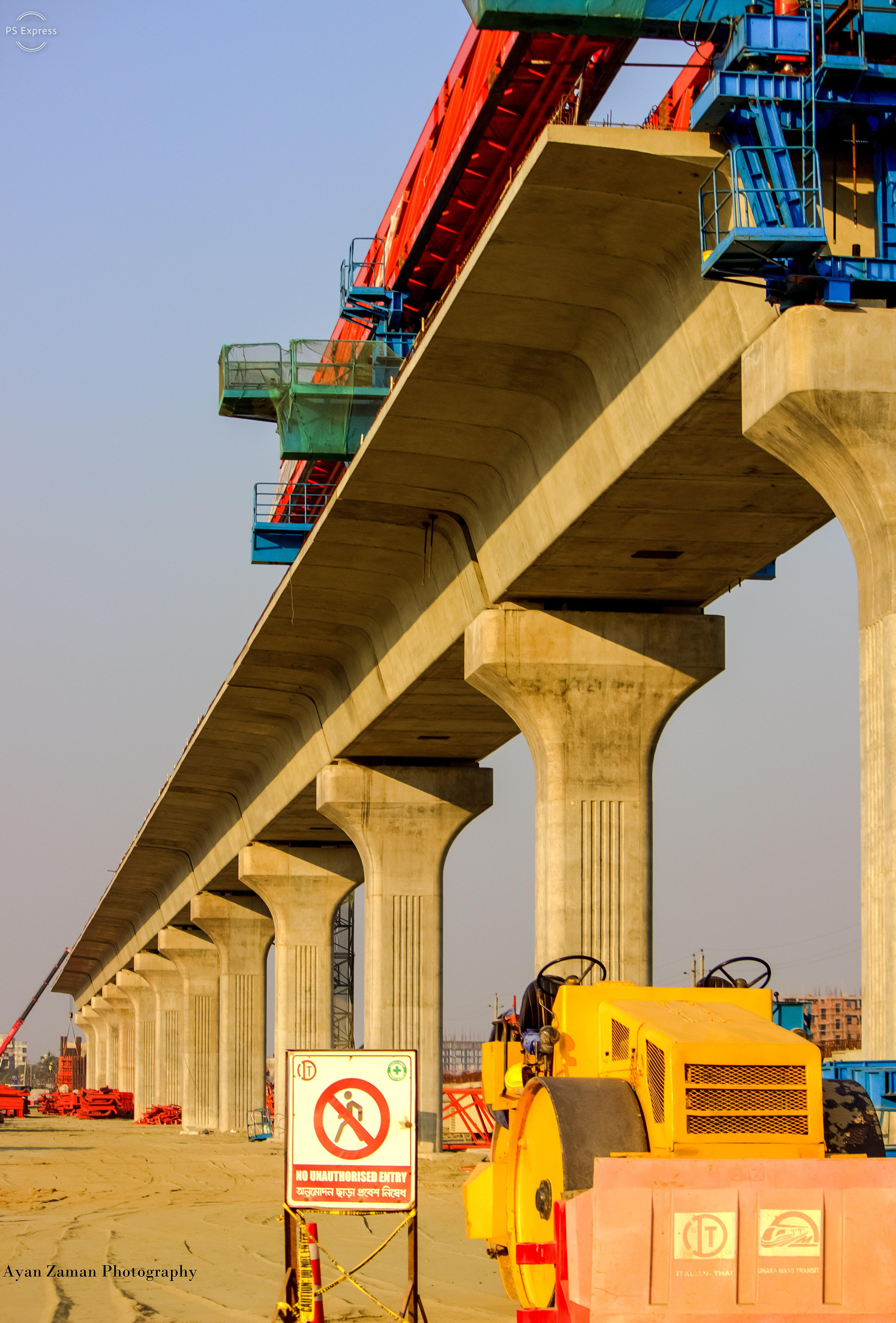
Line-6 under construction in 2020

The deal for the construction of the MRT Line-6, costing US$2.8 billion, was signed by the government of Bangladesh with the Japan International Cooperation Agency on 20 February 2013. Construction began on 26 June 2016 with an inauguration ceremony presided over by Prime Minister Sheikh Hasina. Civil engineering work was done by the Italian-Thai Development Public Company Ltd. and China's Sinohydro Corporation Ltd. JV, and a Tokyo-based construction company developed the depot's land.

Construction work was divided into eight packages, covering aspects like depots, stations and rolling stock.

==== Planning ====
When construction commenced in 2016, the Metro Rail was expected to open by the end of 2019. By 2018, this expectation was still held to, but by 2019, completion of phase one was delayed to December 2021. In 2018, the second phase was expected to be complete by December 2020. Eventually, these dates were pushed back, with phase one opening in 2022 and phase two expected in 2023. The main reason for the delays from 2020 to 2022 was the COVID-19 pandemic.

==== Cost and length changes ====
Originally, the project cost was Tk 219,850 million but it was later increased by Tk 114,870 million to Tk 334,720 million, although the full Project is not yet completed. The first route, originally projected to start from Uttara, a northern area of Dhaka, to Sayedabad, in the south of the capital, was eventually extended north to Uttara and truncated south to Motijheel. The original length which was 20.10 km (12.49 mi) has been increased by 1.16 km (0.72 mi) to 21.26 km (13.21 mi). It was planned to have 16 stations originally but it has been increased to 17 stations.

==== Misconceptions ====
The project was originally reported to be a 27 km (17 mi) underground metro rail line. It was later confirmed to be an elevated and underground metro rail project. In 2014, it was reported that 56 trains would run on the metro system. It was confirmed that 24 vehicles would run on the MRT Line 6. It was planned to have six lines.

==== Trial runs ====
MRT Line-6's train made its first run on 29 August 2021. It traveled from Diabari Depot to Mirpur 12. It successfully made its second run on 29 November 2021. It traveled from Uttara to Mirpur 10. The line's train made its longest trial run on 12 December 2021. It traveled from Uttara to Agargaon. The train ran for after invigoration has been run 4 stations along with mirpur to Agargaon station after several months other stations are open11.3 km (7.0 mi). It ran at 100 km/h (62 mph) for 9 km (5.6 mi) and ran at 15–20 km (9.3–12.4 mi) for the rest.

== Architecture ==
Line 6 consists of 16 operational elevated stations of 180 m (590 ft 7 in) length each, and 20.1 km (12.5 mi) of electricity-powered light rail tracks. All of line 6, save for the depot and some of its accompanying LRT, will be elevated above current roads. Mostly, this will be above road medians to allow traffic flow underneath, with stations also elevated. The Dhaka Metro is projected to serve more than 60,000 passengers per hour by 2022 with headways of approximately 4 minutes. The entire route can be travelled in less than 40 minutes at a speed of 100 km/h (62 mph), and is expected to drastically reduce the number of private cars on Dhaka's streets as well as their potentially 7-hour-long standstills. The system is using magnetic contactless Integrated Circuit Ticketing, commonly known as smart cards. Platform screen door (PSD) barriers used at the platform level will increase safety and increase efficiency. Trains of six spacious air-conditioned cars will arrive every four minutes going each way at each of the 16 stations.

The project is being managed by the Communications Ministry's Dhaka Transport Co-ordination Authority, and a consortium of foreign and Bangladeshi firms known as the NKDM Association is acting as the project's general consultant. The NKDM Association consists of Nippon Koei Japan and Development Design Consultants (local consultant - Bangladesh).

== Infrastructure ==
=== Rolling stock ===
Japan-based Kawasaki Heavy Industries (with Mitsubishi Heavy Industries) made the rolling stock for DMTCL.

Feature	Description
Nickname	The "Green Train"
Dimensions	19.8m long, 2.95m wide, and 4.1m high
Max speed	~100 km/h
Number of cars	24 trainsets, each with 6 cars, total 144 cars
Carrying Capacity	~60,000 per hour
Power Delivery	1500 V DC via overhead catenary power line
Body Material	Stainless Steel
Quality of life and safety features	Air conditioned, CCTV surveillance etc.

== Network ==
Planned network map of Dhaka Metro Rail

=== Operational ===
Operational
Line	First run	Stations	Number of Stations	Length (km)	Terminals		Interchange Stations	Depot
MRT Line 6 First Phase	29 December 2022	Uttara North, Uttara Center, Uttara South, Pallabi, Mirpur-11, Mirpur-10, Kazipara, Shewrapara, Agargaon	9	11.73	Uttara Terminal	Agargaon	MRT Line 5N at Mirpur 10	Diabari Depot
MRT Line 6 Second Phase	4 November 2023	Bijoy Sarani, Farmgate, Kawran Bazar, Shahbagh, Dhaka University, Bangladesh Secretariat, Motijheel	7	9.53	Uttara Terminal	Motijheel	MRT Line 5S at Kawran Bazar MRT Line 2 at Motijheel	Diabari Depot

=== Under construction / Planned ===
Under construction/ Planned
Line	Expected completion	Stations	Number of Stations	Length (km)	Terminals		Interchange Stations	Depot
MRT Line 1 (Airport Route)	2033	Hazrat Shahjalal International Airport, Hazrat Shahjalal International Airport Terminal 3, Khilkhet, Nadda, Notun Bazar, North Badda, Badda, Aftabnagar, Rampura, Malibagh, Rajarbagh, Kamalapur	21 (Note: The airport route will have 12 underground stations and the Purbachal route will have 9 elevated stations. The airport route will be 19.9 km (12.4 mi) and the Purbachal route will be 11.7 km (7.3 mi).)	31.233	Shahjalal International Airport	Kamalapur	MRT Line 5N at Notun Bazar MRT Line 5S at Aftabnagar MRT Line 2 MRT Line 4 MRT Line 6 at Kamalapur	Pitalganj Depot
MRT Line 1 (Purbachal Route)	2033	Notun Bazar, Nadda, Joar Sahara, Boalia, Mastul, PCS, Purbachal Centre, Purbachal East, Purbachal Terminal	21	31.233	Purbachal Terminal	Kamalapur	MRT Line 1 at Notun Bazar	Pitalganj Depot
MRT Line 2 (Main Line)	TBA	Gabtoli, Dhaka Uddan, Mohammadpur, Zigatola, Science Laboratory, New Market, Azimpur, Palashi, Dhaka Medical College, Gulistan, Motijheel, Kamalapur, Manda, Dakshingaon, Dhamripara, Signboard, Bhuigor, Jalkury, Downtown Narayanganj	22	35	Gabtoli	Narayanganj	MRT Line 5N MRT Line 5S at Gabtoli MRT Line 6 at Motijheel MRT Line 1 MRT Line 4 MRT Line 6 at Kamalapur MRT Line 4 at Signboard	Matuail Rail Depot
MRT Line 2 (Branch Line)	TBA	Gulistan, Golap Shah Mazar, Nayabazar, Sadarghat	22	35	Gabtoli	Narayanganj	N/A	Matuail Rail Depot
MRT Line 4	TBA	Kamalapur, Sayedabad, Jatrabari, Shonir Akhra, Signboard, Chittagong Road, Kanchpur, Madanpur	8	16	Kamalapur	Madanpur	MRT Line 1 MRT Line 2 MRT Line 6 at Kamalapur MRT Line 2 at Signboard	Madanpur
MRT Line 5 (Northern Route)	2033	Hemayetpur, Baliarpur, Bilamalia, Amin Bazar, Gabtoli, Darus-Salam, Mirpur 1, Mirpur 10, Mirpur 14, Kachukhet, Banani, Gulshan-2, Notun Bazar, Vatara	14	20	Hemayetpur	Vatara	MRT Line 2 MRT Line 5S at Gabtoli MRT Line 6 at Mirpur 10 MRT Line 1 at Notun Bazar	Hemayetpur Depot
MRT Line 5 (Southern Route)	2033	Gabtoli, Technical Circle, Kallyanpur, Shyamoli, College Gate, Asad Gate, Rasel Square, Karwan Bazar, Hatirjheel, Tejgaon, Aftabnagar, Aftabnagar Centre, Aftabnagar East, Nasirabad, Dasherkandi	15	17.3	Gabtoli	Dasherkandi	MRT Line 2 MRT Line 5N at Gabtoli MRT Line 6 at Kawran Bazar MRT Line 1 at Aftabnagar	Dasherkandi Depot
MRT Line 6 Third Phase	2027	Kamalapur	1	1.17	Uttara Terminal	Kamalapur	MRT Line 1 MRT Line 2 MRT Line 4 at Kamalapur	Diabari Depot
Total			104 (Note: if interchanges are counted multiple times.)	128.7 (Note: The network is planned to contain six lines (Counting MRT Line-1 as one line) with a total mileage of 128.741 kilometres (79.996 mi). MRT Line-6 is already under construction. Other lines are being planned.)				

=== Official time table for Dhaka metro rail ===
Time Table
FULL TIMETABLE
Sun	Mon	Tue	Wed	Thu	Fri	Sat
7:10AM to 11:00AM (peak hour) - every 6min; 11:01 AM to 04:00PM (off peak) - every 7min; 04:01PM to 09:40PM (peak hour) - every 6min	7:10AM to 11:00AM (peak hour) - every 6min; 11:01 AM to 04:00PM (off peak) - every 7min; 04:01PM to 09:40PM (peak hour) - every 6min	7:10AM to 11:00AM (peak hour) - every 6min; 11:01 AM to 04:00PM (off peak) - every 7min; 04:01PM to 09:40PM (peak hour) - every 6min	7:10AM to 11:00AM (peak hour) - every 6min; 11:01 AM to 04:00PM (off peak) - every 7min; 04:01PM to 09:40PM (peak hour) - every 6min	7:10AM to 11:00AM (peak hour) - every 6min; 11:01 AM to 04:00PM (off peak) - every 7min; 04:01PM to 09:40PM (peak hour) - every 6min	3:00PM to 09:40PM - every 6min	7:10AM to 11:00AM - every 6min; 11:01 AM to 09:40PM - every 6min

ㅤ

== MRT lines ==
=== MRT Line 1 ===
==== Airport Route ====
The construction of the 19.872 km (12.348 mi) long underground line, MRT Line 1 (Airport Route), is set to begin in December 2022, costing US$6.1 billion after many delays. Its deadline is set for 2026. It will start from Shahjalal International Airport and stop at Kamalapur Railway Station. The line will have 12 underground stations. Stations will be constructed at Shahjalal International Airport, Shahjalal International Airport Terminal 3, Khilkhet, Nadda, Notun Bazar, North Badda, Badda, Aftabnagar, Rampura, Malibagh, Rajarbagh and Kamalapur Railway Station. MRT Line 1 will have an interchange with MRT Line 6, MRT Line 2 and MRT Line 4 at Kamalapur Railway Station. There will be an interchange for the MRT Line 5 Northern Route and the MRT Line 1's Purbachal route at the Notun Bazar. Hatirjheel East of MRT Line 1 and Aftab Nagar West Station of MRT Line 5: Southern Route will have an Interchange. Above all, the airport will have an interchange of MRT Line-1 with BRT Line 3. The government will provide US$1.5 billion while the Japan International Cooperation Agency (JICA) will fund US$4.6 billion. The use of soundless TBMs will make it possible to build MRT Lind1's underground infrastructure without disrupting the daily lives of residents and businesses.

==== Purbachal Route ====
MRT Line 1 (Purbachal Route) will be 11.369 km (7.064 mi) long and it will have stations at Notun Bazar, Nadda, Bashundhara, Joar Sahara, Mostul, Purbachal Cricket Stadium, Purbachal Centre, Purbachal East and Purbachal Terminal. Of these stations, Notun Bazar and Nadda would be underground as a part of the airport route.

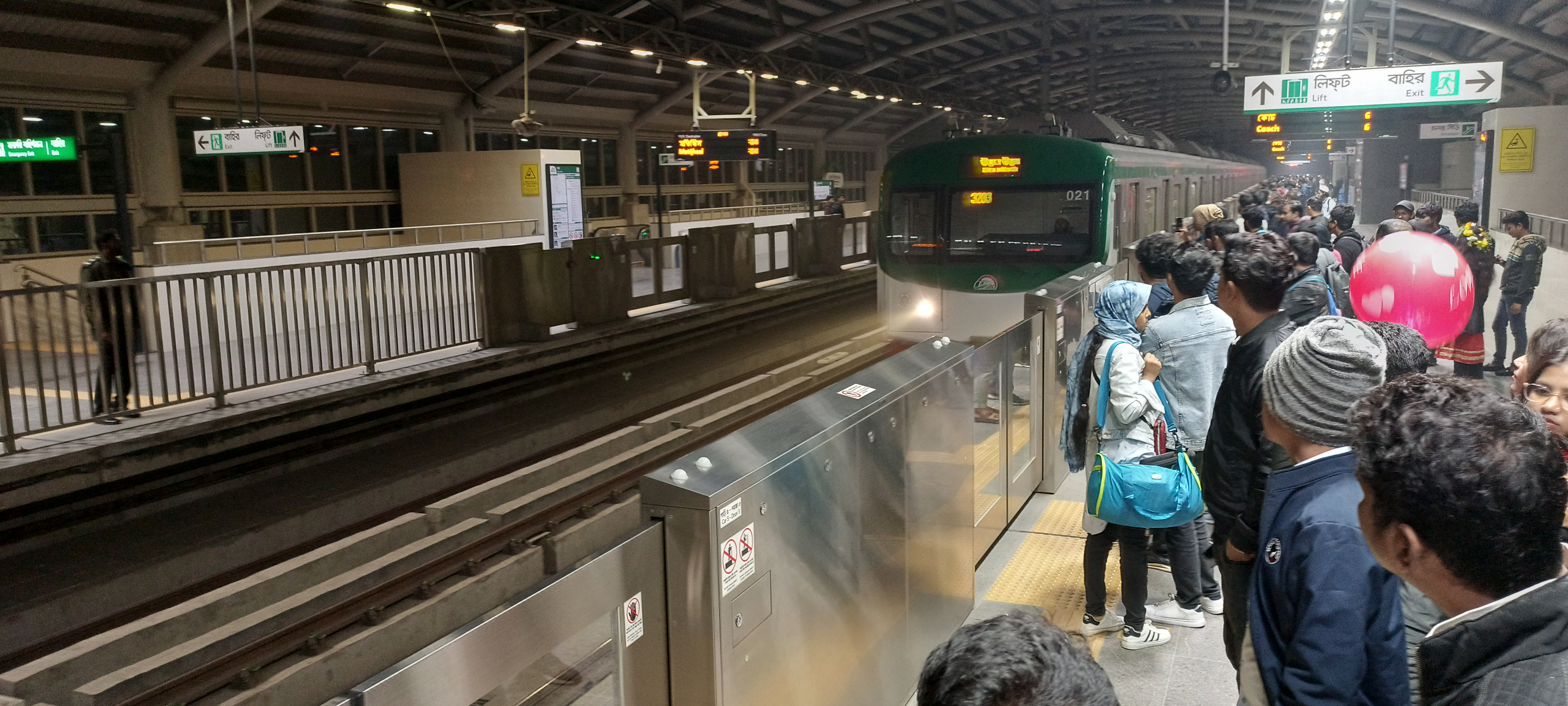
A metro station platform at night

=== MRT Line 2 ===
MRT Line 2 will connect Gabtali with Chittagong Road. The stations on this route are Gabtoli, Dhaka Uddan, Mohammadpur, Jhigatola, Science Laboratory, New Market, Azimpur, Palashi, DHK Medical College, Gulistan, Motijheel, Kamalapur, Manda, Dakkhingaon, Damripara, Signboard, Vuighar, Jalkuri and Downtown Narayanganj in the Main Line and Gulistan, Golap Shah Mazar, Nayabazar and Sadarghat in the Branch Line. The length of this line will be 22 km (14 mi).

=== MRT Line 4 ===
MRT Line 4 will connect Kamalapur Railway Station with Narayanganj with elevated and underground lines (planned). Length of this line will be 8 km (5.0 mi). According to a survey conducted by Japan International Cooperation Agency (JICA), MRT Line-4 will run parallel to an existing line which will be converted to a dual gauge railway line by the order of the Bangladesh Railway Authority. The stations in this line are Kamalapur, Sayedabad, Jatrabari, Shonir Akhra, Signboard, CTG Road, Kanchpur and Madanpur.

=== MRT Line 5 ===
==== Northern Route ====
Construction of MRT Line 5 (Northern Route) will begin in September 2023. MRT Line-5 (Northern Route) will start from Hemayetpur of Savar Upazila and end at Vatara (at Bashundhara), costing US$4.85 billion. It expected to be 20 km (12 mi) long in total. Northern route will be 13.5 km (8.4 mi) underground and 6.5 km (4.0 mi) elevated. It will have 14 stations, of which 9 stations will be underground. Those underground stations will be constructed at Gabtoli, Darus Salam, Mirpur 1, Mirpur 10, Mirpur 14, Kachukhet, Banani, Gulshan 2 and Notun Bazar. 5 stations will be elevated. 5 elevated stations will be constructed at Hemayetpur, Baliarpur, Bilamalia, Amin Bazar and Vatara (at Bashundhara R/A). MRT Line 5 (Northern Route) will have depot at Hemayetpur of Savar Upazila.

==== Southern Route ====
The MRT Line 5 (Southern Route), which is about 17.4 km (10.8 mi) long, is expected to be operational between 2027 and 2030. It will connect Gabtoli with Dasherkandi. The stations on this route are Gabtoli, Technical, Kallyanpur, Shyamoli, College Gate, Asad Gate, Russel Square, Karwan Bazar, Hatirjheel, Tejgaon, Aftabnagar, Aftabnagar Centre, Aftabnagar East, Nasirabad and lastly Dasherkandi. It is possible to interchange with MRT line 5 (Northern Route) and MRT line 2 at Gabtoli, and with MRT Line 6 at Karwan Bazar.

=== MRT Line 6 ===
View of Sector 15 from train window while traveling from Uttara North to Uttara Center metro station

MRT Line 6 has 17 elevated stations each 180 meters long and 21.26 km (13.21 mi) of electric light rail track. All Line-6 and some attending light rail track, except the depot, have been elevated above the existing roads to allow traffic flow below.

This line consists of five phases, of which only the first and second are currently operational.

- Opened on 29 December 2022, from Uttara North to Agargaon with a length of 11.73 kilometres (7.29 mi).
- Opened on 5 November 2023, from Agargaon to Motijheel, which has a length of 8.37 kilometres (5.20 mi).
- Slated for completion on 1 January 2027, from Motijheel to Kamalapur, which will be 1.16 kilometres long (0.72 mi)
- With construction expected to start after Phase 3, from Uttara North to Tongi, with a length of 4.61 kilometres (2.86 mi)
- Further extension in the north-west through Ashulia and Baipayl to Nabinagar is planned.

== Fare issues ==
DMTCL constituted a Fare Fixing Committee to fix the fare of the MRT Line 6, in a meeting held on 10 January 2021, the committee fixed ৳2.40 per kilometer as the proposed fare. The proposed rent was determined based on the break-even point. According to the proposal, the fare from Uttara North to Motijheel was supposed to be ৳48.25. On 6 September 2022, Obaidul Quader announced a fare of ৳5 per kilometer and a minimum fare of ৳20. This finalized minimum fare is higher than Kolkata and Delhi Metro in India and Lahore Metro in Pakistan.

On 17 December 2022, the Secretary General of Bangladesh Passenger Welfare Association demanded to reduce the fare per kilometer and the minimum fare by half considering the interests of the passengers. On the other hand, on 26 December 2022, the Institute for Planning and Development demanded a 30% reduction in fares to encourage passengers to use the line. In a press conference held the next day, the managing director of DMTCL mentioned electricity price and profit as the reason for fixing higher fare rate.

In a meeting of the Standing Committee of Bangladesh Nationalist Party (BNP) held on the same day, Nazrul Islam Khan claimed that the fixed fare conflicted with the Metrorail Act, 2015. In the meeting, he criticized the government's decision stating that metro fares are higher than bus fares in the country. On 29 December 2022, Obaidul Quader stated that fares are not an issue here and that Dhaka's fixed fares are low when compared to mass rapid transit systems in Thailand and Malaysia. On 24 August 2023, Muhammad Abdul Mannan, the planning minister, said that the government is making efforts to reduce the ticket fares so that it is possible for common people to travel by mass rapid transit.

== See also ==
- MRT Pass
- Rapid Pass
- List of megaprojects in Bangladesh
- Dhaka Subway
- Dhaka Circular Railway
- Dhaka Bus Rapid Transit (Dhaka Line)
- Bangladesh Railway
- DHK-CTG Bullet Train
- History of Dhaka
