= Agargaon metro station =

Metro station in Dhaka

Agargaon আগারগাঁও
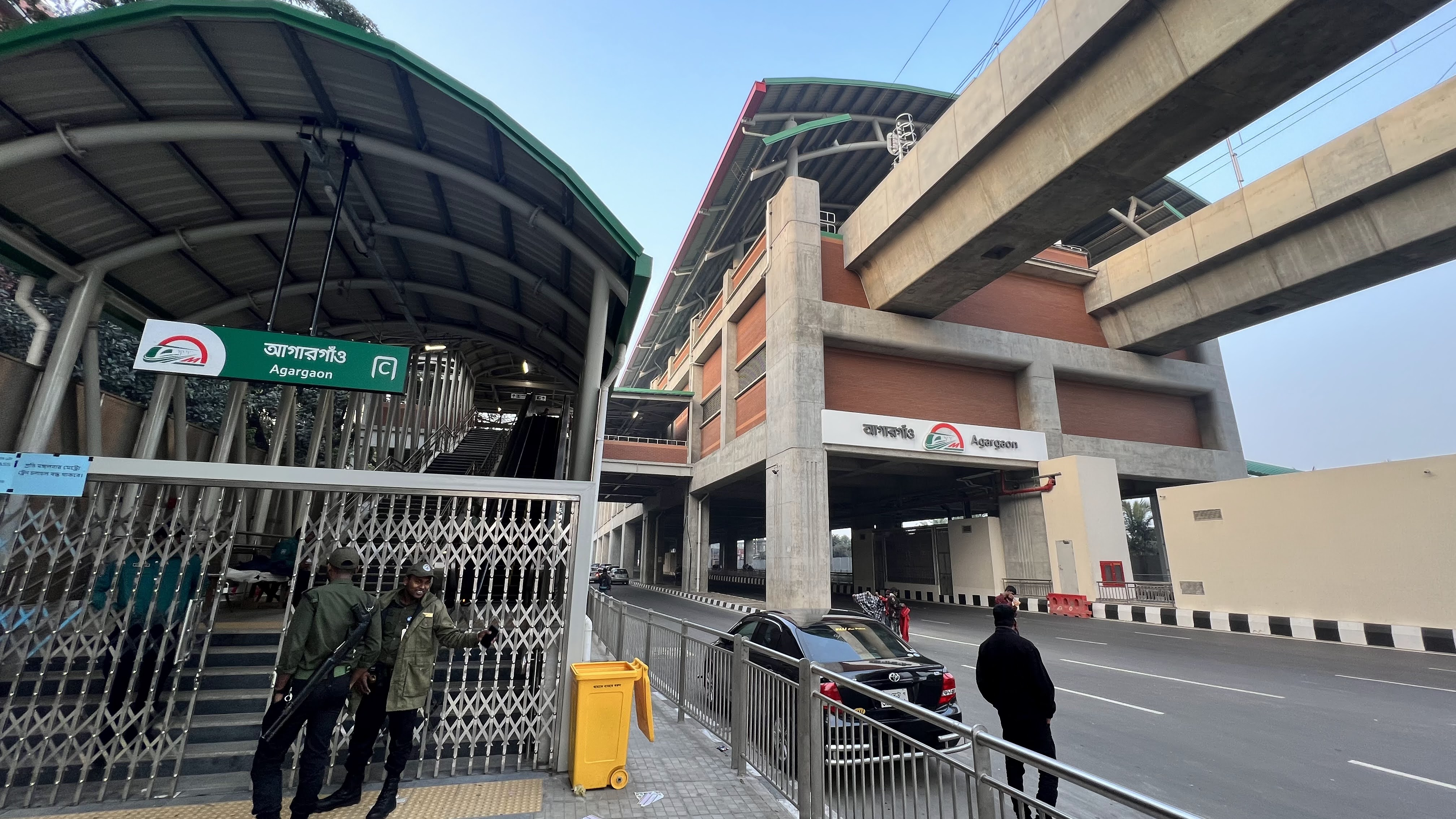
- Exterior of Agargaon metro station

General information
- Other names: Station 9
- Location: Agargaon, Dhaka; Bangladesh
- Coordinates: 23.7776907°N 90.3802056°E
- System: Dhaka Metro Rail station
- Owner: Dhaka Mass Transit Company Limited
- Line: MRT Line 6
- Platforms: Island platform
- Tracks: 2
- Bus operators: BRTC
- Connections: Begum Rokeya Avenue

Construction
- Structure type: Elevated
- Platform levels: 3
- Parking: No
- Cycle facilities: No
- Accessible: Yes

History
- Opened: 29 December 2022
- Electrified: 1,500 V DC overhead catenary

Services
Preceding station	Dhaka Metro	Following station
Shewrapara towards Uttara North	MRT Line 6	Bijoy Sarani towards Kamalapur
Route map
- Source
Location

Agargaon (Bengali: আগারগাঁও, romanised: Agargao) is an elevated metro station of the Dhaka Metro's MRT Line 6. It is located in Agargaon, and was opened on 29 December 2022.

== History ==
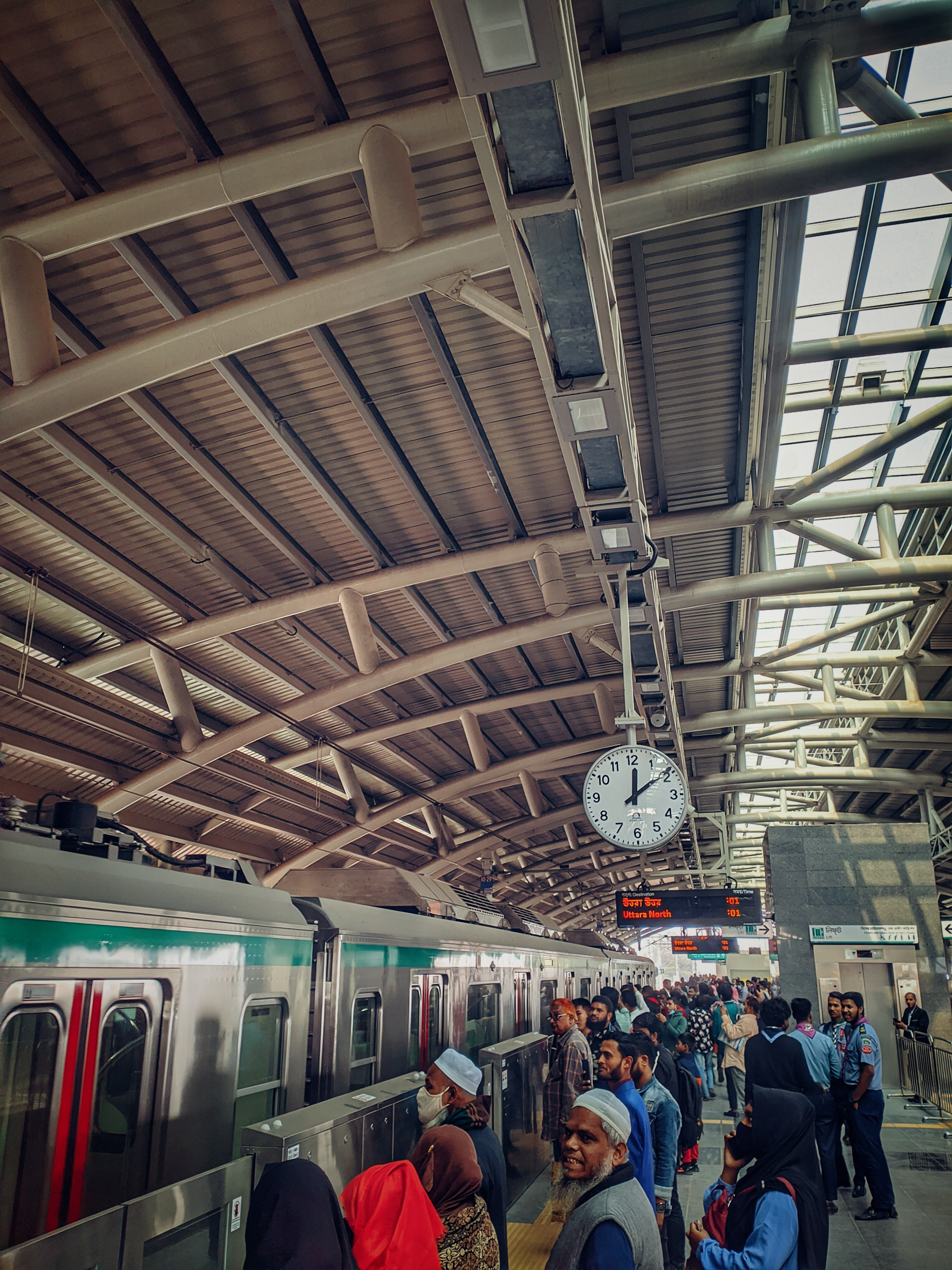
Platform of Agargaon metro station

The Agargaon Metro Station was constructed under "Package CP-03". The notification of application for construction of raised bridges for stations and railways was published on 30 June 2015 and the last date for submission of applications was 9 September 2015. Italian-Thai Development Public Company Limited gets work contract for "Package CP-03". The agreement document was sent to the ministry on 29 March 2016 for NBR investigation and law and parliamentary investigation. The signing ceremony for the agreement package was held on 3 May 2017 at the Pan Pacific Sonargaon Hotel in Dhaka. Construction work started on 2 August 2017. It was inaugurated on 29 December 2022 and opened on the next day.

== Station ==
=== Station layout ===
G	Path level	Exit / Entry
L1	Between	Rent control, station agent, metro card vending machine, crossover
L2	Platform 1 Southbound	Towards → Motijheel (To be further extended to Kamalapur in the near future) next station is Bijoy Sarani
L2	Island platform | Doors will open on the right
L2	Island platform | Doors will open on the right
L2	Platform 2 Northbound	Towards ← Uttara North next station is Shewrapara

== Connectivity ==
Bangladesh Road Transport Corporation provides shuttle bus service from the station to Motijheel via Farmgate and Shahbag.
