= Kamalapur metro station =

Metro station in Dhaka

Kamalapur কমলাপুর
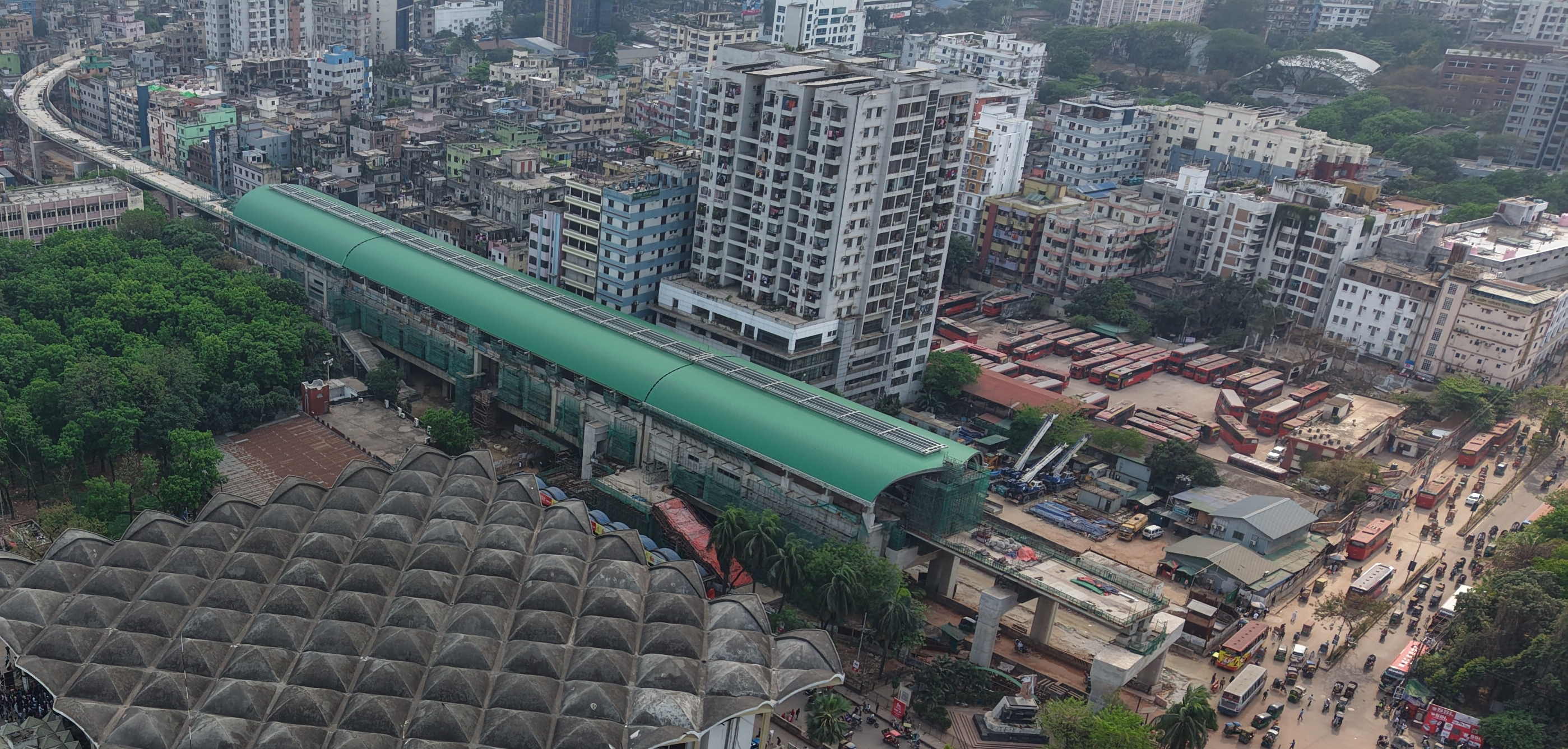
- The station under construction in March 2026

General information
- Other names: Station 17
- Location: Kamalapur, Motijheel Thana, Dhaka; Bangladesh
- Coordinates: 23.7329588°N 90.4254561°E
- System: Dhaka Metro Rail station
- Owner: Dhaka Mass Transit Company Limited
- Lines: MRT Line 1 MRT Line 2 MRT Line 4 MRT Line 6
- Platforms: Side platform
- Tracks: 2

Construction
- Structure type: Elevated
- Platform levels: 3
- Parking: No
- Cycle facilities: No
- Accessible: Yes

History
- Opening: 1 January 2027
- Electrified: 1,500 V DC overhead catenary

Services
Preceding station	Dhaka Metro	Following station
Rajarbagh towards Dhaka Airport or Purbachal Terminal	MRT Line 1	Terminus
Arambagh towards Gabtoli	MRT Line 2	Mugda towards Narayanganj
Terminus	MRT Line 4	Sayedabad towards Madanpur
Motijheel towards Uttara North	MRT Line 6	Terminus
Route map
- Source
Location

Kamalapur metro station (Bengali: কমলাপুর মেট্রো স্টেশন), is an elevated metro station of the Dhaka Metro's MRT Line 6, currently under construction. This station is located in Kamalapur, adjacent to Kamalapur railway station. It is scheduled to be opened in 2027 and is integrated as MRT Line 6's third phase.

== Overview ==
The extension of MRT Line 6 from Motijheel to Kamalapur railway station was planned by the government in 2019. In the next year, Bangladesh Railway and Dhaka Mass Transit Company Limited agreed to connect Kamalapur railway station with MRT Line 6 of Dhaka Metro Rail. But as the current station could not match the proposed route of MRT Line 6, it was decided to demolish the Kamalapur station and construct a new one 130 meters north. Various architects and individuals of the country opposed this decision. On 30 January 2021, the Prime Minister's Office gave permission to demolish the railway station, but in February, the Railway Ministry withdrew its decision to demolish Kamalapur. However, related authority said that the railway station may be shifted in the near future if required. Instead of demolishing the station, the government plans to construct a station complex for metrorail, subway, elevated express and bus rapid transit under the railway station area as part of the multimodal hub that is scheduled to be completed by 2030. However, Kajima, the Japanese construction firm responsible for the construction of a multimodal transport hub in Kamalapur, stated that it would withdraw from this project if the government planned to extend the metro line. (Note: The reason for Kajima's objection is unknown, but according to the railway authority, the extension project conflicts with the construction of the hub.) As a result, DMTCL proposed three options to Kajima for extending the line. The first proposal is to build a station on Line 6 above Kamalapur metro station on Line 1 which is underground. The second option was to build the metro station outside the railway station area. According to the third proposal, they will apply for land from the Ministry of Railways for constructing the station.

Extending the line up to Kamalapur would increase the length of the line to about 21 km. The extension pushes the completion date for the line to 2026. The extension work started in January 2023.
