= Uttara North metro station =

Metro station in Dhaka

Uttara North উত্তরা উত্তর
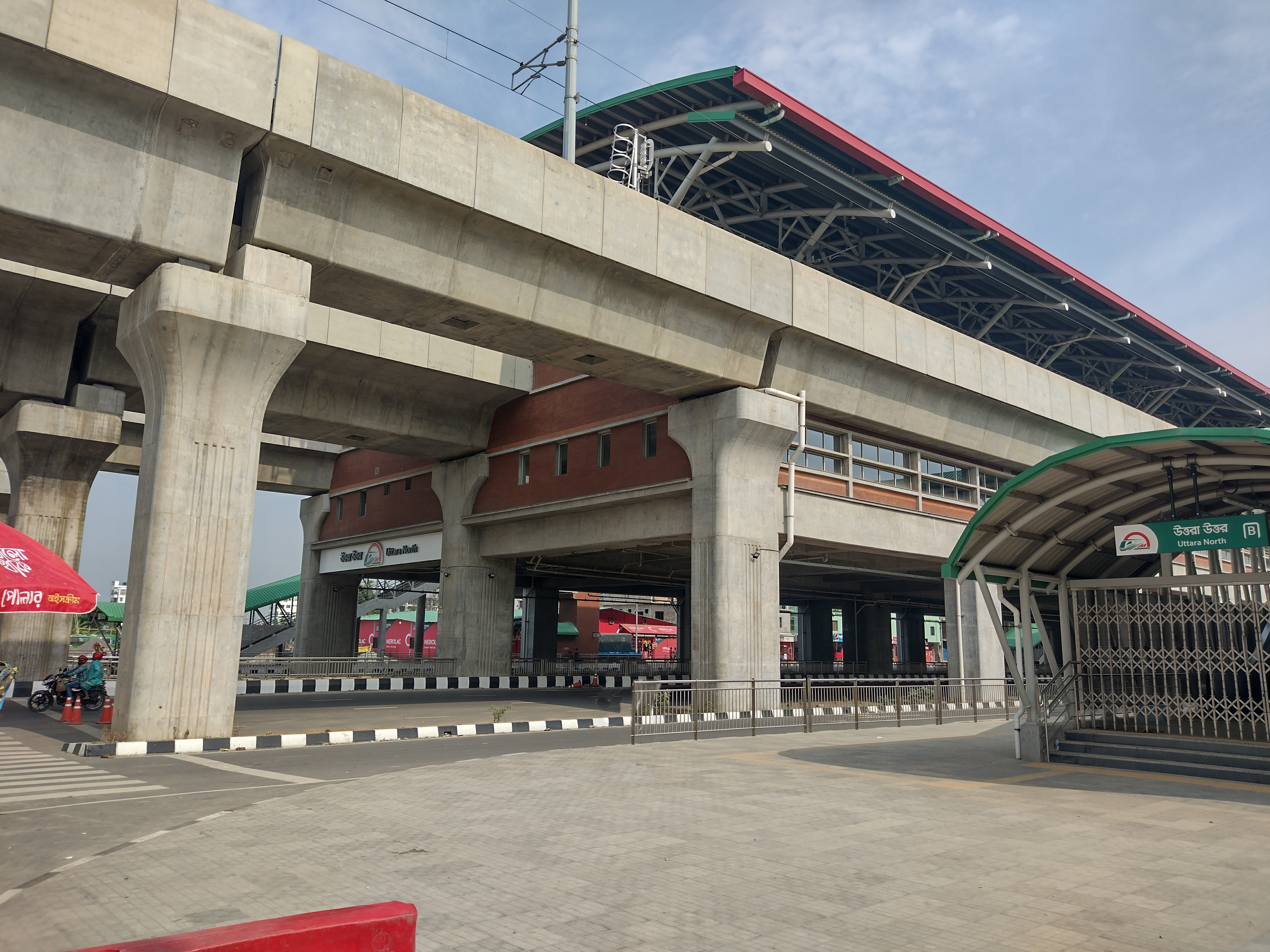
- Station building

General information
- Other names: Station 1
- Location: Diabari Bottola, Ahmed Sofa Sarani, Sector 15, Uttara, Dhaka; Bangladesh
- Coordinates: 23.8693551°N 90.3674846°E
- System: Dhaka Metro Rail station
- Owner: Dhaka Mass Transit Company Limited
- Line: MRT Line 6
- Platforms: Side platform
- Tracks: 2
- Bus operators: BRTC
- Connections: Sonargaon Janapath

Construction
- Structure type: Elevated
- Platform levels: 3
- Parking: No
- Cycle facilities: No
- Accessible: Yes

History
- Opened: 29 December 2022
- Electrified: 1,500 V DC overhead catenary

Services
Preceding station	Dhaka Metro	Following station
Terminus	MRT Line 6	Uttara Center towards Kamalapur
Route map
- Source
Location

Uttara North (Bengali: উত্তরা উত্তর, romanised: Uttora uttor) is an elevated metro station of the Dhaka Metro Rail's MRT Line 6. This station is located in Uttara, a neighbourhood of Dhaka. It was opened on 29 December 2022.

== History ==
The Uttara North Metro Station was constructed under "Package CP-03". The notification of application for construction of raised bridges for stations and railways was published on 30 June 2015 and the last date for submission of applications was 9 September 2015. The Italian-Thai Development Public Company Limited received the work contract for "Package CP-03". The agreement was signed in a ceremony on 3 May 2017, and construction work started on 2 August 2017. It was inaugurated on 28 December 2022 and opened for use on the next day.

== Station ==
=== Station layout ===
G	Path level	Exit / Entry
L1	Between	Rent control, station agent, metro card vending machine, crossover
L2	Side platform | Doors will open on the left
L2	Platform 1 Southbound	Towards → Motijheel next station is Uttara Center
L2	Platform 2 Northbound	Towards ← Train Terminates Here
L2	Side platform | Doors will open on the left
L2

== Connectivity ==
Bangladesh Road Transport Corporation provides shuttle bus service from the station to House Building.
