= Dhaka Mass Transit Company Limited =

Mass transit company in Dhaka

- Company type: Government-owned company
- Industry: Rapid transit
- Founded: 3 June 2013; 13 years ago
- Headquarters: Metrorail Bhaban, Diabari Depot, Sonargaon Janapath, Uttara, Dhaka, Bangladesh
- Area served: Dhaka metropolis and adjoining areas
- Key people: Faruque Ahmed
- Owner: Government of Bangladesh
- Parent: Dhaka Transport Coordination Authority
- Divisions: Road Transport and Highways Division
- Website: dmtcl.gov.bd

Dhaka Mass Transit Company Limited, commonly known as DMTCL, is a government-owned company responsible for operating Dhaka Metro Rail, a mass rapid transit system in the Bangladeshi capital Dhaka and adjoining areas. The company was established on 3 June 2013 under the Companies Act 1994, a law that governs incorporated entities in Bangladesh. Out of 5 metro lines planned by the DMTCL, the MRT Line 6 was inaugurated on 28 December 2022 by Prime Minister Sheikh Hasina.

== Managing directors ==
- M.A.N. Siddique (2017–2024)
- Mohammad Abdur Rouf (2024–2025)
- Faruque Ahmed (2025–present)
