= MRT Line 6 =

Mass rapid transit line of Dhaka Metro

Mass Rapid Transit Line 6
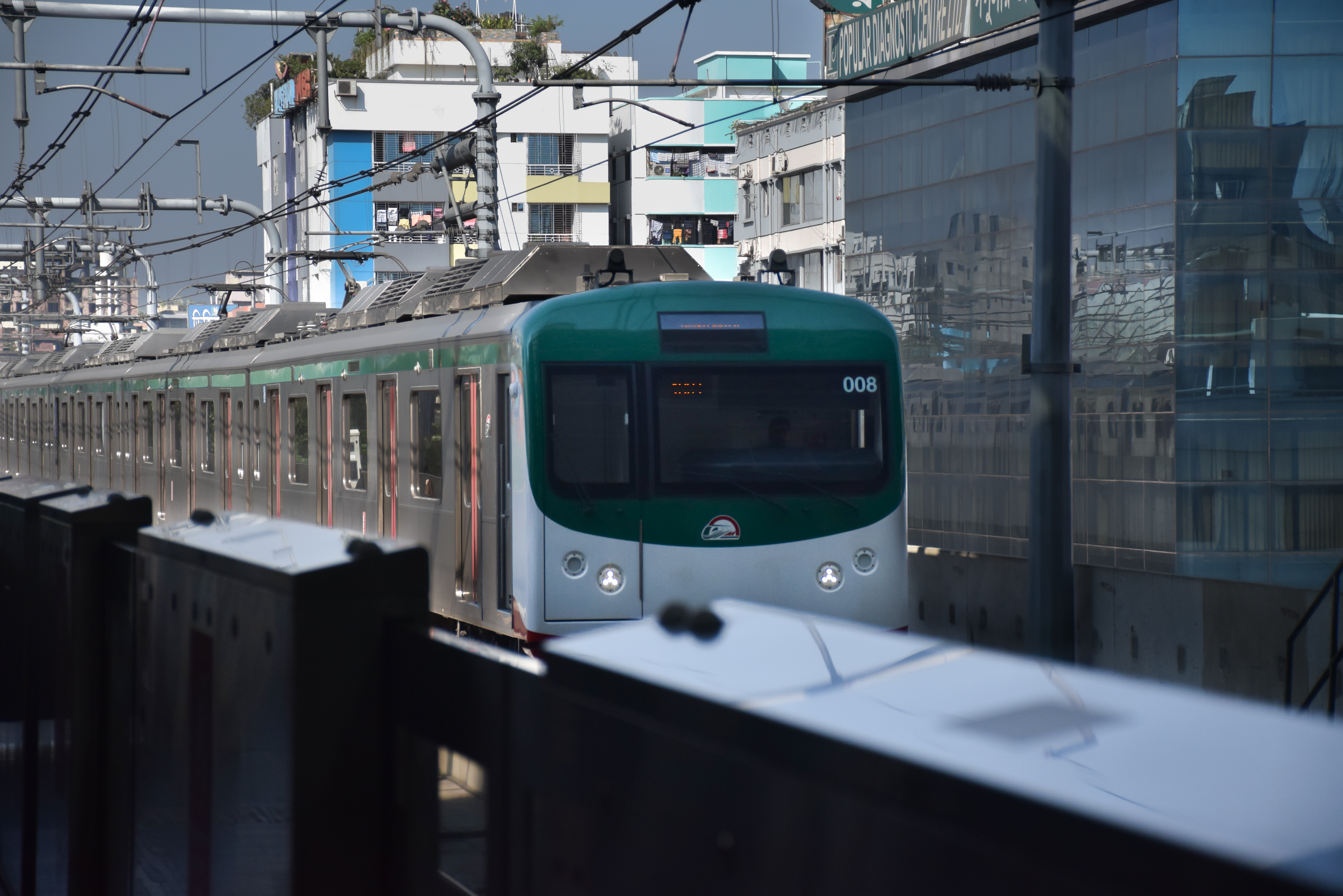
- Dhaka Metro train at Agargaon metro station

Overview
- Other name: Dhaka Metro Rail Line 6
- Native name: ম্যাস র‍্যাপিড ট্রানজিট লাইন ৬
- Status: Operational
- Owner: Road Transport and Highways Division
- Locale: Greater Dhaka, Bangladesh
- Termini: Uttara North (North); Motijheel (South)
- Stations: 22 (16 operational)
- Colour on map: Green (#006747)

Service
- Type: Rapid transit
- System: Dhaka Metro Rail
- Train number: 12
- Operator: Dhaka Mass Transit Company Limited
- Depot: Diabari
- Rolling stock: Kawasaki Railcar Manufacturing
- Daily ridership: est. 400,000

History
- Work began: 26 June 2016
- Opened: 29 December 2022; 3 years ago

Technical
- Line length: 21.26 kilometres (13.21 mi) (20.1 kilometres (12.5 mi) operational)
- Num of tracks: 2
- Character: Elevated
- Track gauge: 1,435 mm (4 ft 8 1/2 in) standard gauge
- Electrification: 1,500 V DC overhead catenary
- Operating speed: 100 km/h (62 mph)
- Signalling: Communications-based train control
- Highest elevation: 13 metres (43 ft)
Route map

The MRT Line 6 (Bengali: এমআরটি লাইন ৬) is a rapid transit line of the Dhaka Metro Rail. Despite its number, it is Bangladesh's first rapid transit line and has been in service since 2022. The line is entirely elevated and currently has 16 stations operational in service between Uttara North and Motijheel.

The line was built as a proposal of a mass rapid transit system in Dhaka by the Review Committee of the Strategic Transport Plan and the Urban Traffic Formulation Study.

Its construction started in 2016 but was delayed several times as a result of disagreements about the route, the July 2016 Dhaka attack, and the COVID-19 pandemic. The first phase of the line was gradually opened in 2022 from Uttara North to Agargaon. In 2023, the second phase of the line was inaugurated from Agargaon to Motijheel.

An extension to Kamalapur is expected to inaugurate on 1 January 2027. There is a plan to further extend the line north towards Tongi. It is the most expensive mass rapid transit line in terms of per kilometer construction cost in Asia.

== History ==
=== Origins and development ===
Proposed routes of Dhaka Metro Rail by Japan International Cooperation Agency in 2011

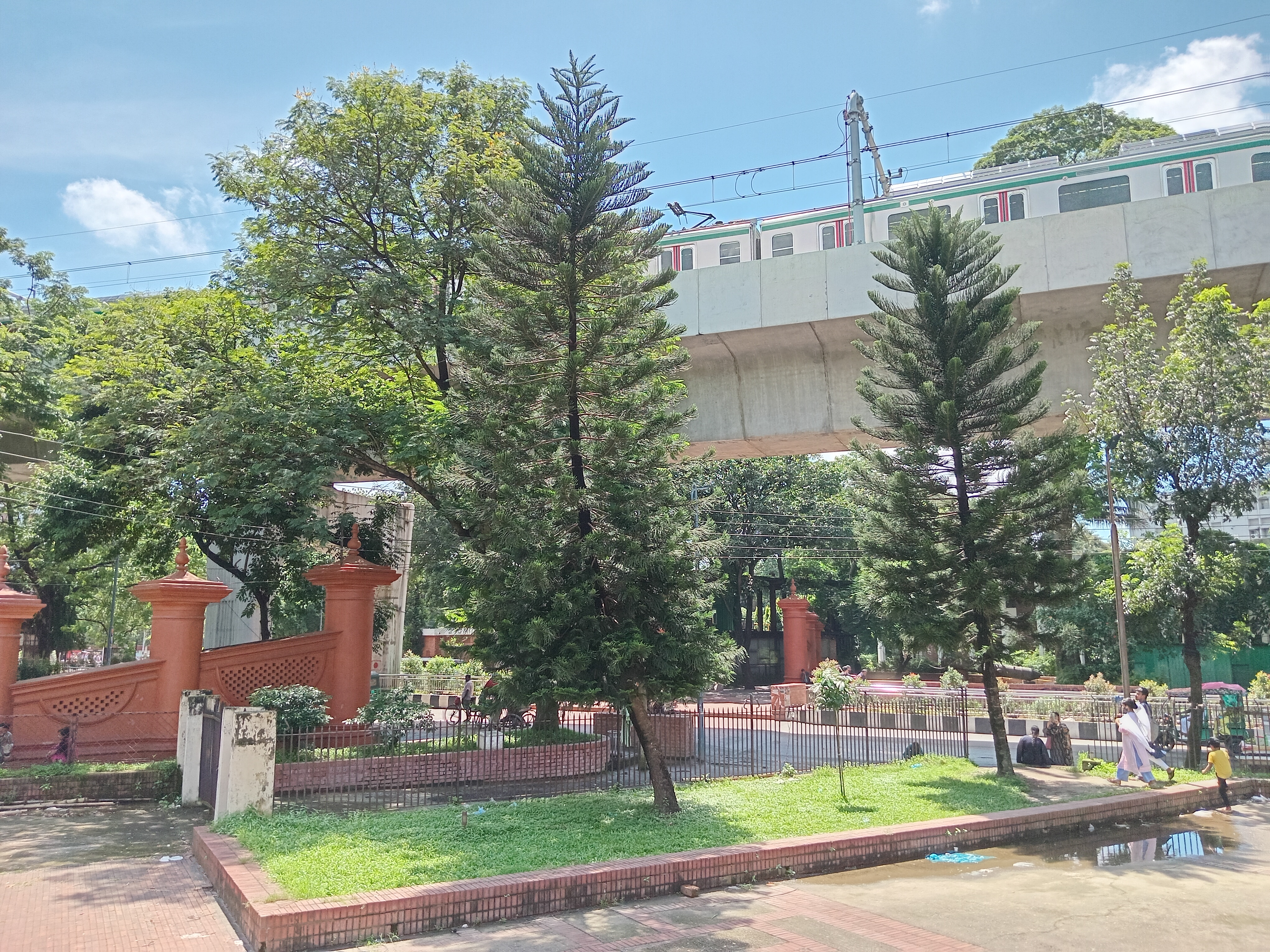
The line has been constructed near a historical structure called Dhaka Gate located in Ramna in violation of the National Heritage Conservation Policy.

In 2005, the World Bank published a study report, recommending that the government of Bangladesh build a mass transit system in Dhaka. In the same year, American consultancy firm Louis Berger Group prepared a strategic transport plan (STP) for Dhaka. Although the World Bank helped to develop this plan, the draft plan didn't include a mass rapid transit system. It was Bangladeshi civil engineer and national professor Jamilur Reza Choudhury, chairman of the Review Committee of the STP, and his team who suggested a mass rapid transit system be included in the plan. The published STP recommended the construction of three mass rapid transit lines, of which the alignment of MRT Line 6 was proposed from Pallabi via Begum Rokeya Avenue to Sayedabad Bus Terminal via Tejgaon and Sonargaon hotel areas. Three years after the preparation of the study report by the World Bank, the Japan International Cooperation Agency (JICA) joined the metro rail project. In the Urban Traffic Formulation Study, JICA considered MRT Line 6 the most profitable and important of the proposed lines. A feasibility study was conducted for the construction of this line in the financial year 2010–2011. At the time, the agency's urban transport expert team proposed to construct it as a monorail instead of fully underground.

A draft route was mapped in 2011. According to this map, the line was supposed to be from Uttara to Sayedabad. The proposed station at Bijoy Sarani was to be built in front of the Bangabandhu Military Museum, but due to the objection of the Bangladesh Air Force in 2011, it was planned to be built near the Jatiya Sangsad Bhaban. Also, the height of the dome of the station had to be reduced to keep it out of reach of the airport funnel for the nearby Tejgaon Airport. As per the proposed route map, the line was supposed to pass in front of Begum Rokeya Hall, one of residential buildings of the University of Dhaka. However, due to the objection of the authorities, the government took the initiative to revise the alignment. The draft route included the Mayor Mohammed Hanif Flyover. However, at the request of the Dhaka Traffic Coordination Board (now Dhaka Transport Coordination Authority or DTCA), its route was diverted from the flyover. So it was planned to change the route and take it to Sayedabad via Motijheel. The draft route was supposed to pass the line through Mirpur Cantonment. However the Bangladesh Army objected as it wanted to make the area a residential area, so the line was moved eastward. Even though the line was planned to pass by Tejgaon Airport, later Prime Minister Sheikh Hasina ordered to change the decision considering national security. (Note: The Prime Minister said at a Cabinet meeting that she ordered to change the design as the airport would have been closed if MRT Line 6 was built in front of it.)

Jamilur Reza Choudhury requested the prime minister to change the destination of the line from Sayedabad to Motijheel. He also suggested taking the route through Banglamotor. Later, the route map was modified slightly to finalize the current route map. JICA wanted to build three metro stations at Uttara above ground, and the remaining stations underground, but E. Sreedharan, an Indian mass transit expert, recommended building an entirely elevated line, as he believed an underground metro line would be to expensive to build and operate. This resulted in the current route, which is entirely on an elevated track. The MRT Line 6 project was officially launched on 1 July 2012. On 18 December 2012, the project was approved by the Executive Committee of the National Economic Council (ECNEC) and in the next year, JICA hired a consultant and financed the construction of MRT Line 6 and its operator Dhaka Mass Transit Company Limited (DMTCL) was established. Delhi Metro Rail Corporation was also the line's consultant. In 2014, the project officials completed the design of metro station of the line. Its conceptual design was created two years after its approval by ECNEC. The finalised version of STP, revised in 2016, proposed the construction of five mass rapid transit lines in Dhaka including this line. (Note: The proposed lines were MRT Line 1, MRT Line 2, MRT Line 4 and MRT Line 5 excluding this line.)

Before the line's construction, there were three obstacles in the northern Uttara-Mirpur section. The first obstacle was the narrowness of the local pathway from Uttara to Mirpur, which made it impossible to carry out construction work there. The second obstacle was a lake between Uttara and Mirpur. The third was the Sri Sri Gaur Nitai temple located in the route which needed to be moved. Road Transport and Highways Division planned to convert the pathway into a street to remove the first obstacle. In the case of the second, it was decided to fill the marked area of the lake and remove the soil after the piling work was completed there. After the government held talks with the temple authority, they announced the transfer of the temple, thereby solving all the issues. After determining the route of the line by the side of Shaheed Minar, it was planned to change the route in the face of objection and take it in front of Teacher-Student Centre, University of Dhaka. In protest of this, the students of Dhaka University conducted various activities from 7 January 2016. They cited the possibility of damage to structures in the university premises, increased traffic jams and disruption to campus activities as reasons for their opposition. On 16 January 2016, the Bangladesh Students Union supported the protesting students at Dhaka University and proposed to take the route through Shahbag in front of Matsya Bhaban instead of taking it inside Dhaka University as it would be illegal to take the route of MRT Line 6 through Dhaka University area. (Note: According to the National Heritage Conservation Policy, "no heavy structure can be constructed within 200 square meters of any historical structure or archaeological site".) On the other hand, Road Transport and Bridges Minister Obaidul Quader ruled out the possibility of moving the metro route from Dhaka University as the construction work would start in two months. He informed that there will be no problem in the activities of the university as sound insulation technology will be used on the metro rail line. Meetings were held with students to resolve the dispute. After discussing the benefits of a metro station in the Dhaka University area, they withdrew their opposition. The authority of Bangabandhu Sheikh Mujib Medical University (BSMMU) objected to the decision of the DTCA to take the proposed route through BSMMU. They were later convinced by DTCA that a station near BSMMU could benefit the patients. On 27 March 2016, DMTCL signed an agreement with Tokyu Construction Ltd for the development of the line's depot.

=== Initial phases ===
==== Construction ====
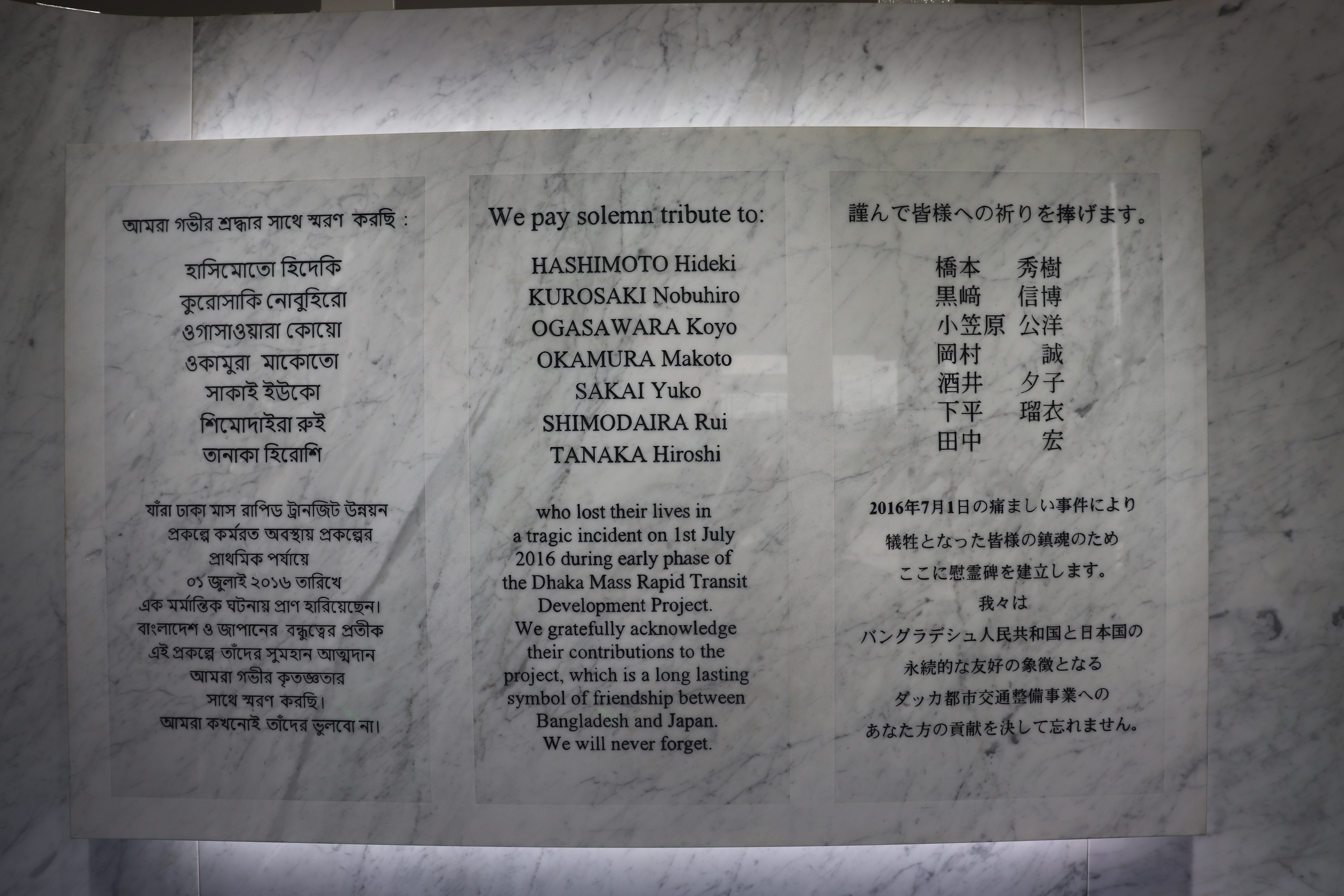
A memorial for seven Japanese officials of the project died during July 2016 Dhaka attack at Metro Rail Exhibition and Information Centre in Diabari, Dhaka

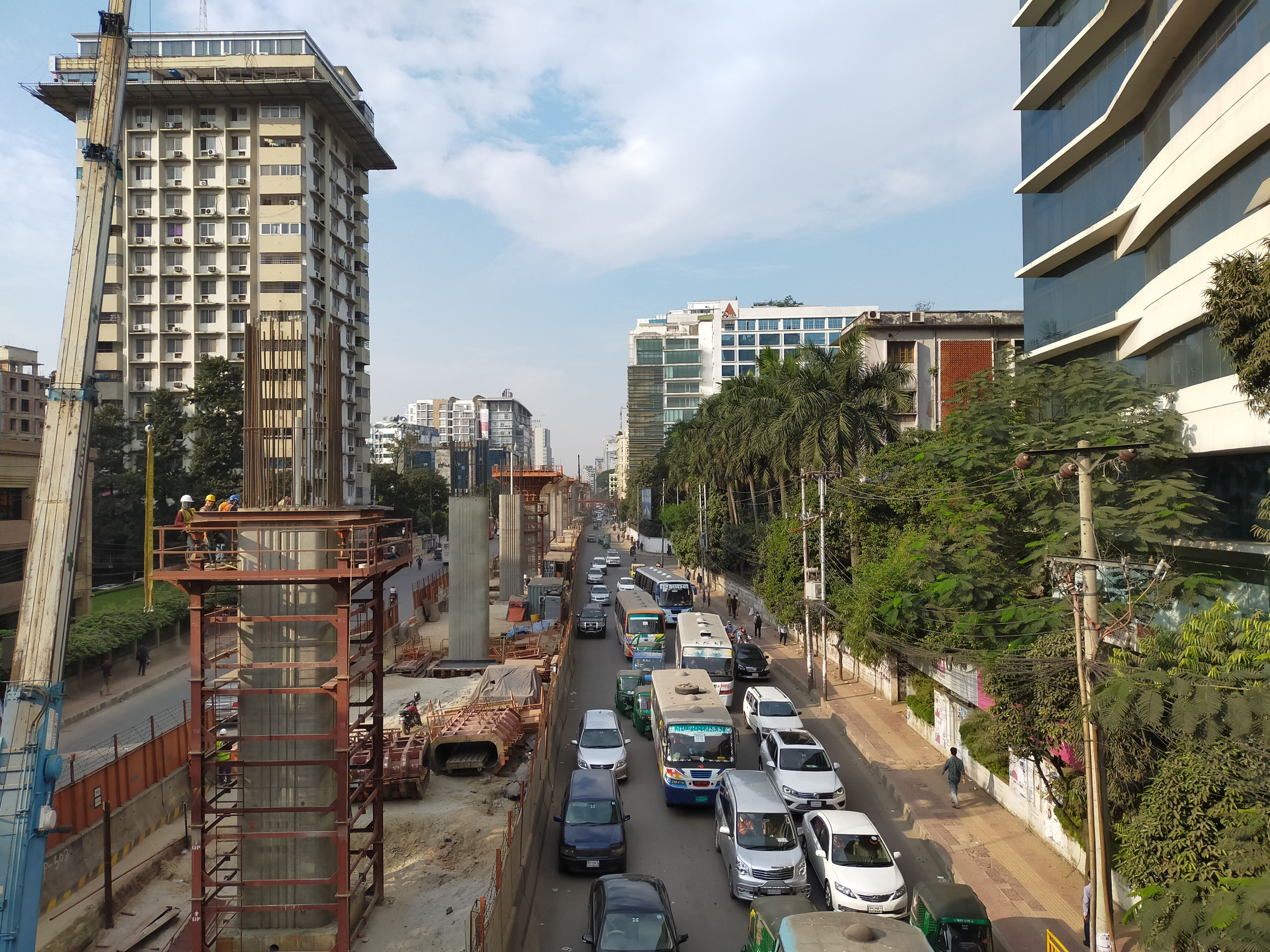
Construction of MRT Line 6 at Kazi Nazrul Islam Avenue in December 2019

JICA divided the entire construction project into 6 packages. The first two packages included construction of the line's depot. The construction project was inaugurated on 26 June 2016. The July 2016 Dhaka attack took place during the call for tenders for the construction of the line, and led to some companies withdrawing from the tender process due to security concerns. Seven Japanese officials associated with the project died in the attack. About 4 days after the attack, Gowher Rizvi, foreign affairs adviser of the country, said that the attack would not have any negative impact on construction. He wanted to wait a maximum of three months for foreign officials who left after the attack. Six months later, with the assurance of the government, the contractors started the construction work. A detailed design of the line was prepared in August 2016. In September 2016, works related to the construction of the line's depot at Diabari were started. On 2 August 2017, the first phase of construction of the MRT Line 6 was officially started.

DMTCL hired seven contracting firms to work in joint ventures to execute the construction works. One of those seven contracting firms was Abdul Monem Limited, which was the sole Bangladeshi contractor for the construction project. Also the contractor for a significant part of the construction work was Italian-Thai Development. As of October 2017, the construction was 20.19% complete with 1% progress. After two months, it was known that 13.16% of the initial budget was spent on the construction of the project. By 2018, utility transfer was completed for the project from Uttara to Agargaon in the route area. In April 2018, the installation of spans between the pillars of the line began. On 11 July 2018, the joint venture of Marubeni and Larsen & Toubro started electrical and mechanical work on the project. Work of the second phase started from August of the same year. In February 2019, work began on the viaduct and stations on the Agargaon to Kawran Bazar section of the under-construction line. Till then the overall average progress of the project was 21.50% and the progress of the first phase was 35%. As of 15 December 2019, 8.15 km (5.06 mi) of viaducts of a total length of 20 km (12.43 mi) of the line had been laid. According to the schedule, its rail track was supposed to be laid in the first month of 2020.

In March 2020, as the COVID-19 pandemic escalated, foreigners involved in the project stopped working and left the country. The lockdown imposed by the government during the pandemic halted construction for several months. However, when the government allowed work in accordance with the rules to prevent infection, construction work was resumed. As of October 2020, the construction of Phase 2 was lagging behind Phase 1. A news article published by Prothom Alo attributed this to a later start of construction than the first phase and COVID-19. In 2021, JICA urged the government to take necessary measures to prevent the spread of infection among the officials and employees involved in the project. The government set up two makeshift hospitals, isolation centers and makeshift dormitories to prevent transmission. During the pandemic, 668 people involved in construction contracted COVID-19.

Erecting of all spans of Phase 1 was completed on 28 February 2021. As of February 2021, the construction progress of the Kawran Bazar to Motijheel section of the second phase was 56%. Installation of all viaducts on the line was completed on 27 January 2022. The construction of its depot was completed in June 2022. Two months after that, the construction progress of MRT Line 6 was 67%. M.A.N. Siddique, managing director of DMTCL, was sure that the project would be successful despite the reserve crisis in 2022. As of November 2022, the construction progress was 84.22%, while the progress of the first phase from Uttara to Agargaon was at 95%. As of 8 February 2023, after 41 days of the opening of the first phase, at least 92% of the second phase of the line was complete. ABM Amin Ullah Nuri, the secretary of the Road Transport and Highways Division, said on 9 August 2023 that the second phase would be completed by 15 October. However, the construction of all the stations was planned to be completed by December. But later it was announced that the construction of all the stations would be completed one month late. On 27 November 2023, it was decided to connect Farmgate, Shahbag and Bangladesh Secretariat metro stations with the pedestrian bridge, Bangabandhu Sheikh Mujib Medical University and Bangladesh Secretariat respectively by constructing skywalks. As of October 2024 DMTCL's new Managing Director Mohammad Abdur Rouf was considering a meeting with Cabinet Secretary Sheikh Abdur Rashid to implement the skywalk between the Secretariat and the metro station.

==== Trial runs and opening ====
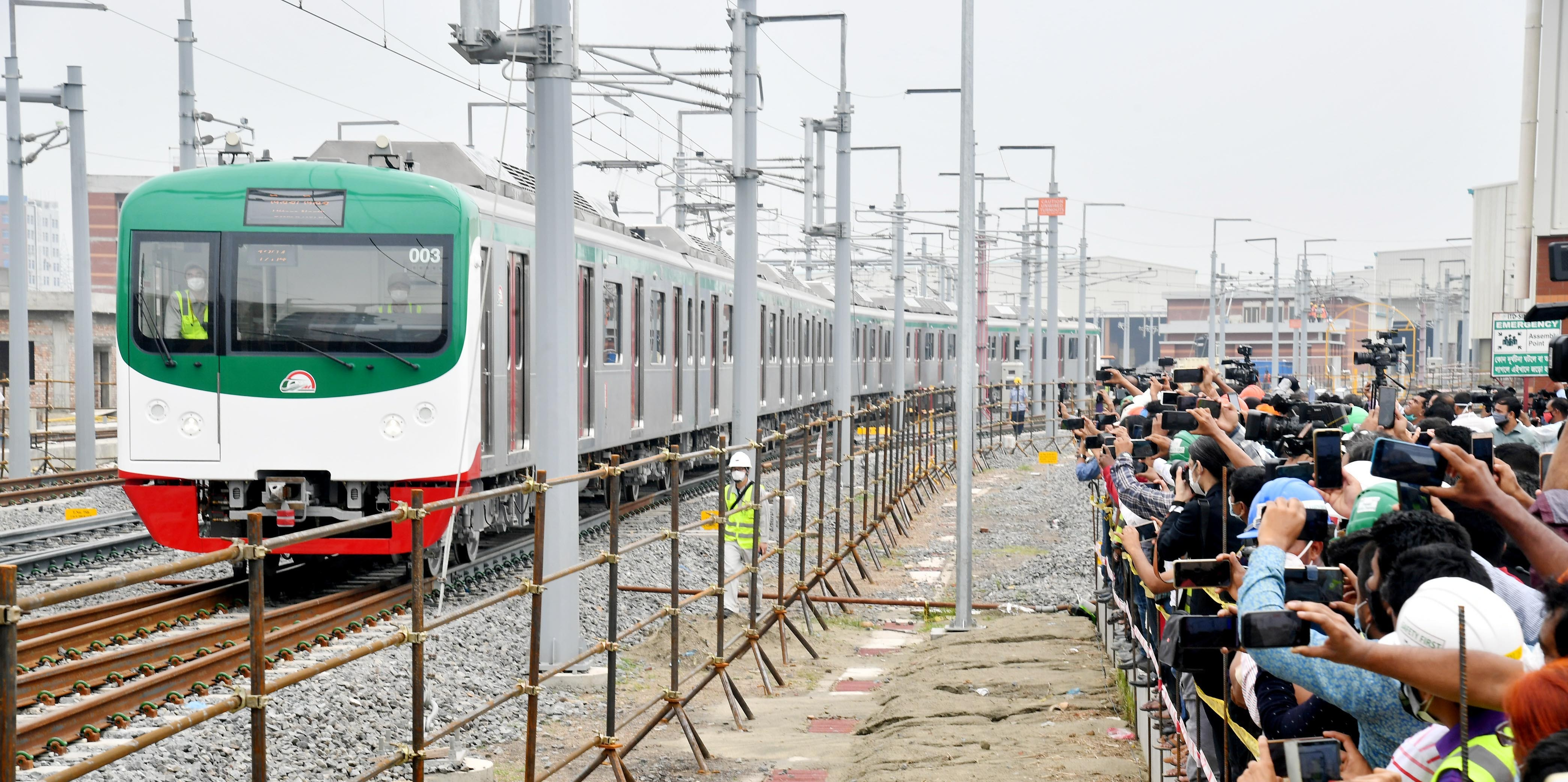
Trial run at Diabari depot on 11 May 2021

Initially, the deadline for construction of the line was in 2024. But Sheikh Hasina had instructed to complete the first phase by 2019 and the second phase by 2020. However, as progress was 16% below the target as of 2019, a proposal was made to extend the construction period by another three months. Later, the Ministry of Road Transport and Bridges planned to commission the entire line in 2021 to mark the country's 50 years of independence. Then phase 1 and 2 were scheduled to be completed by 2025 by DMTCL. On 29 August 2021, the trial run of the trains on the line under construction began. It traveled from Diabari Depot to Mirpur 11 that day. The line's train made its longest trial run on 12 December 2021. It traveled from Uttara to Agargaon. The train ran for 11.3 km (7.0 mi). It ran at 100 km/h (62 mph) for 9 km (5.6 mi) and ran at 15–20 km (9.3–12.4 mi) for the rest. Since the work was not completed, the opening date of the first phase was changed to 16 December of the next year. From 1 September 2022, the authority started the integrated trial run of the line from Uttara to Agargaon. A total of 4 trial runs were operated on the Uttara–Agargaon section. All the work on Phase 1 was supposed to be completed by 15 December and Sheikh Hasina wanted to inaugurate the Uttara–Agargaon section after the Victory Day. DMTCL later proposed to open the first phase portion of the line in the last week of December 2022. Based on the proposal, the inauguration date was fixed on 28 December. On 28 December 2022, the section between Uttara and Agargaon was inaugurated by Sheikh Hasina. The following day, public operations started with trains running non-stop between the two terminals. More stations were gradually introduced into service between January and March. Since 31 March 2023, all nine stations from Uttara to Agargaon on the line are in use.

On 13 April 2023, Obaidul Quader announced the opening of Phase 2 in November of the same year. On 18 May 2023, DMTCL announced a trial run from Agargaon to Motijheel in July of the same year. DMTCL was aiming to launch the second phase by December 2023. As the government decided to launch the second phase by November, the project officials had planned to reduce the number of trial runs on the Agargaon–Motijheel section. On 18 June 2023, Obaidul Quader informed that Sheikh Hasina will inaugurate Phase 2 in October 2023. First trial run from Agargaon to Motijheel started on 7 July 2023. On 20 August 2023, it was announced that the second phase will be opened after two months. Later the inauguration date was postponed by three days. Five days after the date change was announced, the inauguration date was changed again to 29 October. It was decided to shut down metro services for two days for system integration from 14 October to 15 to make the entire line operational. The inauguration date of Phase 2 was again pushed back to 4 November, showing that the prime minister could not give the time on 29 October 2023. Metro stations at Farmgate, Bangladesh Secretariat and Motijheel were opened the day after the second phase was inaugurated in 4 November. All stations went operational by 31 December 2023.

=== Kamalapur extension ===
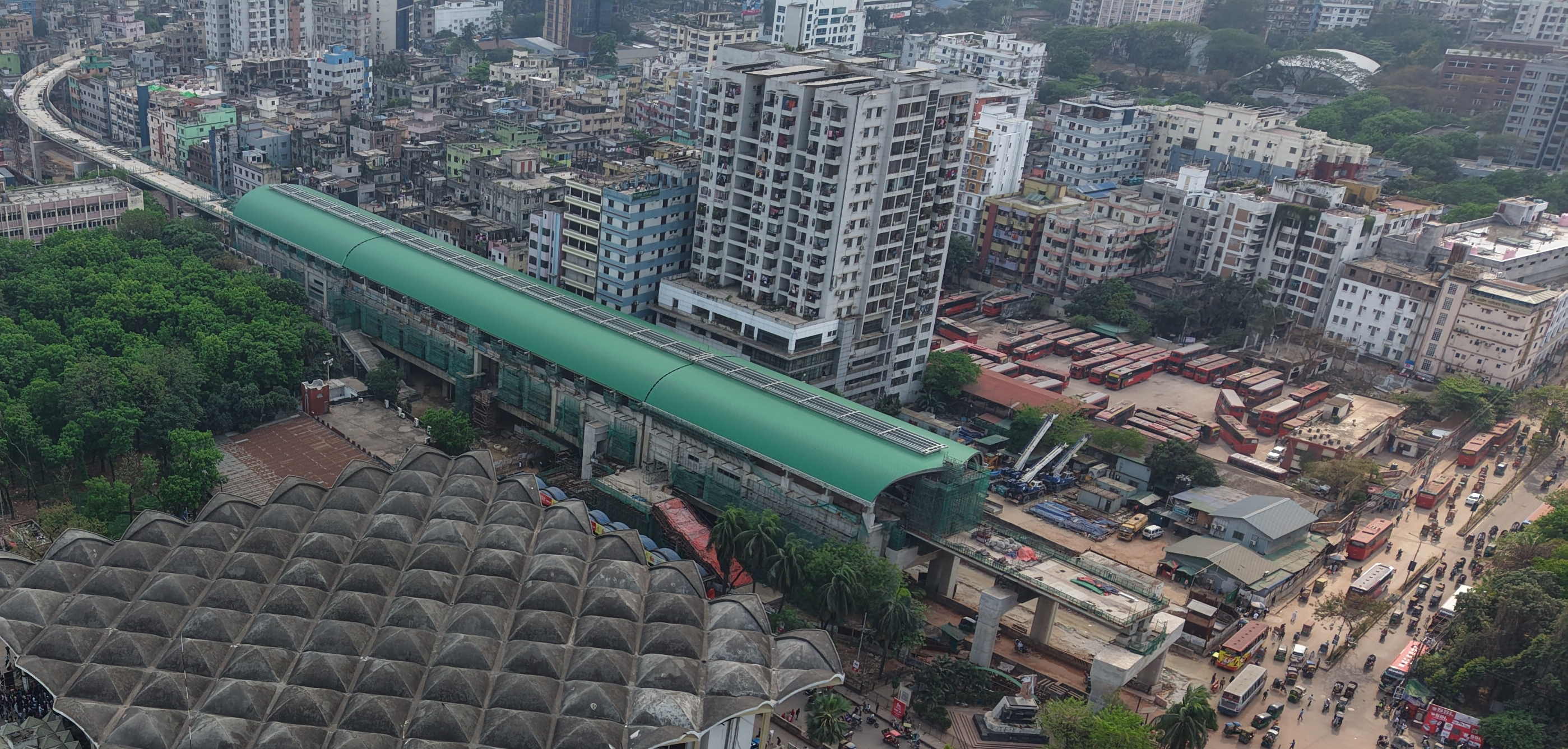
Construction of Kamalapur metro station in March 2026

STP had plans to extend the MRT Line 6 from Motijheel to Kamalapur railway station. The extension project was decided to be started by the government in 2019. However, Kajima, the Japanese construction firm responsible for the construction of a multimodal transport hub in Kamalapur, stated that it would withdraw from this project if the government planned to extend the metro line. Bangladesh Railway opposed the extension project of the line with Kajima. (Note: The reason for Bangladesh Railway and Kajima's objection is unknown. but according to the railway source, the extension conflicts with the construction of the hub.) As a result, DMTCL proposed three options to Kajima for extending the line. The first proposal is to build a station on Line 6 above the proposed Kamalapur metro station on Line 1 which is underground. The second option was to build the metro station outside the railway station area. According to the third proposal, they needed to apply for land from the ministry of Railways for constructing the station. The second proposal was finalized after a meeting between Bangladesh Railway and DMTCL on 24 November 2020.

When the contractors involved in the construction project were asked to join the extension project, companies other than Italian-Thai Development showed no interest that delayed the extension. Extending the line up to Kamalapur would increase the length of the line to about 21 km (13 mi). The extension pushes the completion date for the line to December 2025. The extension work started west of the station plaza in January 2023 by Italian-Thai Development. Piling began in late February. As of May 2023, 38 out of 176 have been completed. As of 1 June 2023, at least 2.30% of the third phase was complete. Seven months after the commencement of work on the Kamalapur expansion project, its progress stood at 10%. In November 2023, the progress of Kamalapur extension stood at 17.30%. As on 31 December 2023, the progress was said to be 25%.

But in the meantime, the expansion work was stopped for about a month due to complications in the transfer of utility of Titas Gas. Later the deadline for the extension was finalised to June 2025. 47 structures in South Kamalapur were demolished for the Kamalapur extension project. On 21 March 2024, work on laying the viaduct began as part of the expansion project. As of May 2024, 24 out of 30 columns have been constructed and 37% of the construction work is complete. The completion of the first floor of the Kamalapur metro station was scheduled to begin next month. According to the information provided by DMTCL officials, the time to complete the construction of Kamalapur extension had been proposed to be extended by another 6 months. Construction progress rose another 2% in September of the same year. As of February 2025, the progress of the extension work had reached 50%. However, due to the delays to appoint a contractor for the technical work, the completion date remained uncertain. In July 2025, it was reported that the government had signed a contract worth ৳465 crore with the previous joint venture for the electromechanical work of the extension.

=== Future plans ===
According to the preliminary plan, the route of MRT Line 1 was to be extended to Gazipur, but it was omitted as Dhaka BRT was under construction on the same route. Alternatively, DMTCL planned to take MRT Line 6 north to Gazipur. In 2022, M.A.N. Siddique, showed the interest to extend the line to Tongi. ABM Amin Ullah Nuri confirmed in April 2023 that the construction of the extension from Uttara North to Tongi would start after the completion of the extension from Motijheel to Kamalapur. As of 1 May 2023, DMTCL planned to conduct a pre-feasibility study for the Tongi extension. It was decided to start the feasibility study approximately two weeks after the announcement of the pre-feasibility study. According to the completed pre-feasibility study, the Tongi extension initially planned to increase the length of the line by 4.61 km (2.86 mi). As of January 2024, another survey for Tongi extension was ongoing. In May 2024, DMTCL announced a 7.5 km (4.66 mi) extension to from Diabari to Tongi including five additional stations. The last station would planned to be built near Tongi Junction railway station. According to DMTCL authorities in June 2024, the ongoing survey is scheduled to be completed by November.

The Strategic Transport Plan finalised in 2015 included the extension of the line to Baipayl in Savar Upazila. But at the same time the Northern Route of MRT Line 5 is supposed to be extended to the same place, so next year the STP was revised and its extension destination was changed to Ashulia instead of Baipayl. In the first week of May in 2023, M.A.N. Siddique announced a plan to build another part of the line in the north-west through Ashulia and Baipayl to Nabinagar. But the decision to extend the line to Savar in 2024 was scrapped for the under-construction Dhaka–Ashulia Elevated Expressway. On 1 October 2024, the Savar Citizens' Committee staged a human chain appealing to the government to positively reconsider the extension of the line to Nabinagar.

== Timeline ==
The following dates represent the dates the section opened to the public, not the private inauguration.

Phase	Phase date	Terminals		Length
Phase 1	29 December 2022	Uttara North	Agargaon	11.73 km (7.29 mi)
Phase 2	5 November 2023	Agargaon	Motijheel	8.37 km (5.20 mi)
Phase 3	1 January 2027	Motijheel	Kamalapur	1.16 km (0.72 mi)
Phase 4	TBA	Uttara North	Tongi	7.5 km (4.7 mi)
Total		Tongi	Kamalapur	28.76 km (17.87 mi)

== Financing ==
Share of financing of the MRT Line 6
1. JICA (58.8%)
2. Government (41.2%)

In terms of construction cost with Kamalapur extension, it is the most expensive mass rapid transit line in Asia before the North–South MRT line of Singapore. ৳21985 crore (equivalent to ৳270 billion or US$2.2 billion in 2024) was used for the construction of the first and second phase. JICA provided 75.45% of it as a loan. The government agreed to accept the loan for interest rates of 0.70% for construction, 0.01% for consultancy service, and 0.2% for Front End Fee. As per the terms of the agreement, the loan will not be repaid for the first ten years of the line's operation. The entire amount of the loan is stipulated to be repaid within thirty years of commencement.

For the extension of the line up to Kamalapur and line-related projects, the project budget has increased by ৳11514 crore (equivalent to ৳140 billion or US$1.1 billion in 2024) to ৳32985 crore (equivalent to ৳400 billion or US$3.3 billion in 2024). In 2022, JICA provided more ৳1358 crore (equivalent to ৳16 billion or US$130 million in 2024) for the extension project. In the next year, the World Bank agreed to give loan of ৳1600 crore (equivalent to ৳19 billion or US$160 million in 2024) for Integrated Corridors Management project for stations in Mirpur and Tejgaon Thana. JICA announced to provide total of ৳3081.11 crore (equivalent to ৳37 billion or US$300 million in 2024) loan for the extension project to Kamalapur.

According to the managing director of DMTCL, the company needs to earn ৳3 crore (equivalent to ৳3.6 crore or US$300,000 in 2024) daily from its ticket sales to meet the cost of MRT Line 6. It will take up from 2024 to 2069 to repay the loan taken for the construction of MRT Line 6 from ticket sales if the maximum passenger capacity is carried. On the opening day, it earned ৳274872 (US$2,200). It earned ৳88 lakh (equivalent to ৳1.1 crore or US$87,000 in 2024) in 10 days of activity. In the first month, the company earned ৳2.45 crore (US$200,000) from the line. In the first three months of the operation, DMTCL earned a total of ৳6.20 crore (US$510,000) from MRT Line 6, though its total expenditure was ৳7.33 crore (US$600,000). On 19 June 2023, DMTCL paid ৳55.30 crore (US$4.5 million) to the government towards repayment of debt. According to the information provided in July 2023, the company earned ৳0.25 million daily from this line. According to the information given in January 2024, the daily income from the line is ৳15 million. In September of the same year, the income fell to an average of ৳11.4 million per day. As of 2023–2024, DMTCL earned ৳2.44 billion but faced loss of ৳520 million. According to 2025 data, MRT Line 6 requires ৳60 million per month for electricity.

== Stations ==
There may be changes to the planned stations, including new stations getting added, existing planned stations getting eliminated or assigned different names.

Code	Name		Connections	Location	Opened
Code	English	Bengali	Connections	Location	Opened
1	Tongi	টঙ্গী	Bangladesh Railway	Tongi	Planned
2	Tongi Bazar	টঙ্গী বাজার	Dhaka BRT	Tongi	Planned
3	Sonargaon Janapath East	সোনারগাঁও জনপথ পূর্ব	Dhaka BRT	Uttara	Planned
4	Sonargaon Janapath West	সোনারগাঁও জনপথ পশ্চিম		Uttara	Planned
5	Diabari Bazar	দিয়াবাড়ি বাজার		Uttara	Planned
6	Uttara North	উত্তরা উত্তর	BRTC Shuttle Bus	Uttara	29 December 2022
7	Uttara Center	উত্তরা সেন্টার		Uttara	18 February 2023
8	Uttara South	উত্তরা দক্ষিণ		Uttara	31 March 2023
9	Pallabi	পল্লবী		Pallabi	25 January 2023
10	Mirpur 11	মিরপুর ১১		Mirpur	15 March 2023
11	Mirpur 10	মিরপুর ১০	MRT Line 5N	Mirpur	1 March 2023
12	Kazipara	কাজীপাড়া		Mirpur	15 March 2023
13	Shewrapara	শেওড়াপাড়া		Mirpur	31 March 2023
14	Agargaon	আগারগাঁও	BRTC Shuttle Bus	Agargaon	29 December 2022
15	Bijoy Sarani	বিজয় সরণি		Bijoy Sarani	13 December 2023
16	Farmgate	ফার্মগেট		Farmgate	5 November 2023
17	Karwan Bazar	কাওরান বাজার	MRT Line 5S	Karwan Bazar	31 December 2023
18	Shahbag	শাহবাগ		Shahbagh	31 December 2023
19	Dhaka University	ঢাকা বিশ্ববিদ্যালয়		Shahbagh	13 December 2023
20	Bangladesh Secretariat	বাংলাদেশ সচিবালয়		Segunbagicha	5 November 2023
21	Motijheel	মতিঝিল	MRT Line 2	Motijheel	5 November 2023
22	Kamalapur	কমলাপুর	Bus station Bangladesh Railway; MRT Line 1 MRT Line 2 MRT Line 4	Motijheel	July 2027

== Infrastructure ==
=== Rolling stock ===
A train arriving at Agargaon metro station

In 2017, DMTCL ordered 24 six-car commuter trains to Kawasaki Heavy Industries for the initial part of the line with a price tag of ৳4,257.34 crores. The fleet was built and tested in Japan. Production of rail coaches started on 16 April 2019. In February 2020, A sample train arrived in Dhaka. According to the schedule, the trains produced for passenger transport were supposed to arrive in the country in 15 June of the same year. However, the first train arrived in April 2021 with all trains delivered by March 2023. The trains of the MRT Line 6 are called "green train" officially. Trains of this line is currently served by 12 six-car trains, all of which are Kawasaki commuter car sets. Each train car is 19.8m long, 2.95m wide, and 4.1m high, forming 120m long trains. The trains are powered by 1500 V DC via overhead line rail system, are air-conditioned with two air conditioning units in each coach and capable of traveling at up to 100 km/h with ability to increase and decrease 3.5 km/h speed per second. These trains have bulletproof glass windows.

=== Depot ===
MRT Line 6 depot is located at Diabari in Uttara. The depot area also has 52 structures including workshops, washing sheds and storage. The depot can accommodate 18 trains, which have to go north from Uttara North metro station through a 300 metres long workshop to reach the depot. The depot has an operation control center from where trains can be controlled by communicating with the train driver using radio antennas mounted on the line under the direction of the controller. An exhibition and information center was planned to be set up at the depot so that people could experience the metro services. It was opened on 6 September 2022.

=== Station ===
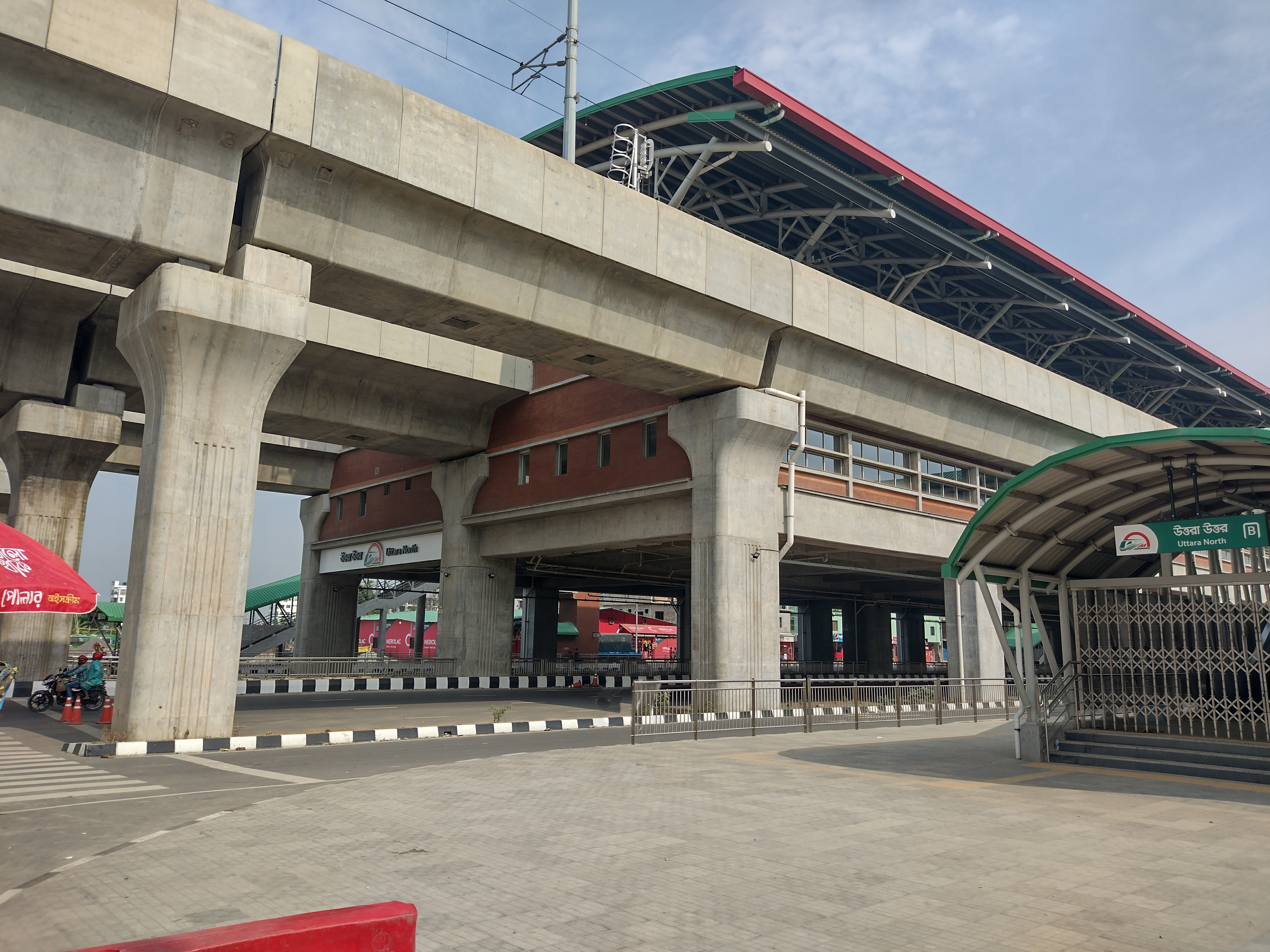
Exterior of Uttara North metro station

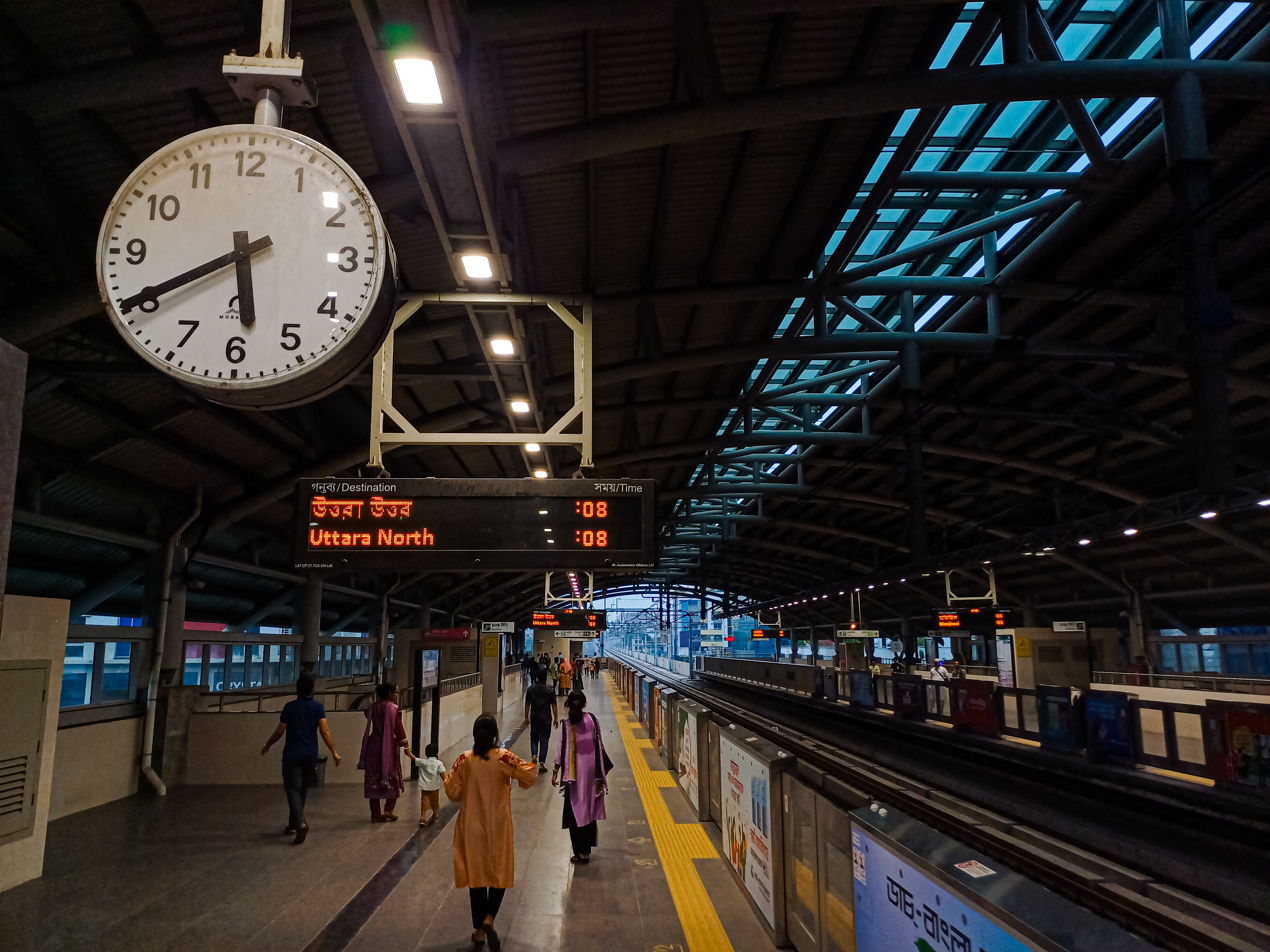
Interior of Mirpur 10 metro station

Stations of the line have a ground level and an additional two levels. Access to the first or concourse level is via stairs or elevators from the ground. It houses the station staff's office, waiting room and ticket counter. There is a system of one time ticketing from the first level. From the first level through the automatic fare collection zone, one has to take an escalator or elevator to reach the second level where the train platforms are located.

=== Features ===
To meet the cost of the line, DMTCL has planned to build a transit-oriented development (TOD) hub centered around the Uttara Center metro station. For this purpose, the authority has decided to purchase 29 acres of Uttara Model Town (3rd Phase) from Capital Development Authority at a cost of ৳866 crore. In the future, TOD hubs will be built around all the stations belonging to the line. Bangladesh Road Transport Corporation (BRTC) provides bus services to Uttara North and Agargaon metro station for the convenience of passengers to reach the station. Buses ply from Uttara North to House Building and Agargaon to Motijheel. Bus transport service from Tongi to Uttara North metro station was launched from 9 May 2024. Besides, BRTC has launched two bus services named 24 and 25 for four metro stations which stop at Agargaon, Mirpur 10, Khamarbari and Bijoy Sarani respectively. Smart delivery lockers are being installed at all stations as per the agreement of Aspire to Innovate with DMTCL. ATM booths and retail shops are planned at each station.

== Operation ==
=== Services ===
After opening, the service was initially limited to four hours a day from 8am to 12 noon, and no trains ran on Tuesday. From 25 January, the service time was set to 8:30am–12:30pm. From 5 April 2023, the line operated for 6 hours every day from 8am to 2pm until the activation of new schedule. In February 2023, DMTCL had planned to implement the new schedule from July due to the mismatch of the line's schedule with the demands of working people.

On 18 May 2023, DMTCL announced a new schedule that had been activated from 31 May: with this schedule, the line is to operate every day except Friday, with a peak hour service at 10 minute intervals from 8 am to 11 am and from 3 pm to 6 pm, and an off-peak service at 15 minute intervals from 11 am to 3 pm and from 6 pm to 8 pm. It was made effective from the date DMTCL announced.

In 4 June, the company announced that the off-peak hour headway would be reduced by 3 minutes from the following day. The authority announced on 20 June 2023 that they changed peak hour to 8 am to 11 am and 4.01 pm to 8 pm with 10 minutes headway and off-peak to 11.01 am to 4 pm with 15 minutes headway that would be activated after two days. From 8 July 2023, it was decided to extend the service by another thirty minutes from 8 am to 8.30 pm with the last thirty minutes reserved only for passengers using Rapid Pass and MRT Pass.

As per the plan, operational time will be changed from 7 am to 11.30 pm after the second phase. At first, even if the entire line is opened, except for certain trains, the rest will go up to Agargaon. After the inauguration of the second phase, it was decided to keep the train running at the newly launched Farmgate, Bangladesh Secretariat and Motijheel Metro Station from 7:30 am to 11:30 pm for a total of 4 hours. However, from 6 November 2023, the authorities have conditionally relaxed this rule in the case of trains going from Motijheel to Uttara after 11.30 am. From 8 November 2023, two special trains have been launched to run from Uttara to Motijheel at 7.10 am and 7.20 am considering the students and employees.

On 12 November 2023, the authority allocated four trains from Motijheel to Uttara from 11.40 am to 12.12 pm for MRT and Rapid Pass users. From 20 January 2024, all stations have been opened from 7:00 am to 8:40 pm, maintaining a headway of 10 minutes during peak hours and 12 minutes during off-peak hours. Off-peak hours period was fixed from 11.30 am to 4.00 pm. In 2024, the authorities were thinking of reducing the headway due to the increasing number of passengers. On 17 February 2024, the headway during peak hours was reduced by two minutes. On 27 March 2024, the operational time was extended by one hour. Headway was increased to 15 minutes from 30 May 2024. On 19 June 2024, the metro authority made the headway 10 minutes during peak hours and 8 minutes during off-peak hours. Also, peak hours from 7.31 am to 11.36 am and 2.25 pm to 8.32 pm are implemented from this day. According to the new decision, from 20 September 2024, the metro service starts from 3 pm to operational time on Fridays too. The headway for Fridays was fixed to 12 minutes. In February 2025, the authorities announced that they were considering providing metro services on Friday mornings starting in May of the same year. On 16 October 2025, the authority announced new schedule, increasing services by total sixty minutes without Friday, which would be effective after three days.

The minimum ticket price of metro rail for Line 6 is fixed at ৳20 and the fare is fixed at ৳5 per km. 12 trains have been allotted for this line, of which 2 trains are kept as backup trains. Sub-stations with 132 kV circuits have been set up at Motijheel, Uttara and Shewrapara for uninterrupted power supply to the line. Currently five coaches are in use on this line. Dhaka Metro Rail has reserved an entire compartment only for women on each train. Additionally, for security purposes, two police officers are present in each coach of the train.

=== Ridership ===
On the opening day, it was used by 3857 passengers. There were 90 thousand passengers in 10 days of activity. In January, 350,000 passengers used its service. From January to March, its total ridership was 1.077 million. According to the data provided in July 2023, the line carries around 70,000 passengers regularly. As of August 2023, the number of daily passengers on this line has increased by another 10,000. After the inauguration of the second phase in November 2023, the number of users of the line stands at least 0.1 million daily. By 2024, the number of passengers using the line has almost doubled. In March 2024, the ridership increased to 275,000 daily. At the end of the month the number reached at 0.29 million. During the 2024 Bangladesh quota reform movement, the road blockade in July resulted in a daily ridership of 360,000, 20% more than regular commuters. According to a DMTCL study, the daily ridership of the line would be 483,000 in 2024. On 14 February 2025, it was announced that MRT Line 6 was being used by 400,000 passengers daily. According to a 2025 DMTCL survey, Mirpur 10 metro station was used the most (17.8 million) and Uttara south metro station was used the least (1.2 million) by passengers.

=== Incidents ===
On the first day of operation, the ticket vending machines at the station became unusable, causing passengers to have problems getting tickets. The authority attributed the problem to the failure of the vending machine because the machines did not have enough money to dispense high-value banknotes. After two days the authority succeeded in solving the problem. Also, on 1 January 2023, metro service was suspended for two hours in the morning after New Year's Eve because a string of sky lanterns fell onto the line's overhead wire. After two hours its operation was resumed. DMTCL lost a revenue of ৳3,15,370 due to stoppage of trains for two hours during that time. On 19 February this year, the down line of the MRT Line 6 was temporarily suspended due to a kite getting stuck. Then again six days later, metro services were temporarily suspended due to the same reason.

On 30 April 2023, a rock was thrown at a window of a train bound for Uttara North metro station around Kazipara metro station. Although no one was injured or the window was broken, the window glass was cracked. After the incident, the DMTCL filed a complaint against the unidentified miscreants at the nearby Kafrul Thana. Later, a case was registered against the unidentified persons under the Metrorail Act, 2015 and the police started an investigation to identify them. In the case document, DMTCL stated that the vandalism caused a loss of ৳10 lakh to the company. Police investigation identified 7-8 possible buildings from which the rock could have been hurled. On the other hand, from the video footage, the metro authority identified the building from where the stone was hurled. On 6 May, the managing director of DMTCL claimed that most of the people in the building had fled their apartments. But he also said that they will be captured. Following the incident, the Detective Branch began monitoring the buildings around the line. Besides, several rules and restrictions have been issued for access to the roofs of tall buildings. The police officers of the police station of Kafrul identified 5 people as suspects in a two-month investigation, but due to lack of evidence, they could not identify the culprits and arrest them.

On 23 July 2023, a man was traveling from Pallabi metro station to Uttara North metro station when he saw a passenger in the train asking other passengers for alms. He recorded the video of the beggar and uploaded it on Facebook which went viral. As soon as they reached Uttara, he complained to the authorities and the beggar was arrested. On 7 August 2023, the first train left at 8:40 AM instead of 8 AM due to technical issues. Two days later, metro services on the line were suspended for two and a half hours due to an electrical fault. Then on 21st of the same month at around 8.30 am a train was stuck on the line for more than an hour due to an emergency brake which stopped the operation for that time. On 5 November 2023, the operational activities of Motijheel metro station was disrupted due to a technical fault in the automatic ticketing machines.

After the implementation of the new schedule on 20 January 2024, the Motijheel metro station witnessed chaos due to pressure from more passengers. On 23 January 2024, a downed wire on the metro cable towards Karwan Bazar was the reason the authorities had to stop operations for 15 minutes due to caution. On 4 February 2024, the metro service was suspended for about two hours due to a voltage drop on the overhead line on the Pallabi section. On 14 February 2024, train service from Motijheel to Uttara North was stopped for an hour after a kite got entangled in an overhead cable at Kazipara. Police arrested two people in this incident. Three days later, metro services were halted for over an hour due to a technical problem with the automatic doors of the stations. It was later revealed that the incident happened when a passenger stuck a water bottle on an automatic door to stop the train at a station. On 19 March 2024, metro services were suspended for 45 minutes due to a rush of passengers at the Bangladesh Secretariat metro station causing the platform's automatic doors to jam.

On 31 March 2024, metro services had to be suspended due to the threat posed by the storm. On the same day, a piece of polythene flew in the air and stuck to the overhead line, forcing metro services to be suspended again to remove it. Due to these reasons, the service on the line was stopped for about two hours on that day. On 25 May 2024, metro services were suspended for around 1 hour at evening due to electrical connection problems which resulted signaling system malfunction. On 27 May 2024, schedule disruption happened for 2 hours in the morning for unknown reasons and train transport was stopped on the Karwan Bazar to Motijheel section for 2 hours in the afternoon due to Cyclone Remal blowing tree branches and a solar panel on the line. On 30 May 2024, metro services were suspended for thirty minutes in the morning due to a technical fault. On 7 July 2024, metro service was suspended for 23 minutes due to power outage.

During the 2024 Bangladesh quota reform movement, on 11 July, Armed Police Battalion were deployed at Shahbag, Dhaka University and Bangladesh Secretariat metro stations and the metro station at Shahbag was shut down. In 16 July, after members of the ruling Awami League's student body Chhatra League beat up activists of the quota reform movement at the paid zone of Farmgate metro station, members of the Armed Police Battalion were deployed at that station as well. In 18 July, 4 stations were closed at noon as clashes between police and protesters escalated in Mirpur. After that the operation of Line 6 was declared closed due to security reasons at afternoon. The next day, a group of miscreants attacked Mirpur 10 and Kazipara stations and damaged them and looted the goods of the stations. In 23 July, the metro authorities filed a case for damaging two metro stations. The attack is said to have caused a loss of ৳50 crore to the two stations.

Minister Obaidul Quader said in 27 July that it would take more than a year to make the two stations operational. On the same day, prime minister Sheikh Hasina asked Japanese Ambassador Iwama Kiminori for the help of the government of Japan in restoring the two stations. The following day, the detective branch of the Dhaka Metropolitan Police arrested four people. Two of the accused are members of the student wing Chhatra Dal of Bangladesh Nationalist Party (BNP). Besides, BNP chairperson's advisor Zahir Uddin Swapan, Bangladesh Jamaat-e-Islami working council member Samiul Haque Faruqi, student leader Nurul Haq Nur and BNP supporter justice A. K. M. Asaduzzaman's son Mohammad Mahmudus Salehin, who were arrested as an accused in the case, was granted remand. In 30 July, The Daily Ittefaq reported that the two affected stations would not receive compensation from the General Insurance Corporation as they were not insured by the metro rail authority. Operation continued on 25 August 2024 excluding Mirpur 10 and Kazipara station. Later, 47 accused in the case were released and Kazipara was reopened in 20 September and Mirpur 10 was reopened in 15 October of the same year.

On 18 September 2024, a viaduct's pad on the line displaced, causing a section of the line to stop operating. Later, after 11 hours, the operation was resumed when the responsible contractor installed new pad. As of October 2024, the ticket crisis caused by passengers not returning nearly 200,000 single-journey tickets to the stations resulted in passengers having to wait for long periods of time to purchase tickets at stations. So the authorities set up a deposit box in front of each station to return the tickets taken. On 26 October 2025, a bearing pad installed on the viaduct on the Farmgate section of the line came loose and fell on a man on the sidewalk, killing him. As a result, services were suspended for a limited period. On the morning of 21 November 2025, the MRT Police recovered two unexploded molotov cocktails from the track of the line. On the same day, after a magnitude 5.5 earthquake occurred in the country, authorities began monitoring the condition of the line. At that time, the operation had not started yet. After operating a trial run following the earthquake, regular services began on schedule. It was later learned that cracks had appeared in six stations. However, according to Muhammad Fouzul Kabir Khan, adviser to the Road Transport and Bridges, the cracks in the stations were "not so serious".

== Issues ==
=== Construction ===
Before the construction work started in 2016, the residents along the route were suffering due to the digging of the road to lay underground electrical cables for the construction in Mirpur. Although people suffered during construction, the use of safety barriers reduced the suffering. As of 2020, no action was taken to connect the stations with the neighbourhoods of Dhaka by constructing streets yet which could cause increase of traffic jams.

On 29 June 2021, Dhaka North Mayor Atiqul Islam alleged that DMTCL was given a condition to coordinate with the Dhaka North City Corporation to carry out the construction work, but as they violated the condition, people faced problems during the construction of two stations in Kazipara and Shewrapara. Due to the construction work, the usable roads and streets became narrow. As a result, pedestrians and vehicular movement became difficult and the route became more dangerous.

According to a report published by the private research organization Save the Road on 21 August 2022, mismanagement and inefficiency in the construction of the MRT Line 6 resulted in a loss of ৳2,140.12 crores in addition to 11,860 working hours being lost. In addition, 3,562 people fell ill due to environmental pollution and 54 patients died as they could not get medical treatment by ambulance as soon as possible caused by the construction work on the roads and streets. According to a news article published by Bangla Tribune, the owners of shopping malls situated along the route of MRT Line 6 suffered losses due to the ongoing construction work in Mirpur area.

The line was built on 13-meter-high pillars. But outside of the country, metro lines are built at a height of more than 15 meters. As the line is lower than 15 meters except for the section at Farmgate, it is impossible to construct any flyover or megastructure on its route. The extension project of Moghbazar-Mouchak Flyover was declared terminated for the same reason. The decision to build the line at a height of 13 meters was criticized by experts.

Metro station construction sites lacked sufficient space, so there was no other option but to use pavement space to build escalators. So experts suggested land acquisition for setting up escalators. According to them, the use of sidewalk space for the installation of escalators would increase the traffic jams on the streets. DMTCL had a dispute with Dhaka North City Corporation authority in 2022 due to a lack of space for the MRT Line 6 station's landings and use of pavement space. Atiqul Islam called on the builders to refrain from constructing landings on the footpath as it will be difficult for pedestrians to walk.

ফুটপাত আট ফুট চওড়া আর সিঁড়ি সাত ফুট। ফুটপাত এক ফুটের হয়ে গেলে যাত্রী স্টেশনে যাবেন কী করে? পথচারী চলবে কোন দিক দিয়ে?

The sidewalk is eight feet wide and the stairs are seven feet. If the footpath becomes one foot, how will the passenger go to the station? In which direction will the pedestrian walk?

— Atiqul Islam, When he came to see the work of the Mirpur 10 metro station

Atiqul Islam criticized the arrangement saying that DMTCL did not acquire the land before construction for the landings and used the footpath space, saying that it should be ensured that people do not suffer due to the construction of stations. As a result, DMTCL announced the acquisition of land for the landing space of stations. This announcement added some complexity to the construction project. Besides, during the construction, the pillars of the project was placed on the drains of different areas of the city corporation, causing the city corporation authority to face difficulties in various tasks. According to a news article reported by New Age in October 2022, construction of entry and exit points for Pallabi, Mirpur 11 and Shewrapara stations had become challenging due to reluctance of residents of the greater Mirpur area to sell plot.

All the pillars of MRT Line 6 are built on the road median except a pillar of its portal frame at Farmgate, placed in the middle of the road to the left of the median, making the road accident-prone and increasing traffic jams on the road. According to the DMTCL authority, this happened because the contractors of the Dhaka Elevated Expressway project did not work in coordination with them during the construction work at Farmgate.

As part of the Kamalapur extension project, DMTCL planned to construct a metro station, loop line for scissor crossing and a yard of 300 meters length at Kamalapur. The intention behind the plan to construct a yard and loop Line in the area was to facilitate metro service on MRT Line 6. In a meeting with Bangladesh Railway in 2020, it was decided that the loop line will be constructed at a distance from the station area. But going beyond the decision, DMTCL conducted a survey for construction of yard and loop line in the station area. On 14 March 2024, the Ministry of Railways warned DMTCL for conducting the survey without permission from the appropriate authorities due to opposition from Bangladesh Railway.

Anwara Begum was shot dead by the police during the 1969 East Pakistan mass uprising. Later people named the field at Farmgate as Anwara Garden in her memory which was popularly known as Anwara Field. Then it was transformed into a park named Shahid Anwara park. It was the only park in the area. In 2018, DMTCL took permission from the Ministry of Housing and Public Works to use the park as a site office and equipment storage area for MRT Line 6. The park was supposed to be handed over to the ministry after construction, but the metro authorities applied to hand over the ownership of the park for the construction of the station plaza. On 25 October 2023, the residents protested against this decision. Dhaka North City Corporation Mayor Atiqul Islam and Home Minister Asaduzzaman Khan supported the movement. At that time the Home Minister had promised to make efforts to restore the park to its previous condition, but due to no progress in that regard, the agitators demanded on 18 May 2024 that the authorities concerned with the park should return the Anwara park within 30 days. On 13 June 2024, M.A.N. Siddique stated that it would not be possible to release the park site to the authorities until the third phase of MRT Line 6 was completed. He also said that the station plaza would be built at Farmgate while keeping the park. In April 2025, Muhammad Fouzul Kabir Khan, ministerial head for Road Transport and Bridges, assured that a part of the park would be vacated by DMTCL before June.

As of transportation experts, its stations are not disability friendly due to absence of multimodal integration system.

During construction, the line's risk assessment was not given due importance. Although its consulting firm NKDM Associates was supposed to be responsible for its supervision, they have been accused of failing to properly carry out their duties.

=== Others ===
In 2013, the Odhikar Unnoyon Songstha reported that the government had illegally appointed Nippon Koei as the consultant in violation of existing rules. Based on the report, JICA warned the government about this, but the government was adamant about its decision. In a meeting held next year, Obaidul Quader expressed his fear and said that if there is any corruption in the Metrorail project, he would have no other option but to leave the ministry. The DTCA authority in the meeting then assured the minister that there is no scope for corruption as there are various parties including JICA as reviewers in the consultant recruitment process. In 2023, Syed Imran Saleh Prince, Acting and Organizing Secretary of the Central Office of BNP, claimed that there has been unlimited corruption and irregularities in the construction of MRT Line 6.

The Association of Mobile Telecom Operators of Bangladesh (AMTOB) conducted a technical survey and evaluation of nine metro stations. Based on that survey, they requested DMTCL on 27 September 2022 for permission to install antennas to maintain an uninterrupted mobile network in station buildings along with prepared plans. However, the managing director of DMTCL said it was impossible due to technical and architectural reasons and advised the mobile operators to install antennas in the adjacent areas of the route. In response, the mobile operators said that for legal reasons, they are not allowed to do so on the roofs of residential buildings and government buildings and it is not their responsibility to install towers.

Experts criticized the decision to open the entire line from Uttara to Agargaon in 2022. According to passengers and experts, instead of opening the entire line, opening half of the line will increase rather than reduce the suffering of the people.

The maintenance of public toilets at stations on MRT Line 6 has been leased by DMTCL to Boisakhi Security Services Limited who charge passengers ৳10 to use the toilets. This decision was criticized by passengers. They are also seeing it as "unnecessary expanse" as they have to pay for the fare with it. The authorities responded the issue by saying the additional expanse for public toilet as "service cost".

In 2024, there were reports of passengers failing to board the train as the headway became 10–12 minutes and the train quickly filled up. DMTCL's lack of manpower has been blamed for this. Besides, due to overshooting and undershooting issues, passengers face the problem of getting on and off the train frequently. The technology provider of MRT Line 6 and the metro authority decided to work together to solve the problem.

It is reported that various temporary illegal shops and hawkers occupy in front of the landing part of the stations making it difficult for passengers to enter the stations from the landing.

According to the safety protocol of the line, its operator DMTCL is required to obtain a safety certificate from the Dhaka Transport Coordination Authority and arrange insurance for the line as per the law, which the company has not done. According to DMTCL officials, these could not be done due to political pressure.

== Impact ==
During the construction of MRT Line 6, the area around the three metro stations located in Uttara Model Town began to increase in population. The metro facility under construction has the potential to increase connectivity in the Uttara Model Town Phase 3 sectors as housing developers invested a total of ৳50,000 crore in Uttara and Mirpur areas. Due to the construction of MRT Line 6, new buildings are being built in the new sectors developed in Uttara. Besides, various commercial establishments and factories started to develop in the Greater Mirpur area centered on the Metro Rail. Due to the densely populated area of Mirpur, people were less interested in living there due to severe traffic congestion on the streets there. But after the operational activities of MRT Line 6, the demand for apartment rentals in that area has increased.

After the opening of the first phase of MRT Line 6, people traveling from Uttara to Agargaon started using Metro Rail and this led to an increase in the number of passengers using Metro services who used to travel by bus earlier. This has alarmed bus service officials, who fear that bus ridership may drop significantly after the second phase is launched. Therefore, according to the bus transport owners, the management and quality control of bus service has become necessary here to maintain the number of bus transport users serving the route of MRT Line 6. According to a survey conducted by Bangladesh University of Engineering and Technology from 17 July to 14 September 2023, 59.41% of passengers using MRT Line 6 used bus transport services in the past.

According to a report published by Banglanews24.com, after the inauguration of the second phase on 5 November 2023, traffic congestion has reduced in Motijheel, Farmgate and Bijoy Sarani. After the implementation of the new operational period in 2024, the number of private cars on the MRT Line 6 route was relatively low. The opening of all stations on MRT Line 6 has significantly reduced revenue of the ridesharing companies due to lack of passengers on its routes. The bus transport companies have faced financial loss as the number of passengers of the buses has decreased significantly after the second phase of the route was fully operational from Agargaon to Motijheel. However, demand for cycle rickshaws increases as passengers need vehicles to reach the station. In 2022, vehicles used to travel 4.8 kilometers per hour on the route of MRT Line 6. According to the government, as traffic congestion eases after the launch of the line, vehicles can travel 10 kilometers per hour in 2024.

According to Center for Atmospheric Pollution Studies (CAPS) of Stamford University, the 14-day average air quality in January 2024 increased by 12.35% compared to 2023, even though the factors responsible for air pollution in Dhaka remained unchanged. According to CAPS, MRT Line 6 is the reason behind this. According to Poribesh Bachao Andolon, the city's air pollution may be lower than previous years due to the same reason.

== Legacy ==
- In 2019, the entrance to the Dhaka International Trade Fair was modeled after a viaduct of MRT Line 6, which included a replica of the Dhaka Metro train.
- International news agency BNN Bloomberg wrote about the inauguration of the first phase "While the project is likely to bring significant changes to how people travel in Dhaka, its inauguration will also give some much-needed political mileage to Hasina's government. With elections expected in January 2024, the leader and her party are under pressure as the South Asian nation's foreign currency reserves dwindle and it battles inflation and energy crises". The Bangladeshi daily Amar Desh reported that the then-government had prioritized Line 6 among the proposed metro lines for political advantage and hastily inaugurated it in two phases ahead of the 2024 General election.
- On the day of the inauguration of MRT Line 6, Bangladesh Bank released a commemorative ৳50 banknote with a portrait of a metro train traveling on the line on one side.
- Bangladesh Post Office released a commemorative postal stamp on the day of inauguration.
- A song has been released to mark the launch of the line. The song is composed by Kishore Das and sung by Momtaz Begum.
- On the occasion of Saraswati Puja in 2023, a replica of MRT Line 6 train has been made in a school field in Akhaura.
