= Motijheel metro station =

Metro station in Dhaka

Motijheel মতিঝিল
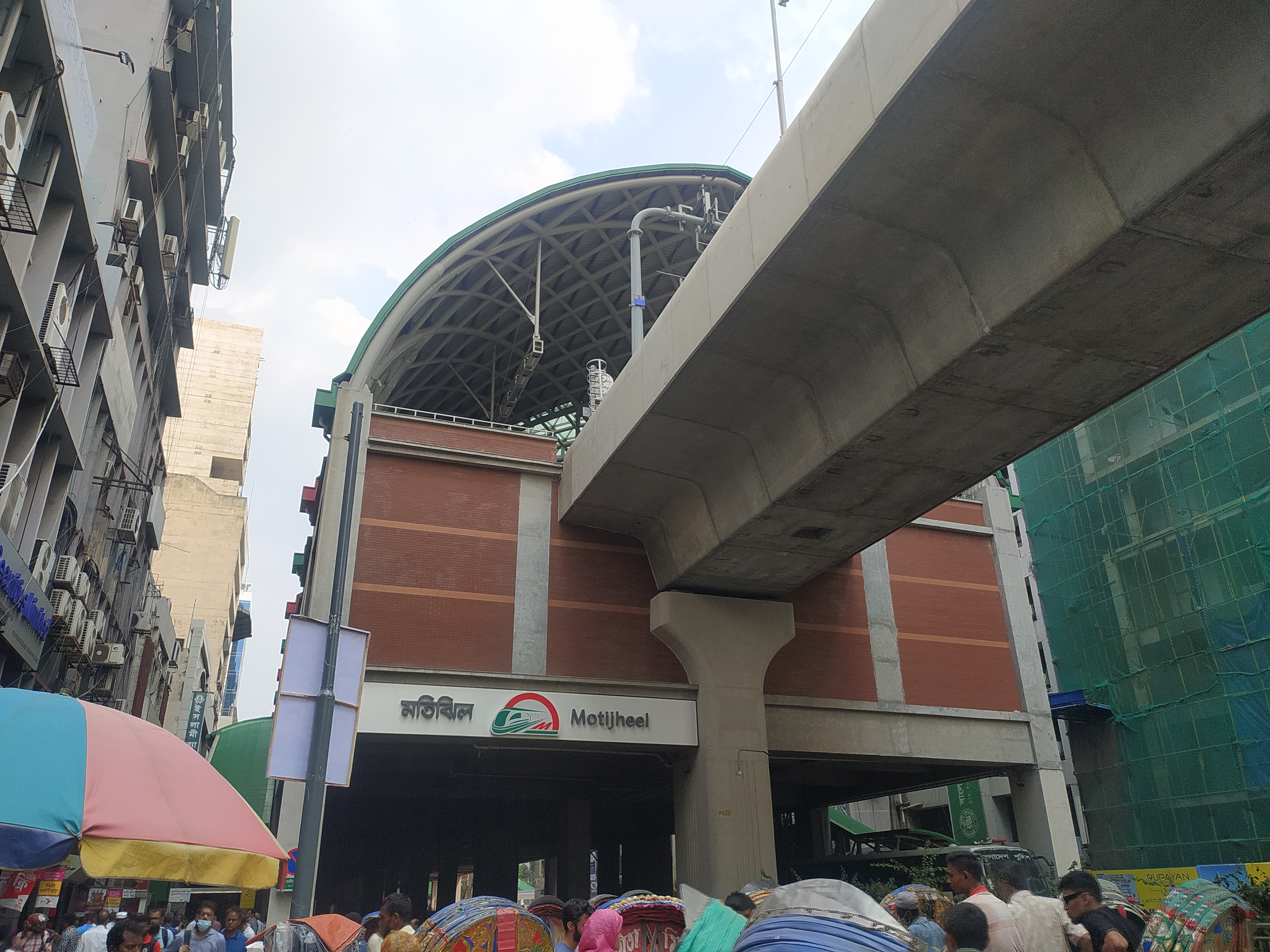

General information
- Other names: Station 16
- Location: Motijheel Road, Dilkusha, Dhaka; Bangladesh
- Coordinates: 23.7280611°N 90.4190611°E
- System: Dhaka Metro Rail station
- Owner: Dhaka Mass Transit Company Limited
- Lines: MRT Line 2 MRT Line 6
- Platforms: Side platform
- Tracks: 2
- Bus operators: BRTC
- Connections: Bus stand

Construction
- Structure type: Elevated
- Platform levels: 3
- Parking: No
- Cycle facilities: No
- Accessible: Yes

History
- Opened: 5 November 2023
- Electrified: 1,500 V DC overhead catenary

Services
Preceding station	Dhaka Metro	Following station
Dilkusha Road towards Gabtoli	MRT Line 2	Arambagh towards Narayanganj
Bangladesh Secretariat towards Uttara North	MRT Line 6	Kamalapur Terminus
Route map
- Source
Location

Motijheel (Bengali: মতিঝিল, romanised: Motijhil) is an elevated metro station of the Dhaka Metro Rail's MRT Line 6. This station is located in the area of Dilkusha towards Motijheel. It commenced operations on 5 November 2023.

== History ==
The station was constructed under "Package CP-03". The notification of application for construction of raised bridges for stations and railways was published on 30 June 2015 and the last date for submission of applications was 9 September 2015. The Italian-Thai Development Public Company Limited received the work contract for "Package CP-03". The agreement was signed in a ceremony on 3 May 2017, and construction work started on 2 August 2017.

In 2019, the extension of MRT Line 6 from Motijheel to Kamalapur was planned by the government. As of December 2022, the construction of the station was in progress and the installation of the roof sheet of the station was in progress. The extension work started in January 2023.

== Station ==
=== Station layout ===
G	Path level	Exit / Entry
L1	Between	Rent control, station agent, metro card vending machine, crossover
L2	Side platform no. 1, the left door will open
L2	Southbound	towards → Kamalapur
L2	Northbound	→towards ←Bangladesh Secretariat←
L2	Side platform no. 2, the left door will open
L2
