= Dhaka University metro station =

Metro station in Dhaka

Dhaka University ঢাকা বিশ্ববিদ্যালয়
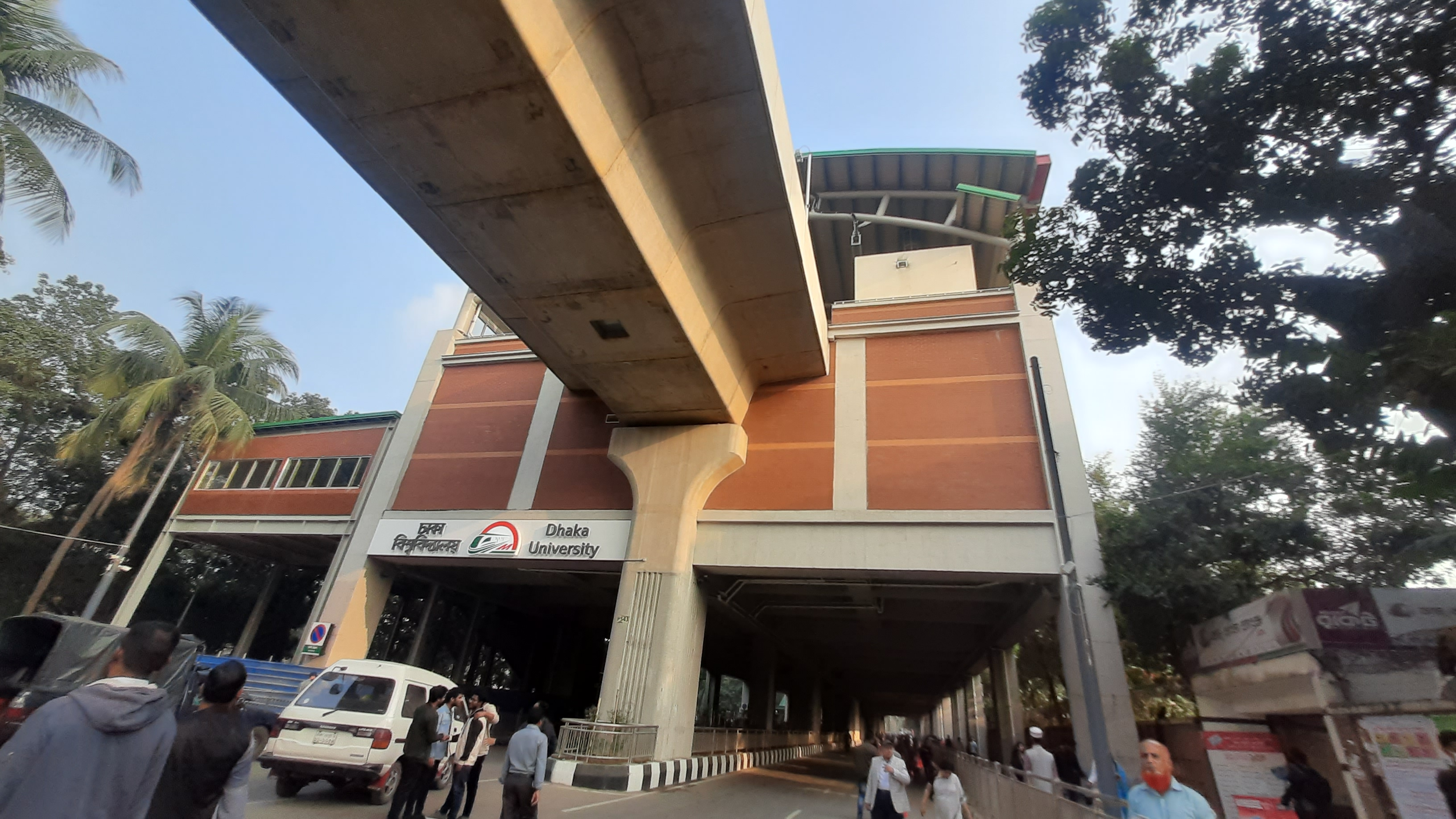
- Station building

General information
- Other names: Station 14
- Location: Secretariat Road, Teacher-Student Centre, University of Dhaka, Shahbagh Thana, Dhaka; Bangladesh
- Coordinates: 23.7319226°N 90.3964633°E
- System: Dhaka Metro Rail station
- Owner: Dhaka Mass Transit Company Limited
- Line: MRT Line 6
- Platforms: Side platform
- Tracks: 2
- Bus operators: BRTC
- Connections: University of Dhaka

Construction
- Structure type: Elevated
- Platform levels: 3
- Parking: No
- Cycle facilities: No
- Accessible: Yes

History
- Opened: 13 December 2023
- Electrified: 1,500 V DC overhead catenary

Services
Preceding station	Dhaka Metro	Following station
Shahbagh towards Uttara North	MRT Line 6	Bangladesh Secretariat towards Kamalapur
Route map
- Source
Location

Dhaka University (Bengali: ঢাকা বিশ্ববিদ্যালয়, romanised: Dhaka Bisshobiddaloy), also sometimes unofficially and colloquially referred to as TSC station, is an elevated metro station on MRT Line 6 of the Dhaka Metro Rail. This station is in the University of Dhaka campus, next to the Teacher-Student Centre and close to the Curzon Hall, located in Shahbagh Thana. The station commenced service on 13 December 2023.

== History ==
On 28 December 2014, the conceptual design of MRT Line 6 was created. After determining the route of the line by the side of Shaheed Minar, it was planned to change the route in the face of objection and take it in front of the Teacher-Student Centre, University of Dhaka. In protest of this, the students of Dhaka University conducted various programs on 7 January 2016. On the other hand, Road Transport and Bridges Minister Obaidul Quader ruled out the possibility of moving the metro route from Dhaka University as the construction work would start in two months. He informed that there will be no problem in the activities of the university as sound insulation technology will be used on the metro rail line. Meetings are held with students to resolve disputes. After discussing the benefits of a metro station in the Dhaka University area, they withdrew their opposition.

The station was constructed under "Package CP-03". The notification of application for construction of raised bridges for stations and railways was published on 30 June 2015 and the last date for submission of applications was 9 September 2015. The Italian-Thai Development Public Company Limited received the "Package CP-03" work contract. The agreement was signed in a ceremony on 3 May 2017. Construction of the station began on 1 July 2020.

The station was initially scheduled to commence operations on 2 December 2023, but it was delayed to 7 December. Finally, the station began its operation on the 13th of the same month.

On 2 December 2023, the students of DU celebrated by hosting an event in the campus area and by wearing cultural attires, playing and singing cultural Bangladeshi songs and holding banners as a sign to show gratitude to Prime Minister Sheikh Hasina.

== Station ==
=== Station layout ===
G	Path level	Exit / Entry
L1	Between	Rent control, station agent, metro card vending machine, crossover
L2	Side platform no. 1, the left door will open
L2	Southbound	towards → Bangladesh Secretariat
L2	Northbound	→towards ←Shahbagh←
L2	Side platform no. 2, the left door will open
L2
