= Diabari Depot =

Dhaka Metro Rail depot on the MRT Line 6

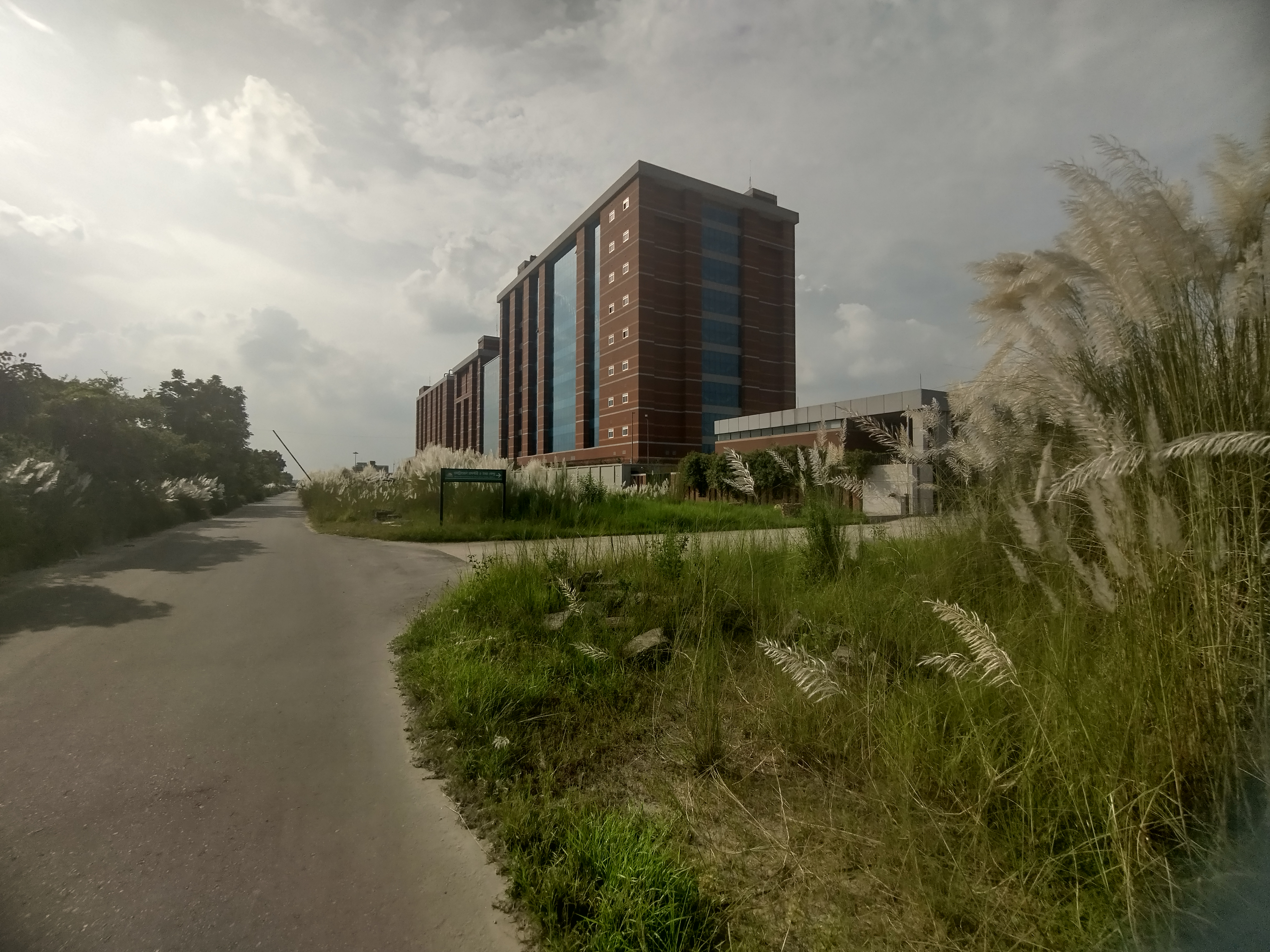
- Entrance of the depot area
- Interactive map of Diabari Depot

Location
- Location: Diabari, Dhaka, Bangladesh
- Coordinates: 23.8780112°N 90.3558237°E

Characteristics
- Owner: Road Transport and Highways Division
- Operator: Dhaka Mass Transit Company Limited
- Type: At-Grade
- Roads: Sonargaon Janapath, Mirpur Road
- Rolling stock: Kawasaki Railcar Manufacturing
- Routes served: MRT Line 6

History
- Opened: June 2022

Diabari Depot (Bengali: দিয়াবাড়ি ডিপো), officially Uttara Depot (Bengali: উত্তরা ডিপো), is a railway depot of the Dhaka Metro Rail's MRT Line 6, located before Uttara North station in northern Dhaka. It is the first depot on the metro lines of Dhaka, having been built in 2022, when the MRT Line 6 was under construction.

== History ==
On 27 March 2016, Dhaka Mass Transit Company Limited (DMTCL) signed an agreement with Tokyu Construction Ltd for the development of a depot of the MRT Line 6. The depot is planned to be built on 59 acres of land in the third phase of the Uttara Satellite Town project. As the 30 acres of the depot area is soft, the 8 adjacent buildings were at risk from the tremors generated during construction of the depot structure using sand conception piling, which the Japan International Cooperation Agency (JICA) promised to compensate if damaged. In September 2016, works related to the construction of the line's depot at Diabari were started. Construction of the structures of the depot was entrusted to Italian-Thai Development and Sinohydro in 2017. Construction of the structures of the depot began on 13 September 2017. Land development work of the depot was completed on 31 January 2018. The administrative building at the depot was complete in 2021. Depots' construction was complete in June 2022.

== Layout ==
The depot area has 52 structures including workshops, washing sheds and storage. The depot can accommodate 18 trains, which have to go north from Uttara North metro station through a 300 metres long workshop to reach the depot. The depot has an operation control center from where trains can be controlled by communicating with the train driver using radio antennas mounted on the line under the direction of the controller. The depot area has been greened by planting trees.

== Metro Rail Exhibition and Information Center ==
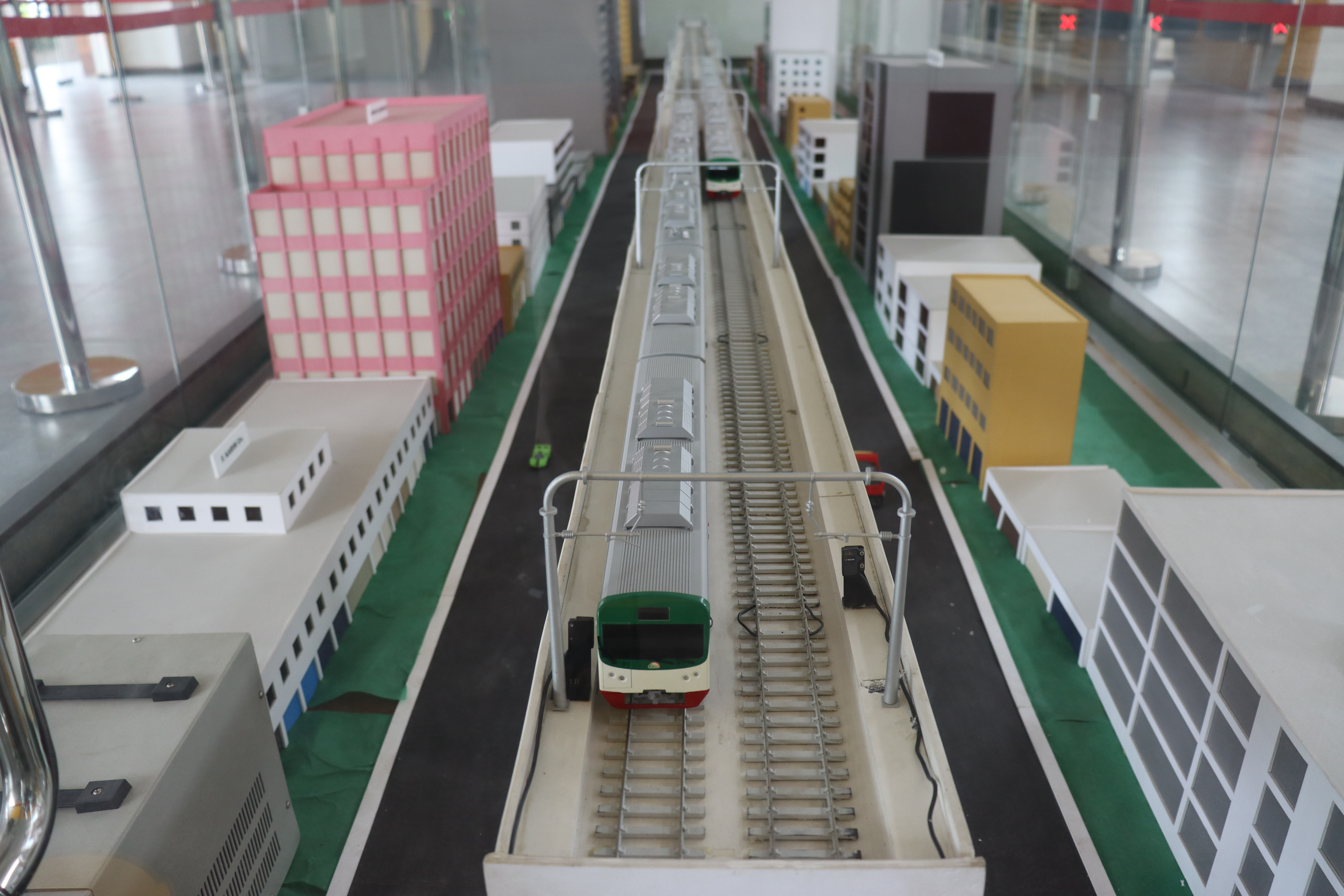
A model of Dhaka Metro's train sets at Metro Rail Exhibition and Information Center

It was known that an exhibition and information center was designed by JICA to be set up so that people could experience the metro services. Its main purpose was to preserve the memory of died Japanese officials worked for the MRT Line 6 during July 2016 Dhaka attack. By September 2019, DMTCL chose the site for the proposed center beside the depot entrance. In February 2020, A sample train for the center arrived in Dhaka. It was supposed to open in March 2020. Later the date was changed to January 2022. On 24 July 2022, a memorial plaque placed on the center in memory of seven Japanese official of MRT Line 6 construction project died in July 2016 Dhaka attack was inaugurated by Road Transport and Bridge minister Obaidul Quader. In August 2022, it was reported that the Metro Rail Exhibition and Information Centre may be opened for public in September 2022. Then it was opened on 6 September 2022.

== Controversy ==
On 1 March 2024, DMTCL invited tenders for the appointment of operators to run the 7,580 square feet staff canteen at the depot. In March, the company issued a tender notice to Khandkar Enterprises for an annual rent of ৳12,000. The news of the tender issue drew criticism. However, according to M.A.N. Siddique, DMTCL Managing Director, as no interested contractor was found in September 2023, the finalized contractor has been appointed in charge of the canteen at a lower price in this year's open tender. Later, when a writ was filed in the High Court challenging the validity of this decision, ABM Amin Ullah Nuri, the concerned senior secretary, was directed to submit the inquiry report to the court within one month. The inquiry report submitted in June noted that the staff canteen is non-commercial and its fare is justified considering its customers.

== In popular culture ==
In 2021, during COVID-19 pandemic, an episode of Bangladeshi variety television show Ityadi was filmed at the depot, which is its first audience-free episode.
