= Karwan Bazar metro station =

Metro station in Dhaka

Karwan Bazar কারওয়ান বাজার
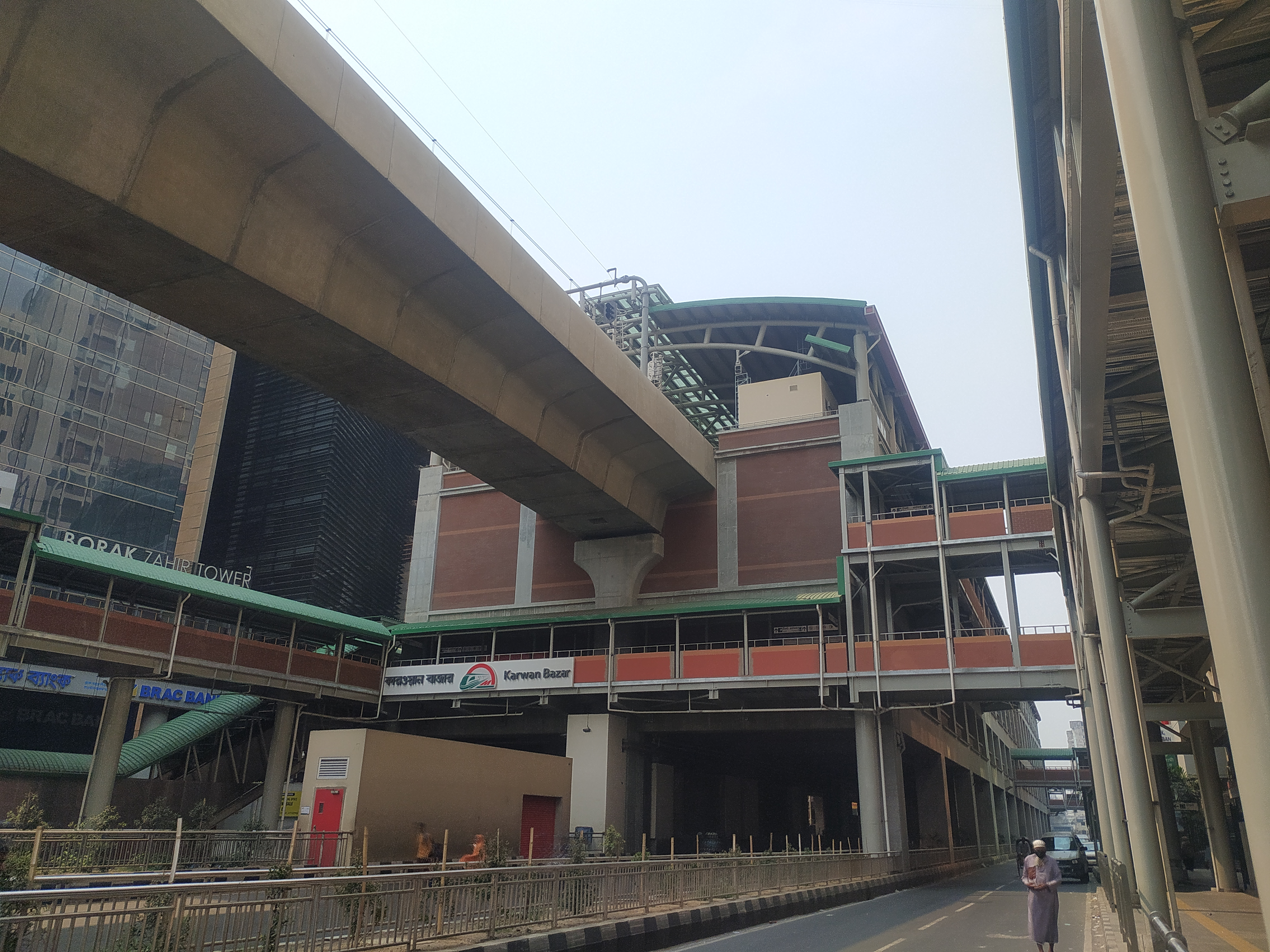
- Station building

General information
- Other names: Station 12
- Location: Kawran Bazar, Dhaka; Bangladesh
- Coordinates: 23.7513°N 90.3927°E
- System: Dhaka Metro Rail station
- Owner: Dhaka Mass Transit Company Limited
- Operator: DMTCL
- Lines: MRT Line 5S; MRT Line 6
- Platforms: Side platform
- Tracks: 2
- Bus operators: BRTC

Construction
- Structure type: Elevated
- Platform levels: 3
- Parking: No
- Cycle facilities: No
- Accessible: Yes

History
- Opened: 31 December 2023
- Electrified: 1,500 V DC overhead catenary

Passengers
- ~1 Million

Services
Preceding station	Dhaka Metro	Following station
Russel Square towards Gabtoli	MRT Line 5S	Hatirjheel towards Dasherkandi
Farmgate towards Uttara North	MRT Line 6	Shahbagh towards Kamalapur
Route map
- Source
Location

Karwan Bazar (Bengali: কারওয়ান বাজার, romanised: Karoan Bajar) is an elevated metro station of the Dhaka Metro's MRT Line 6. This station is located in the area of Kawran Bazar, and was opened from the 31 December 2023.
