= Bangladesh Secretariat metro station =

Metro station in Dhaka

Bangladesh Secretariat বাংলাদেশ সচিবালয়
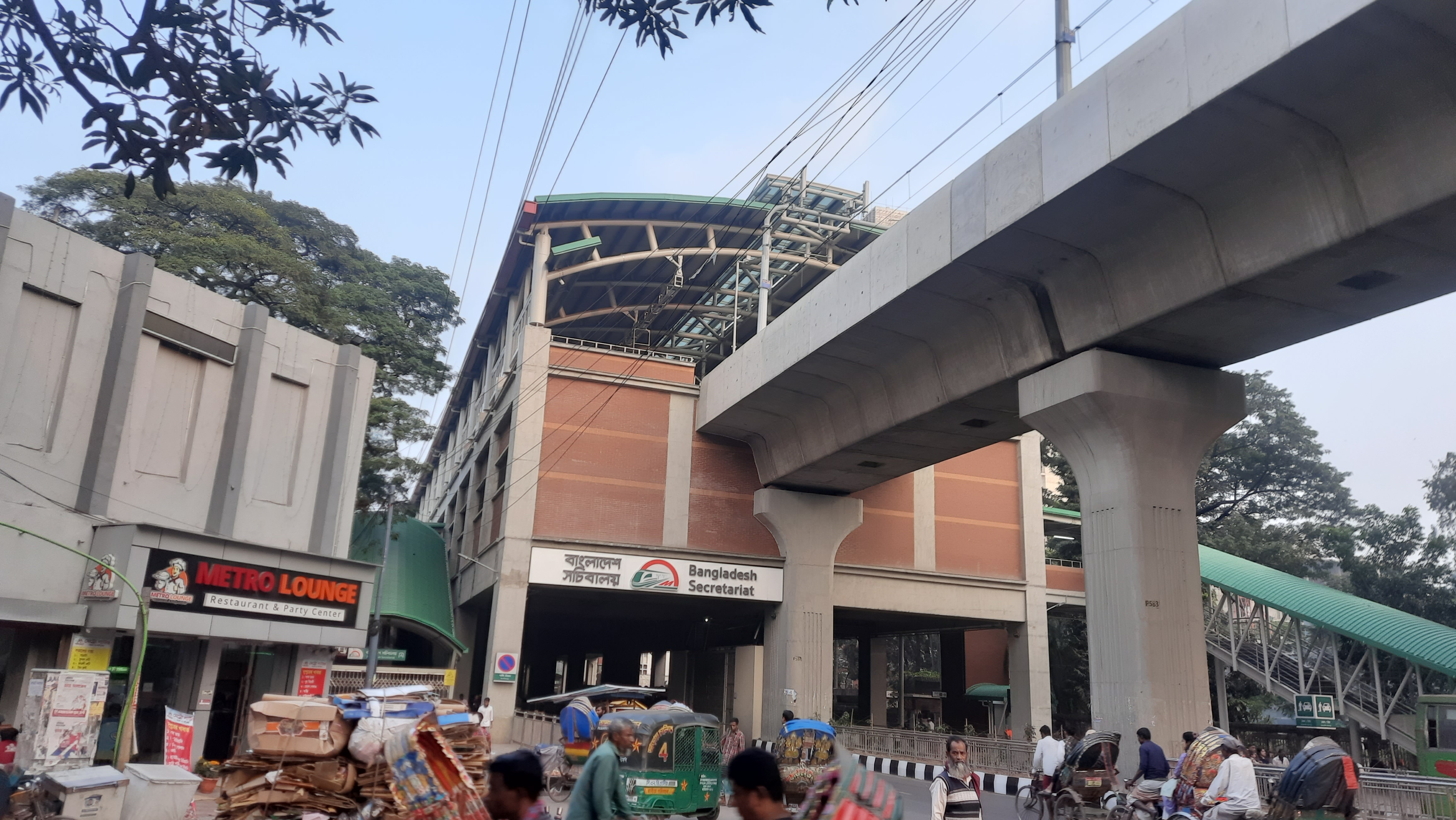
- Bangladesh Secretariat metro station at Segunbagicha

General information
- Other names: Station 15
- Location: Segunbagicha, Dhaka; Bangladesh
- Coordinates: 23.7300°N 90.4075°E
- System: Dhaka Metro Rail station
- Owner: Dhaka Mass Transit Company Limited
- Line: MRT Line 6
- Platforms: Side platform
- Tracks: 2

Construction
- Structure type: Elevated
- Platform levels: 3
- Parking: No
- Cycle facilities: No
- Accessible: Yes

History
- Opened: 5 November 2023
- Electrified: 1,500 V DC overhead catenary

Services
Preceding station	Dhaka Metro	Following station
Dhaka University towards Uttara North	MRT Line 6	Motijheel towards Kamalapur
Route map
- Source
Location

Bangladesh Secretariat (Bengali: বাংলাদেশ সচিবালয়, romanised: Bangladesh Shochibaloy) is an elevated metro station of Dhaka Metro Rail's MRT Line 6, in Bangladesh. It is located in the neighbourhood of Segunbagicha, near Bangladesh Secretariat and Ministry of Foreign Affairs. The station began its operation on 5 November 2023.
