= M. A. N. Siddique =

Bangladeshi civil servant

M.A.N. Siddique
- এম এ এন ছিদ্দিক
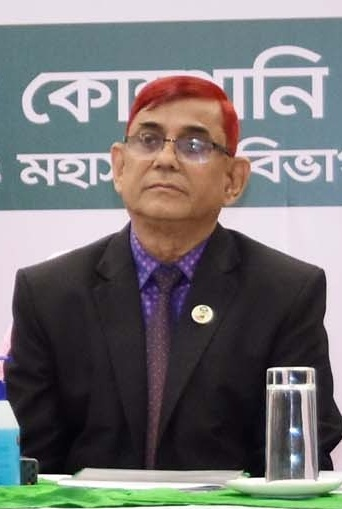
- Siddique in 2021

Dhaka Mass Transit Company Limited

Managing Director
- In office 26 October 2017 – 9 September 2024
- Appointed by: Obaidul Quader
- Preceded by: Position created
- Succeeded by: Faruque Ahmed

Road Transport and Highways Division

Senior Secretary
- In office 16 November 2011 – 11 October 2017
- Minister: Obaidul Quader
- Preceded by: Md Mozammel Haque Khan
- Succeeded by: Md. Nazrul Islam

Personal details
- Born: Muhammad Abu Nur Siddique; 13 October 1957 (age 68) Dacca District, East Pakistan, Pakistan
- Education: University of Dhaka; University of Birmingham
- Occupation: Government official

M. A. N. Siddique is a former officer of the Bangladesh Civil Service who served as the first Managing Director of Dhaka Mass Transit Company Limited. He was also the Secretary of the Road Transport and Highways Division.

== Early life ==
Siddique was born on 13 October 1957 in Narsingdi Thana, Narayanganj Subdivision, Dacca District, East Pakistan, Pakistan (present-day Narsingdi District, Bangladesh). He studied German at the Institute of Modern Languages, and earned bachelor's and master's degrees in economics from the University of Dhaka, a master's degree in social sciences and a post-graduate diploma in local government management from the University of Birmingham.

== Career ==
Siddique joined the 1982 special batch of the Bangladesh Civil Service as a public administration cadre. He served as the administrator of Sherpur District and commissioner of Chittagong Division. On 16 November 2011, he was appointed as the acting secretary of the Road Transport and Highways Division. In 2013, he was promoted from acting secretary to secretary. He was scheduled to retire on 12 October 2016. But on 10 October 2016, the government appointed him as the secretary of the Roads Division on a contract for another year. He was replaced by Md. Nazrul Islam as the secretary of the Roads Division by a notification issued on 12 October 2017. On 26 October of the same year, Siddique joined Dhaka Mass Transit Company Limited (DMTCL) as the managing director. At that time, the construction progress of the MRT Line 6 project undertaken by the company was 1%. During his tenure as managing director, its construction was completed and Line 6 became the first operational metro line in the country. On 9 September 2024, a notification was issued, terminating his contractual appointment and appointing Mohammad Abdur Rauf as the company's managing director.

== Litigation ==
On 29 October 2024, a murder case was filed against Siddique by Mohammad Zaman Hossain Khan, a politician of Bangladesh Nationalist Party (BNP), over the death of a protestor in the July massacre.

On 12 October 2025, the Anti-Corruption Commission (ACC) filed a case against Siddique and a total of 17 individuals on charges of embezzlement and irregularities in the toll collection process of the Meghna-Gumti bridge. On 21 December 2025, following an application by the ACC, the court imposed a emigration ban on him.

== Controversies ==
According to one source, in order to claim personal credit, Siddique had instructed the rapid completion of the construction of MRT Line 6 without adequately verifying quality. Munima Sultana of The Financial Express called Siddique the "monarch of the Dhaka Metro Rail" and reported that he was appointed as the managing director without any specific tenure and was to remain in the post indefinitely until the termination of the contractual appointment in September 2024. According to the DMTCL's articles of association, the managing director must have a degree in civil or mechanical engineering and 25 years of relevant work experience. However, after joining the post, Siddique legitimized his appointment by amending the articles of association to specify a retired secretary as the qualification for the managing director. He is accused of appointing people of his choice instead of appointing qualified people to 27 positions in DMTCL. Although he was required to attend the meetings of the Dhaka Transport Coordination Authority, he did not do so. In a meeting of the DMTCL board of directors, he cancelled the membership of professor Shamsul Haque of the Bangladesh University of Engineering and Technology (BUET), which was illegal under the Companies Act, 1994, and replaced him with professor Mizanur Rahman. According to the Daily Khaborer Kagoj, Siddique had a good relationship with Prime Minister Sheikh Hasina and would contact her directly whenever necessary, bypassing senior officials. It is alleged that he used his political influence to suppress allegations raised against him in the Road Transport and Highways Division, and senior officials refrained from taking any action on the allegations. According to a report published by Manab Zamin, there are allegations of arbitrariness against him in DMTCL and that officials were not independent in making decisions. Company officials were unhappy with Siddique's management. Although the construction of the company's administrative building at Diabari Depot was completed in 2021, he did not shift the company's office from the Prabashi Kallyan Bhaban, located 700 meters away from his official residence on Bailey Road, which cost about ৳28.3 million in rent. However, according to Siddique, there was no additional cost involved, rather the office at the Prabashi Kallyan Bhaban has played a role in saving money by coordinating the supervision and work of a small number of officers and employees of MRT Line 1, MRT Line 5 and MRT Line 6. In addition, according to the newspaper, information obtained from DMTCL sources indicates that Siddique was indirectly involved in the strike of DMTCL employees over the issue of discriminatory salary structure at a time when the Dhaka Metro Rail, which was closed due to an attack by miscreants on 19 July 2024, was likely to be launched after the resignation of Sheikh Hasina, which led to uncertainty about the launch of the metro rail.
