= Shahbag metro station =

Metro station in Dhaka

Shahbagh শাহবাগ
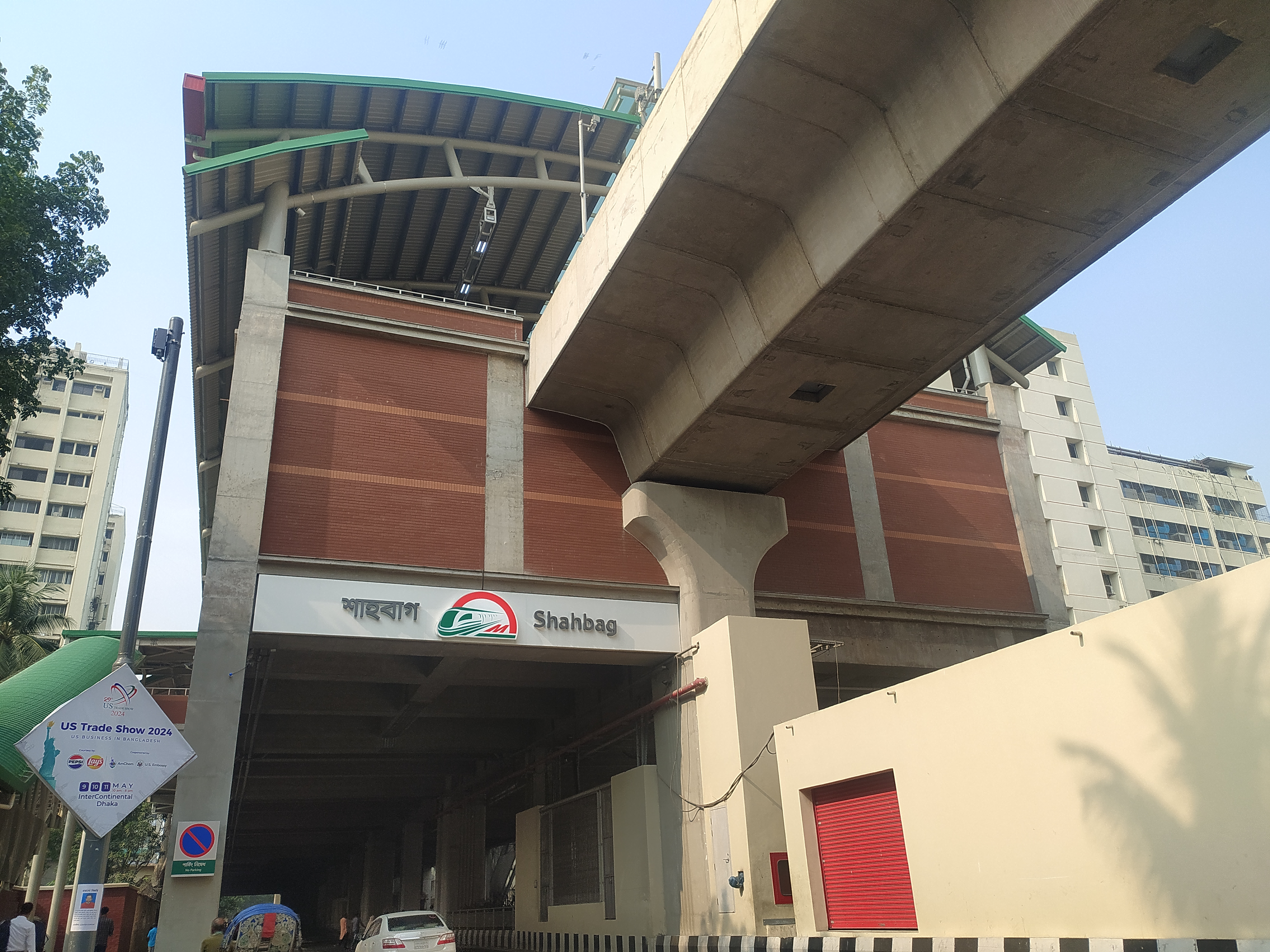
- Station building

General information
- Other names: Station 13
- Location: Shahbagh, Dhaka; Bangladesh
- Coordinates: 23.7395°N 90.3960°E
- System: Dhaka Metro Rail station
- Owner: Dhaka Mass Transit Company Limited
- Line: MRT Line 6
- Platforms: Side platform
- Tracks: 2

Construction
- Structure type: Elevated
- Platform levels: 3
- Parking: No
- Cycle facilities: No
- Accessible: Yes

History
- Opened: 31 December 2023
- Electrified: 1,500 V DC overhead catenary

Services
Preceding station	Dhaka Metro	Following station
Kawran Bazar towards Uttara North	MRT Line 6	Dhaka University towards Kamalapur
Route map
- Source
Location

Shahbag (Bengali: শাহবাগ, romanised: Shahbag) is a metro station of the Dhaka Metro's MRT Line 6 in Bangladesh. This station is located in the area and thana of Shahbagh. The station has been in service since 31 December 2023.
