= Moghbazar-Mouchak Flyover =

Flyover in Bangladesh

- Coordinates: 23.7554°N 90.3996°E
- Locale: Dhaka

Characteristics
- Total length: 8.25 km

History
- Constructed by: Simplex Navana Joyti, Metalargical Construction Overseas Company, Toma Constructions Ltd
- Construction start: 2011
- Construction end: 26 October 2017
- Construction cost: 11.35 billion taka

The Moghbazar-Mouchak Flyover is the second largest flyover in Bangladesh. Its foundation stone was laid in 2011.

A public-private partnership initiative, the flyover was partially opened on 30 March 2016 and fully opened on 26 October 2017.

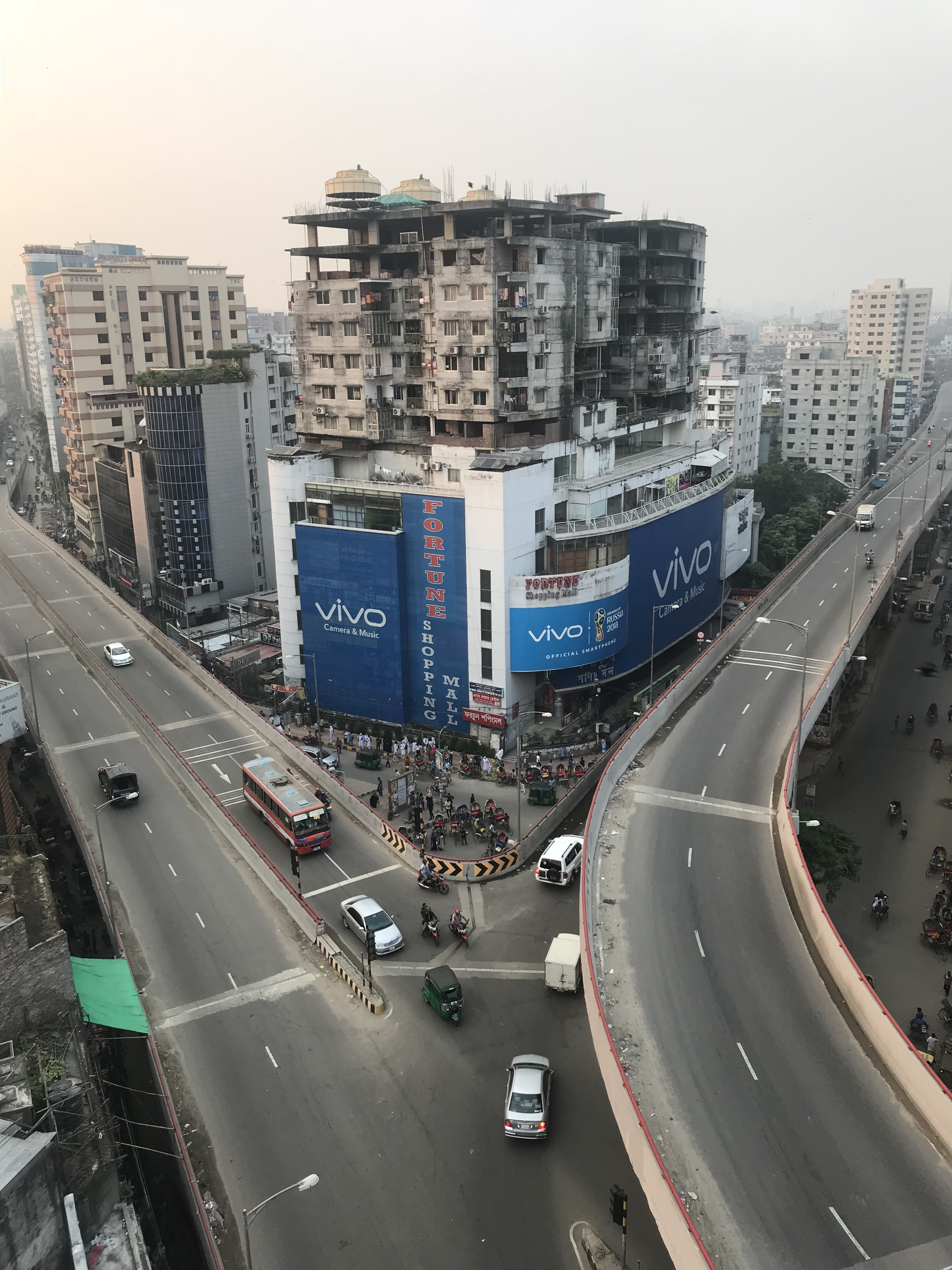
Moghbazar - Mouchak flyover near Mouchak square

== Graffiti ==
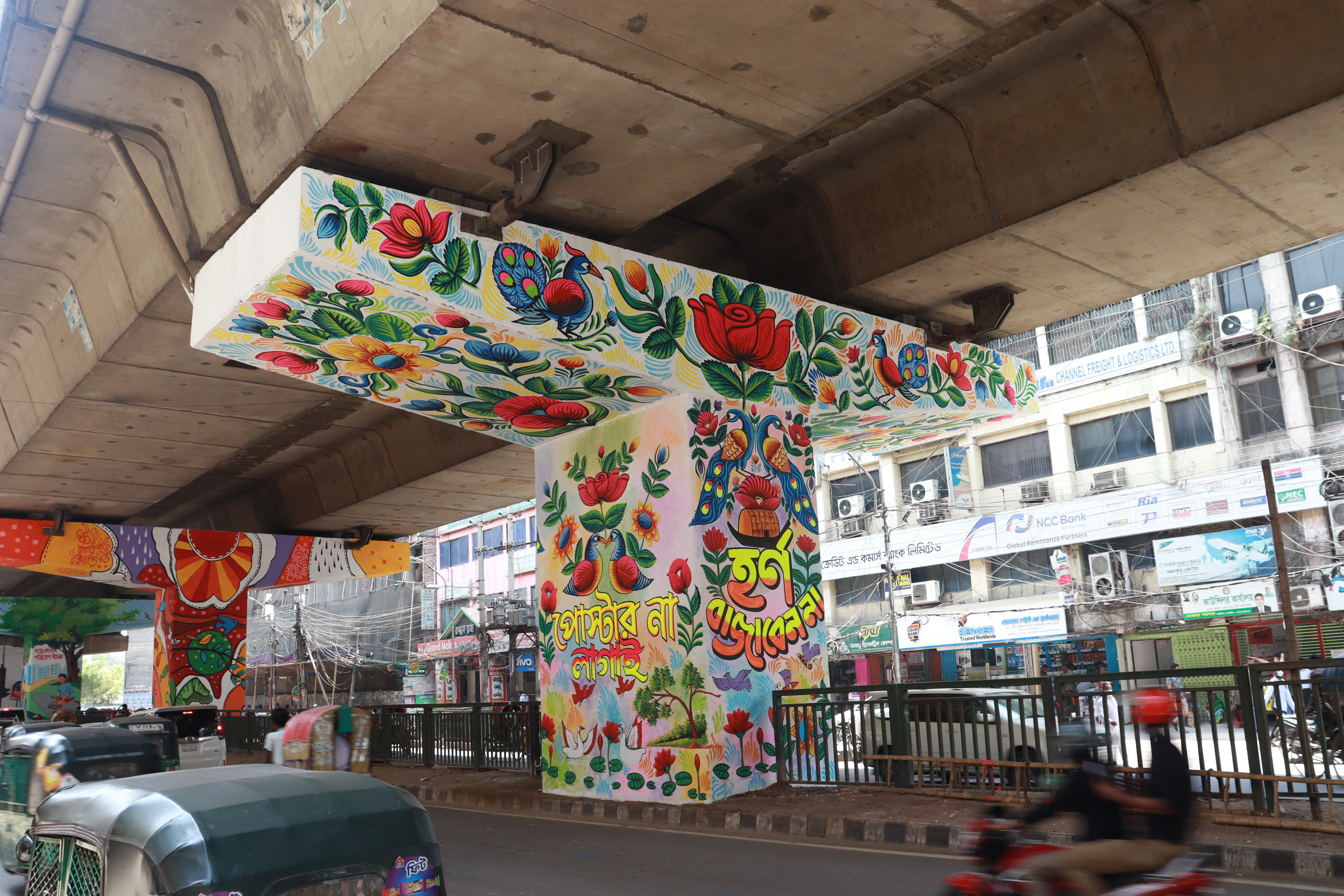
Graffiti on a pillar of the flyover

Prime Minister Sheikh Hasina ordered Atiqul Islam, the mayor of North Dhaka, to paint graffiti so that no one could put posters on the pillars of the flyover. She wanted rickshaw artists to be employed for these graffiti drawings. As of 12 April 2023, the graffiti work on the four pillars of the flyover had been completed.
