= Uttara Model Town (3rd Phase) =

Uttara Model Town, Third Phase
- Neighbourhood
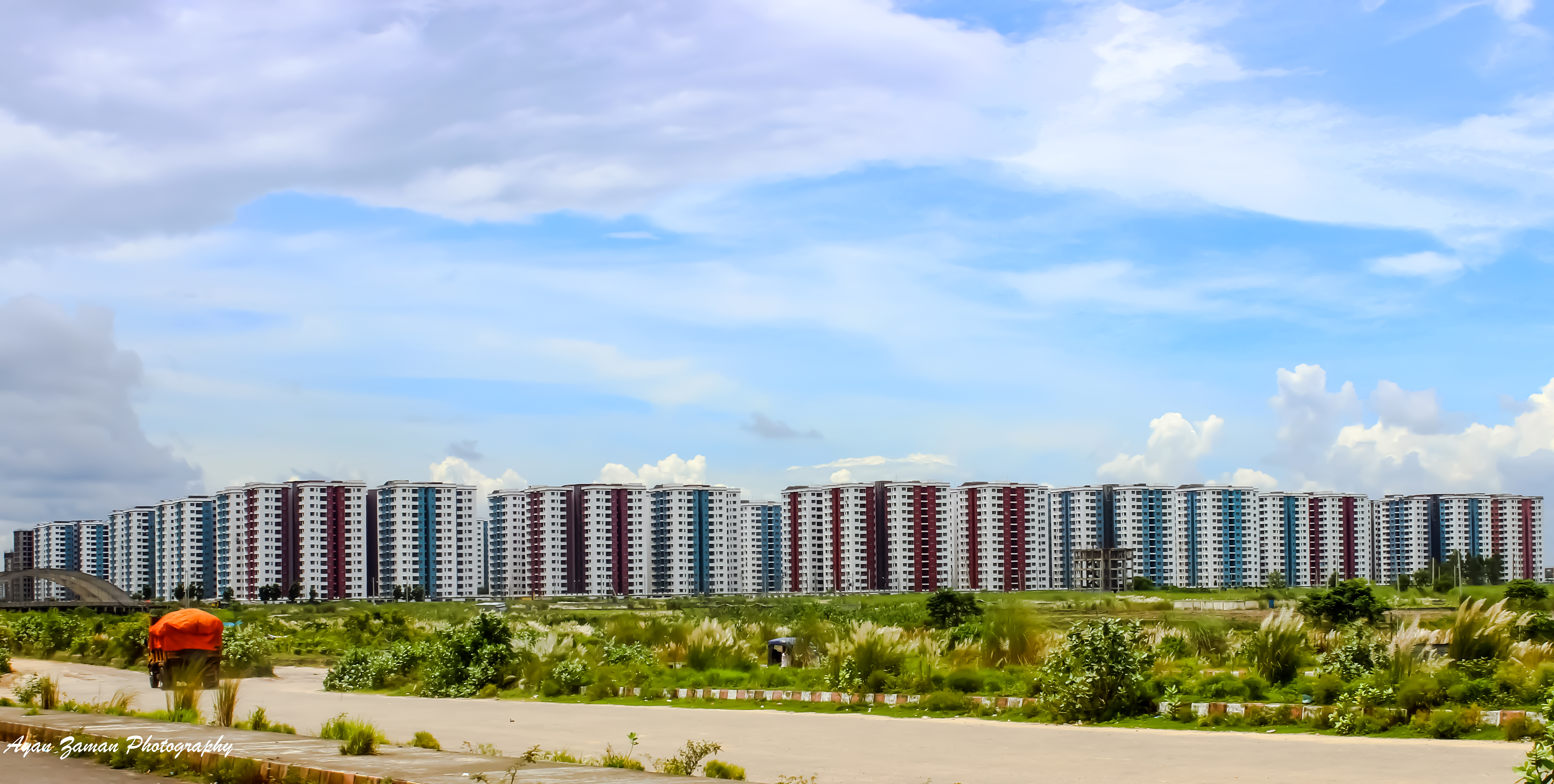
- Skyline of Sector 18, Phase 3, Uttara

- Location in Bangladesh
- Coordinates: 23°52′N 90°24.3′E
- Country: Bangladesh
- Division: Dhaka Division
- District: Dhaka District
- Established: 2010

Area
  - Total: 8.126 km^{2} (3.137 sq mi)
  - Land: 7.07 km^{2} (2.73 sq mi)
  - Water: 1.056 km^{2} (0.408 sq mi) 13%
- Time zone: UTC+6 (BST)

The 3rd Phase of Uttara Residential Model Town is an extension to the Uttara Model Town.

== Background ==
Dhaka is the capital and largest city of Bangladesh. The dwellings required to support Dhaka's large population have become inadequate. Because of this, the residential areas of Dhaka city are overpopulated and dirty.

Planned extension of the city limits is being undertaken under the Uttara Model Town Project with the objectives of accommodating the growing population and maintaining a level of service to the people. During the course of the project circa 2,150 acres (8.7 km^{2}) of land were acquired. About 10,000 residential plots and 225,512 apartments including amenities and urban facilities were provided.

The entire Uttara Thana project is being undertaken by the Rajdhani Unnayan Kartripakkha (RAJUK), the Capital Development Authority of Bangladesh.

== Location ==
The third phase of the Uttara residential model town is situated approximately 20 km (12 mi) from the zero point of Dhaka City. It is located on the western side of the Uttara model town (2nd phase) project. It is bounded on the south by the Mirpur Cantonment and west by the flood protection embankment through Mirpur-Ashulia.

== Objectives of the project ==
- Reduce the pressure of population in Dhaka city by creating suburban residential accommodation
- Maintain environmental balance by proper urbanization
- Maintain an environmentally friendly and sustainable atmosphere
- Reduce the prevailing acute shortage of residential properties
- Gradually expand civic facilities by urbanization throughout the surrounding areas
- Develop new township
- Expand existing economic facilities
- Mitigate future housing demands.

== Land use plan (major component) ==
The following land use is planned in the project:

- Residential plots – 24.01%
- Highrise apartment block – 10.68%
- Road network – 30.92%
- Physical & social infrastructure – 3.04%
- Public utility services – 2.53%
- Lake, open space & park – 13.00%
- Neighborhood/playing field – 3.02%
- Commercial plots – 5.00%
- Central business district – 0.92%
- Education & institution – 1.67%
