= Diabari =

Location in Dhaka, Bangladesh

Coordinates: 23.873923°N 90.378514°E

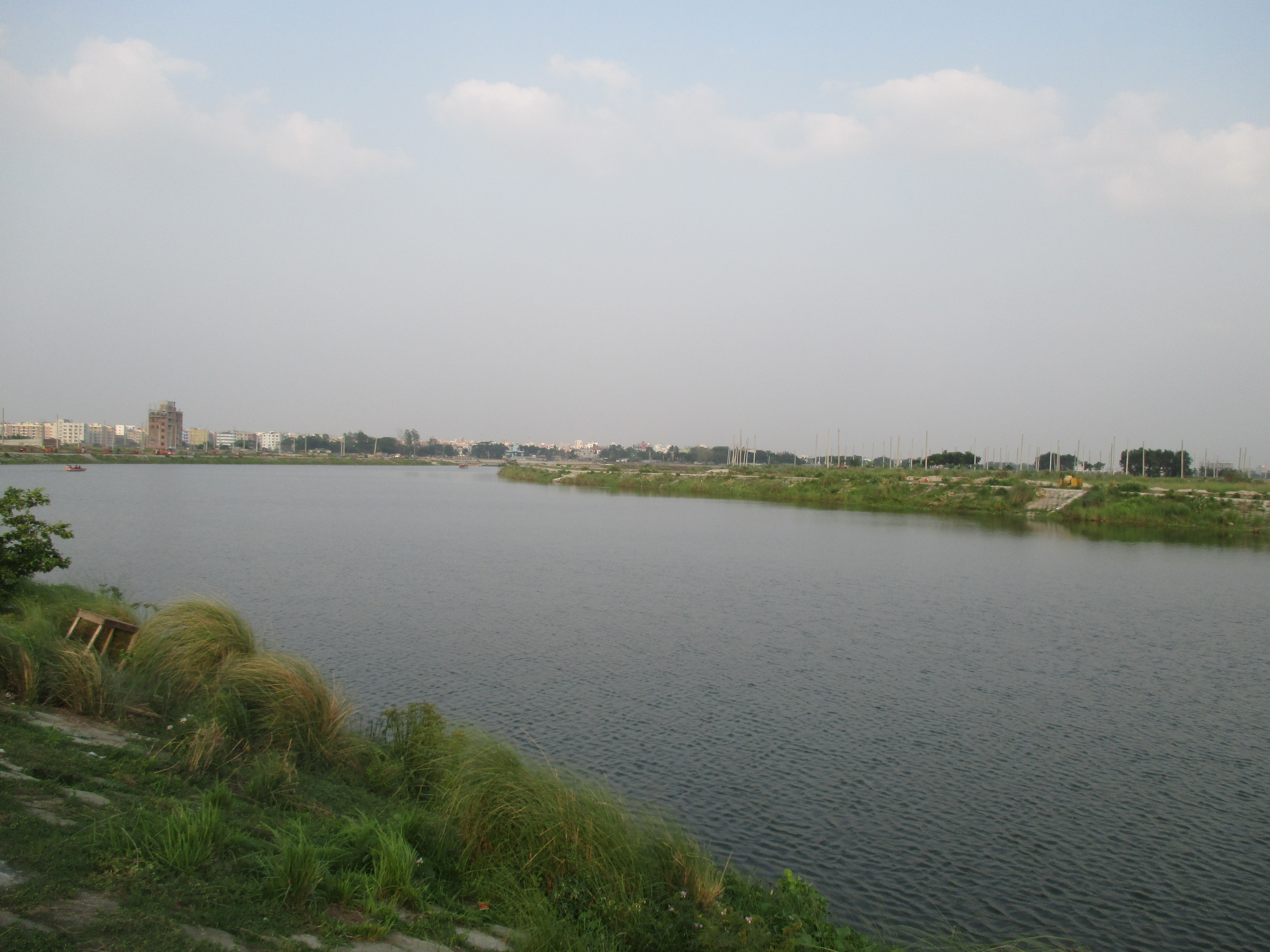
Diabari area

Diabari (Bengali: দিয়াবাড়ি) is a place situated in Uttara, Dhaka. It is a tourist attraction in Uttara. Diabari consists of plain lands of Sectors 15 and 16 in Uttara. Trains of MRT Line 6 start their journey from the Diabari area. There is a canal which is 4.34 meters long. According to RAJUK's detailed area plan, there is a plan to build a road from Diabari to Gazipur.

Although a wide variety of birds are found here, the number of birds is declining due to man-made disasters. Due to the rural environment in the city, the value of this place has increased among tourists. Tourists come here to see Kans grass. There are paddle boat arrangements for tourists. There is a children's amusement park in the area named Fantasy Island. Also there is a movie theater built by the amusement park authority named Magic theater. It is also popular for kayaking.
