= Bangladesh Road Transport Corporation =

Bangladeshi transportation agency

- বাংলাদেশ সড়ক পরিবহন কর্পোরেশন

Agency overview
- Formed: 1961; 65 years ago
- Jurisdiction: Bangladesh
- Headquarters: BRTC Building, Dhaka, Bangladesh
- Annual budget: Allocated by Government
- Agency executive: Abdul Latif Mollah, Chairman
- Parent agency: (Bangladesh) Ministry of Road Transport and Bridges
- Website: brtc.gov.bd

The Bangladesh Road Transport Corporation (BRTC) is a state-owned road and transport service organization of Bangladesh. It was established under the Government Ordinance No.7 of 1961 dated 4 February 1961. Following the independence of Bangladesh in 1971, it assumed its current name. It is responsible for issuing buses and maintaining the public transports in the roads and highway division.

== Organization ==
BRTC is a semi-autonomous corporation under the Ministry of Communication. The governing body includes the Communication Minister, the Communication Secretary, the Director of the corporation, and other officials.

== Services ==
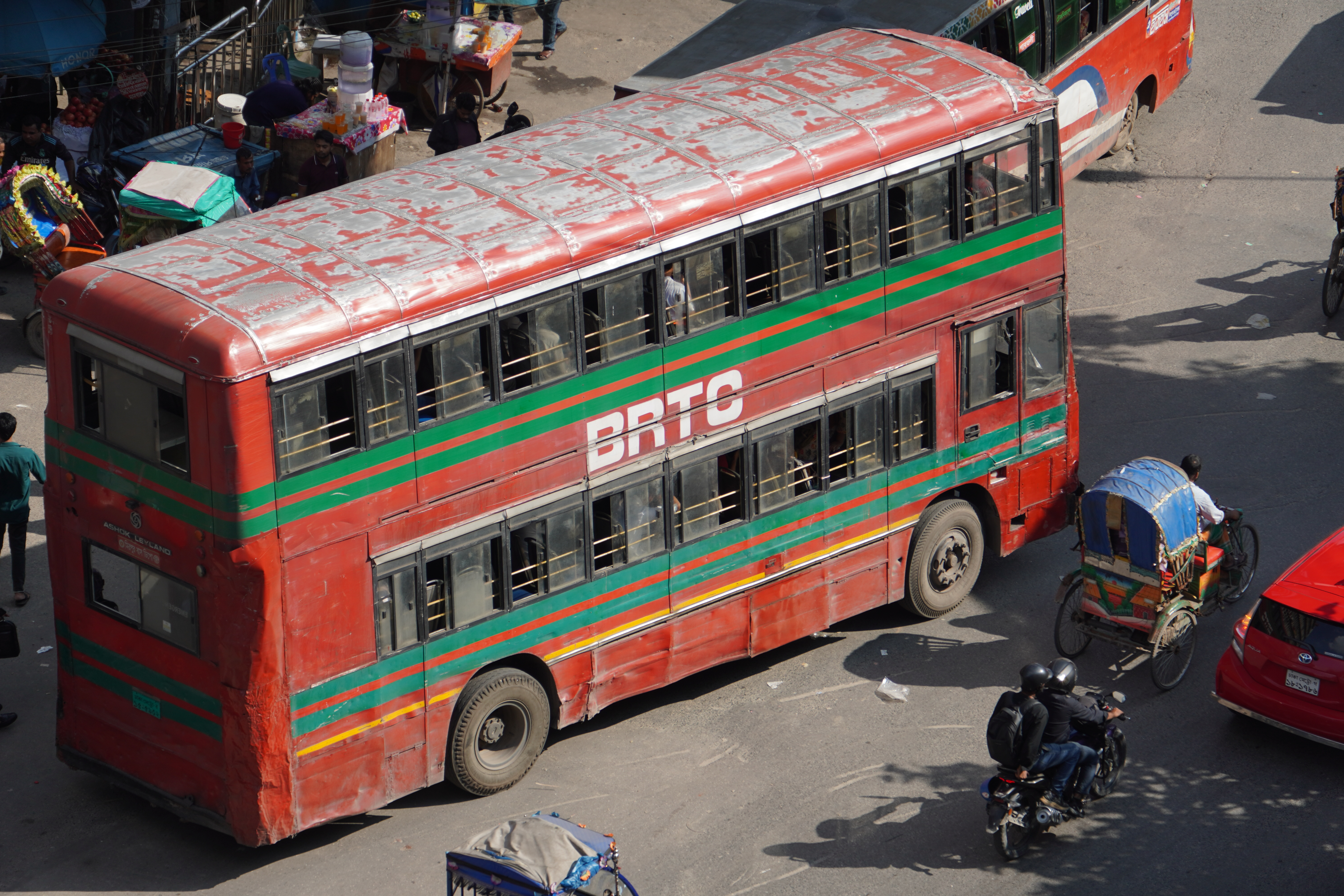
BRTC bus at Mirpur, Dhaka

BRTC provides both passenger and cargo transport services. As well as BRTC also provide driving training for mass people.

BRTC operates three international bus services (Dhaka to Kolkata, Agartala, and Siliguri in India). Inside Bangladesh, it operates inter-district bus services through its bus depots in Chittagong, Bogra, Comilla, Pabna, Rangpur, Barisal, and Sylhet. It also operates intra-city bus services in many major cities of the country. In total, BRTC has a fleet of 1,350 buses as of February 2024.

For transportation of cargo, BRTC operates a fleet of 170 trucks. About twenty percent of the government food transport uses BRTC's trucks. The two main truck depots are located at Dhaka and Chittagong.

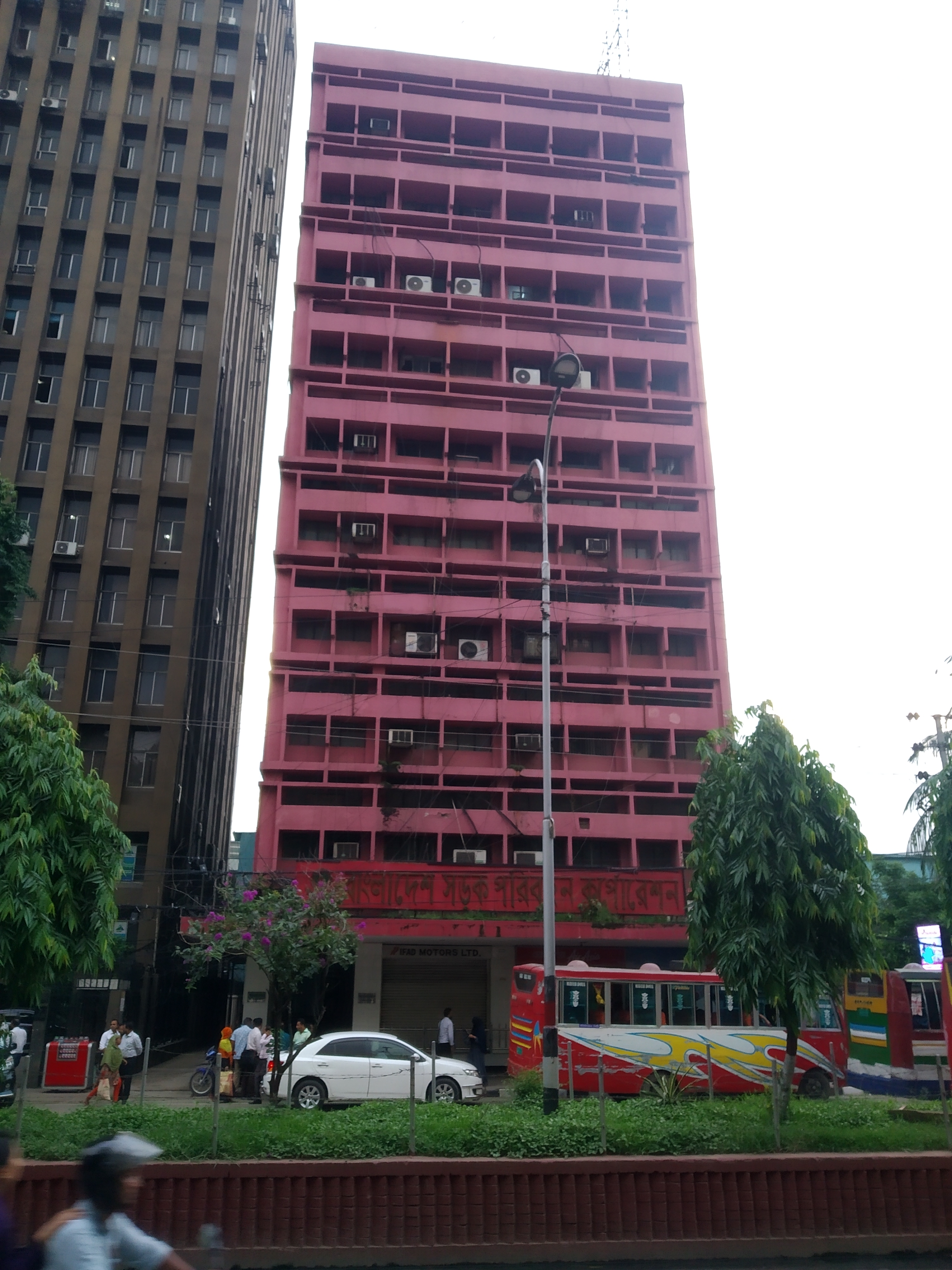
Headquarter of BRTC

BRTC's main driver training institute is located in Joydevpur, Gazipur District, about forty kilometres north of Dhaka. It also has several other training institutes located in Chittagong, Bogra, Khulna, and Jhenaidah. Through these institutes, BRTC provides training in basic car operation and repair.

BRTC also owns a sports club, mainly focusing on football, known as BRTC Sports Club.

=== Special routes ===
Since 18 September 2023 BRTC has been operating a double-decker bus route that will travel on the Dhaka Elevated Expressway.

== Depots ==
1. Joar Sahara
2. Motijheel
3. Kallyanpur
4. Mirpur Double Decker
5. Mohammadpur
6. Gabtali
7. Gazipur
8. Narayanganj
9. Narsingdi
10. Cumilla
11. Chattogram
12. Sylhet
13. Bogura
14. Pabna
15. Sonapur
16. Rangpur
17. Khulna
18. Tungipara
19. Dinajpur
20. Jatrabari
21. Mymensingh
22. Barishal
