= Khidir Canal =

Canal in Dhaka, Bangladesh

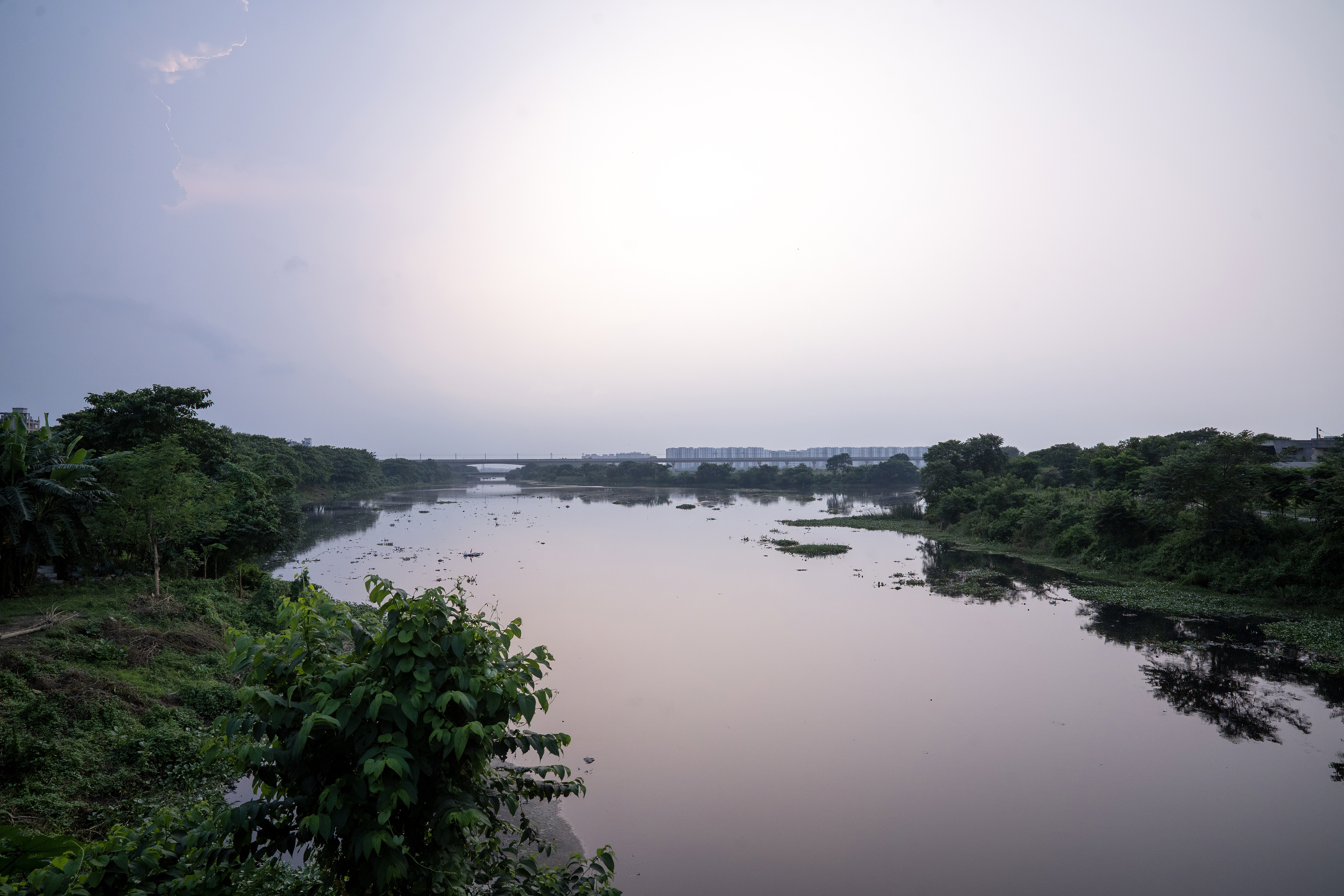
- The canal in 2024
- Interactive map of Khidir Canal
- Location: Uttara
- Country: Bangladesh
- Coordinates: 23.8780615°N 90.3852509°E

Specifications
- Length: 8 km (5.0 miles)

History
- Former names: Konai River
- Modern name: RAJUK Canal; Abdullahpur Canal
- Current owner: Dhaka North City Corporation

Geography
- Direction: North-South
- Start point: Sluice Gate, Uttara
- End point: Alokdi, Mirpur
- Beginning coordinates: 23.8800957°N 90.3928387°E
- Ending coordinates: 23.828289°N 90.342691°E
- Branches: Uttara Lake; Diabari Lake
- Branch of: Tongi River
- Connects to: Turag River

Khidir Canal is a canal located in Dhaka, Bangladesh, also known as the RAJUK Canal and partially as the Abdullahpur Canal. This 8-kilometer-long canal originates from the Tongi River, flows through the city's Uttara and Mirpur areas, and merges with the Turag River. It was formed following the disappearance of the Konai River.

== History ==
In the past, the Konai River, originating from the Tongi River in the northern part of Dhaka, used to flow through the areas of Uttara, Pallabi, and Mirpur before merging with the Turag River. In the post-independence period after 1971, due to urbanization, encroachment, and pollution, the river gradually fragmented over four decades into what are now known as the Diabari, Dwigun and Khidir Canal. As of 2010s, due to encroachment and pollution, the canal became disconnected from its source. On 16 March 2021, Dhaka North City Corporation began demolishing illegal structures near the Sluice Gate area to excavate the canal. The excavation was completed three days later, and the rehabilitated canal was inaugurated. The excavation restored the water flow in the area. However, the government has not taken further measures to fully excavate and reclaim the canal. After the initial cleanup, the canal reverted to being a dumping ground. In March 2024, as part of a mosquito control initiative, Md Tazul Islam, the Minister of Local Government, Rural Development and Cooperatives, announced its cleanup. In 2025, as part of the Blue Network programme, re-excavation of the canal began. Within the next eight months, re-excavation of 3.18 kilometers of the canal was completed.

== Description ==
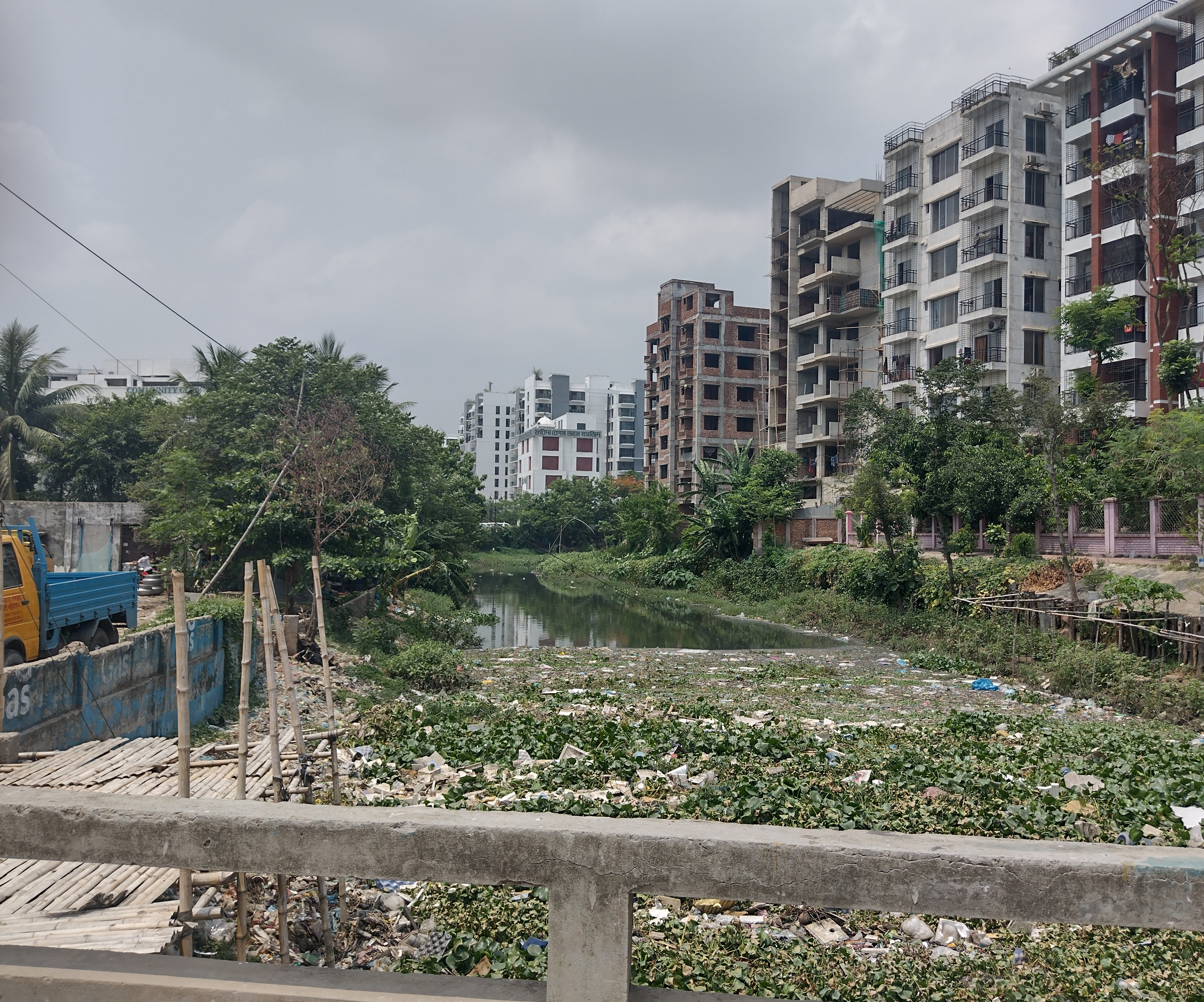
The canal's narrow part near Rupayan City, Khalpar

The canal extends from the now-defunct Harirampur Union to the areas of Uttara Model Town, Bawnia, and Alokdi, covering 8 kilometers in length with its source in the north from the Turag River. Due to encroachment and pollution, it has turned almost into a dead canal and a breeding ground for mosquitoes. Since the canal is connected to Uttara's sewerage system, household waste mixes into it. It is the only canal used for drainage systems in Uttara West and Turag police station areas. Uttara Lake is connected to this canal. Its section stretching from the Abdullahpur sluice gate to Khalpar is known as the Abdullahpur Canal. It is also known as RAJUK Canal. It is maintained by Dhaka North City Corporation. As of 2022, four spots of the canal between Uttara's Sector 10 and Sector 11 have become almost dead.
