= Ahmed Sofa Sarani =

Street in Dhaka

- Mirpur DOHS–Uttara Road
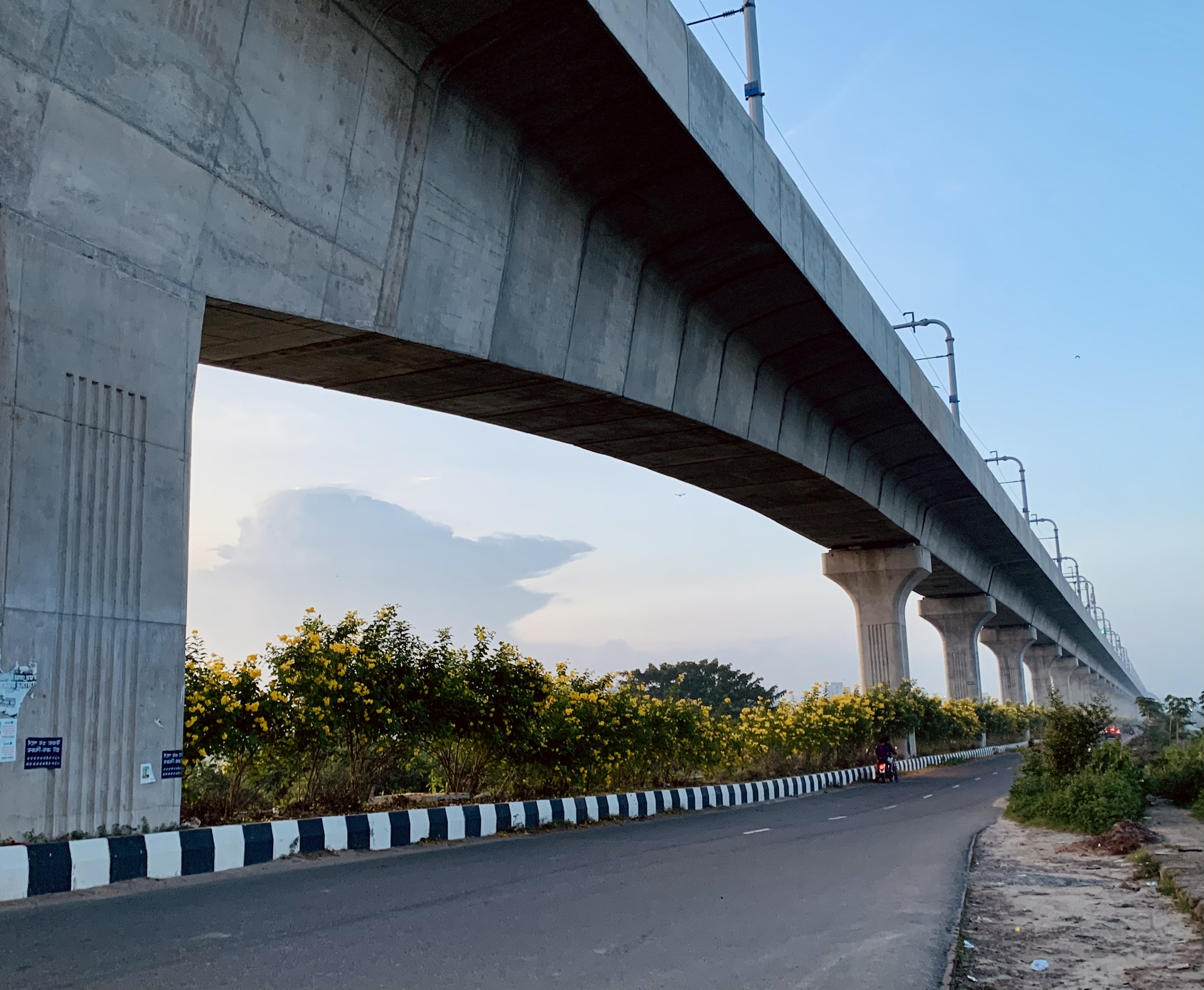
- the street in 2025
- Interactive map of Ahmed Sofa Sarani
- Native name: আহমদ ছফা সরণি (Bengali)
- Former name: Artist Quamrul Hassan Road
- Namesake: Ahmed Sofa
- Type: Street
- Maintained by: Dhaka North City Corporation
- Length: 4.5 km (2.8 mi)
- Location: New Dhaka, Bangladesh
- Nearest Dhaka Metro Rail station: Uttara South; Uttara Center; Uttara North
- Coordinates: 23.860946°N 90.365337°E
- South end: Begum Rokeya Avenue
- Major junctions: DOHS MP Checkpost; South Metro Circle; Sector 15 Circle; Diabari Bottola; DNCC Circle
- North end: Sonargaon Janapath

Construction
- Commissioned: 2016
- Completed: 2022

Other
- Designer: Rajdhani Unnayan Kartripakkha
- Status: Active

Ahmed Sofa Sarani (Bengali: আহমদ ছফা সরণি), also known as Mirpur DOHS–Uttara Road (Bengali: মিরপুর ডিওএইচএস–উত্তরা রোড), is a street in Dhaka, Bangladesh, that was built for the construction of the Mirpur DOHS-to-Uttara section of Dhaka Metro Rail's MRT Line 6. Before the line's construction, the road was a narrow path, which in 2016 was planned to be converted into a street because, due to its narrowness, the line's viaduct could not be built on it. The road runs from the Mirpur Cantonment area to Sector 18 of Uttara and a roundabout at Diabari.

During the construction of the MRT Line 6, the 800-metre (2,600 ft) stretch of the road from Mirpur 12 to Uttara South metro station was constructed with broken bricks; the narrow section was quickly finished to mark the line's inauguration in 2022. The road was later extended to connect with Mirpur and Uttara, and is currently the only road linking the two areas. The construction of this 4.5-kilometre (2.8 mi)-long street connecting Sonargaon Janapath with Mirpur DOHS reduced the travel time between Mirpur and Uttara.

During the construction of Dhaka BRT, traffic congestion on Airport Road increased and drivers started using this street as an alternative. According to the master plan of Dhaka North City Corporation's (DNCC) Detailed Area Plan, a road has been proposed from the end of the street; from Diabari Roundabout to Gazipur.

In 2022, Salehuddin Ahmed, who was involved in Dhaka's bus-route rationalization project, said this street would be included in the project's route. The section of the street from Mirpur 12 to Uttara South metro station, however, is not wide enough, causing traffic jams and inconvenience to the passengers. Dhaka Mass Transit Company Limited (DMTCL) constructed the road and, according to DNCC, they are not in possession of it so are unable to address the issue. In 2023, M.A.N. Siddique, the then-Managing Director of DMTCL, said they had written to the authorities asking to take over responsibility for the road. In addition, the 800-metre (2,600 ft)-long section has become prone to accidents due to its collapse after its inauguration. In 2024, the then-DNCC mayor Atiqul Islam stated the authorities were trying to rebuild the section.

On 20 December 2023, in a DNCC meeting, a proposal to name the street after Patua Quamrul Hassan, who designed the revised version of the flag of Bangladesh, was accepted. In May 2024, it was reported that DNCC forwarded the approved proposal to the Ministry of Local Government, Rural Development and Co-operatives. As of December 2024, according to users of the problematic street, they have been facing difficulties for several years, yet the authorities have not shown sincerity in repairing it. Later, on 11 March 2025, the MP Checkpost-to-Uttara South metro station section was closed for repairs, and after completion of the repairs, it was reopened on 14 March 2025. Mohammad Azaz, The administrator of Dhaka North City Corporation, stated that the repaired section will be replaced by a bridge in the future to protect Khidir Canal. On 11 December 2025, an announcement was made via the DNCC's Facebook page that the street would be named after the writer Ahmed Sofa. On 21 December 2025, the DNCC installed and inaugurated the street's nameplate with the new name officially.
