= Mugdho Mancha =

Open stage in Dhaka, Bangladesh

- মুগ্ধ মঞ্চ
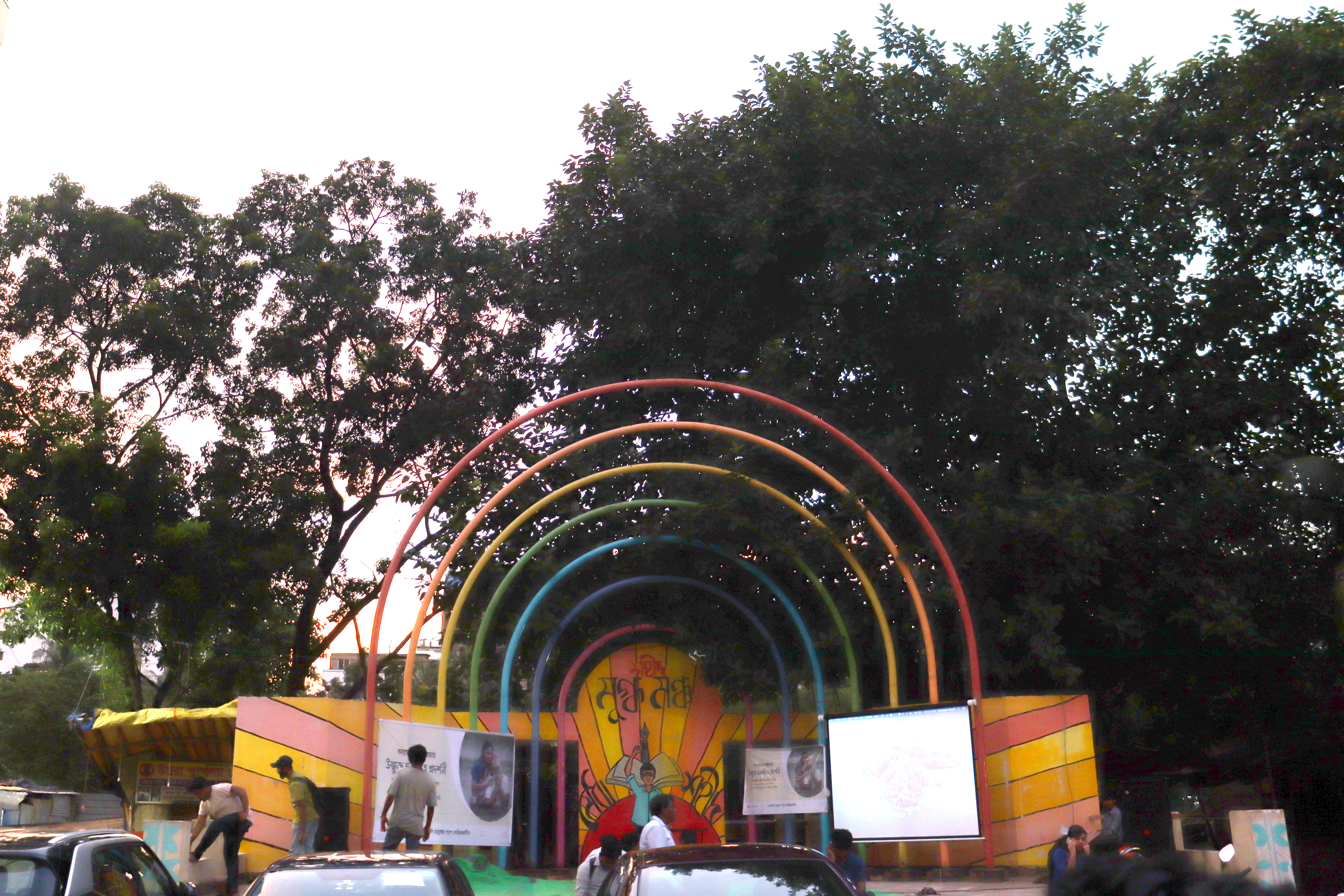
- Mugdho Mancha in 2024
- Interactive map of Mugdho Mancha
- Full name: Shaheed Mir Mugdho Mancha
- Former names: Rabindra Sarani Botomool (pre-2016); Language Warrior Poet Mahbub Ul Alam Choudhury Mancha (2016–2019); Bangabandhu Mukto Mancha (2019–2024)
- Address: Sangam Square, Rabindra Sarani, Sector 7, Uttara Model Town, Dhaka, Bangladesh
- Coordinates: 23.8672649°N 90.3933674°E
- Owner: Dhaka North City Corporation

Construction
- Opened: 12 February 2016; 10 years ago (as venue); 19 March 2022; 4 years ago (as outdoor stage); 4 August 2025; 14 months ago (reconstruction)

Mugdho Mancha (Bengali: মুগ্ধ মঞ্চ, romanized: Mugdhô Môncô) is an outdoor cultural stage and event venue located in Uttara, Dhaka, Bangladesh.

It was built at Botomool which is situated at the western end of Rabindra Sarani in Sector 7 and was named as Language Warrior Poet Mahbub Ul Alam Chowdhury Mancha in memory of Bengali language movement activist Mahbub Ul Alam Choudhury while organizing street drama in 2016.

The Dhaka North City Corporation later assured to construct a stage structure at the site following the demands of Gitanjali Lalitkala Academy founder director Mahbub Amin Mithu. In 2022, the structure was inaugurated as the Bangabandhu Mukto Mancha in memory of Bangabandhu Sheikh Mujibur Rahman, the first president of Bangladesh.

Later in 2024, it was renamed to the present name in memory of Mir Mahfuzur Rahman Mugdho, a student who died in July massacre.

== History ==
In 2016, Gitanjali Lalitkala Academy organized a street theatre festival at the Botomool in Rabindra Sarani, Uttara, Dhaka, which was the first street theatre initiative organized in the area. At the time, the place where the street plays was staged was named in memory of Mahbub Ul Alam Choudhury, an activist of the Bengali language movement. Due to the lack of infrastructure in Uttara, cultural organizations had been demanding the construction of an outdoor venue structure to host events. In 2019, a book fair, discussion meeting and cultural festival were held at the same venue from March 17 to March 26. During the program, Mahbub Amin Mithu, founder of Gitanjali Lalitkala Academy, proposed the construction of a stage infrastructure at the place, and he was assured of its implementation with support. Nazrul researcher Rafiqul Islam advised to name the proposed stage structure after Bangabandhu Sheikh Mujibur Rahman. In 2020, Uttara's first cultural outdoor structure had started under the supervision of Dhaka North City Corporation. As of 2021, the construction was ongoing. On 19 March 2022, the outdoor stage, built for the purpose of hang out and organizing cultural events, was inaugurated. It was renamed to its current name in 2024 in memory of student Mir Mahfuzur Rahman Mugdho who died in Azampur, Uttara during mass killings in July Revolution, named as July massacre. On the night of 23 January 2025, a group of assailants vandalized the pictures of those killed in the massacre displayed on Mugdho Mancha and smeared ink over its stage's name. In response, the Anti-discrimination Students Movement and the Jatiya Nagorik Committee protested and issued a 24-hour ultimatum for the arrest of the perpetrators. On 25 January 2025, in response to an invitation from the Anti-discrimination Students Movement and the Jatiya Nagorik Committee, Nahid Islam, the advisor to the Ministry of Posts, Telecommunications and Information Technology, visited the stage and assured the invitees that the administration would take action against the perpetrators. Then in April, the entire structure was repainted and decorated with art. It was reported that the stage would be reconstructed under the initiative of Dhaka North City Corporation, for which Shibli Hawlader, a member of the committee associated with the stage, submitted a permanent design. On 2 May 2025, Riazul Islam, the chairman of the Capital Development Authority, stated that he had instructed his subordinates to present the Mugdho Mancha in a different way, dedicating it to the July Revolution. In addition, he announced a plan to build a park behind the stage named after Mir Mahfuzur Rahman Mugdha. On 4 August 2025, the reconstructed structure was inaugurated.

== Activities and observances ==
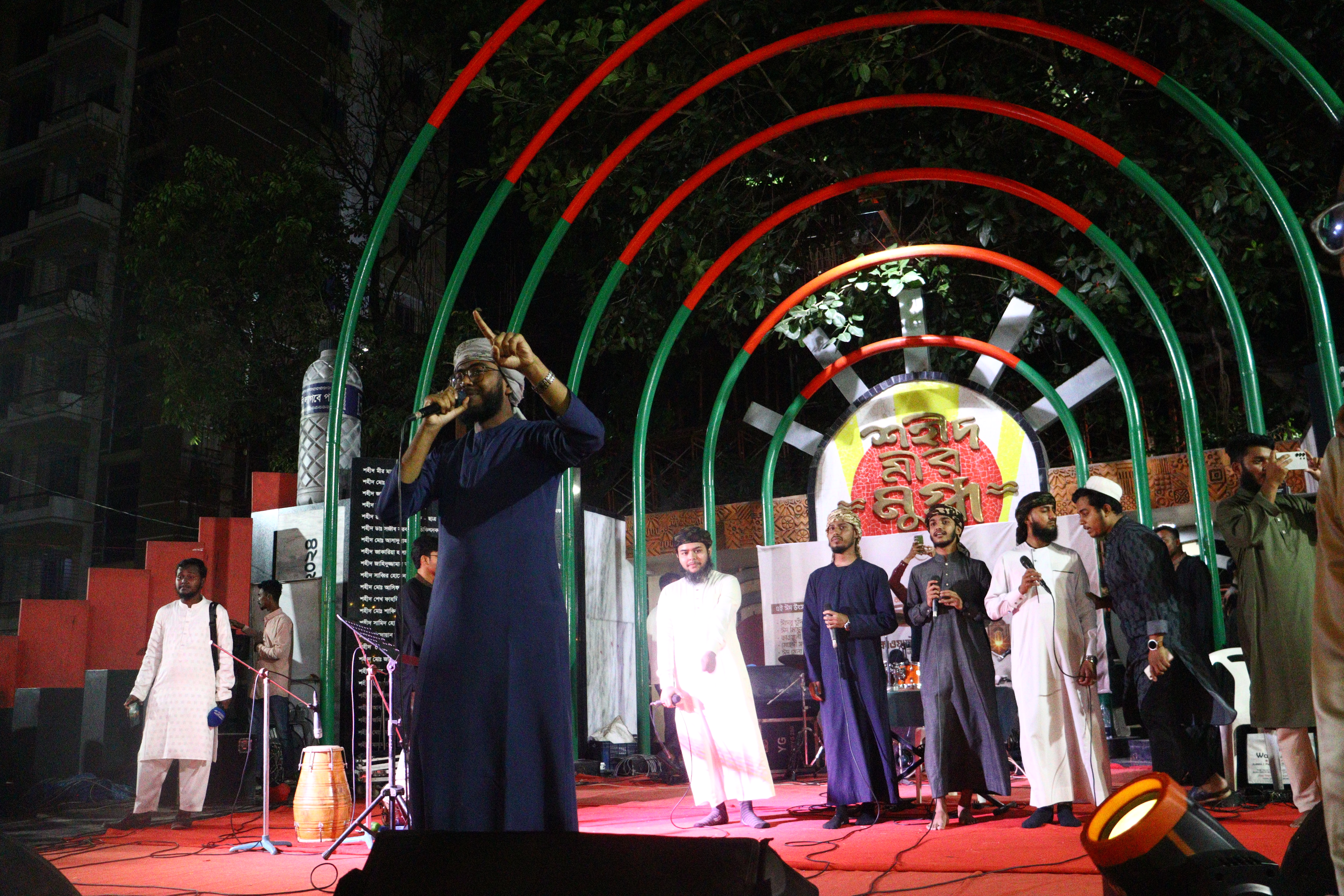
Eid al-Fitr celebration, 2026

In 2015, a cultural program was organized on 17 and 18 December in Botomool on the occasion of Bangladesh's Victory Day. In 2018, on the occasion of the spring festival, a street theatre festival was organized on the stage under the initiative of Theater Angaan. On 23 March of the same year, an open short film festival was held at the Botomool under the initiative of the Dhaka Film Movement where 12 selected films were screened. Then on 8 November, theater personality Mamunur Rashid inaugurated the first Uttara Cultural Festival at the outdoor venue. On the occasion of the International Mother Language Day in 2020, the stars of the entertainment world took part in the art decoration painting organized by artist Liton Kar on the stage. In the same year, in the context of the COVID-19 pandemic, Gitanjali Lalitkala Academy conducted a relief distribution program at the stage. Dhaka North City Corporation then provided a hand washing basin, soap and water at the stage as part of a hand washing program to raise public awareness about the COVID-19 pandemic. In 2021, Uttara Cultural Society organized a cultural program on the occasion of the golden jubilee of Bangladesh's Victory Day. On the occasion of Bangladesh Genocide Remembrance Day and Bangladesh's Independence Day in 2022, Uttara Artists Association organized a cultural festival at the Mukto Mancha. After that, a cultural program was organized in the same year on the occasion of the Bengali New Year by the initiative of New Year Celebration Council in association with several organizations. On the occasion of the birthday of Sheikh Mujibur Rahman in 2023, Gitanjali Lalitkala Academy organized a day-long cultural program at Mukto Mancha. In the following year, his birthday was celebrated at the same venue. In August 3 of that year, a candlelit vigil was held at Mukto Mancha to commemorate those killed during the quota reform movement. On 30 August and 1 September, Padmapuran, The Golden Wings of Watercocks, Ora 7 Jon and Santaao were screened on the venue to raise funds for the victims of the August 2024 floods. In the same year, the site is selected for Durga Puja for 2024. In 2025, In January 2025, Bangladesh Jamaat-e-Islami organized a political conference and cultural event at the location. In February of the same year, although the scheduled event for Pohela Falgun was supposed to take place at the designated venue, it could not be held because of an objection which claimed that one of the organisers for the scheduled event was a supporter of Awami League. In April, people organized a protest rally at Mugdho Mancha in response to the resumption of Israeli attack on Gaza. On 1 July 2025, the Proclamation of the July Revolution, containing 9-point proposals, was read here. In 2026, a month-long Islamic cultural program was organized here on the occasion of Ramadan.
