= ITHS =

ITHS can refer to the following

- IT History Society
- International Turkish Hope School, Dhaka
