= M. Monsur Ali Medical College =

M. Monsur Ali Medical College may refer to:

- Shaheed M. Monsur Ali Medical College, Sirajganj, a public medical school in Bangladesh, established in 2014
- Shaheed Monsur Ali Medical College, a private medical college in Uttara Model Town, Uttara Dhaka
