= Uttara Lake =

Lake in Dhaka, Bangladesh

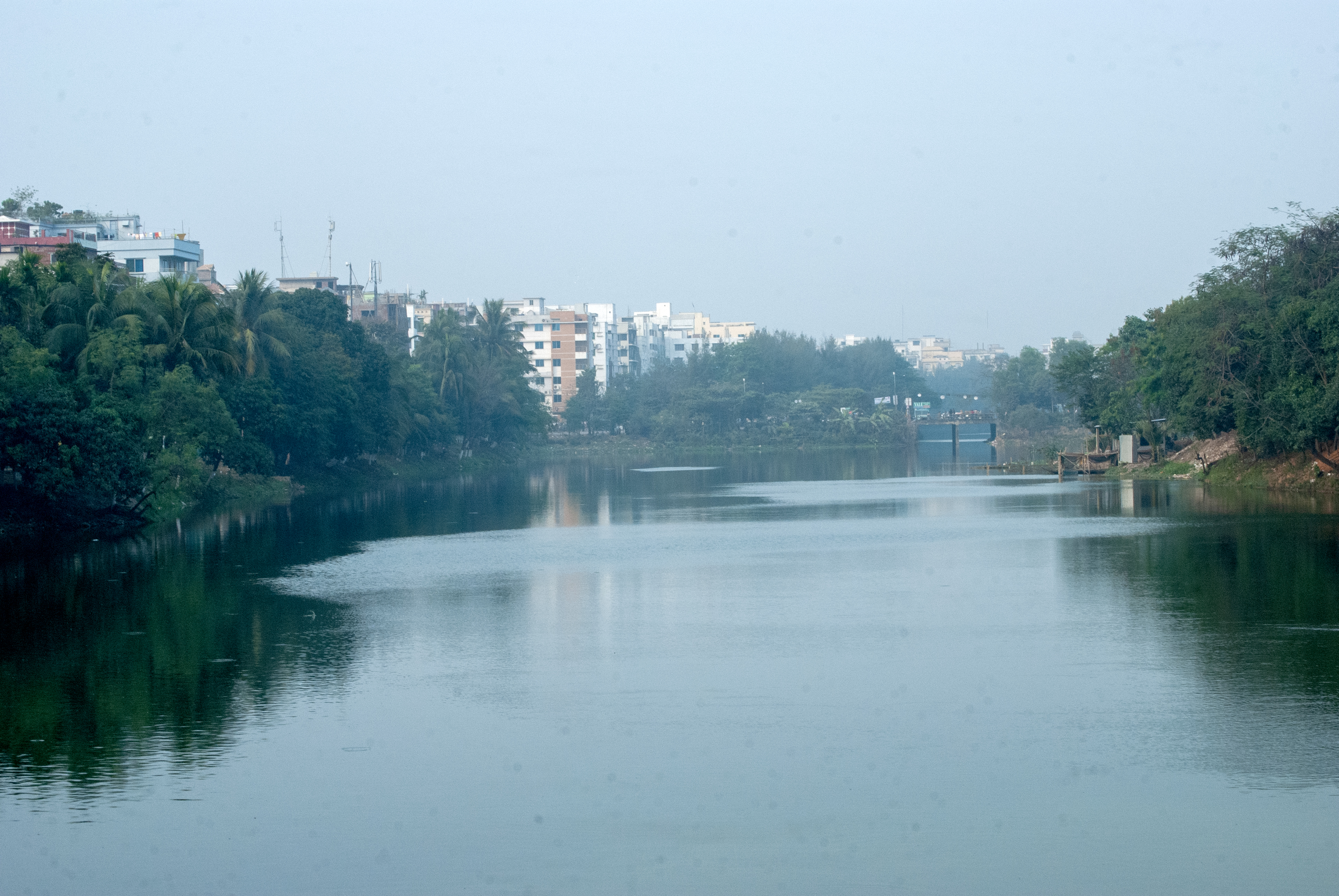
- Lake in 2012
- Interactive map of Uttara Lake
- Location: Uttara
- Coordinates: 23.8720°N 90.3938°E
- Type: Artificial
- Basin countries: Bangladesh
- Settlements: Dhaka

Uttara Lake is a man-made lake in Uttara Model Town, a neighborhood in Dhaka, Bangladesh. It flows from the area between sector 9 and 11 to the area between sector 3 and 5.

This 3-kilometer-long lake is divided into three sections and crosses the Sonargaon Janapath street, stretching north to Shaheed Monsur Ali Medical College and south to the area near Hazrat Shahjalal International Airport.

== Issues ==
This lake is considered to be in the worst condition among the city's lakes. Due to the negligence of the authorities, its beauty is gradually deteriorating. Additionally, the construction of commercial structures by filling parts of the lake has put its existence at risk. Continuous pollution and encroachment have caused parts of the lake to disappear.

== Renovation ==
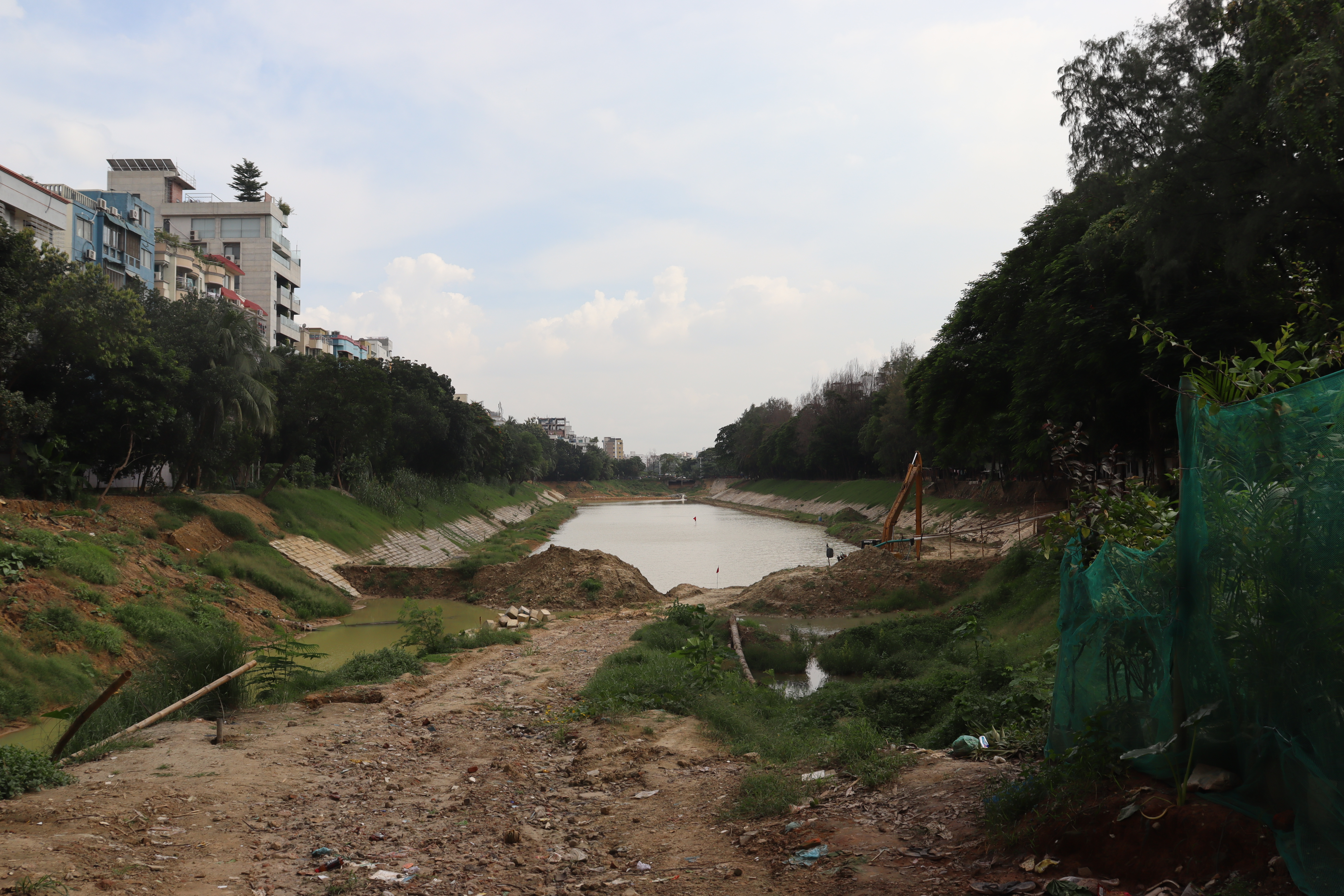
Condition of Uttara Lake in 2024

Due to issues such as narrow sections of the 100-meter-wide lake, broken embankments obstructing pathways around it, accumulated garbage, and water pollution, the Rajdhani Unnayan Kartripakkha decided to renovate the lake in 2013. The renovation project included rebuilding two bridges, constructing a culvert across the Sonargaon Janapath, creating and preserving walkways along the lake, removing waste, and dredging the lake. Although a budget of ৳373.2 million was allocated in 2014 with a two-year timeline for completion, the master plan was prepared during the 2016–2017 fiscal year, and renovation work officially began in November 2017. However, in 2018, authorities decided on a new renovation project worth ৳20.80 billion, which included additional features such as public toilets, a water deck, a hanging deck, a gymnasium, fountains, drinking water facilities, and an open stage. Later, the new plan was scrapped, and the completion of the original renovation project was set for 2019. Due to delays, the timeline was extended by another year. By 2020, 20% of the renovation work was still incomplete, leading to an increase in the project cost to ৳949.8 million and an extended timeline until 2023. The project was later scaled down to include only embankment stabilization and dredging to increase the lake's depth. Following recommendations from the consulting firm Data Expert Limited, concrete blocks were used to pave the lakebed and embankments. The timeline was further extended to June 2025. In 2024, allegations were made against the renovation contractor, Convoice, for illegally selling excavated soil from the lake. In February 2025, it was reported that the surrounding banks, walkways, and several buildings were damaged during re-excavation of parts of the lake between Sectors 9 and 11.
