= Uttara (neighbourhood) =

Neighbourhood of Dhaka, Bangladesh

Uttara উত্তরা
- Neighbourhood
- Uttara Model Town
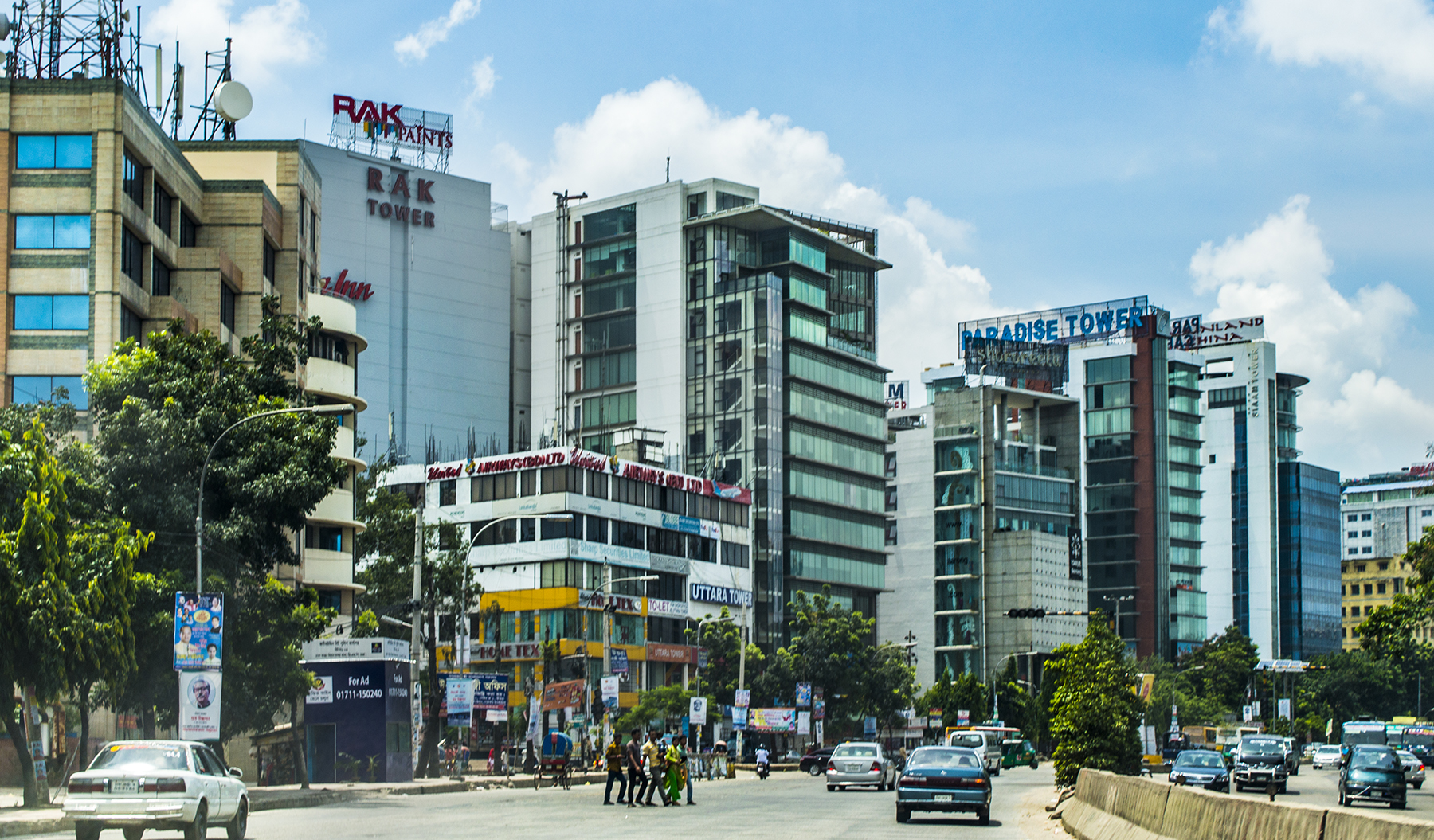
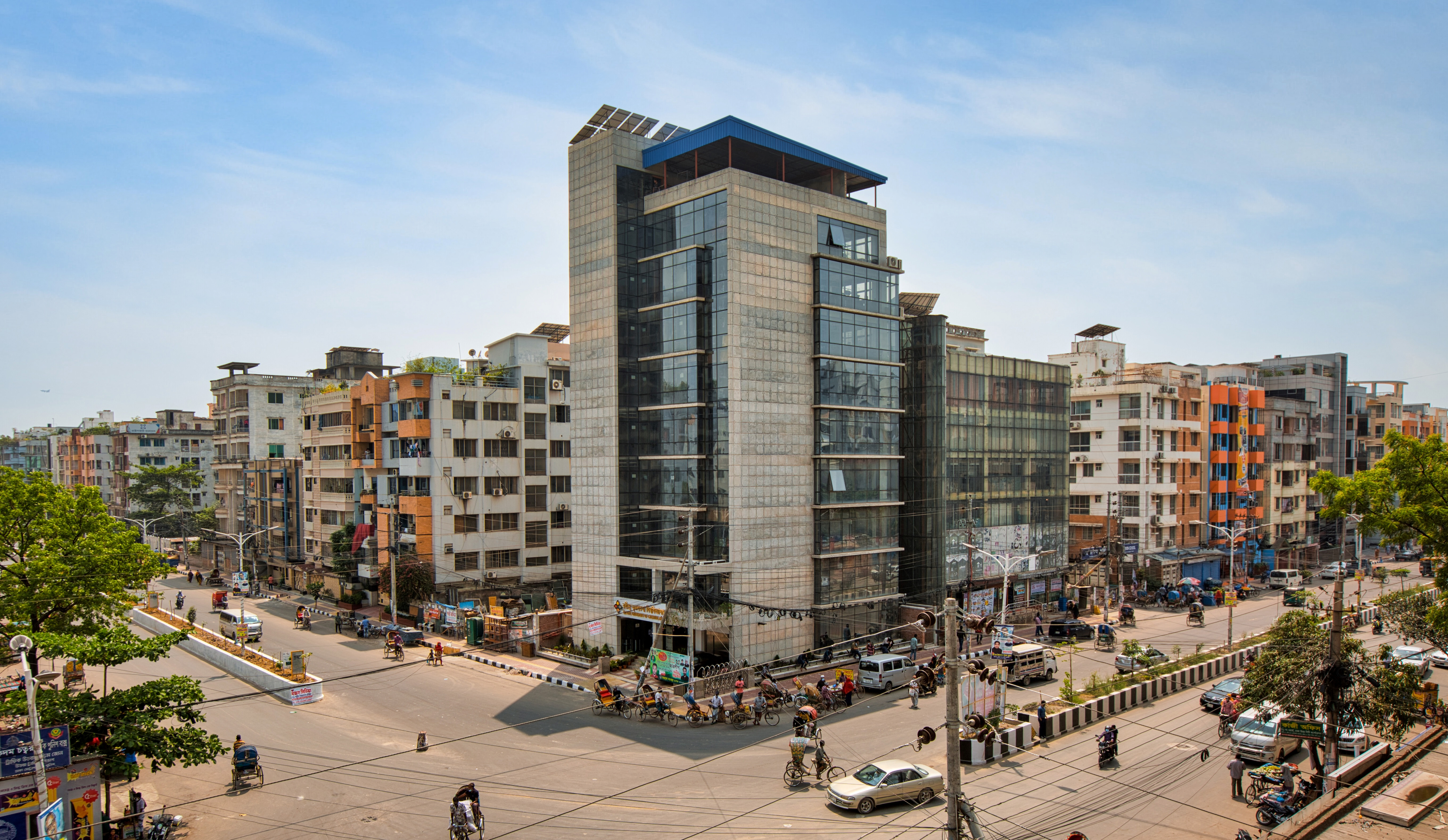
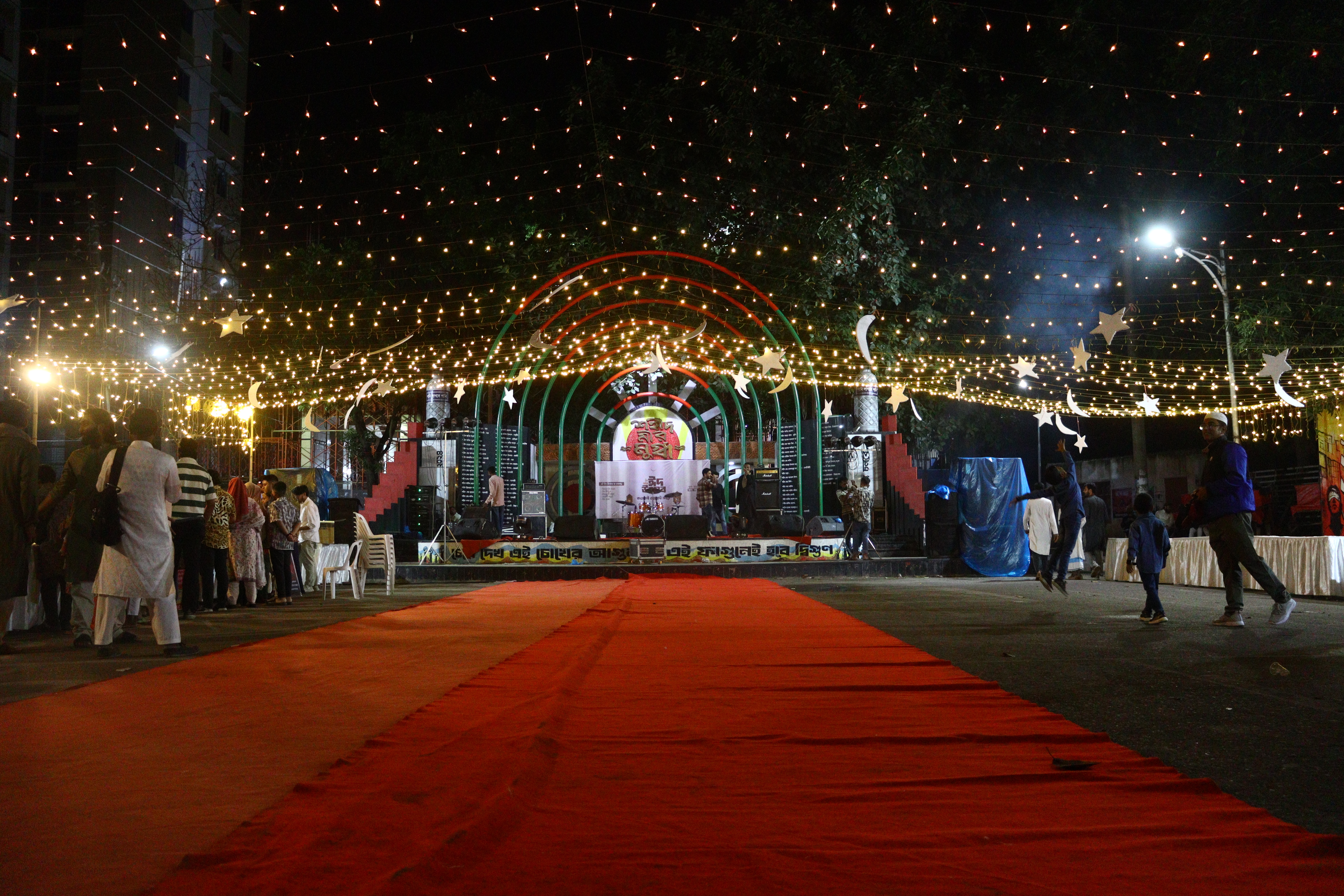
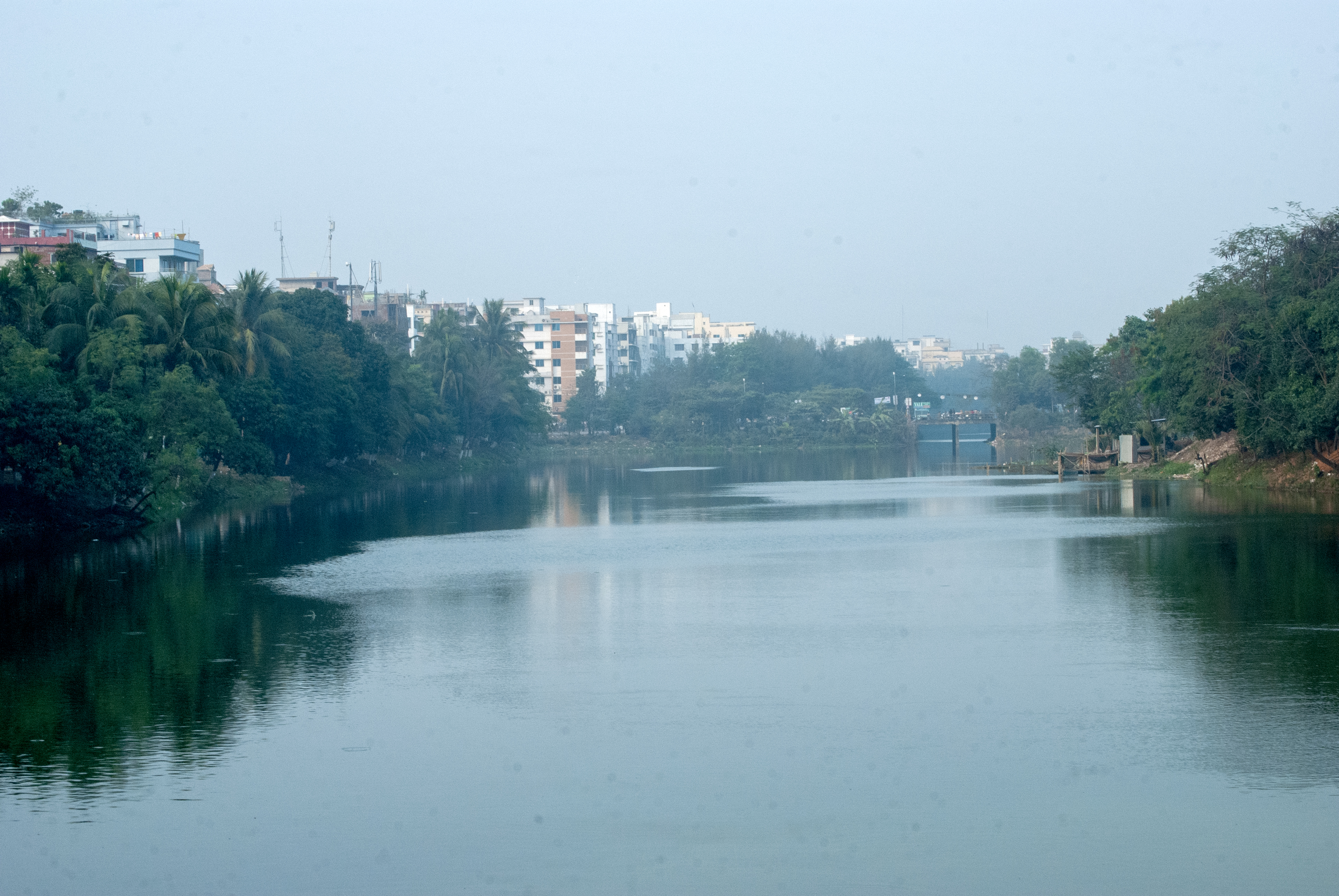
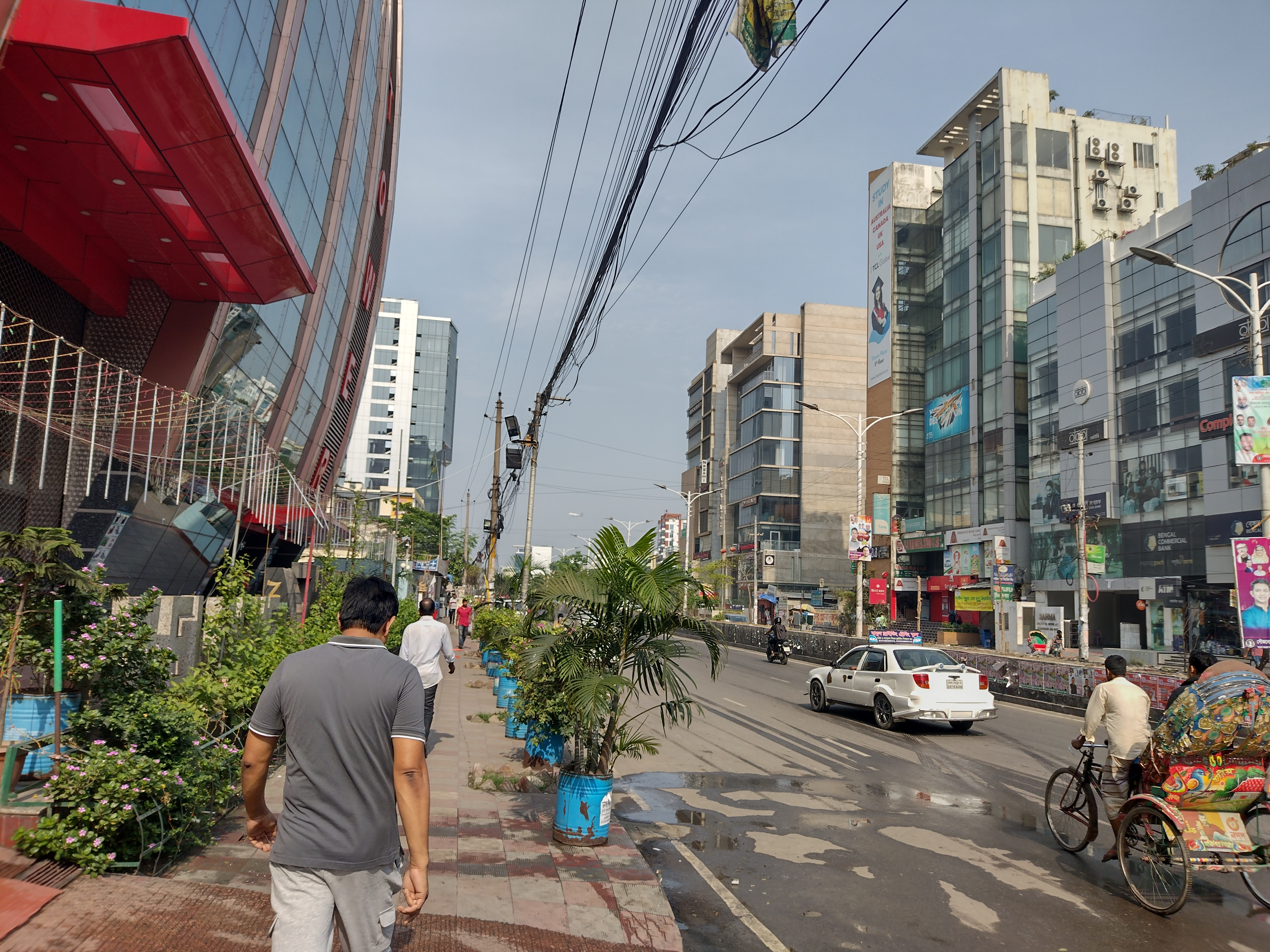
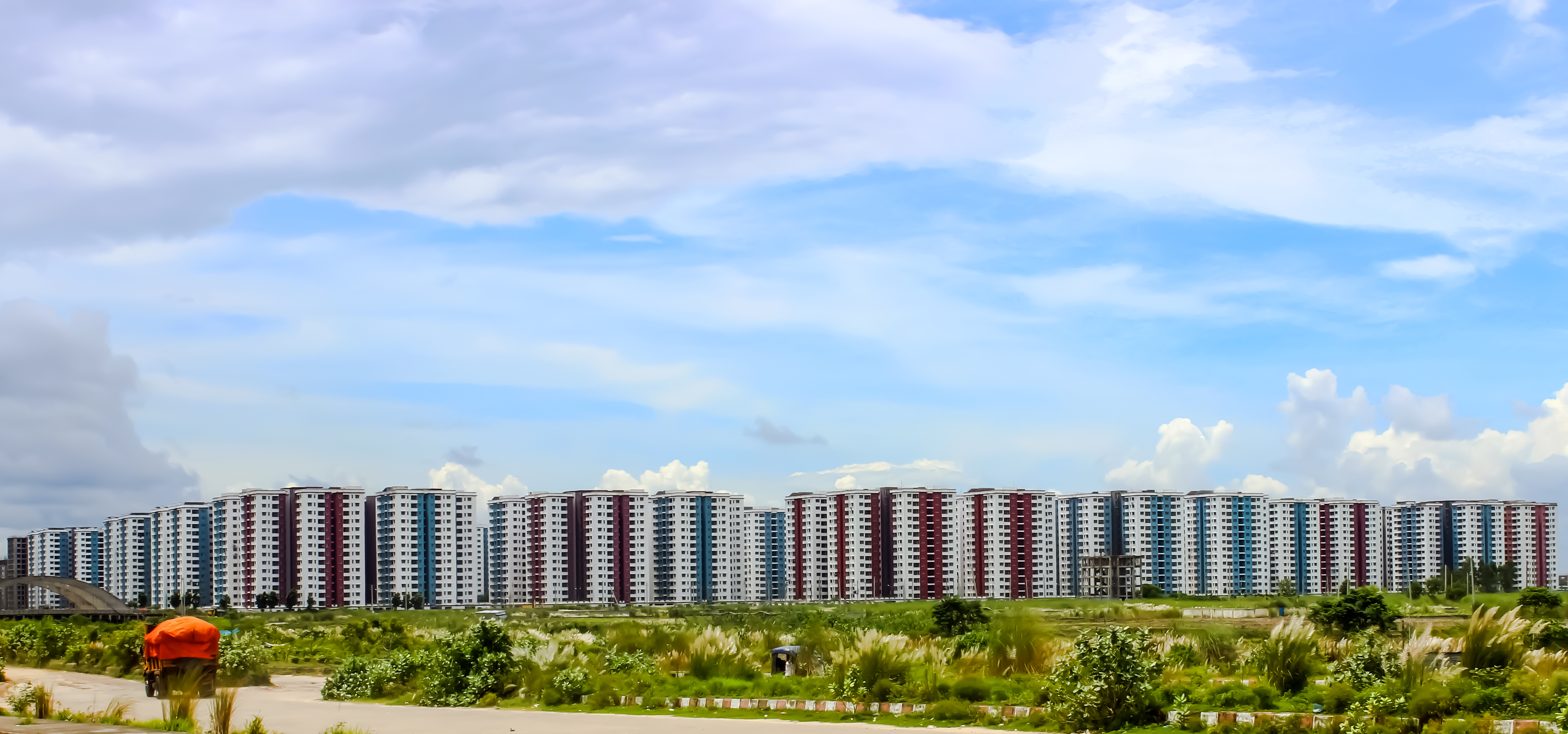
- Airport Road Kadam Square Mugdho Mancha Uttara Lake Sonargaon Janapath RAJUK Uttara Apartment Project

- Location of Uttara Uttara (Bangladesh)
- Coordinates: 23.877°N 90.377°E
- Country: Bangladesh
- Division: Dhaka Division
- District: Dhaka District
- Metropolitan: DNCC
- Establishment: 25 June 1967
- Founder: RAJUK

Area
  - Total: 36.91 km^{2} (14.25 sq mi)
- Elevation: 23 m (75 ft)

Population (2011)
  - Total: 179,907
  - Density: 4,874.2/km^{2} (12,624/sq mi)
- Time zone: UTC+6 (BST)
- Postal code: 1230

Uttara Model Town or simply Uttara (Bengali: উত্তরা, romanized: Uttôrā, lit. 'The North [of Dhaka]'; IPA: [ut̪ːɔɹa]) is a neighbourhood of Dhaka, the capital of Bangladesh. It lies on the road to Gazipur, and adjoins Hazrat Shahjalal International Airport.

== History ==
After the partition of India in 1947, Dhaka became the provincial capital of East Pakistan. However, due to the increasing pressure on the city and population density, the authorities began to recognize the need to develop new residential areas for Dhaka during the 1960s. In 1965, the Dhaka Improvement Trust (present-day Rajdhani Unnayan Kartripakkha, abbreviated as RAJUK) conducted a survey for the construction of a satellite town for Dhaka. The survey recommended the construction of a 2,404-acre satellite town in the Azampur–Faydabad area between Tongi and Kurmitola Airport (present-day Hazrat Shahjalal International Airport). On 25 June 1967, the foundation stone of the project was laid by the governor of East Pakistan, Abdul Monem Khan. The project was scheduled to be completed during the 1971–1972 fiscal year. Under the initial plan, the project included 20,000 plots for a population of 124,000 people, but the number of plots was later reduced to 4,302. After the independence of Bangladesh, a mass grave from the Bangladesh Liberation War was discovered near the Narayanganj–Bahadurabad Ghat line in the proposed satellite town. The project was named "North Satellite Town", which was renamed "Uttara Residential Model Town" in 1980, and it was administratively divided into nine sectors. Later, due to necessity, a significant portion of Sector 1 was allocated to the Civil Aviation Authority of Bangladesh, while the entirety of Sector 2 was allocated to the Bangladesh Police. By the 1985–1986 fiscal year, the first phase of the project had been completed, making the plots in Uttara's nine sectors available for use by their owners. Among the nine sectors, two sectors were allocated as commercial areas and for housing government officers and employees.

Before settlements developed, Uttara was primarily a rural area. Most of it consisted of low-lying land, while the remaining areas outside the villages remained submerged under water. After the city was affected by the 1988 floods, the government constructed the Dhaka Embankment and filling in Uttara's wetlands began. By 1990, the first phase of the project had been completed. In 1992, the RAJUK initiated the second phase to expand Uttara westward in response to increasing migration pressure on the city. The second phase consisted of five sectors covering a total area of 438 acres and was completed in 1998. In 1999, the third phase of Uttara was announced. However, after several revisions, it was finalized in 2009. The plan called for the westward expansion of the second phase by four additional sectors over an area of 2,008 acres to accommodate 500,000 people. The plan included temporary housing for government officers and employees, as well as an apartment project for low-income families. The apartment project in Sector 18 was planned in three separate blocks. In 2022, Uttara came under the network of Dhaka Metro Rail. In 2024, during the July Uprising, 70 people were killed in police firing while protesters participated in demonstrations. In 5 August, as reactions of being subjected to repression, an enraged crowd attacked Uttara East police atation and set it on fire. Four police personnel were killed in the incident, and weapons from the station were looted. One block of third phase's apartment project was completed by 2025, while the deadline for the remaining two blocks was extended to 2030. In 21 July of the same year, 35 people, including the pilot, were killed in the Chengdu J-7 crash at the campus of Milestone School and College in Uttara.

== Demographics ==
At the 2011 Bangladesh census, Uttara had a population of 179,907. According to the 2011 figures, males constitute 56.33% of the population and females 43.67%, and about 80% of the neighborhood's population are adults. Uttara has an average literacy rate of 90.49% (people 7 and older) which is much higher than the average literacy rate in Bangladesh at 77.9% as of 2023.

== Administration ==
Uttara is divided into administrative and geographical divisions named sectors. There are 18 sectors in Uttara. Every sector is organized under a sector welfare association. Uttara Association is the combination of these sector-wise associations. The neighborhood is under two wards (Ward no. 1 and Ward no. 51) of Dhaka North City Corporation. Politically this area is in the Dhaka-18 constituency of the Jatiya Sangsad.

=== Ward councillors ===
Ward	Area	Name	Ref.
01	Sectors 1 to 10	Afsar Uddin Khan	
51	Sectors 11 to 14	Mohammad Sharifur Rahman	

== Geography ==
=== Inner Uttara ===
- Sector 1
- Sector 2
- Sector 3
- Sector 4
- Sector 5
- Sector 6
- Sector 7
- Sector 8
- Sector 9
- Sector 10
- Sector 11
- Sector 12
- Sector 13
- Sector 14
- Sector 15
- Sector 16
- Sector 17
- Sector 18

=== Outer Uttara ===
- Uttarkhan (Uttar Khan)
- Dakshinkhan (Dakshin Khan or Daxinkhan)
- Phulbaria (Adjacent to Sector 10)
- Ranabhola (Adjacent to Sector 10)
- Kamarpara (Adjacent to Sector 10)
- Dhour
- Bamnartek
- Nolbhog
- Noa Nagar
- Dolipara (Adjacent to Sector 5)
- Katoitala (Adjacent to Sector 5)
- Pakuria
- Diabari
- Khantek
- Jatrabari
- Ahalia
- Ashkona
- Khalpar
- Tarartek
- Abdullahpur (Situated at the banks of Turag River, adjacent to Sector 9)

=== Private housing ===
- Priyanka City (Adjacent to Sector 12)
- Rupayan City (Situated to the west at the end of Sector 12)

== Economy ==
Uttara is a planned city and is one of the elite suburbs in Dhaka. For that reason, and due to many other features, Uttara is one of the most desirable residential areas in Dhaka. According to a survey conducted by B-Property in 2019, Uttara is the first choice of Dhaka residents for living. Nuswardi is Chief Executive of the property website B-Property. He said to BBC Bangla that this planned satellite town is an important place in the capital of Bangladesh which has all necessary amenities and services the residents need. In the future, more and more people will start living in Purbachal, which is located adjacent to the area so it is a plus point.

Uttara is a popular destination for shooting Bangladeshi dramas.

Sector 7 Bridge is a popular destination for street food lovers. Home to many street food vendors, the suburbs also house many posh, luxurious restaurants and fine-dinings. Residents from other parts of Dhaka visit these restaurants frequently.

== Parks and recreation ==
Uttara has a total of eight parks. Sectors 1, 2, 5, 8, 9 and 10 have no parks. There are numerous lakes in Uttara, including Uttara Lake, however there are no lakes in sectors 1, 2, 6, 8, 10 and 12. Khidir Canal also runs through the neighborhood. There is a children's amusement park in Sector 15 named Fantasy Island.

== Transportation ==
=== Roads ===
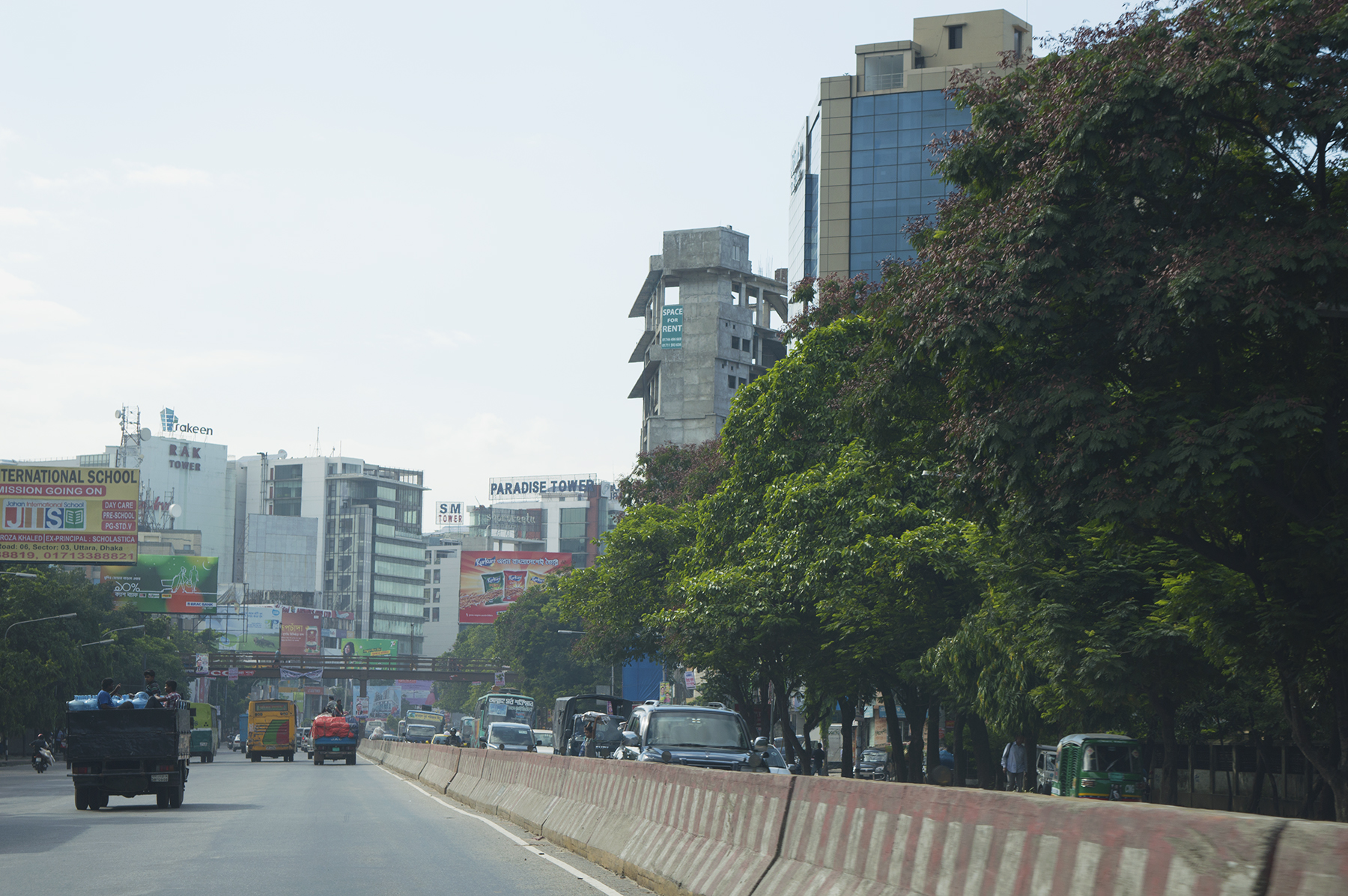
Uttara Airport Road

Many bus routes provide various transportation services in Uttara. Many taxi services are available in this area such as Uber, Pathao, Shohoz, and InDrive.

=== Rail ===
Residents of Uttara use the Dhaka Airport Railway Station to travel. Situated opposite to Hazrat Shahjalal International Airport, it is accessible via the Airport Road.

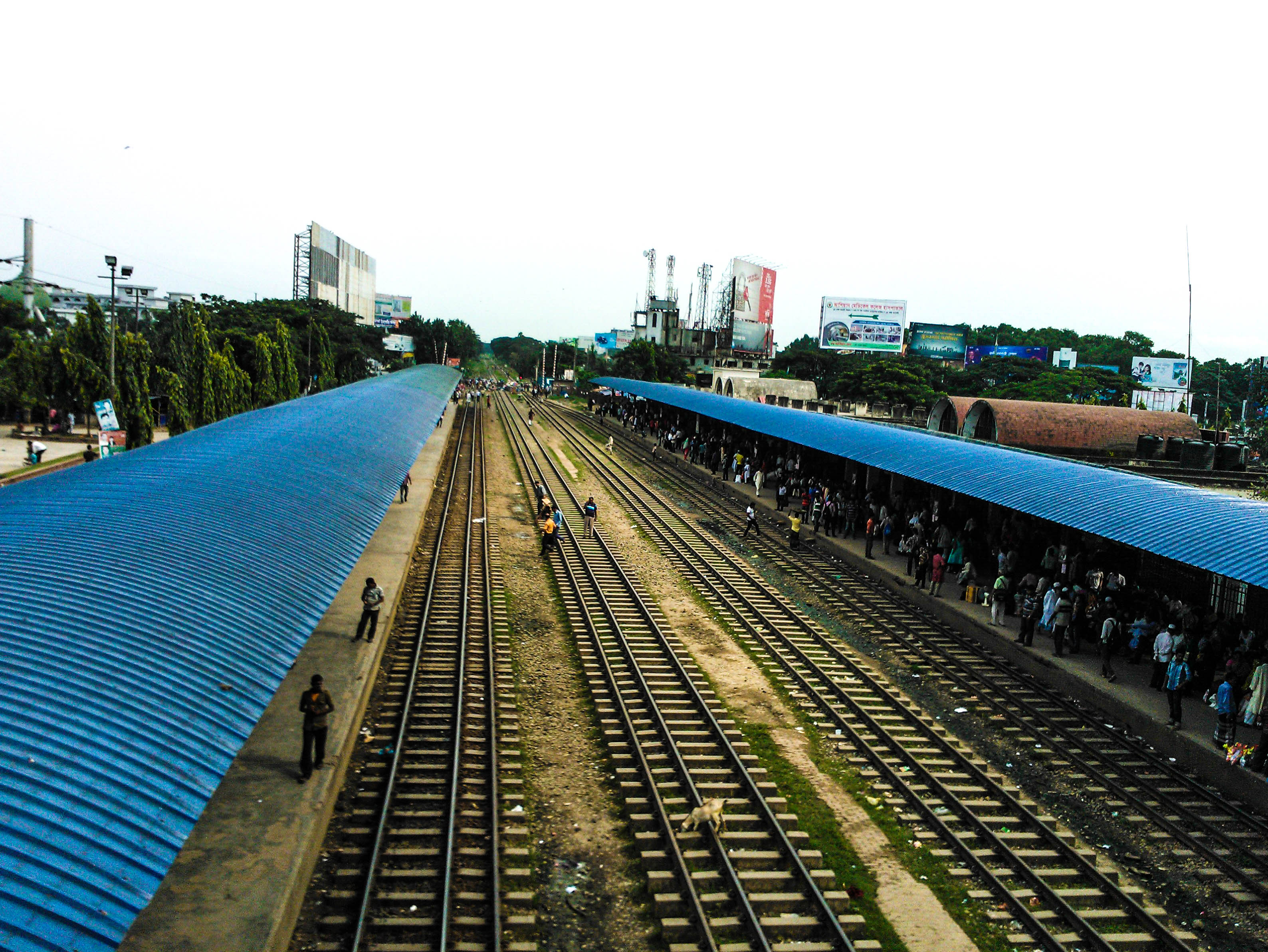
Dhaka Airport Railway Station

View of Sector 15 from train window while traveling from Uttara North to Uttara Center metro station

At present, the MRT Line 6 of Dhaka Metro connects Diabari of Uttara to Motijheel There are three metro stations in Uttara under MRT Line 6, these include: Uttara North, Uttara Centre and Uttara South.

=== Air ===
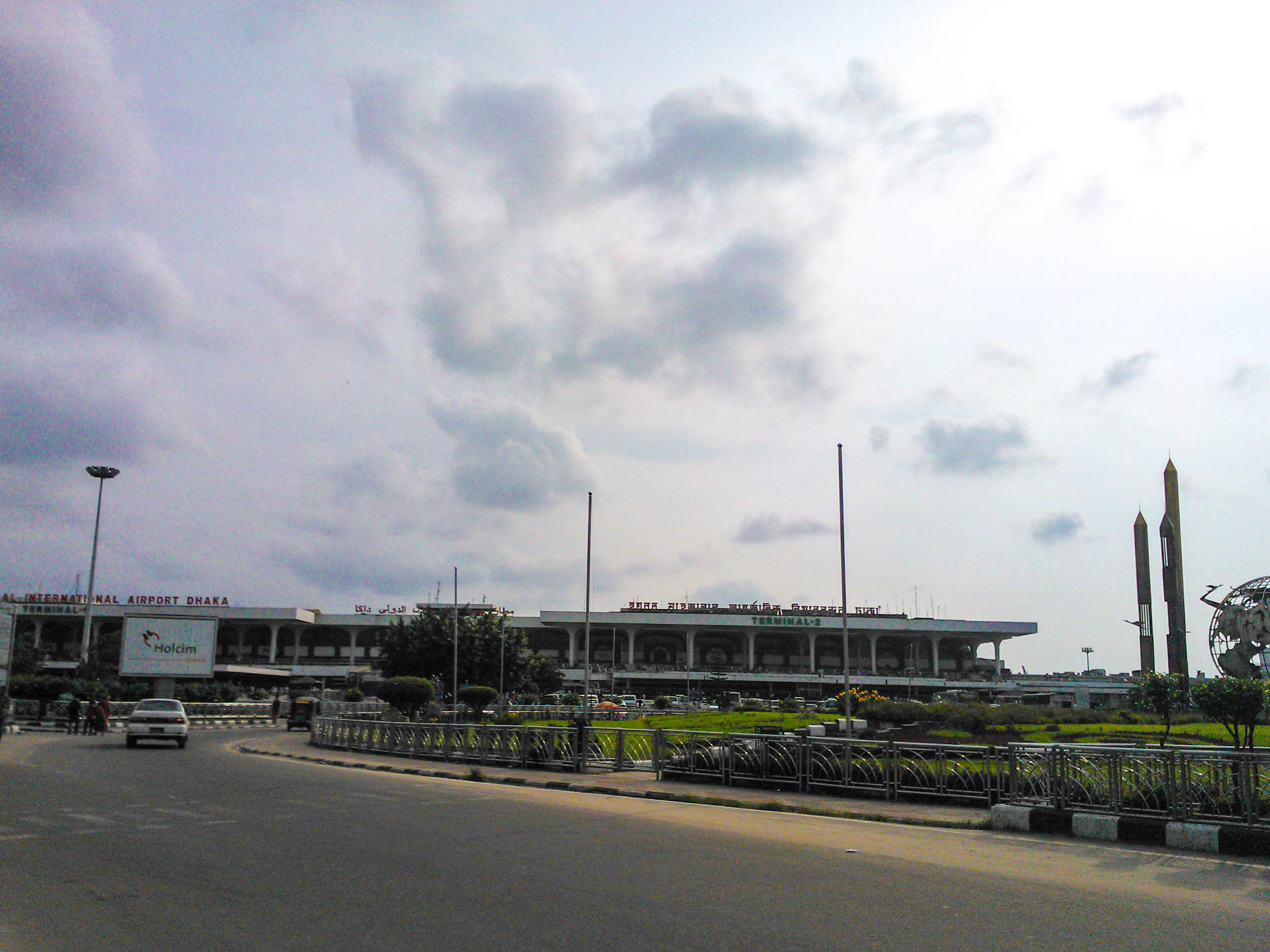
Airport in Dhaka

There is an airport situated in Kurmitola, Dhaka named Shahjalal International Airport. It can be accessed by the eight-lane Airport Road. To the north of the airport lies Uttara area and Gazipur city, while Dhaka city lies to its south. There is a railway station immediately outside (facing) the airport named Airport Railway Station.

== Streets ==
- Ahmed Sofa Sarani
- Sonargaon Janapath
- Jashimuddin Avenue
- Isha Kha Avenue
- Rabindra Sarani
- Gareeb-e-Nawaz Avenue
- Gausul Azam Avenue
- Shah Makhdum Avenue
- Alaul Avenue
- Shayesta Kha Avenue
- Shahjalal Avenue
- Ranabhola Avenue
- Eskaton Avenue

== Public institutions ==
=== Post Office ===
There is a sub-post office situated in Sector 3, with a postal code of 1231.

=== Fire Service ===
There is a fire service and civil defence station in Uttara.

=== Regional Passport Office ===
Uttara has a Regional Passport Office (RPO) situated in Sector 12.

=== Thanas ===
The neighbourhood of Uttara has six thanas (police precincts):

- Uttara East Thana
- Uttara West Thana
- Turag Thana
- Airport Thana
- Uttar Khan Thana
- Dhakshinkhan Thana

=== Hospitals ===
- Aichi Hospital
- Al Ashraf General Hospital
- Kuwait Bangladesh Friendship Government Hospital
- Radical Hospital
- Shin Shin Japan Hospital
- Uttara Adhunik Medical College & Hospital
- Japan East West Medical College Hospital
- Women and Children's Hospital, Uttara
- Ahsania Mission Cancer & General Hospital

== Education ==
=== Schools ===
- Aga Khan School, Dhaka
- Armed Police Battalion High School Uttara Dhaka
- Azampur Government Primary School
- Bangladesh International Tutorial (BIT)
- Belmont International School
- Blooming Flower School
- Child Plan School
- Daffodil International School
- Daffodil College Uttara (DCU)
- Don Bosco School and College
- Glenrich International School, Uttara
- Euro International School
- Green Lawn School and College
- Heritage International College
- International Turkish Hope School, Dhaka
- Kids Campus School
- Life Preparatory School
- MaHaad International School
- Mastermind School
- Mileshium School
- Milestone College
- Moajjem Hossain Ideal School & College
- Nawab Habibullah Model School & College
- Oxford International School, Uttara campus
- Peace International School (PIS)
- Premier School Dhaka (PSD)
- Rangon Academy
- Rajuk Uttara Model College (RUMC)
- Rangon Art School
- Red Brick School
- Scholastica school
- Sky Touch School
- South Breeze School
- Sunbeams School
- Sunnydale
- The Headway School
- Time International Academy
- Uttara High School and College
- Uttara Model College
- Uttara Model School
- Uttara Town College

=== Colleges and universities ===
- Aeronautical Institute of Bangladesh
- Aeronautical College of Bangladesh
- Asian University
- Atish Dipankar University of Science and Technology
- BGMEA Institute of Fashion & Technology
- Daffodil Institute of Science and Technology (DIST)
- Daffodil Nursing College (DNC)
- Heritage International College of Aviation Science and Management
- International University of Business Agriculture and Technology
- Shanto Mariam University of Creative Technology
- Tagore University of Creative Arts
- Uttara University
- World University of Bangladesh

=== Medical colleges ===
- Japan East West Medical College Hospital
- Medical College for Women and Hospital
- Shaheed Monsur Ali Medical College
- Uttara Adhunik Medical College & Hospital

== Tourist attractions ==
- Diabari
- Mugdho Mancha
- Uttara Lake

== Notable residents ==
- Ilias Javed, actor
- Mir Mugdho, freelancer and activist
- S M Jahangir Hossain, politician

== See also ==
- Azampur, Uttara
- Dakshinkhan Union
- House Building, Uttara
- Neighbourhoods in Dhaka Metropolitan Area
