= Ward No. 1 (Dhaka North City Corporation) =

- Dhaka North City Corporation
- Location in Dhaka city
- Coordinates: 23°52′N 90°24.3′E
- Country: Bangladesh
- Division: Dhaka Division
- City: Dhaka
- Parliamentary constituency: Dhaka-18
- Zone: 1

Government
  - Councilor: Afsar Uddin Khan
- Time zone: UTC+6 (Bangladesh Standard Time)
- Post code: 1230
- Telephone code: +880 2

Ward No. 1 Dhaka North City Corporation (Bengali: ওয়ার্ড নং ১, ঢাকা উত্তর সিটি কর্পোরেশন) is an administrative division of Dhaka North City Corporation in zone 1. It's located in Uttara police station of Dhaka City. It forms a city corporation council electoral constituency and is a part of Bangladesh Jatiyo Sangshad constituency Dhaka-18.

== Geography ==
The ward covers sectors 1-10 of Uttara Model Town. It is bounded on the north by the Tongi Khal, on the east by the Narayanganj–Bahadurabad Ghat rail line (across which lie wards 47 and 50), on the south by Hazrat Shahjalal International Airport, and on the west by Uttara Lake (across which lies ward 51).

== Election highlights ==
Zone	Old ward	Election	Councillor	Political party	Ref.
	03		Dr. Hafizul Islam Kusum	Bangladesh Nationalist Party	
01		2015	Afsar Uddin Khan	Bangladesh Awami League	
