= Uttara West Thana =

Administrative area of Dhaka, Bangladesh

- Thana
- Location within Dhaka Location within Dhaka division
- Coordinates: 23.875684°N 90.387432°E
- Country: Bangladesh
- Divisions: Dhaka Division
- Districts: Dhaka District
- Elevation: 23 m (75 ft)

Population (2022)
  - Total: 180,510
- Time zone: UTC+6 (BST)
- Post Code: 1230
- Area code: 02

Uttara West Thana (Bengali: উত্তরা পশ্চিম থানা) is a thana of Bangladesh situated in Sector 11 of Uttara, Dhaka.

== History ==
This thana was established on 4 September 2012 to decrease the responsibility of former Uttara Thana (now Uttara East Thana).

Its total area is 8 square kilometres (3.1 sq mi). This thana is formed by Abdullahpur, Bawnia, Kamarpara, Batulia, Roashdia and Sector 3, 5, 7, 9, 10, 11, 12, 13, 14 of the town.

After establishment of the new thana, the government rented a building as there was no land to construct a police station building for the area. But as the building is located inside a residential area of the thana, the new police station building is inadequate, causing difficulties in the operation of the police station. Besides, traffic jams are created around the police station building. For this, the Uttara Welfare Society protested in 2022 demanding the construction of a new building on 30 katha land in Sonargaon Janapath and shifting it there. Mohammad Habib Hasan, Jatiya Sangsad member of Dhaka-18 constituency, sent a DO letter to the then Capital Development Authority chairman Anisur Rahman Miah on 19 October 2022, recommending in favor of the demand.

Several hundred individuals attacked Uttara West Police Station on 3 June 2025 after three students were detained on extortion charges. The detainees were reportedly linked to a case filed at Uttara East Police Station, prompting the protest led by members of the Students Against Discrimination platform. Protesters hurled bricks at the station in an attempt to free the detainees, while police held a meeting with student representatives to defuse tensions. The police officer who detained the students was closed as a result.

== Demographics ==
Religions in Uttra Pashchim Thana (2022)
Religion	Percent
Islam	95.32%
Hinduism	3.96%
Christianity	0.41%
Other or not stated	0.31%

According to the 2022 Bangladeshi census, Uttra Pashchim Thana had 50,484 households and a population of 180,510. 5.36% of the population were under 5 years of age. Uttra Pashchim had a literacy rate (age 7 and over) of 93.49%: 94.63% for males and 92.07% for females, and a sex ratio of 123.33 males for every 100 females.

== See also ==
- List of districts and suburbs of Dhaka
