= RUAP =

- Housing estate
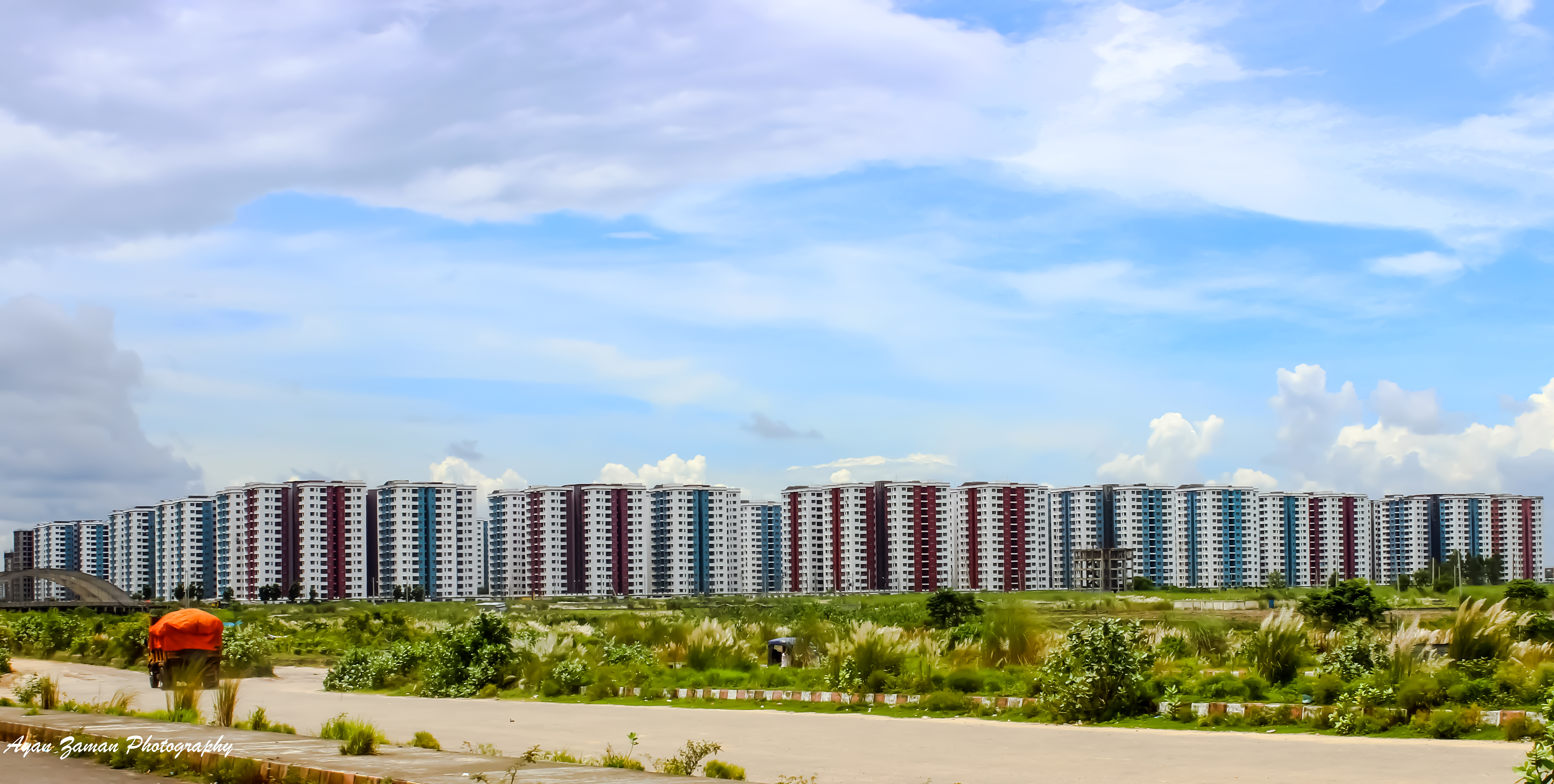
- The area in 2020
- Interactive map of RUAP
- Coordinates: 23.857115°N 90.3503531°E
- Country: Bangladesh
- City: Dhaka
- Suburb: Uttara
- Established: 2011
- Founder: Rajdhani Unnayan Kartripakkha

Government
  - Type: City corporation
  - Body: Dhaka North

RAJUK Uttara Apartment Project (abbreviated as RUAP) is a residential area located in Sector 18 of Uttara, Dhaka, Bangladesh.

== Development ==
It is the first and largest apartment project in the country. Rajdhani Unnayan Kartripakkha launched this project in 2011 to ensure housing in the metropolis for low and middle-income people, targeting an estimated population of 80,000, with a completion period of five years. The construction project included 240 sixteen-storey buildings on 214 acres land, with a total of 18,732 apartments. The buildings were divided into three blocks. In 2019, the project period was extended to 2022, with a final budget of ৳10,586 crore. As of 2021, about 2,000 families were living there. In November 2020, it was revealed that 281 apartments of the project had been allocated through lobbying and bribes instead of a lottery system.

After the launch of MRT Line 6 in 2022, the demand for apartments in the project area increased. It was reported that 450 apartments of the project were still unsold. In 2024, the construction progress of Block A of the project reportedly reached 95%, and the authorities were expected to complete the construction by December of the same year. Later, the project duration was extended to June 2025.

== Construction ==
Although construction of 79 buildings in Block A was completed under the project, the Cabinet Committee on Government Purchase cancelled the plan to build buildings of the B and C block with financial and technical assistance from the Malaysian government. As a result, the Project Implementation Committee and Project Steering Committee decided to create separate projects for Blocks B and C. Consequently, Rajdhani Unnayan Kartripakkha proposed a new project with a budget of ৳16,827 crore to construct 7,544 apartments in two blocks with a target completion year of 2030.

However, since no feasibility study had been conducted as required for a project worth more than ৳50 crore, objections were raised about the project at a meeting of the Project Evaluation Committee in June 2025. In November 2025, its central library was inaugurated.
