= Mirpur DOHS =

Neighborhood in Dhaka, Bangladesh

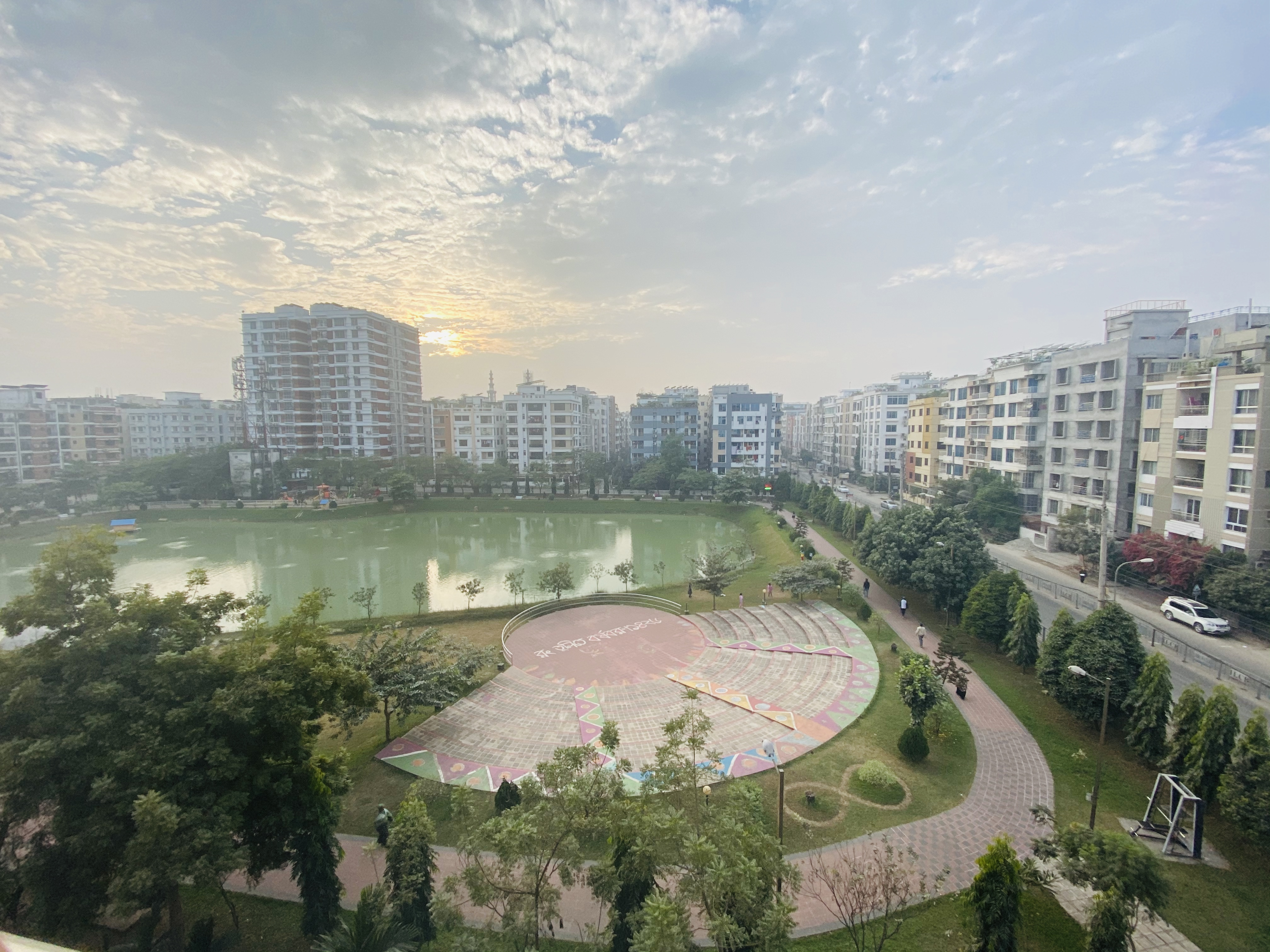
- Mirpur DOHS
- Interactive map of Mirpur DOHS
- Coordinates: 23°50′13″N 90°22′12.1″E
- Time zone: BST

Mirpur DOHS is a neighbourhood of Dhaka North, situated in Mirpur Thana of Dhaka City, Bangladesh. The area is under the jurisdiction of Pallabi Thana Police Station.

The area is administered by Cantonment Board, Dhaka. It has one military operated public school Mirpur Cantonment Public School and College

The neighbourhood is located close to Mirpur Cantonment. The Postal Code for Mirpur DOHS is 1216.

== History ==
The area is governed by Mirpur DOHS (Defence Officers' Housing Scheme) parishad. It is the largest in the country with a total of 1290 individual lots. The Government of Bangladesh allocated 37 lots to the relatives of 37 officers killed in the 2009 Bangladesh Rifles Mutiny and an additional 20 apartments were allocated to ten families, 2 each. In 2015, Bangladesh Police busted a human trafficking ring based in Mirpur DOHS, rescuing 46 victims. Mirpur DOHS Porishod is the Security Force of Mirpur DOHS, it has about a few hundred members.

== Notable Places ==
- Sarkar Bari Mosque
- Mirpur DOHS Central Mosque
- Mirpur Cantonment
- Bangladesh University of Professionals (BUP)
- Mirpur DOHS Mosque No. 3
- Mirpur DOHS Mosque No. 4
- Mirpur DOHS Shopping Complex
- Mirpur Cantonment Public School and College (MCPSC)
- Military Institute of Science and Technology (MIST)
- Metro Rail Station, Pallabi
- Central Play Ground
- Jostna Shorobor
- Children's Park
- Boikali Mirpur DOHS Park
- Cultural Centre
- CSD Mirpur DOHS
- Brain Station 23
- Trust Bank
- CP Five Star
- Saloon Mirpur DOHS CSD
- Starbase Gym
- MES Canteen
- Prantik Park
- Amana Big Bazar - DOHS
- Cafe Obokash
