= Uttara East Thana =

Administrative area of Dhaka, Bangladesh

- Thana
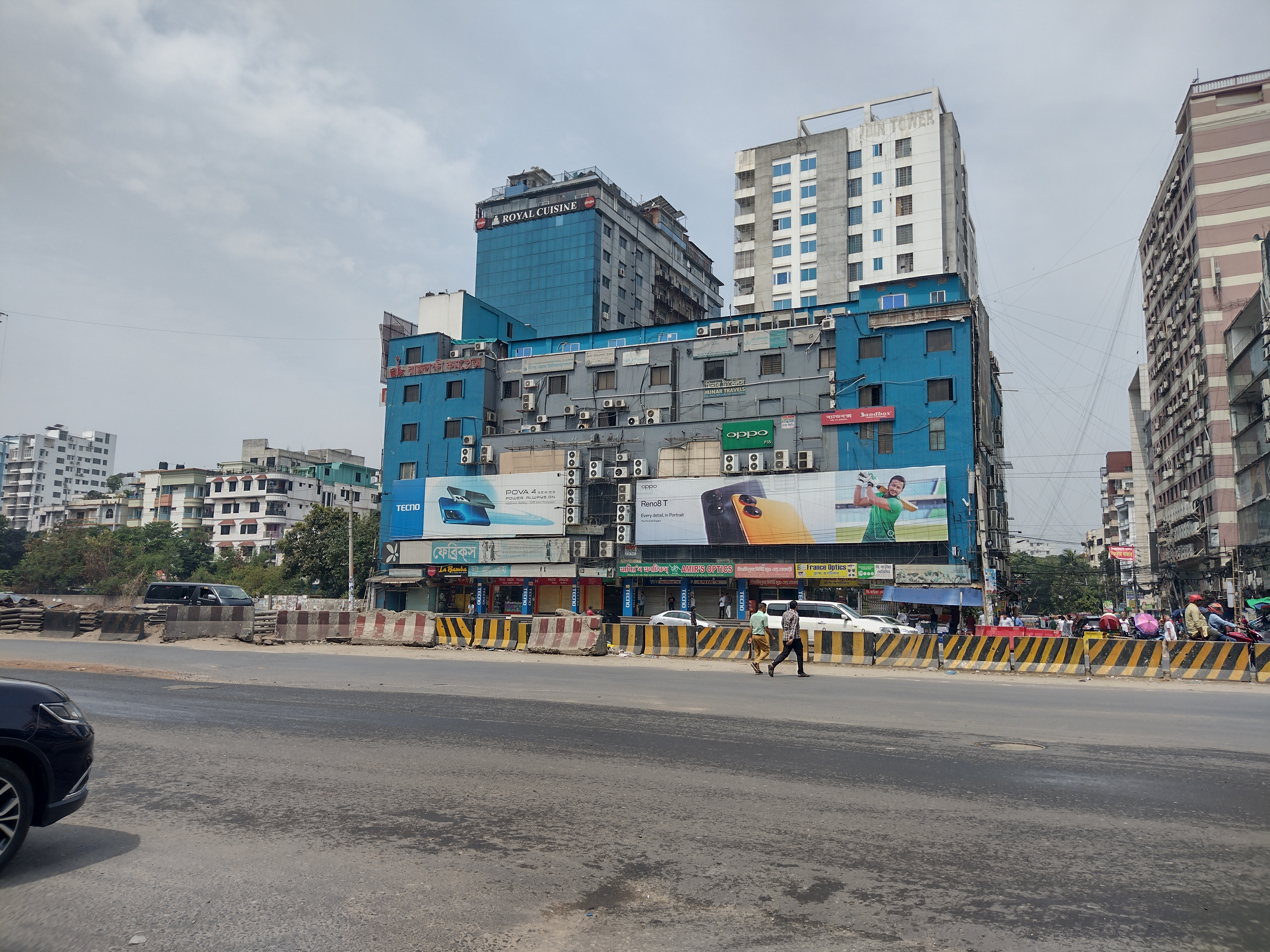
- Rajlokkhi Complex

- Location within Dhaka Location within Dhaka division
- Coordinates: 23.8669°N 90.4005°E
- Country: Bangladesh
- Divisions: Dhaka Division
- Districts: Dhaka District
- Elevation: 23 m (75 ft)

Population (2022)
  - Total: 35,395
- Time zone: UTC+6 (BST)
- Post Code: 1230
- Area code: 02

Uttara East Thana (Bengali: উত্তরা পূর্ব থানা) is a thana of Bangladesh situated in Sector 4 of Uttara, Dhaka (eastern side of Dhaka–Mymensingh Highway).

== History ==
Uttara East was established on 31 May 1997. Its former name was Uttara Thana. The name was changed after a new thana was established, named Uttara West Thana in the western side of Uttara.

This thana is formed by Sector 1, 2, 4, 6 and 8 of the town.

On 5 August 2024, at least 10 people were killed when shots were fired from the Uttara East Police Station during protests in Dhaka. Protesters had earlier attacked an Armoured Personnel Carrier, prompting police to respond with live rounds, rubber bullets, and tear gas. The unrest escalated as the crowd set fire to the station, and an army team failed to extract those still firing from inside. Dhaka experienced violent clashes following Sheikh Hasina's resignation, leaving at least 66 dead and over a thousand injured. Multiple police stations across Dhaka were attacked and set ablaze, including Stations in Uttara East, Jatrabari, Tejgaon, Mohammadpur, Badda, and others were targeted, prompting police to evacuate and abandon many of the city's 50 stations. At Uttara East Police Station, at least 10 people were killed during clashes, with plainclothes officers firing from rooftops as crowds set fires and threw projectiles.

After the fall of the Sheikh Hasina-led Awami League government, Md Mujibur Rahman, a former officer-in-charge of Uttara East police station, was arrested in the Dhaka University area following a warrant issued by the International Crimes Tribunal in February 2025 following a request by Prosecutor Gazi Monawar Hossain Tamim. He is one of seven individuals, including two police officers, accused of crimes against humanity during the mass uprising in Mohakhali, Rampura, and Uttara. Mujibur had been transferred from his position in August 2024 and is currently in tribunal custody. Another officer Sub-inspector Shah Alam, former OC of Uttara East Police Station, escaped from custody a day after his arrest in connection with a murder case linked to the July Uprising. He had joined the station as OC on 1 August 2024, just days before the Awami League government was ousted.

== Demographics ==
Religions in Uttara Purba Thana (2022)
Religion	Percent
Islam	95.35%
Hinduism	3.91%
Christianity	0.41%
Other or not stated	0.33%

According to the 2022 Bangladeshi census, Uttara Purba Thana had 8,794 households and a population of 35,395. 4.43% of the population were under 5 years of age. Uttara Purba had a literacy rate (age 7 and over) of 94.19%: 95.89% for males and 92.05% for females, and a sex ratio of 124.86 males for every 100 females.

== See also ==
- List of districts and suburbs of Dhaka
- Thanas of Bangladesh
- Administrative geography of Bangladesh
- Villages of Bangladesh
- Gram Police Bahini
