= Jhilmil =

Residential Neighbourhood in Keraniganj, Dhaka, Bangladesh

Coordinates: 23.679°N 90.400°E

Jhilmil Residential Area is a residential housing project developed in Keraniganj Upazila by Rajdhani Unnayan Kartripakkha (Capital Development Authority) as a suburb of Dhaka.

== History ==
The project was founded in 1997, adjacent to the Dhaka-Mawa Highway in Keraniganj. It has a total of 1,635 plots for housing, and Rajdhani Unnayan Kartripakkha plans to build 12,000 apartments. After the fall of the Sheikh Hasina-led Awami League government, the contract with BNG Global Holdings and Consortium, signed in 2017, to construct 14,000 residential apartments was cancelled. The decision was taken by Finance Minister Amir Khasru Mahmud Chowdhury.

The proposed Mass Rapid Transit will include a station for line 1. The project has been included in a future ring road around Dhaka. The project is smaller than other Rajuk housing projects.
