= Sunbeams School =

Private school in Bangladesh

Information
- Established: 15 January 1974; 52 years ago
- Classes: Playgroup - Class 12
- Enrollment: c.2,000 - 3,000 (2010)
- Language: English

Sunbeams School is a private English medium school in Dhaka, Bangladesh. It was founded by Principal Niloufer Manzur on 15 January 1974. As of 2010, it had an enrollment of between 2,000 and 3,000.

Until 1994 the school provided education through Grade 5, but Sunbeams is now running IAL (International Advanced Level) exams as well. The school's mascot is the Rising Sun with seven beams.

Sunbeams school has two campuses, one is located in the residential area of Dhanmondi and conducts classes from Playgroup to Class 4. The other campus is located in Uttara and has classes from Playgroup to Class 12.

Sunbeams has two branches:

- Junior section, in Dhanmondi Road 27 - Playgroup, Nursery, KG-1, KG-2, Class-1, Class-2, Class-3 and Class-4
- Uttara campus, in Sector 10, Uttara - Playgroup, Nursery, KG-1, KG-2, Class-1, Class-2, Class-3, Class-4, Class-5, Class-6, Class-7, Class-8, Class-9, Class-10, 'O' Levels and 'A' Levels.

The Uttara campus is the main campus, containing the Senior Section and administrative buildings. It is the larger of the two campuses, built in 2008, and consists of one building and one football field and both an indoor and outdoor basketball court. The Uttara campus has a canteen, an auditorium, a biology/physics laboratory, a chemistry lab and many other things which the junior (Dhanmondi) campus does not.
