= International Hope School Bangladesh =

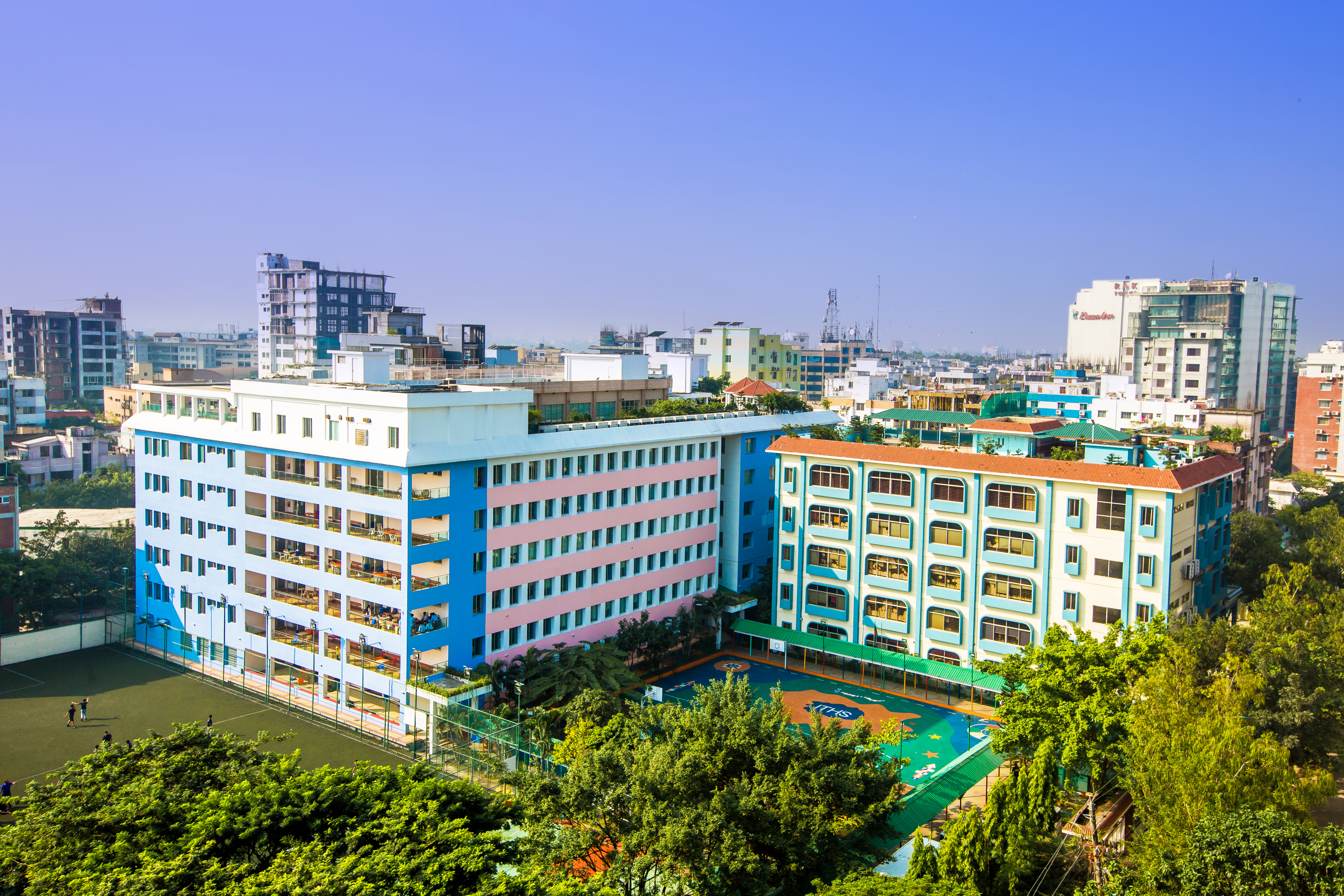
- International Hope School Bangladesh, Dhaka

Location
- Uttara, Dhaka; Bangladesh
- Coordinates: 23.8647°N 90.3938°E

Information
- Former name: International Turkish Hope School
- Type: Private international school
- Established: 1996; 30 years ago
- Founder: Kazim Eldes
- Chairman: Timothy Donald Fisher
- Principal: Roksana Zarin
- Faculty: 300
- Grades: Playgroup through 12
- Enrollment: 6000 (all campuses, 2025)
- Campus size: 0.81 hectares (2 acres)
- Campus type: Urban
- Colors: Blue and White
- Team name: Hopians
- Website: ihsb.edu.bd

International Hope School Bangladesh (IHSB) is an English medium, private international school in Uttara, Dhaka, Bangladesh. It was previously called International Turkish Hope School.

== History and campus ==
Founder Principal Kazim Eldes established ITHS in Dhaka in 1996. The President of Turkey, Süleyman Demirel, a strong supporter of Turkish schools, officially inaugurated the school while on a state visit in March 1997.

The school started as one campus in rented premises serving a small number of very young students. It has since grown to eight campuses in three cities: two preschools, two junior sections (grades 1–5), and two senior sections (one boys, one girls) in the Gulshan and Uttara areas of Dhaka, a branch in Chittagong that spans from preschool through grade 12, and a preschool and junior section in Bogra. Combined enrollment has risen to over 6000 as of 2025.

ITHS began construction of a purpose-built campus on two acres of land granted by the Bangladesh government, located in Uttara Sector 4, in June 2002. Construction was finished in September 2005. Facilities include an extensive playground, football field, basketball court, conference hall, library, and computer and science lab. There are boys and girls hostels for boarders. The school has six branches in Dhaka. On 21 February 2010, President of Turkey, Adbullah Gul, visited the campus of the school.

Following the 2016 Turkish coup attempt; the Turkish ambassador to Bangladesh claimed the school was affiliated with Gülen movement; which he described as a terrorist organization. Turkish school teachers, the school employed 33 Turkish nationals who claimed they were being denied service by their embassy and one employee reported that the embassy confiscated his passport. The school denied any connections.

The school changed its name in 2018 to International Hope School Bangladesh, after the school had to cut ties with the Turkish. The school changed its logo and almost all Turkish teachers and students had to leave. The school came in the ownership of International Hope Limited.

In 2024, IHSB was bought by starling education. Timothy Donald Fisher was installed as chairman.

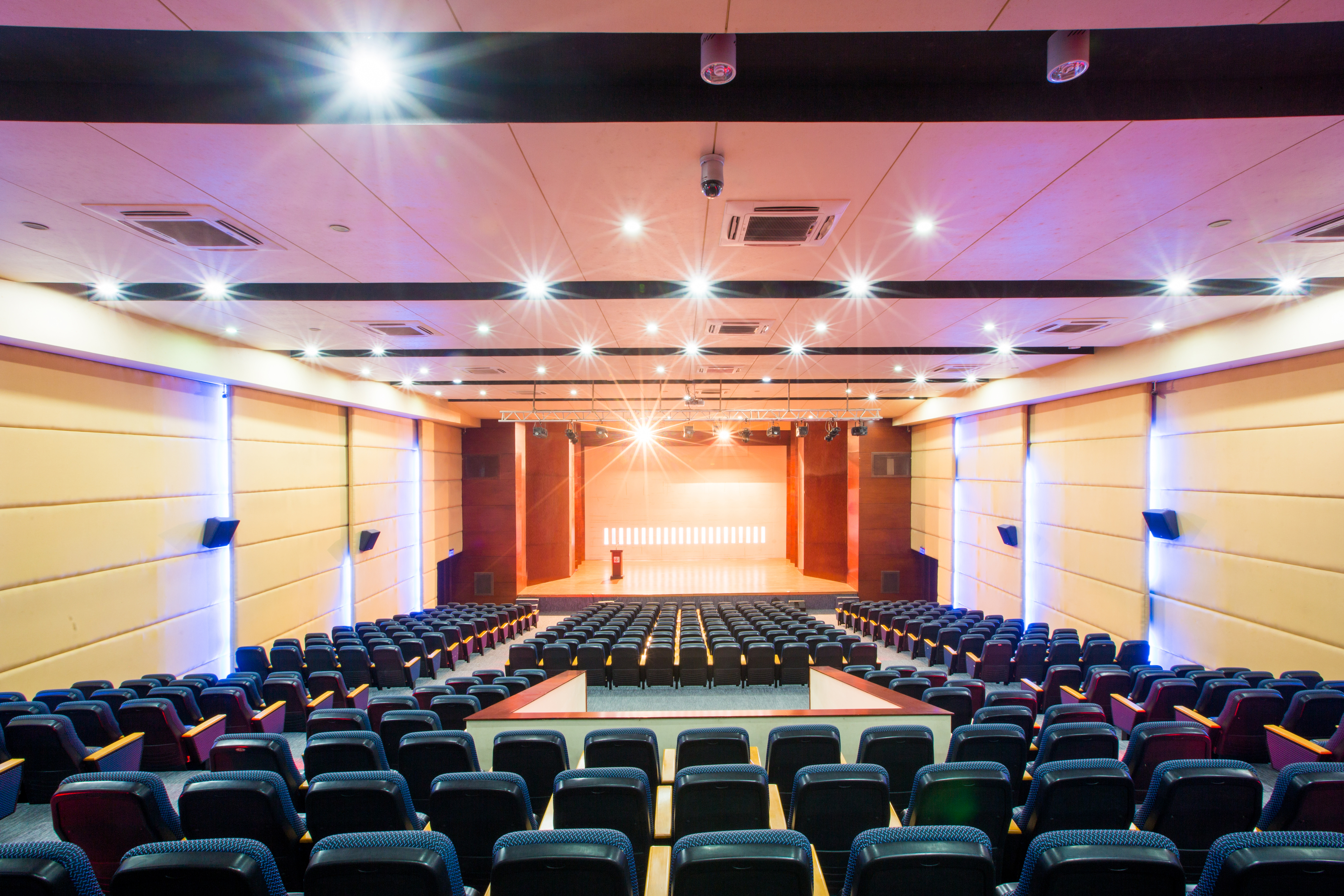
Auditorium of International Hope School Bangladesh (IHSB)

== Curriculum ==
IHSB is an English medium school having classes from Toddler through higher secondary level. The school follows the Cambridge IGCSE and GCE system and prepares the students for O-level and A-level examinations. English is taught from an early age. The British Council has partnered with the school since May 2015, teaching English language reading and writing skills to children between 11 and 13 years old at the Uttara campus. Bengali language classes are compulsory for students with Bangladeshi roots. Religious studies classes are compulsory for Muslim students.

== Students ==
There are about 2000 students. 17% of the students are from countries outside Bangladesh, including Malaysia, Canada, Philippines, USA, UK, Saudi Arabia, Sudan, Scotland, Egypt, Pakistan, Yemen, Iraq, China, Italy, Spain, Japan, Germany, Australia, Taiwan, India, Sri Lanka and Turkey.

== See also ==
- List of international schools in Bangladesh
