= Azampur =

Azampur আজমপুর
- Area of Uttara
- Location in Azampur, Dhaka, Bangladesh
- Coordinates: 23°52.1′N 90°23.1′E
- Country: Bangladesh
- Division: Dhaka Division
- District: Dhaka District
- Elevation: 23 m (75 ft)
- Time zone: UTC+6 (BST)
- Postal code: 1230

Azampur (Bengali: আজমপুর) is an area of Uttara, a suburb of Dhaka, Bangladesh. There is a bus stop in the same name.

== See also ==
- House Building, Uttara
