= Rupayan City =

Rupayan City Uttara, satellite township

Coordinates: 23.8765°N 90.3795°E

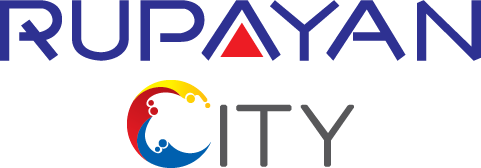

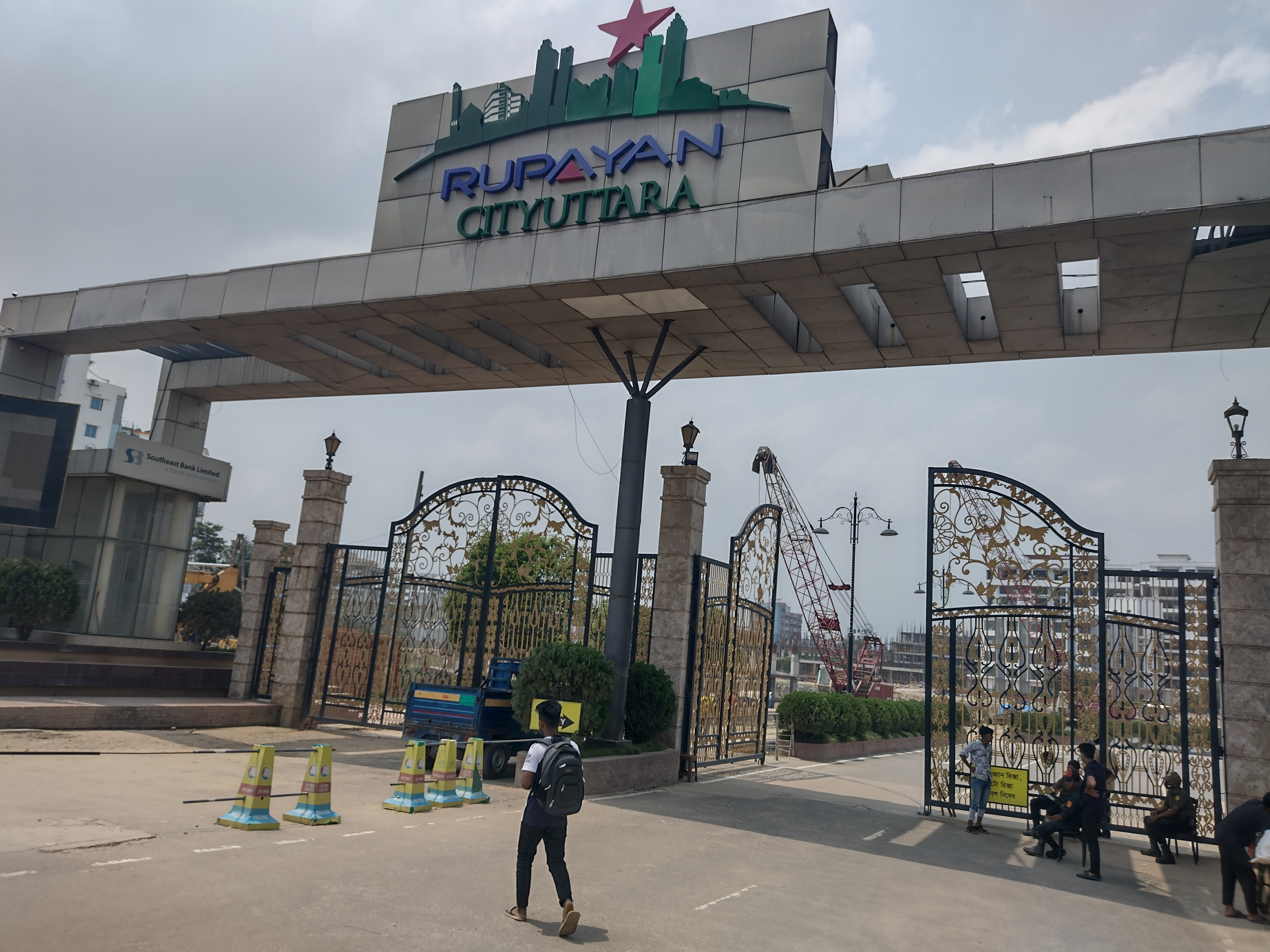
- Gate of Rupayan City
- Industry: Real Estate
- Founded: 2014
- Headquarters: Dhaka, Bangladesh.
- Key people: Mahir Ali Khan Ratul (Co-Chairman of Rupayan Group)
- Brands: Rupayan
- Website: www.rupayancity.com

Rupayan City, is Bangladesh's first mega gated community project located in Sector 12, Uttara Model Town, Dhaka by Rupayan Group.

== Project ==
The land area of Rupayan City Uttara is 134.5 bighas (81 acres). Apartments sizes are between 1980 sft to 7353 sft.

It has residential apartments, shopping malls, schools, mosques and office spaces. The project has 4 phase: 3 residential and 1 commercial. 2 of the residential phases Majestic & Grand are the CONDO phase, and SkyVilla is the villa & Penthouse. The project consists of 63% open space.
