= Turag Thana =

Administrative area of Dhaka, Bangladesh

Turag Thana তুরাগ থানা
- Thana
- Expandable map of vicinity of Turag Thana
- Location of Turag Thana within Dhaka Location of Turag Thana within Dhaka Division Location of Turag Thana within Bangladesh
- Coordinates: 23.87648°N 90.35465°E
- Country: Bangladesh
- Division: Dhaka Division
- District: Dhaka District
- Established as a thana: 2005

Area
  - Total: 12.17 km^{2} (4.70 sq mi)
- Elevation: 23 m (75 ft)

Population (2022)
  - Total: 266,054
  - Density: 12,927/km^{2} (33,480/sq mi)
- Time zone: UTC+6 (BST)
- Postal code: 1230
- Area code: 02

Turag Thana is a thana, an administrative unit, in Dhaka City, Bangladesh. Turag Thana police station is the designated police station of the thana.

== Geography ==
Turag Thana is bounded by Gazipur Sadar Upazila on the north, Pallabi Thana on the south, Gazipur Sadar Upazila and Uttara Thana on the east and Savar Upazila on the west. The thana occupies total land area of 12.17 square kilometres (4.70 mi^{2}).

== Demographics ==
Religions in Turag Thana (2022)
Religion	Percent
Islam	96.20%
Hinduism	3.50%
Other or not stated	0.30%

According to the 2022 Bangladeshi census, Turag Thana had 77,202 households and a population of 266,064. 8.44% of the population were under 5 years of age. Turag had a literacy rate (age 7 and over) of 82.16%: 84.19% for males and 79.69% for females, and a sex ratio of 119.30 males for every 100 females.

According to 2011 Census of Bangladesh, Turag Thana has a population of 157,316 with average household size of 4.1 members, and an average literacy rate of 63.5% vs national average of 51.8% literacy.
