= Sonargaon Janapath =

Street in Dhaka

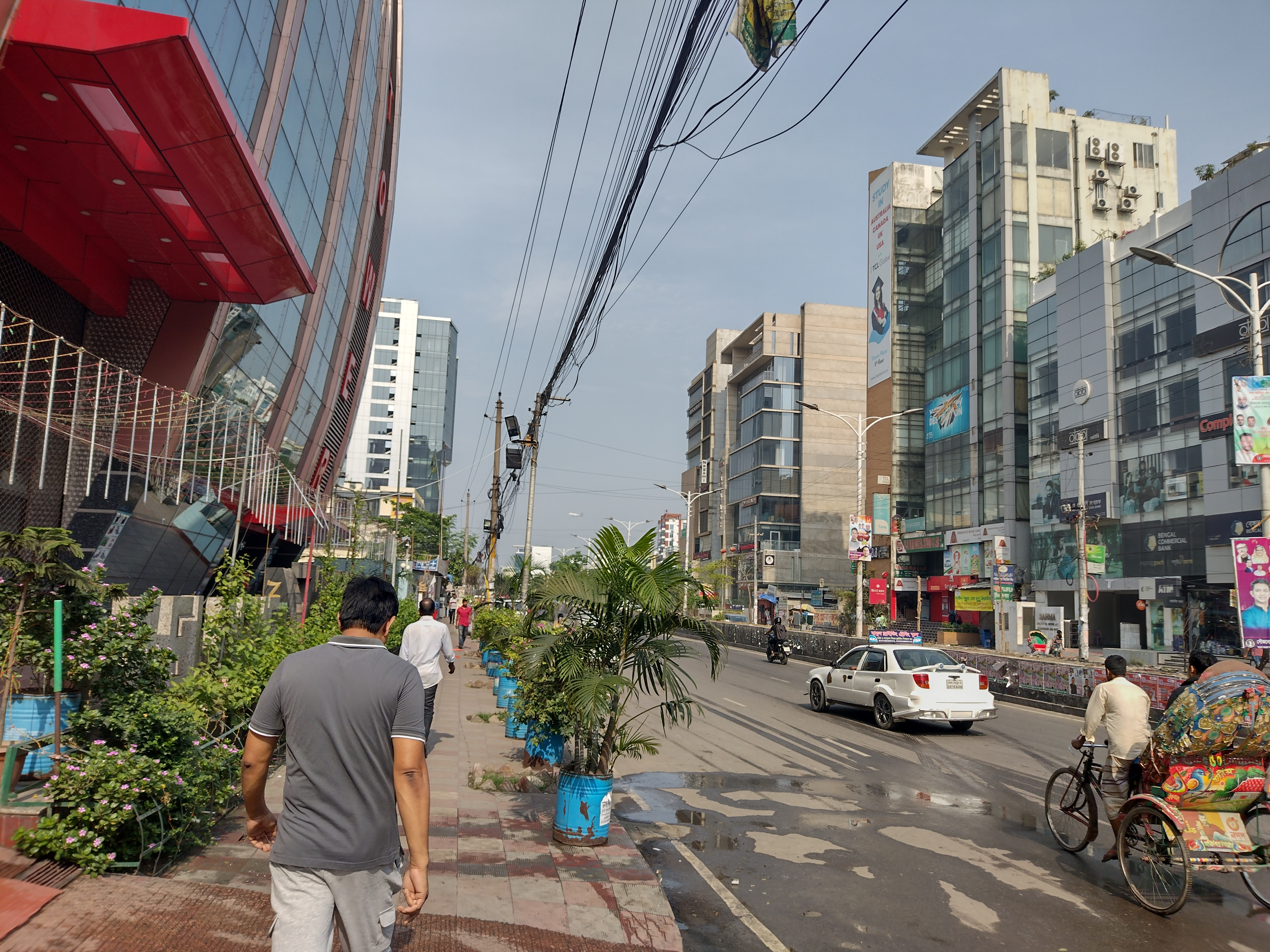
- Sonargaon Janapath from Sector 11 intersection
- Native name: সোনারগাঁও জনপথ (Bengali)
- Type: Street
- Maintained by: Dhaka North City Corporation
- Location: Uttara, Dhaka, Bangladesh
- Postal code: 1230
- Nearest metro station: Uttara North
- Coordinates: 23.8742445°N 90.3845983°E
- Major junctions: House Building; Sector 11 intersection; Khalpar; Diabari circle; Diabari checkpost
- East: Airport Road
- West: Mirpur Road

Other
- Status: Active

Sonargaon Janapath is a street that joins House Building with Ashulia embankment situated in Uttara, Dhaka. It is a four-lane street.

This road passes between Sectors 8, 9, 11, 13 and 12 (Note: Although this two references are contradictory with each other but if one use google map with references then they will be able to get a clear idea about location of the road.) and merges with Mirpur Road in the west through Ahmed Sofa Sarani. Its Sector 11 intersection is said to be the gateway to the growing area in the west of Uttara.

Due to illegal encroachment from Sector 11 intersection to rubbish's intersection, the street has become narrow, causing difficulty in movement of vehicles and pedestrians.

In 2019, the Dhaka North City Corporation authority conducted an official eviction drive on the road.

In January 2020, before the mayoral election, Dhaka North's incumbent mayor Atiqul Islam promised to open the street for 3 hours in the morning every Friday for children to play.
