= Pallabi =

Pallabi may refer to:

- Pallabi Munsi Indian investigative reporter
- Pallabi Thana a district sub-unit in Bangladesh

== See also ==
- Pallavi (disambiguation)
