= Shaheed Monsur Ali Medical College =

Private medical college in Dhaka, Bangladesh

Shaheed Monsur Ali Medical College, Dhaka
- শহীদ মনসুর আলী মেডিকেল কলেজ, ঢাকা
- Other names: SMAMCH
- Former names: Ummah Medical College; Moulana Bhasani Medical College
- Type: Non-government medical college
- Parent institution: Shaheed Monsur Ali Trust
- Affiliations: Dhaka University; BMDC; WHO (IMED-FAIMER)
- Chairman: Tomal Monsur
- Principal: Prof. Dr. Colonel (Retd.) Md. Abdul Hamid
- Students: 700
- Location: 26 & 26A, Road # 10, Sector # 11, Uttara Model Town, Dhaka, 1230, Bangladesh
- Campus: Urban 3 acres (1.2 ha)
- Language: English
- Website: smamedicalcollege-bd.com

Shaheed Monsur Ali Medical College, Dhaka (SMAMC) (Bengali: শহীদ মনসুর আলী মেডিকেল কলেজ, ঢাকা) is a private medical college in Uttara, Dhaka, the capital of Bangladesh. It is affiliated with the University of Dhaka.

It offers a five-year course of study leading to a Bachelor of Medicine, Bachelor of Surgery (MBBS) degree. A one-year internship after graduation is compulsory for all the graduates. The degree is recognised by the Bangladesh Medical and Dental Council.

== History ==
The college was established as the Ummah Medical College in 1994–95 in Mirpur, Dhaka. It later shifted to its present site in 1998 under the current name Shaheed Monsur Ali Medical College and Hospital. It is named after Shaheed M. Mansur Ali, the 3rd prime minister of Bangladesh, and as the finance minister of the Mujibnagar Government he was a leader of Bangladesh's 1971 Liberation War as well. It was renamed in 2002 as the Moulana Bhasani Medical College under the Moulana Bhasani Trust. In October 2007, the college shifted to its own building, which was inaugurated by the ex-chairman of the Moulana Bhasani Trust. In February 2009, Jamal Uddin Chowdhury was elected as chairman of the Moulana Bhasani Trust, later Mrs. Laila Arjumand was elected as chairman of Moulana Bhasani Trust and Jamal Uddin Chowdhury was elected as chairman of Shaheed Monsur Ali Medical College. The institution was renamed to its current name of Shaheed Monsur Ali Medical College on April 3, 2010, in the presence of the chairman of the Moulana Bhasani Trust Mrs.Laila Arjumand.

== Campus ==
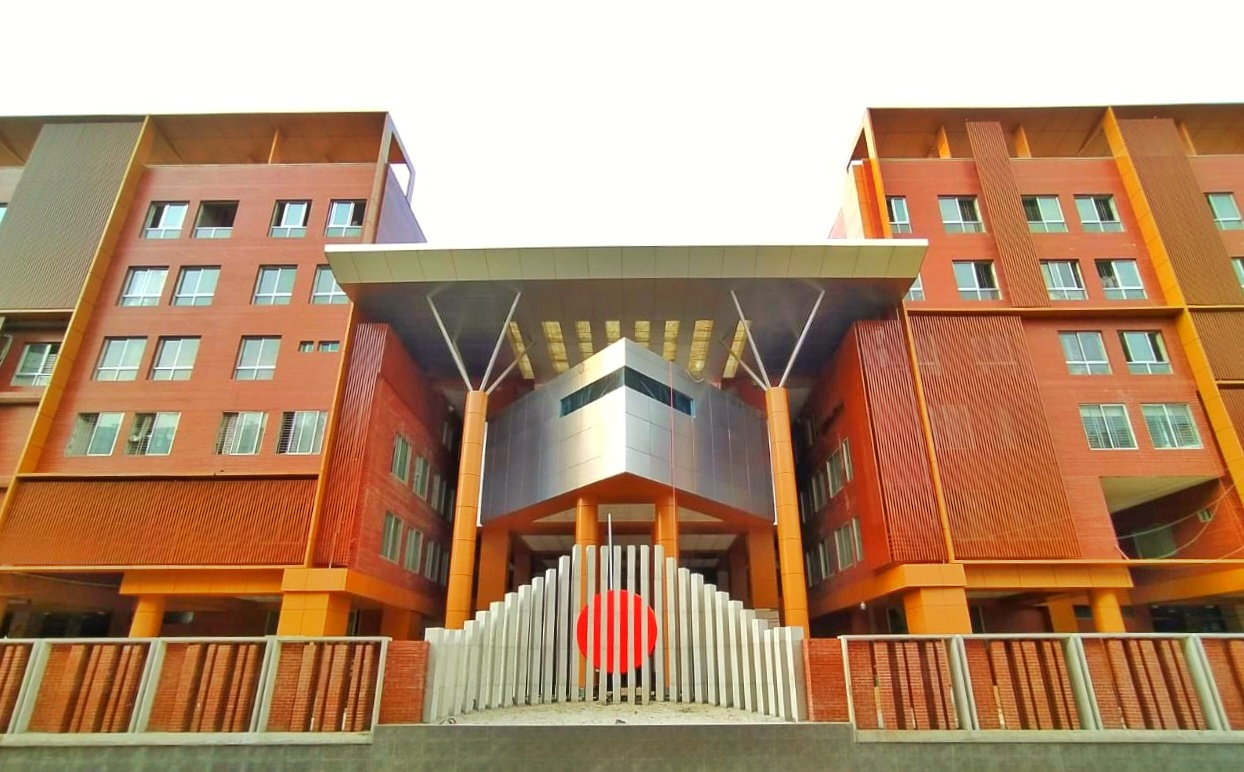
SMAMCH Campus

Shaheed Monsur Ali Medical College's main campus in Uttara Model Town covers 3 acres (1.2 ha). The academic building of the college is built on its own land having spacious classrooms, lecture galleries, practical classrooms, departmental museums, library, reading rooms etc. It also accommodates a cafeteria and separate common rooms for male and female students having facilities for indoor games. There are separate hostels for boys and girls. Students have facilities for outdoor games also. The entire library is covered by high speed WIFI internet. The river 'Turag' flows beside the campus of the college adding an unlimited fervor to the scenic beauty. It has a 750-bedded hospital with all modern amenities offering emergency, outdoor and indoor services round the clock.

The college was approved by the government of Bangladesh. It is affiliated with Dhaka University, and enjoys the recognition of the Bangladesh Medical and Dental Council (BMDC) as well as the World Health Organization (WHO). The college also has the recognition of postgraduate training in various subjects in the college hospital by the Bangladesh College of Physicians and Surgeons (BCPS).

=== Location ===
The college conglomerate offers medical education, medical research, health care services and nursing education. This Medical College Hospital is situated at sector no. 11, of Uttara. The Turag River flows beside the campus of the college. The college's address is Plot # 26 & 26/A, Road #10, Sector #11, Uttara Model Town, Uttara, Dhaka-1230

== Academics ==
The main course offered is the Bachelor of Medicine and Bachelor of Surgery MBBS for 5 years of study. The college follows the curriculum approved by the Dhaka University and Bangladesh Medical and Dental Council. The courses within are divided into the following subtopics:

- Pre-clinical subjects: Anatomy, Physiology and Biochemistry, Histology, Embryology.
- Pre-clinical subjects: Community medicine, Forensic medicine, Pharmacology, Pathology and Microbiology.
- Clinical Subjects: Obstetrics and Gynecology Medicine, Surgery and other related subjects.
- Basic medical subjects-Anatomy, Physiology, Biochemistry, Forensic Medicine, Community Medicine, Pathology, Microbiology, Pharmacology
- Clinical subjects-Medicine including Psychiatry and Dermatology, Surgery including Ophthalmology and Otolaryngology and Gynecology and Obstetrics

The college has admitted 29 batches of students since its inception. 23 batches of students have completed their MBBS course. The hospital is pl situated just beside the college building.

== Co-curricular Activities ==
The medical college annually organizes a Cultural Week, debate competitions, and an inter-class sports event, with active participation from its students. In addition, students and physicians of the institution observe various national and international awareness days and engage in a range of social welfare activities.

In 2024, a group of students and Intern doctors from the medical college established a social welfare organization named "Shopner Desh Foundation". The organization operates under the slogan 'The country is ours, and the responsibility is ours,' and conducts social service activities in different parts of Bangladesh.

During the floods of 2024, the foundation carried out relief operations in Feni and Sherpur, distributing emergency supplies, providing financial assistance for housing rehabilitation, and organizing free medical camps with medicine distribution. The foundation also conducts regular winter clothing distribution programs in underprivileged areas, organizes free medical camps to support healthcare access for disadvantaged populations, provides financial assistance to those in need, delivers health and hygiene awareness programs in educational institutions, and distributes copies of the Holy Qur’an to madrasahs.

== See also ==
- List of medical colleges in Bangladesh
- List of hospitals in Bangladesh
