= Rajdhani Unnayan Kartripakkha =

Public agency in Bangladesh

Coordinates: 23°43′34″N 90°24′56″E

- Capital Development Authority রাজধানী উন্নয়ন কর্তৃপক্ষ
- Logo of RAJUK

Agency overview
- Formed: 1956; 70 years ago
- Superseding agency: Dhaka Improvement Trust
- Jurisdiction: Dhaka
- Headquarters: RAJUK Bhaban, Rajuk Avenue, Motijheel, Dhaka-1000
- Agency executive: Md. Riazul Islam, Chairman
- Parent agency: Ministry of Housing and Public Works
- Key documents: The Town Improvement Act, 1953 (East Pakistan Act No. XIII of 1953); Rajdhani Unnayan Kartripakkha Act, 2026 (Act No. 67 of 2026)
- Website: rajuk.gov.bd

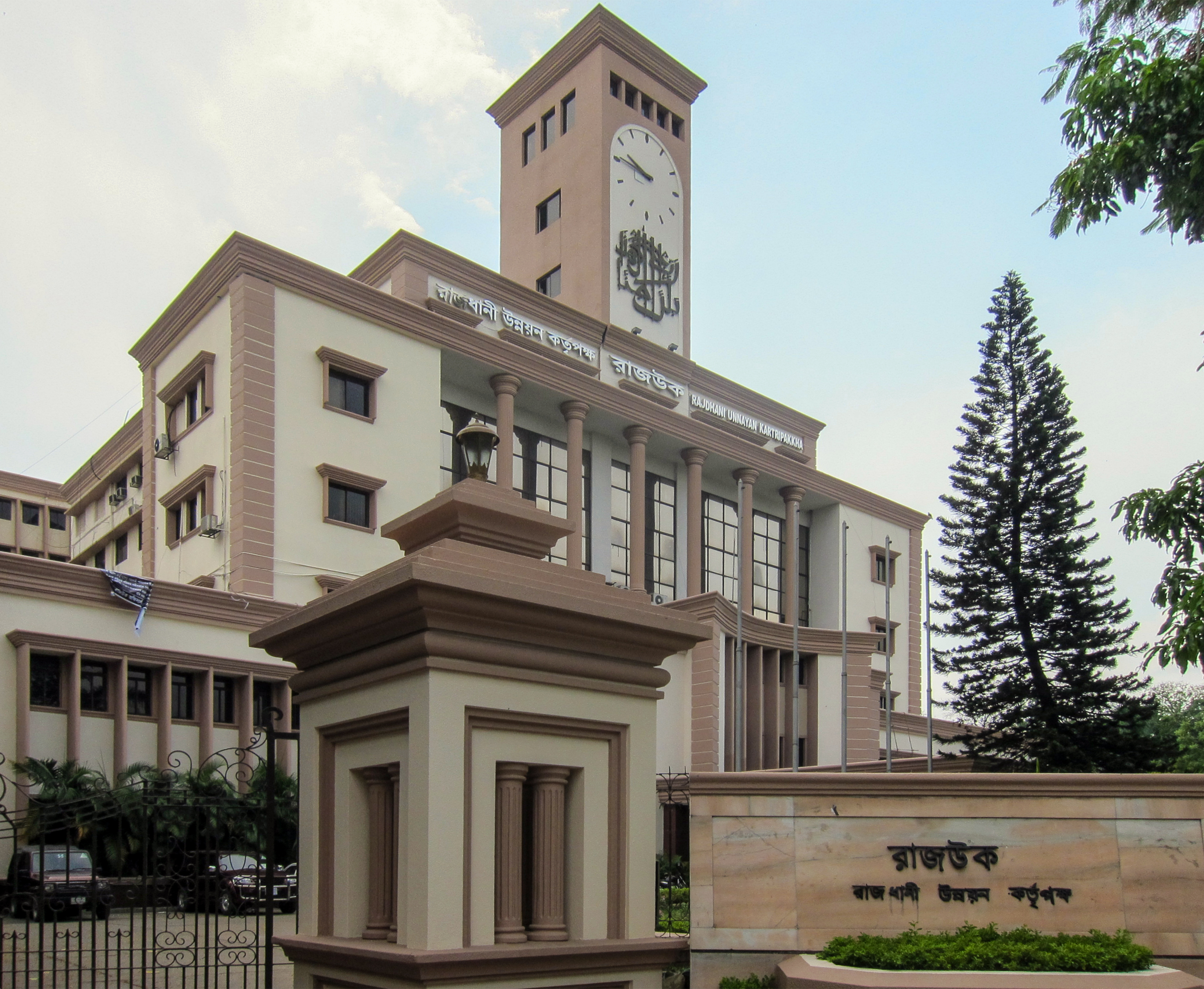
RAJUK Bhaban

Rajdhani Unnayan Kartripakkha (Bengali: রাজধানী উন্নয়ন কর্তৃপক্ষ, romanized: Rājdhānī Unnôẏôn Kôrtroppôkkhô; abbreviated as RAJUK) (lit.: Capital Development Authority) is a Bangladesh government urban planning authority responsible for the planned development, regulation, and management of Dhaka, Bangladesh. Established in 1956, RAJUK oversees urban growth, land use planning, zoning regulations, building approvals, and infrastructure development in the capital city. The authority is responsible for preparing and implementing comprehensive master plans, which are periodically reviewed to guide long-term urban development and sustainable city planning. It operates under the Ministry of Housing and Public Works.

== History ==
The Dhaka Improvement Trust (DIT) was established in 1956 under the Town Development Act of 1953 (East Bengal Act), tasked with executing development projects for Dhaka, Narayanganj, and surrounding areas. Its administrative framework consisted of a 13-member board of trustees.

In 1959, the DIT sanctioned the first master plan for Dhaka following the British colonial period. Initially covering an area of 220 square miles (570 km^{2}), the plan, formulated by British planners Minoprio, Spencely, and MacFarlane, was later expanded to 320 square miles (830 km^{2}). The primary aim of the 1959 Master Plan was to offer a comprehensive strategy for managing the anticipated rapid population growth of Dhaka. However, it fell short of its goals, as the population surpassed the planning targets by threefold.

The rapid urbanisation of Dhaka and its surroundings in the 1970s and '80s posed significant development challenges. To address these, amendments were made to the administrative and legal structure of the DIT. The Town Improvement (Amendment) Act of 1987 resulted in the transformation of the DIT into the Rajdhani Unnayan Kartripakkha (Capital City Development Authority). Under this act, the organisation's operational jurisdiction was expanded to 590 square miles (1,500 km^{2}) in 1991, accommodating a population of nearly seven million.

In 1995, the Dhaka Metropolitan Development Plan (DMDP) was formulated for the period of 1995 to 2015, comprising three tiers: the Structure Plan, Urban Area Plan, and Detailed Area Plan. Under the Structure Plan, RAJUK devised comprehensive schemes for various zones of the Dhaka Metropolitan city, outlining planned development strategies, proposed street locations, and infrastructure layouts to enhance citizen convenience. The project's timeline has been extended until 2035. Additionally, the Urban Area Plan encompasses the development policy for the existing vicinity areas under RAJUK's jurisdiction.

== Structure ==
RAJUK operates under a board consisting of a chairperson and up to five members, all appointed by the government. The chairperson, equivalent to an Additional Secretary, serves as the chief executive of RAJUK. Each member, equivalent to Joint-Secretary level, holds specific responsibilities within one of the five divisions: development and engineering; estate and land; finance, budget and accounts; planning; and architecture. All board members are full-time officials.

== Activities ==
It carries out drives against building code violations in Dhaka City. This is challenging as policing of illegal development is limited. The agency is supposed to generate revenue from city land, which many feel conflicts with its strategic and planning functions.

== RAJUK projects ==
- Uttara Apartment Project
- Purbachal New Town
- Jhilmil Residential Project
- Urban Resilience Project
