= Neighbourhoods in the Dhaka metropolitan area =

Coordinates: 23°45′50″N 90°23′20″E

Dhaka (Bengali: ঢাকা), formerly known as Dacca, is the capital of Bangladesh. It is the ninth-largest and the sixth-most densely populated city in the world, with a population of 8.9 million residents within the city limits, and a population of over 21 million residents in the Greater Dhaka Area. Dhaka is the economic, political, and cultural center of Bangladesh, and is one of the major cities in South Asia, the largest city in Eastern South Asia.

The major suburb areas which are a part of the Dhaka Metropolitan Area and Greater Dhaka urban area are:

== Dhaka District ==
=== Dhaka North City Corporation ===
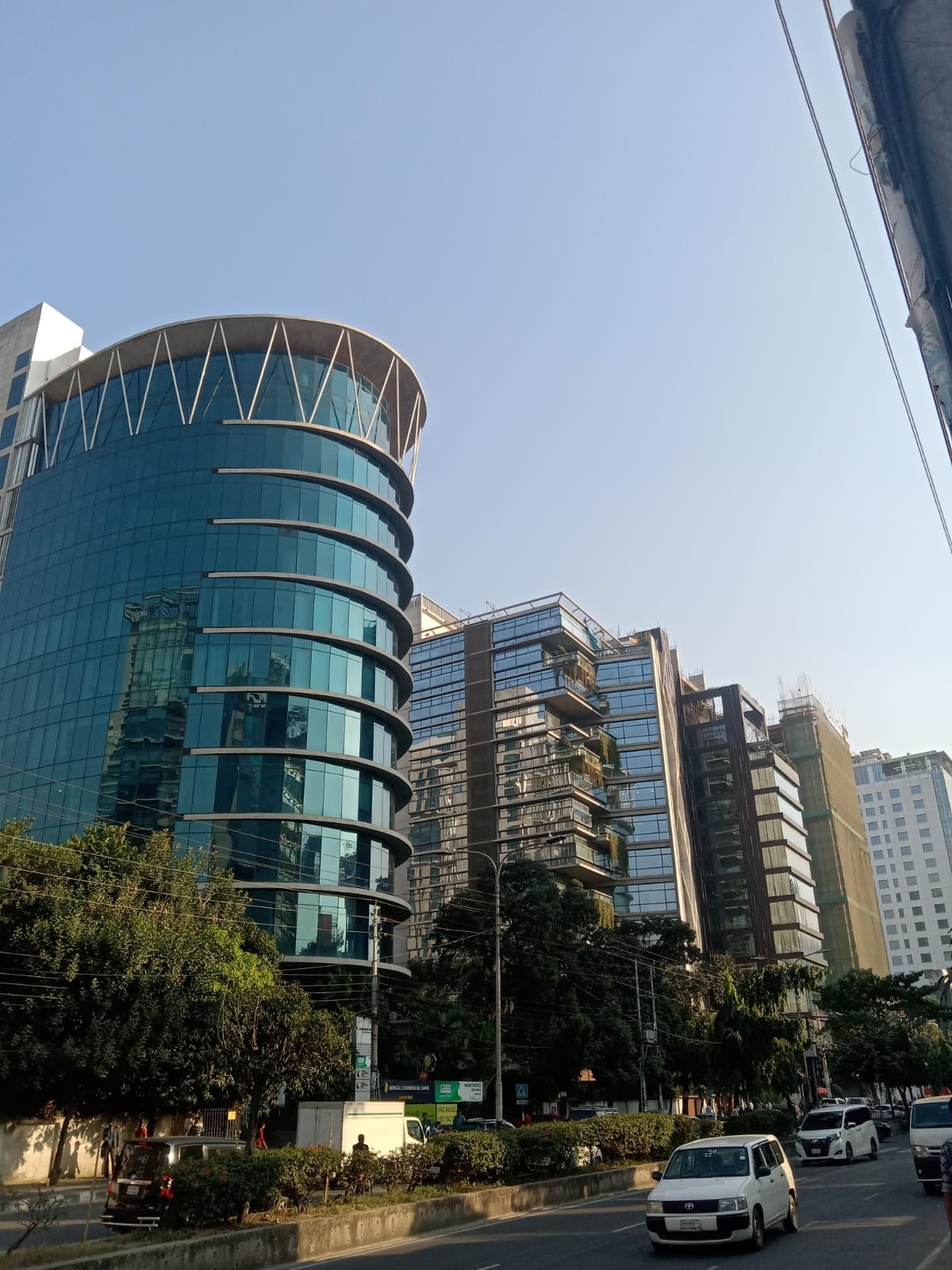
Skyline of Gulshan Avenue

- Abdullahpur
- Bochila
- Adabor
- Uttara
- Mirpur
- Pallabi
- Kazipara
- Kafrul
- Agargaon
- Sher-e-Bangla Nagar
- Cantonment area
- Banani
- Gulshan
- Niketan
- Shahjadpur
- Mohakhali
- Bashundhara
- Banasree
- Aftab Nagar
- Baridhara
- Uttarkhan
- Dakshinkhan
- Bawnia
- Khilkhet
- Tejgaon
- Farmgate
- Mohammadpur
- Rampura
- Badda
- Satarkul
- Beraid
- Khilgaon
- Vatara
- Gabtali

=== Dhaka South City Corporation ===
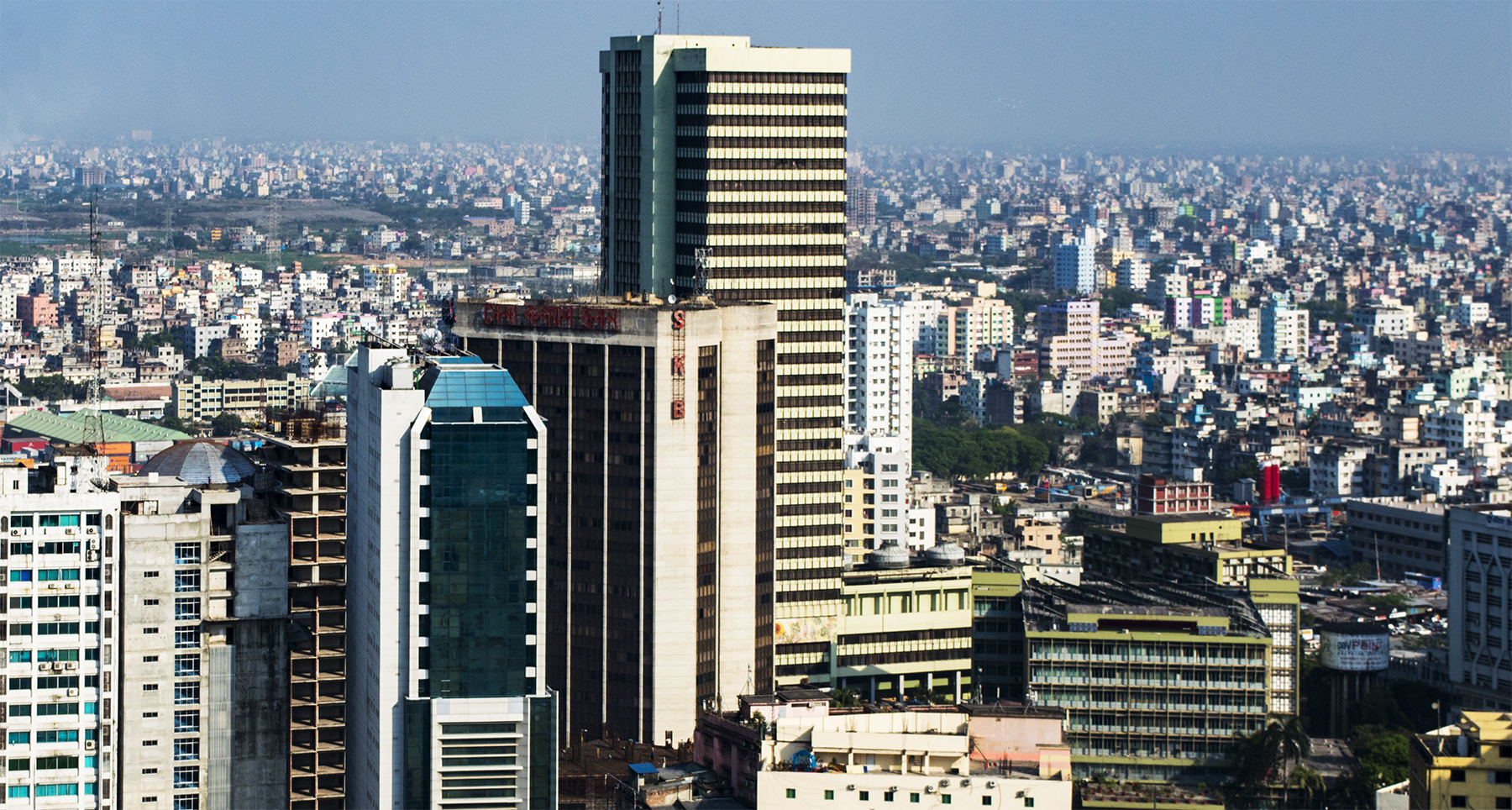
Skyline of Motijheel Commercial Area

- Hazaribagh
- Dhanmondi
- Segunbagicha
- Ramna
- Motijheel
- Sabujbagh
- Kalabagan
- Lalbagh
- Kamalapur
- Kakrail
- Kamrangirchar
- Jigatola
- Islampur
- Sadarghat
- Wari
- Kotwali
- Sutrapur
- Jurain
- Demra
- Shyampur
- Nimtoli
- Matuail
- Paribagh
- Shahbagh
- Paltan
- Jatrabari
- Shonir Akhra
- Signboard
- Japani Bazar
- Gulistan
- Bangla Bazar

=== Savar Upazila ===
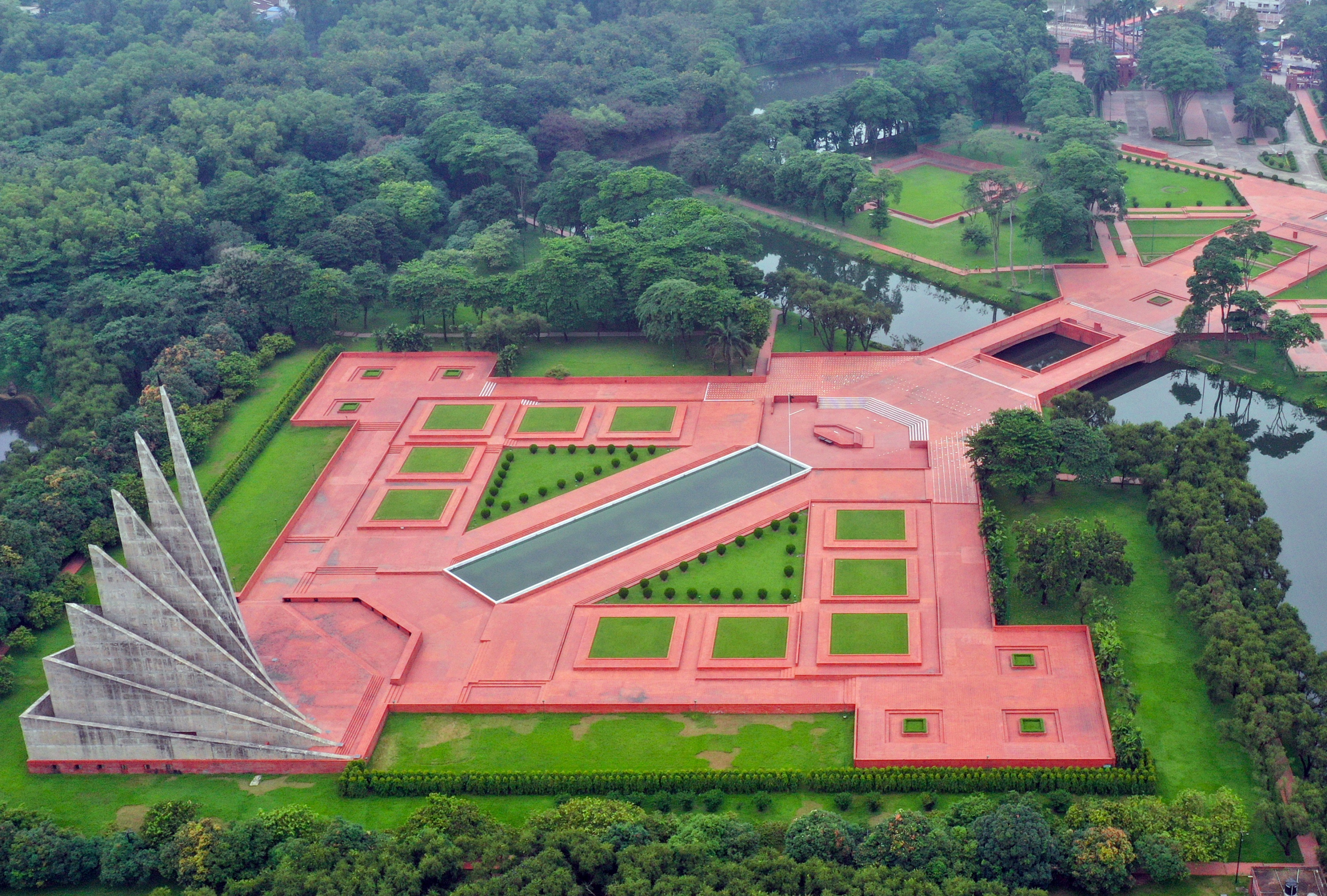
National Martyrs' Memorial, Savar

- Ashulia
- Birulia
- Savar

=== Keraniganj Upazila ===
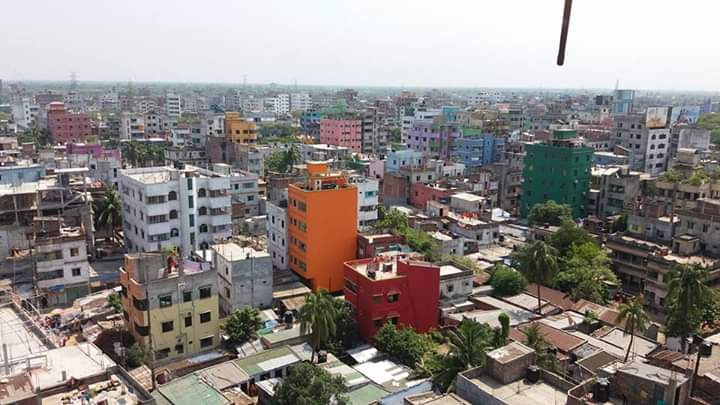
Skyline of Hasnabad

- Hasnabad
- Jinjira
- Tegharia
- Jhilmil

== Gazipur District ==
- Tongi
- Gazipur

== Narayanganj District ==
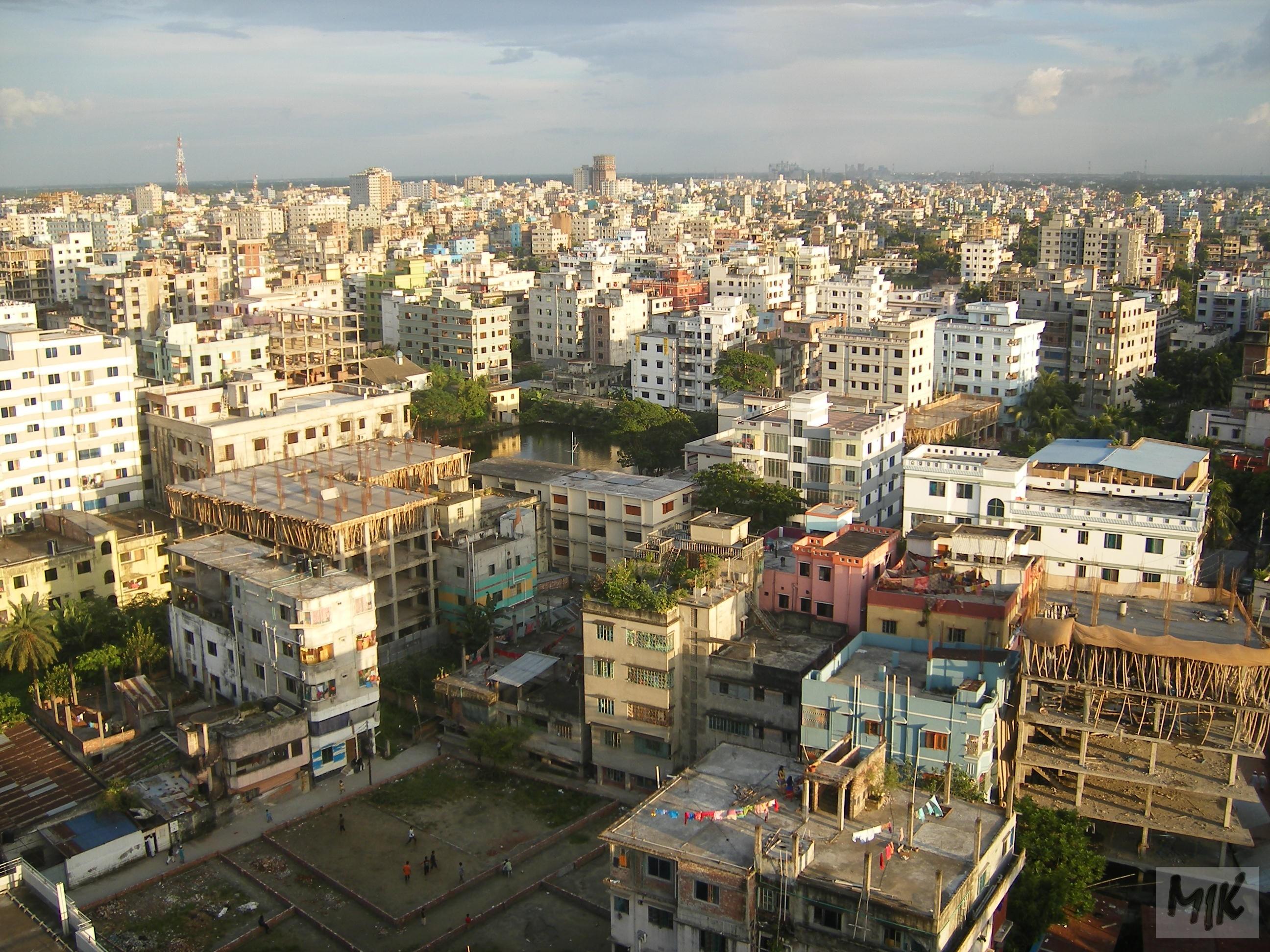
Skyline of Narayanganj

- Fatullah
- Narayanganj
- Siddhirganj

== Purbachal ==
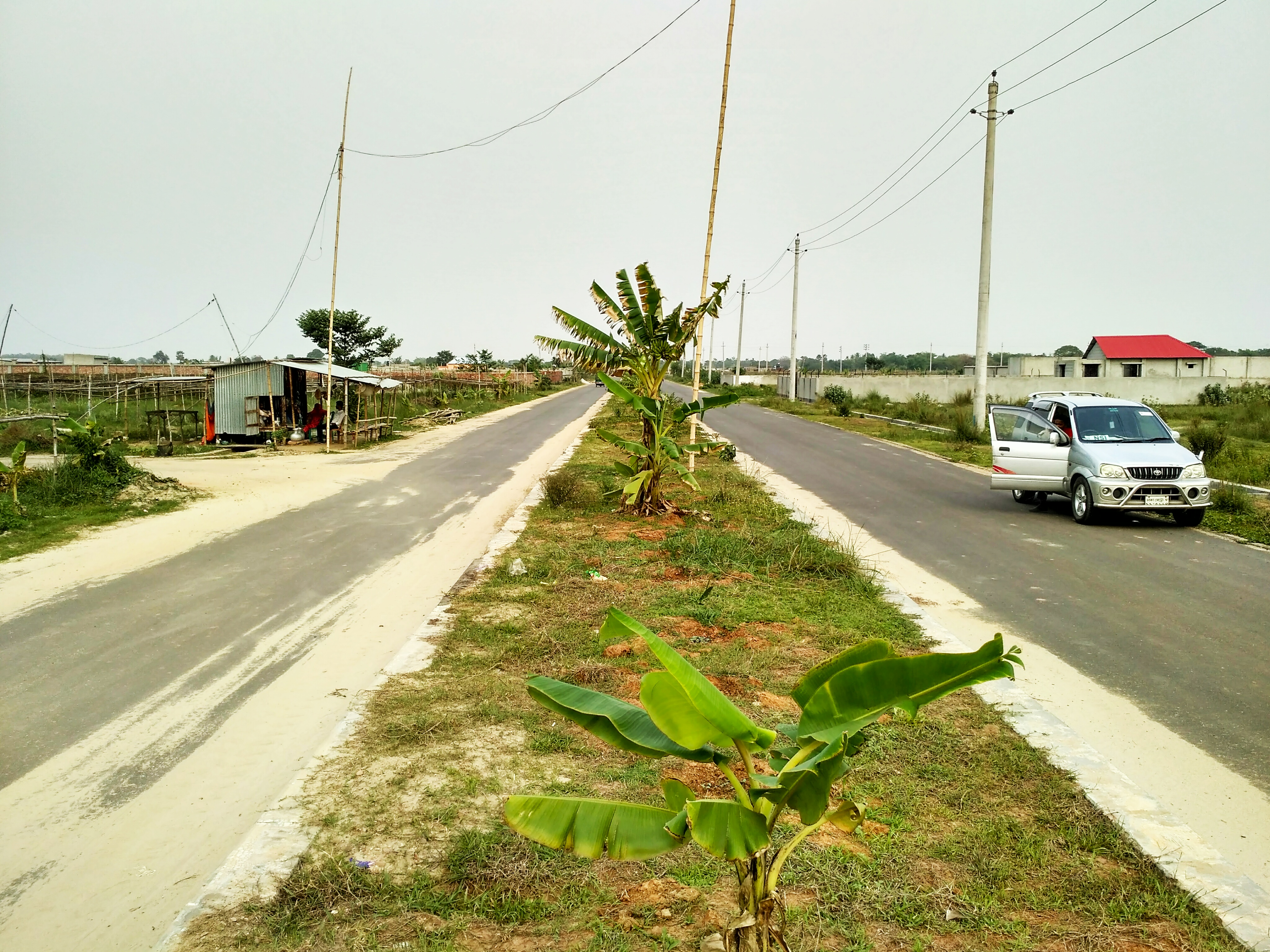
Purbachal in 2019

Purbachal Residential Model Town is the biggest planned township in Bangladesh. The project area consists of about 6,227 acres (25 square kilometer) land located in between the Shitalakshya River and the Balu River at Rupganj Upazila of Narayanganj District and at Kaliganj Upazila of Gazipur District, in the northeastern side of Dhaka.

== See also ==
- Old Dhaka
- Neighbourhoods in Chittagong Metropolitan Area
- List of places of worship in Dhaka city
