= Mayor of North Dhaka =

- Incumbent; Md. Safiqul Islam Khan since 23 February 2026
- Dhaka North City Corporation
- Term length: Five years, renewable
- Constituting instrument: Local Government (City Corporation) Act, 2009
- Precursor: Mayor of Dhaka
- Formation: 1 December 2011; 14 years ago
- Website: www.dncc.gov.bd

The mayor of North Dhaka is the head of the Dhaka North City Corporation. The mayor is directly elected every five years. The mayor "operates under the leadership" of the Ministry of Local Government, Rural Development and Co-operatives. The national government can remove the mayor by executive order. In the absence of an elected mayor, the national government can appoint an administrator for 180 days.

== History ==
Dhaka City Corporation was bifurcated into Dhaka North City Corporation and Dhaka South City Corporation by the Local Government (City Corporation) (Amendment) Act, 2011. The Bangladesh Parliament passed the bill on 29 November 2011. President Zillur Rahman signed it into law on 1 December 2011.

== List of officeholders ==
Political parties

- Awami League
- Bangladesh Nationalist Party

Other factions

- Independent

Status

- Acting Mayor or Administrator

| No. | Portrait | Officeholder (birth–death) | Election | Term of office | | | Designation | Political party | Ref. |
| No. | Portrait | Officeholder (birth–death) | Election | From | To | Period | Designation | Political party | Ref. |
|---|---|---|---|---|---|---|---|---|---|
| – | | Khorshed Alam Chowdhury | — | 5 December 2011 | 31 May 2012 | 178 days | Administrator | | |
| - | | Shahjahan Ali Molla | — | 1 June 2012 | | | Administrator | | |
| – | | Akhtar Hossain Bhuiyan | — | | | | Administrator | | |
| – | | Anwarul Islam Sikder | — | 26 November 2013 | 6 June 2014 | 192 days | Administrator | | |
| – | | Faruk Jalil | — | 15 June 2014 | 10 December 2014 | 178 days | Administrator | | |
| – | | Rakhal Chandra Barman | — | 11 December 2014 | 7 May 2015 | 147 days | Administrator | | |
| 1 | | Annisul Huq (1952–2017) | 2015 | 7 May 2015 | 30 November 2017 | 2 years, 207 days | Mayor | Awami League | |
| – | | Osman Gani (1949–2018) | — | 1 December 2017 | 22 September 2018 | 295 days | Acting Mayor | Awami League | |
| – | | Md. Jamal Mostafa | — | 22 September 2018 | 6 March 2019 | 165 days | Acting Mayor | Awami League | |
| 2 | | Atiqul Islam | 2019; 2020 | 7 March 2019 | 19 August 2024 | 7 years, 184 days | Mayor | Awami League | |
| – | | Mohammed Mahmudul Hassan | – | 19 August 2024 | 12 February 2025 | 2 years, 19 days | Administrator | Independent | |
| – | | Mohammad Azaz | – | 12 February 2025 | 9 February 2026 | 362 days | Administrator | Independent | |
| – | | Suraiya Akter Jahan | – | 9 February 2026 | 23 February 2026 | 14 days | Administrator | Independent | |
| – | | Safiqul Islam Khan Milton | – | 23 February 2026 | Incumbent | 196 days | Administrator | Bangladesh Nationalist Party | |

== Elections ==
=== Election result 2020 ===
Election Results
| Candidate | Party | Votes | Percentage | +/- |
|---|---|---|---|---|
| Atiqul Islam | Awami League | 4,47,211 | 58.67 | -30.83 |
| Tabith Awal | Bangladesh Nationalist Party | 2,64,161 | 34.66 | New |
| Sheikh Fazle Bari Masoud | Islami Andolan Bangladesh | 28,200 | 3.70 | 1.64 |
| Ahammed Sajedul | Communist Party of Bangladesh | 15,122 | 1.98 | New |
| Shahin Khan | National People's Party | 3,853 | 0.51 | -0.44 |
| Anisur Rahman Dewan | Progressive Democratic Party | 2,111 | 0.28 | -0.64 |
| Rejected Ballot | | 1,530 | 0.20 | -1.79 |
| Majority | | 1,83,050 | 24.02 | -59.42 |
| Turnout | | 7,62,188 | 25.30 | -5.75 |
| Total Registered Voters | | 30,12,509 | | ▼0.76 |
| AL Hold | | Swing | -32.745 | |

=== By-election result 2019 ===
Election Results
| Candidate | Party | Votes | Percentage | + |
|---|---|---|---|---|
| Atiqul Islam | Awami League | 839,302 | 90.93 | 38.32 |
| Shafin Ahmed | Jatiya Party (Ershad) | 52,429 | 5.68 | 5.34 |
| Abdur Rahim | Independent | 14,040 | 1.52 | New |
| Anisur Rahman Dewan | National Peoples Party | 8,659 | 0.94 | New |
| Sahin Khan | PDP | 8,560 | 0.93 | New |
| Majority | | 786,873 | 85.25 | 69.81 |
| Turnout | | | 31.05 | -6.85 |
| Total Registered Voters | | 3,035,621 | | 29.46 |
| AL Hold | | | | |

=== Election result 2015 ===
| Candidate | Party | Votes | % |
|---|---|---|---|
| Annisul Huq | Awami League | 460,117 | 52.61 |
| Tabith Awal | Bangladesh Nationalist Party | 325,080 | 37.17 |
| Fazle Bari Masoud | Islami Andolan Bangladesh | 18,050 | 2.06 |
| Mahi B. Chowdhury | Bikalpa Dhara Bangladesh | 13,407 | 1.53 |
| Zonayed Saki | Ganosanhati Andolan | 7,370 | 0.84 |
| Bahauddin Ahmed | Jatiya Party (Ershad) | 2,950 | 0.34 |
| Abdullah Al Kafi | Communist Party of Bangladesh | 2,475 | 0.28 |
| Nader Chowdhury | Jatiyo Samajtantrik Dal | 1,412 | 0.16 |
| 8 other candidates | | 10,139 | 1.16 |
| Rejected Ballot | | 33,581 | 3.84 |
| Majority | | 135,037 | 15.44 |
| Turnout | | 874,581 | 37.30 |
| Registered voters | | 2,344,900 | |
| AL Gain (New Seat) | | | |
Source: bdnews24.com
