= 2020 Dhaka North City Corporation election =

Mayoral election in Bangladesh

- 1 February 2020
- Registered: 3,012,509 (▼0.76 pp)
- Turnout: 25.30% (▼5.75 pp)
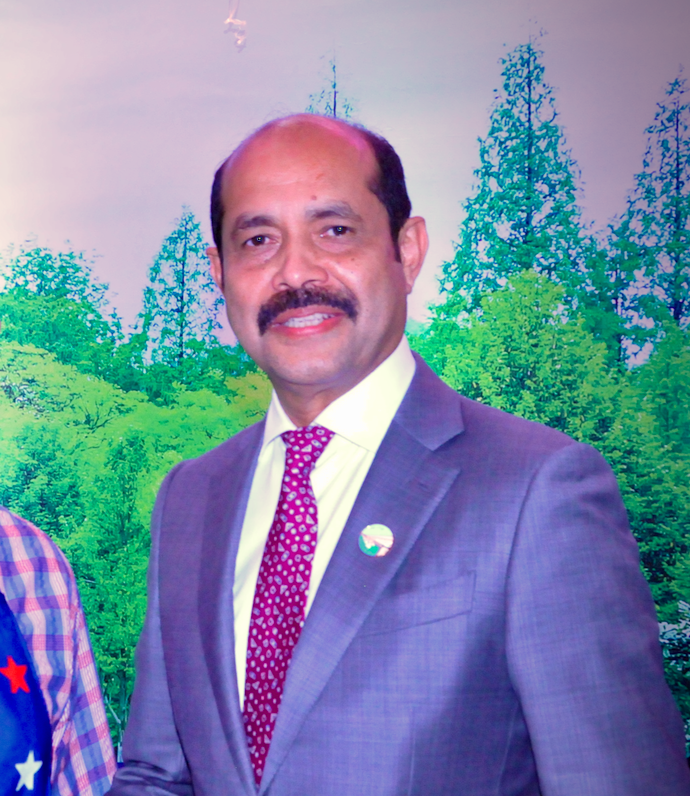

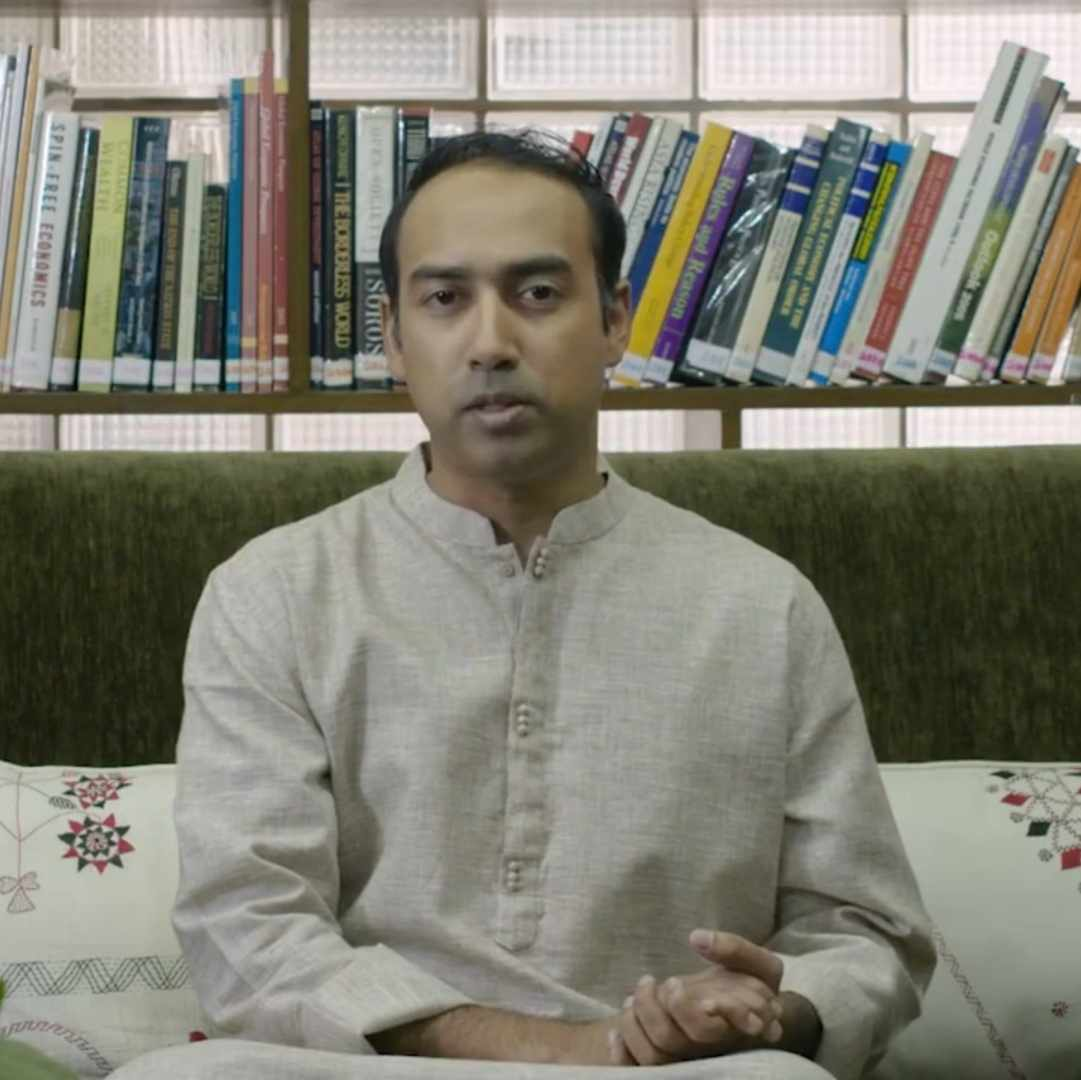
	First party	Second party
Candidate	Atiqul Islam	Tabith Awal
Party	AL	BNP
Popular vote	447,211	264,161
Percentage	58.67%	34.66%
Swing	▼30.37pp	▼2.50pp
Mayor before election
Atiqul Islam
AL
Elected Mayor
Atiqul Islam
AL
- Council election
- 1 February 2020; 72 seats in the Dhaka North City Corporation
Party	Leader	Seats	+/–
AL	Atiqul Islam	62	+30
BNP	Tabith Awal	2	0
JP(E)	Didn't contest	1	0
Independent	—	7	−6
This lists parties that won seats. See the complete results below.

The 2020 Dhaka North City Corporation election was a local government election in the city of Dhaka, Bangladesh, held on 1 February 2020 to elect the mayor of North Dhaka and the Dhaka North City Council. A total of six candidates participated in the election. The election resulted in a victory for the Awami League candidate Atiqul Islam. In the 72 member city council, the Awami League won 62 seats, while independents won 7 seats, the BNP won 2 seats, and the JP(E) won 1 seat. However, the results were rejected by the main opposition candidate, Tabith Awal of the Bangladesh Nationalist Party. This election was criticized by opposition parties and observers for low voter turnout and allegations of irregularities, and it was not seen by many as a fully free and fair election.

It was the first major election in Bangladesh conducted entirely using electronic voting machines (EVMs) alongside the 2020 Dhaka South City Corporation election. Previously the country had made only limited use of EVMs. The ruling Awami League supported the adoption of EVMs. BNP and Communist Party of Bangladesh leaders said they feared the machines would be used for vote rigging. One concern expressed was that the machines do not have a voter-verified paper audit trail.

== Candidates ==
The election was mainly contested between candidates of the two major political parties in Bangladesh:

List of mayoral candidates
Party	Flag	Symbol	Candidates
Bangladesh Awami League			Atiqul Islam
Bangladesh Nationalist Party			Tabith Awal

Other minor candidates from smaller parties and independent candidates also participated.

== Timeline ==
Poll Event	Schedule
Official declaration from the Election Commission	22 December 2019
Declaration of the schedule	22 December 2019
Application deadline for candidates	31 December 2019
Scrutiny of nomination	2 January 2020
Last Date for Withdrawal of nomination	9 January 2020
Symbol allocation	10 January 2020
Start of campaign period	10 January 2020
End of campaign period	30 January 2020
Date of Poll	1 February 2020
Date of Counting of Votes	1 February 2020

== Mayoral election results ==
Election results
Candidate	Party	Votes	Percentage	+/-
Atiqul Islam	Bangladesh Awami League	447,211	58.67	-30.83
Tabith Awal	Bangladesh Nationalist Party	264,161	34.66	New
Sheikh Fazle Bari Masoud	Islami Andolan Bangladesh	28,200	3.70	1.64
Ahammed Sajedul	Communist Party of Bangladesh	15,122	1.98	New
Shahin Khan	National People's Party	3,853	0.51	-0.44
Anisur Rahman Dewan	Progressive Democratic Party	2,111	0.28	-0.64
Rejected ballots		1,530	0.20	-1.79
Majority		183,050	24.02	-59.42
Turnout		762,188	25.30	-5.75
Total registered voters		3,012,509		▼0.76
AL hold		Swing	-32.745	

== Council election results ==
=== Party-wise ===
2020 DNCC council election results (party-wise)
Party	Leader	Councilor contested seats	Councilor elected in Seats	Ward Councilors	Reserved Women Councilors
Bangladesh Awami League	Atiqul Islam	72	62 / 72	44	18
Bangladesh Nationalist Party	Tabith Awal	72	2 / 72	2	0
Jatiya Party (Ershad)	Didn't participate	unknown	1 / 72	1	0
Independent	unknown		7 / 72	7	0
Total			72	54	18
