= Dhaka North City Corporation =

Local governing body of Dhaka North, Bangladesh

Coordinates: 23.7859°N 90.4168°E

Dhaka North City Corporation ঢাকা উত্তর সিটি কর্পোরেশন
- Emblem of the Dhaka North City Corporation

Type
- Type: City Corporation

History
- Founded: 1 December 2011; 14 years ago
- Preceded by: Dhaka City Corporation
- New session started: 23 February 2026; (241 days)

Leadership
- Mayor: Vacant since 19 August 2024
- Administrator: Safiqul Islam Khan Milton, BNP since 23 February 2026
- Deputy Mayor: Vacant since 22 September 2018
- Chief Executive Officer: Mir Khairul Alam since 2 January 2024

Structure
- Seats: Vacant seats 72 councillors
- Length of term: Up to five years

Elections
- Voting system: First past the post
- First election: 30 April 2015
- Last election: 1 February 2020
- Next election: 2026

Meeting place
- Nagar Bhaban, Gulshan Center Point, Circle 2, Gulshan, Dhaka 1212

Website
- dncc.gov.bd

Dhaka North City Corporation (Note: Bengali: ঢাকা উত্তর সিটি কর্পোরেশন, romanised: Ḍhākā Uttar Siṭi Kôrporēśôn, lit. 'Dhaka North City Corporation') is the local government authority responsible for providing civic services and administering the northern part of Dhaka, the capital of Bangladesh. The government of DNCC is elected by popular vote every five years. The corporation is headed by a mayor, who oversees a city council consisting of 72 councillors representing the city's wards. The functions, powers, and responsibilities of the corporation are governed by the provisions of the Local Government (City Corporation) Act, 2009.

In 2022, the total population under the jurisdiction of the Dhaka North City Corporation was 5,990,723, which has given the city area a density of 30,531 per kilometer. Annisul Huq was the first mayor of the Dhaka North City Corporation, after being elected in April 2015.

There are plans of expanding the boundary of Dhaka North City Corporation to integrate Purbachal into Dhaka.

== History ==
Dhaka North City Corporation was established on 29 November 2011. Prior to the establishment of the corporation, northern Dhaka was governed by the former Dhaka City Corporation. The Dhaka City Corporation was dissolved by the Local Government (City Corporation) Amendment Bill 2011 on 29 November 2011, passed in the Parliament of Bangladesh, and formally ceased to exist on 1 December 2011, following the President's approval, making way for Dhaka North and Dhaka South city corporations. The mayoral elections are non-partisan in nature. The first Dhaka North City Corporation elections were held on 28 April 2015, which saw the victory of Annisul Huq in the first political campaign of his career.

On 9 May 2016, the government approved the expansion of Dhaka North City Corporation's jurisdiction to encompass eight unions: Beraid, Badda, Vatara (or Bhatara), Satarkul, Harirampur, Uttarkhan, Dakshinkhan, and Dumni. This extension increased the area of the city corporation to 197 square kilometres (76 sq mi).

In November 2017, Mayor Huq died on a trip to London, while visiting his daughter. In September previously, the local government ministry announced the creation of a panel of three senior elected councilors who will act as joint mayor while he was hospitalised. In February 2019, Awami League candidate Atiqul Islam was elected as the new mayor of DNCC in a by-election.

== Administration ==
Dhaka North City Corporation's jurisdiction encompasses 54 wards covering the thanas of Turag, Uttara West, Uttara East, Uttarkhan, Dakshinkhan, Bimanbandar, Khilkhet, Vatara, Badda, Rampura, Hatirjheel, Tejgaon I/A, Tejgaon, Sher-E-Bangla Nagar, Mohammadpur, Adabor, Darussalam, Mirpur, Pallabi, Rupnagar, Shah Ali, Kafrul, Bhashantek, Cantonment, Banani and Gulshan.

== Functions and Services ==
The Dhaka North City Corporation (DNCC) is responsible for administering the city and ensuring the provision of essential infrastructure and public services. Its functions include urban planning, transport management, healthcare, education, waste management, water supply, and security. Through these services, DNCC aims to improve the quality of life for residents and promote sustainable urban development.

Departments of Dhaka North City Corporation
#	Department	Functions / Services
1	Office of the Mayor	Executive leadership; overall city north part governance; policy direction; supervision of all DNCC departments
2	Chief Executive Office	Inter-departmental coordination; monitoring implementation of civic services and development projects
3	Administration and Establishment	Human resource management; recruitment, posting and promotion of staff; internal administration and discipline
4	Finance and Accounts	Budget formulation; financial planning; revenue and expenditure control; payments; accounting and internal audit
5	Engineering	Construction and maintenance of roads and infrastructure; building plan approval; road-cutting permission; contractor enlistment
6	Urban planning and Development	Urban development projects; road, drain, bridge and footpath construction; land development; city beautification
7	Electricity	Installation and maintenance of street lights; electrical infrastructure; city illumination
8	Transportation and Communication	Traffic and parking management; bus terminal supervision; emergency transport services; ambulance operations
9	Waste management and Cleaning	Solid waste collection and disposal; street sweeping; drain cleaning; mosquito control; landfill management
10	Health	Coordination of maternal and child health programs; immunization; vitamin A campaigns; health worker training
11	Registrar	Registration and issuance of birth and death certificates; nationality and character certificates
12	Education and Culture	Management of DNCC-run schools and educational programs; cultural activities; libraries and community centers
13	Water supply and Sewerage	Coordination of water supply and sewerage services with Dhaka WASA
14	Revenue	Trade license issuance and renewal; holding tax assessment and collection; market and municipal asset management
15	Security and Law and order	City security; coordination with DMP; CCTV installation and monitoring
16	Magistracy	Mobile courts; arbitration-based dispute resolution; anti-adulteration drives
17	Housing and Public works	Development and maintenance of municipal housing, plots and public buildings
18	Social welfare	Welfare programs for the poor, elderly, women and persons with disabilities; community development
19	Environmental and Public health	Pollution control; sanitation monitoring; food safety; climate resilience and urban greening
20	Disaster management and Relief	Disaster preparedness; emergency response; relief distribution during floods, fires and other calamities
21	Religious Welfare	Support for religious festivals; Qurbani cattle market management; logistical support for religious events

== Demographics ==
Religions in Dhaka North City Corporation (2022)
Religion	Percent
Islam	96.00%
Hinduism	3.00%
Christianity	0.75%
Other or not stated	0.25%

According to the 2022 Census of Bangladesh, DNCC had 59,90,723 population living in 16,36,924 households. Among them, 57,50,463 were Muslims, 1,84,881 were Hindus, 44,965 were Christians, 9,068 were Buddhists and 1,346 were Others, including Tribal faiths. There were 15,724 ethnic populations including males and females. DNCC had a sex ratio of 120.21 indicating that there were 120 males for every 100 females.

== Annual Budget ==
Dhaka North City Corporation (DNCC) has announced a ৳5594 crore (US$460 million) budget for fiscal year of 2024–25.

== Wards and councillors ==
Dhaka North City Corporation is administratively divided into 54 wards and 10 Zones. Each ward is represented by one elected councillor, while additional reserved women councillors are elected for groups of wards, as provided under the Local Government (City Corporation) Act.

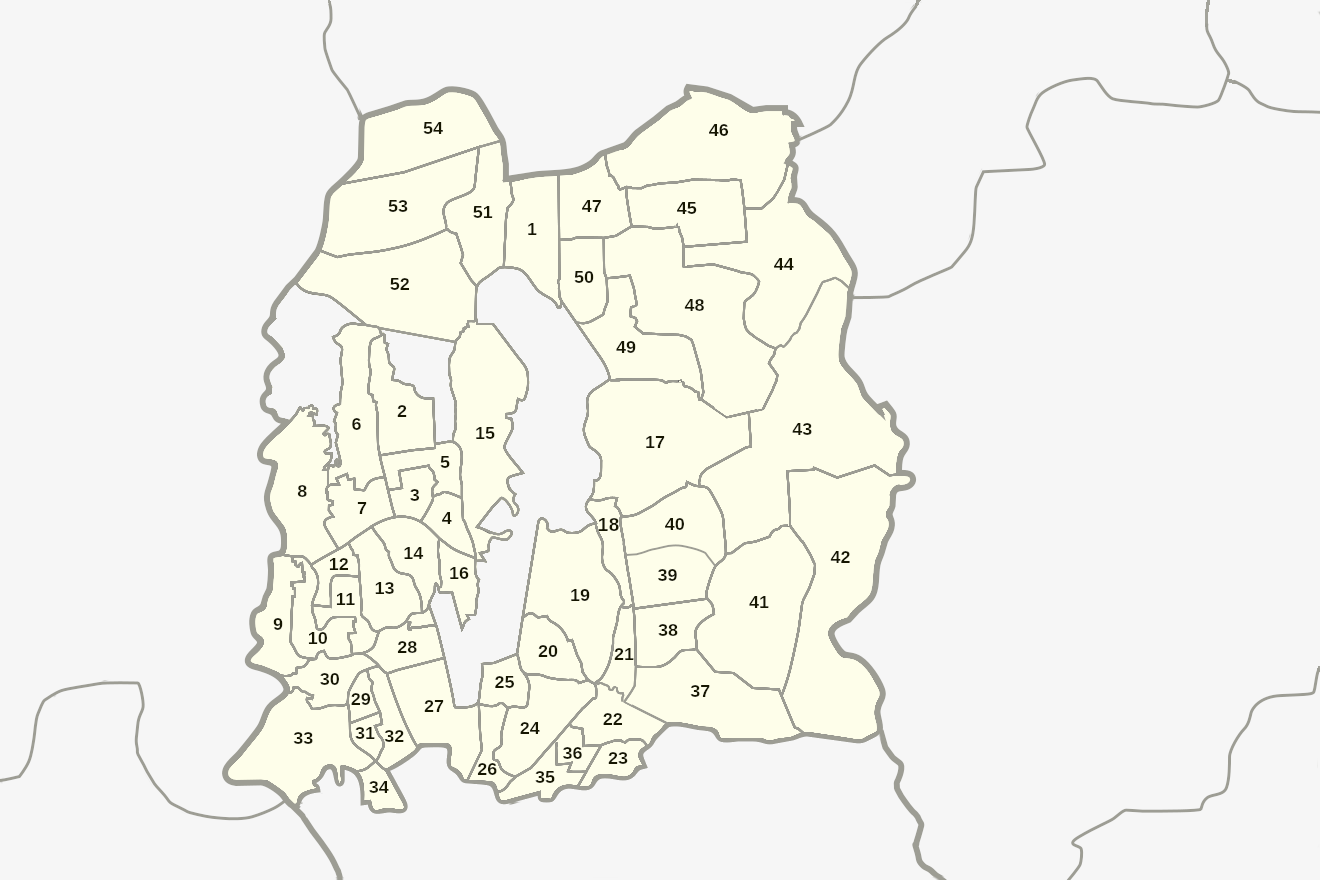
Ward serial of Dhaka North City Corporation

=== Councillors of Dhaka North City Corporation ===
Zone	Ward	Locations Covered	Councillor	Party
Zone-1	Ward-1	Uttara Sectors 1–10, Abdullahpur (part), Faydabad, South Khan (part)	Vacant	TBD
Zone-2	Ward-2	Mirpur Section-12, Kalshi, ECB area	Vacant	TBD
Zone-2	Ward-3	Mirpur Section-10 & 11	Vacant	TBD
Zone-2	Ward-4	Section-13, 14, Baishteki	Vacant	TBD
Zone-2	Ward-5	Section-11, Pallabi area	Vacant	TBD
Zone-2	Ward-6	Pallabi, Rupnagar, Duaripara	Vacant	TBD
Zone-2	Ward-7	Rupnagar Residential Area	Vacant	TBD
Zone-2	Ward-8	Mirpur Section-1, Zoo Road	Vacant	TBD
Zone-4	Ward-9	Gabtoli, Amin Bazaar	Vacant	TBD
Zone-4	Ward-10	Darus Salam, Mirpur Road	Vacant	TBD
Zone-4	Ward-11	Kalyanpur, Pikepara	Vacant	TBD
Zone-4	Ward-12	Shah Ali, Bishil	Vacant	TBD
Zone-4	Ward-13	Taltola, Agargaon (part), Sher-e-Bangla Nagar area	Vacant	TBD
Zone-4	Ward-14	Kazipara, Shewrapara	Vacant	TBD
Zone-2	Ward-15	Bhashantek, Matikata	Vacant	TBD
Zone-4	Ward-16	Kafrul, Ibrahimpur	Vacant	TBD
Zone-1	Ward-17	Khilkhet, Kuril, Joar Sahara	Vacant	TBD
Zone-3	Ward-18	Baridhara, Shahjadpur	Vacant	TBD
Zone-3	Ward-19	Banani, Gulahan, Korail	Vacant	TBD
Zone-3	Ward-20	Mohakhali, Niketan	Vacant	TBD
Zone-3	Ward-21	Badda (North, South, Middle)	Vacant	TBD
Zone-3	Ward-22	Rampura, Ulon	Vacant	TBD
Zone-3	Ward-23	Khilgaon, Malibag	Vacant	TBD
Zone-3	Ward-24	Tejgaon Industrial Area	Vacant	TBD
Zone-3	Ward-25	Nakhalpara	Vacant	TBD
Zone-5	Ward-26	Karwan Bazar, Green Road	Vacant	TBD
Zone-5	Ward-27	Tejturi Bazar	Vacant	TBD
Zone-5	Ward-28	Agargaon, Shyamoli	Vacant	TBD
Zone-5	Ward-29	Mohammadpur	Vacant	TBD
Zone-5	Ward-30	Adabor, Shekhertek	Vacant	TBD
Zone-5	Ward-31	Asad Avenue area	Vacant	TBD
Zone-5	Ward-32	Lalmatia	Vacant	TBD
Zone-5	Ward-33	Bosila, Mohammadia Housing	Vacant	TBD
Zone-5	Ward-34	Rayer Bazar	Vacant	TBD
Zone-3	Ward-35	Magbazar, Eskaton	Vacant	TBD
Zone-3	Ward-36	Mogbazar, Noyatola	Vacant	TBD
Zone-10	Ward-37	Badda area	Vacant	TBD
Zone-10	Ward-38	North Badda	Vacant	TBD
Zone-9	Ward-39	Nurer Chala	Vacant	TBD
Zone-9	Ward-40	Bhatara	Vacant	TBD
Zone-10	Ward-41	Merul Badda	Vacant	TBD
Zone-10	Ward-42	Beraid	Vacant	TBD
Zone-9	Ward-43	Dumni	Vacant	TBD
Zone-8	Ward-44	Uttarkhan rural	Vacant	TBD
Zone-8	Ward-45	Uttarkhan	Vacant	TBD
Zone-8	Ward-46	Chanpara, Rajabari	Vacant	TBD
Zone-7	Ward-47	Faydabad, Chalaban	Vacant	TBD
Zone-7	Ward-48	Dakshinkhan	Vacant	TBD
Zone-7	Ward-49	Ashkona, Kaola	Vacant	TBD
Zone-7	Ward-50	Azampur	Vacant	TBD
Zone-6	Ward-51	Uttara Sectors 11–14	Vacant	TBD
Zone-6	Ward-52	Baunia, Dolipara	Vacant	TBD
Zone-6	Ward-53	Diyabari	Vacant	TBD
Zone-6	Ward-54	Kamarpara, Ashutia	Vacant	TBD
	Reserved women's seats			
	55	Women's seat-1	Vacant	TBD
	56	Women's seat-2	Vacant	TBD
	57	Women's seat-3	Vacant	TBD
	58	Women's seat-4	Vacant	TBD
	59	Women's seat-5	Vacant	TBD
	60	Women's seat-6	Vacant	TBD
	61	Women's seat-7	Vacant	TBD
	62	Women's seat-8	Vacant	TBD
	63	Women's seat-9	Vacant	TBD
	64	Women's seat-10	Vacant	TBD
	65	Women's seat-11	Vacant	TBD
	66	Women's seat-12	Vacant	TBD
	67	Women's seat-13	Vacant	TBD
	68	Women's seat-14	Vacant	TBD
	69	Women's seat-15	Vacant	TBD
	70	Women's seat-16	Vacant	TBD
	71	Women's seat-17	Vacant	TBD
	72	Women's seat-18	Vacant	TBD

== Awards ==
- National ICT Award, 2017

== List of mayors ==
Political parties

- Awami League
- Bangladesh Nationalist Party

Other factions

- Independent

Status

- Acting Mayor or Administrator

No.	Portrait	Officeholder (birth–death)	Election	Term of office			Designation	Political party	Ref.
No.	Portrait	Officeholder (birth–death)	Election	From	To	Period	Designation	Political party	Ref.
–		Khorshed Alam Chowdhury	—	5 December 2011	31 May 2012	178 days	Administrator		
-		Shahjahan Ali Molla	—	1 June 2012			Administrator		
–		Akhtar Hossain Bhuiyan	—				Administrator		
–		Anwarul Islam Sikder	—	26 November 2013	6 June 2014	192 days	Administrator		
–		Faruk Jalil	—	15 June 2014	10 December 2014	178 days	Administrator		
–		Rakhal Chandra Barman	—	11 December 2014	7 May 2015	147 days	Administrator		
1		Annisul Huq (1952–2017)	2015	7 May 2015	30 November 2017	2 years, 207 days	Mayor	Awami League	
–		Osman Gani (1949–2018)	—	1 December 2017	22 September 2018	295 days	Acting Mayor	Awami League	
–		Md. Jamal Mostafa	—	22 September 2018	6 March 2019	165 days	Acting Mayor	Awami League	
2		Atiqul Islam	2019; 2020	7 March 2019	19 August 2024	7 years, 229 days	Mayor	Awami League	
–		Mohammed Mahmudul Hassan	–	19 August 2024	12 February 2025	2 years, 64 days	Administrator	Independent	
–		Mohammad Azaz	–	12 February 2025	9 February 2026	362 days	Administrator	Independent	
–		Suraiya Akter Jahan	–	9 February 2026	23 February 2026	14 days	Administrator	Independent	
–		Safiqul Islam Khan Milton	–	23 February 2026	Incumbent	241 days	Administrator	Bangladesh Nationalist Party	

- ^{†} Died in office
- By-election

== Deputies ==
The deputy mayor (also known as Panel mayor) is the elected executive of the City Corporation. Three Panel Mayors are chosen from council members, with the top-voted serving as Deputy Mayor and Acting Mayor in the Mayor’s absence. The other two Panel Mayors assist in overseeing key offices and supporting executive functions.

No.	Post	Incumbent
01	Panel Mayor 1	Vacant
02	Panel Mayor 2	Vacant
03	Panel Mayor 3	Vacant

== Past elections ==
=== Election result 2020 ===
Election Results
Candidate	Party	Votes	Percentage	+/-
Atiqul Islam	Awami League	4,47,211	58.67	-30.83
Tabith Awal	Bangladesh Nationalist Party	2,64,161	34.66	New
Sheikh Fazle Bari Masoud	Islami Andolan Bangladesh	28,200	3.70	1.64
Ahammed Sajedul	Communist Party of Bangladesh	15,122	1.98	New
Shahin Khan	National People's Party	3,853	0.51	-0.44
Anisur Rahman Dewan	Progressive Democratic Party	2,111	0.28	-0.64
Rejected Ballot		1,530	0.20	-1.79
Majority		1,83,050	24.02	-59.42
Turnout		7,62,188	25.30	-5.75
Total Registered Voters		30,12,509		▼0.76
AL Hold		Swing	-32.745	

=== By-election result 2019 ===
Election Results
Candidate	Party	Votes	Percentage	+
Atiqul Islam	Awami League	839,302	90.93	38.32
Shafin Ahmed	Jatiya Party (Ershad)	52,429	5.68	5.34
Abdur Rahim	Independent	14,040	1.52	New
Anisur Rahman Dewan	National Peoples Party	8,659	0.94	New
Sahin Khan	PDP	8,560	0.93	New
Majority		786,873	85.25	69.81
Turnout			31.05	-6.85
Total Registered Voters		3,035,621		29.46
AL Hold				

=== Election result 2015 ===
Candidate	Party	Votes	%
Annisul Huq	Awami League	460,117	52.61
Tabith Awal	Bangladesh Nationalist Party	325,080	37.17
Fazle Bari Masoud	Islami Andolan Bangladesh	18,050	2.06
Mahi B. Chowdhury	Bikalpa Dhara Bangladesh	13,407	1.53
Zonayed Saki	Ganosanhati Andolan	7,370	0.84
Bahauddin Ahmed	Jatiya Party (Ershad)	2,950	0.34
Abdullah Al Kafi	Communist Party of Bangladesh	2,475	0.28
Nader Chowdhury	Jatiyo Samajtantrik Dal	1,412	0.16
8 other candidates		10,139	1.16
Rejected Ballot		33,581	3.84
Majority		135,037	15.44
Turnout		874,581	37.30
Registered voters		2,344,900	
AL Gain (New Seat)			
Source: bdnews24.com

== See also ==
- Districts of Bangladesh
- Divisions of Bangladesh
- Upazilas of Bangladesh
- List of city corporations in Bangladesh
- Administrative geography of Bangladesh
