= Muhammad Ejaz =

Muhammad Ejaz may refer to:

- Muhammad Ejaz (footballer)
- Mohamed Ijaz, Pakistani detainee at Guantanamo Bay
- Mohammad Azaz, Bangladeshi environment activist
