= Sarwar Bin Kashem =

Lieutenant Colonel of the Bangladesh Army

Sarwar Bin Kashem is a Lieutenant Colonel of the Bangladesh Army and former director of the intelligence wing of the Rapid Action Battalion, an elite paramilitary force. He was the former commanding officer of Rapid Action Battalion-1.

== Career ==
Kashem was commissioned into Bangladesh Army as part of the 43rd Bangladesh Military Academy long course in 2000.

In 2017, Kashem was appointed the commanding officer of Rapid Action Battalion-1. He was awarded the Bangladesh Police Medal. He led raids against illegal casinos in Dhaka and detention of businessman Salim Prodhan, Jubo League leaders Khalid Mahmud Bhuiyan and Ismail Hossain Samrat. He led operations against juvenile gangs in Uttarkhan and Turag. He led the operation to detain GK Shamim, a Jubo League leader and contractor. He detained Tarequzzaman Rajib, ward commissioner of Mohammadpur, in October 2019. In September 2019, he was appointed director of the Legal and Media Wing of the Rapid Action Battalion. He replaced Lieutenant Colonel Md Emranul Hassan.

Kashem was appointed Director of the Intelligence Wing of the Rapid Action Battalion. Lieutenant Colonel Ashique Billah replaced his as the director of the Legal and Media Wing of the Rapid Action Battalion.

After the fall of the Sheikh Hasina led Awami League government, Kashem was detained with 14 other Bangladesh Army officers. They were accused of crimes against humanity at the International Crimes Tribunal-1 over enforced disappearance during the rule by Sheikh Hasina. He was sent to jail in October 2025. He was detained at a temporary prison established in Dhaka Cantonment for the trail.
