= 2019 Dhaka North City Corporation by-election =

Election in Bangladesh

2019 Dhaka North mayoral by-election
- 28 February 2019
- Registered: 3,035,599 (▲29.46 pp)
- Turnout: 31.05% (▼6.24 pp)
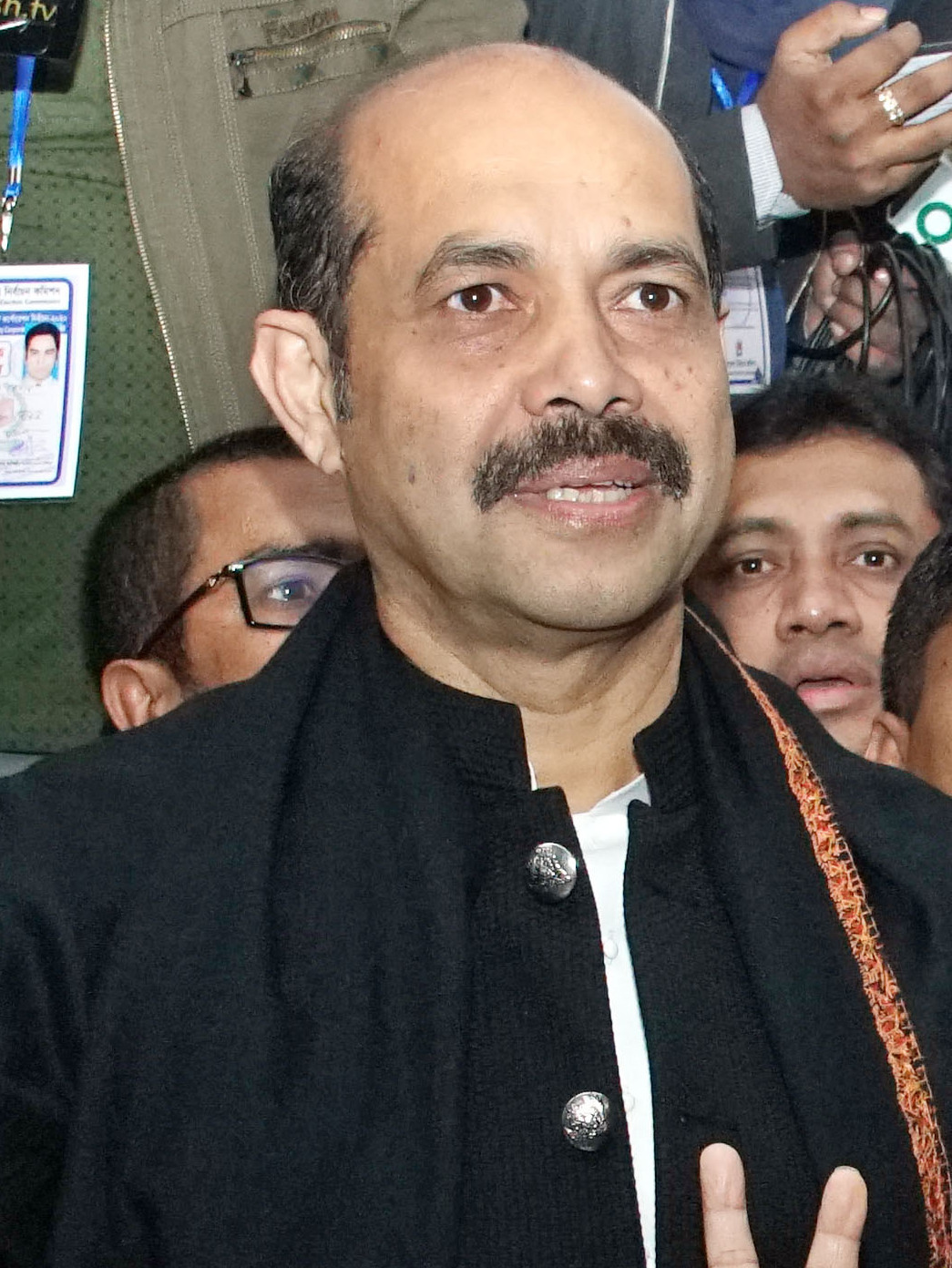

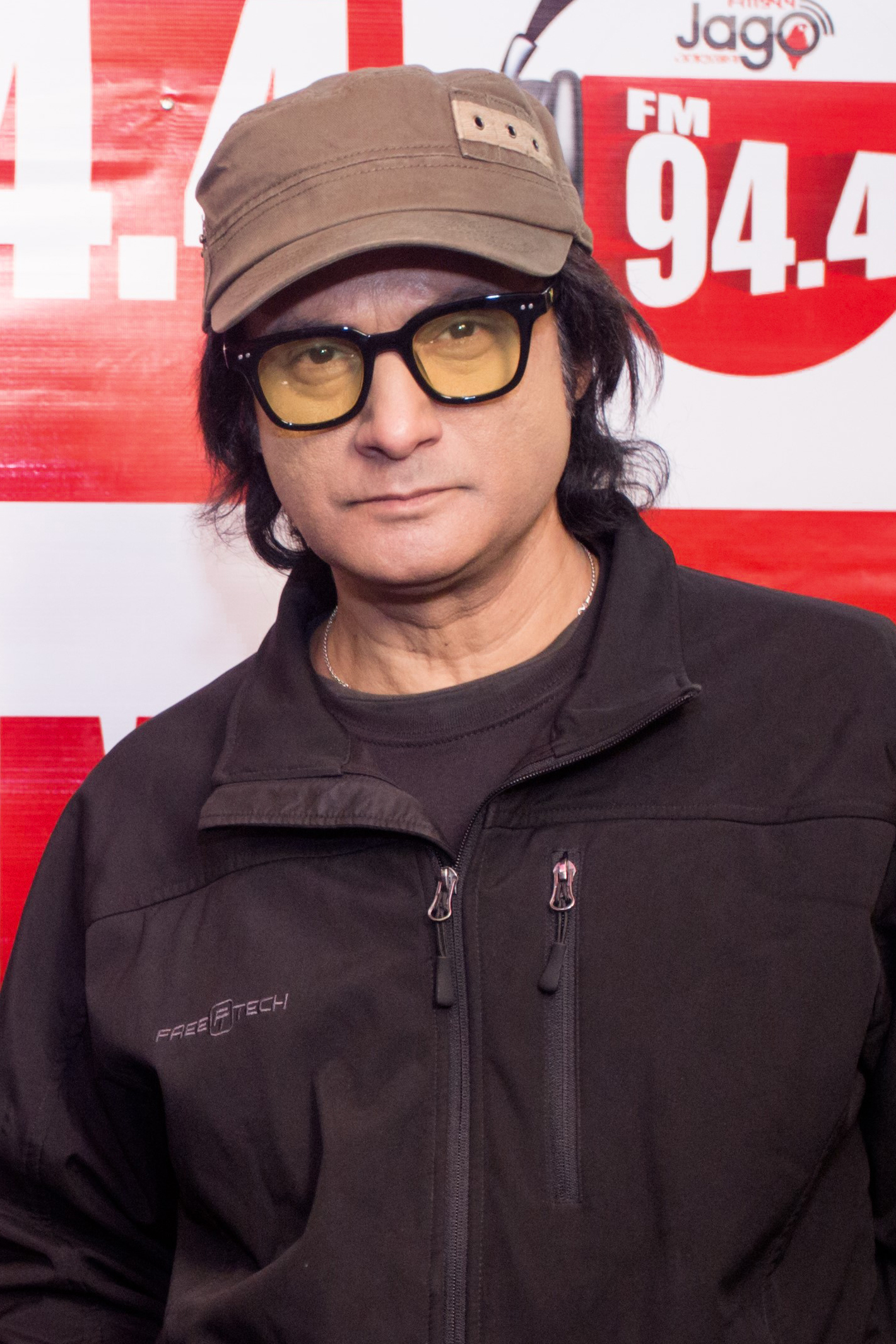
	First party	Second party
Candidate	Atiqul Islam	Shafin Ahmed
Party	Awami League	JP(E)
Popular vote	839,202	52,829
Percentage	89.04%	5.60%
Swing	▲36.44pp	▲5.26pp
Mayor before election
Annisul Huq
AL
Elected Mayor
Atiqul Islam
AL

The 2019 Dhaka North City Corporation by-election was held on 28 February 2019 due to the death of Mayor Annisul Huq. The election was boycotted by the main opposition, the BNP. A total of 5 mayoral candidates took part in election. Atiqul Islam won the election by 786,473 votes. This election had a low turnout, with a decrease of 6.24% from the last election.

== Results ==
=== Mayoral election results ===
Results by party

Vote share by party
1. Bangladesh Awami League (89.0%)
2. Jatiya Party (Ershad) (5.60%)
3. Others (5.35%)

Election Results
Candidate	Party	Votes	Percentage	+
Atiqul Islam	Awami League	839,302	89.05	36.44
Shafin Ahmed	Jatiya Party (Ershad)	52,429	5.60	5.26
Abdur Rahim	Independent	14,040	1.49	New
Sahin Khan	PDP	8,650	0.92	New
Anisur Rahman Dewan	National Peoples Party	8,995	0.95	New
Rejected Ballot		18,723	1.99	-1.85
Majority		786,473	83.44	67.08
Turnout		942,539	31.05	-6.25
Total Registered Voters		3,035,599		▲29.46
AL Hold		Swing	+15.59	
