= Uttarkhan =

Uttarkhan উত্তরখান
- Neighborhood
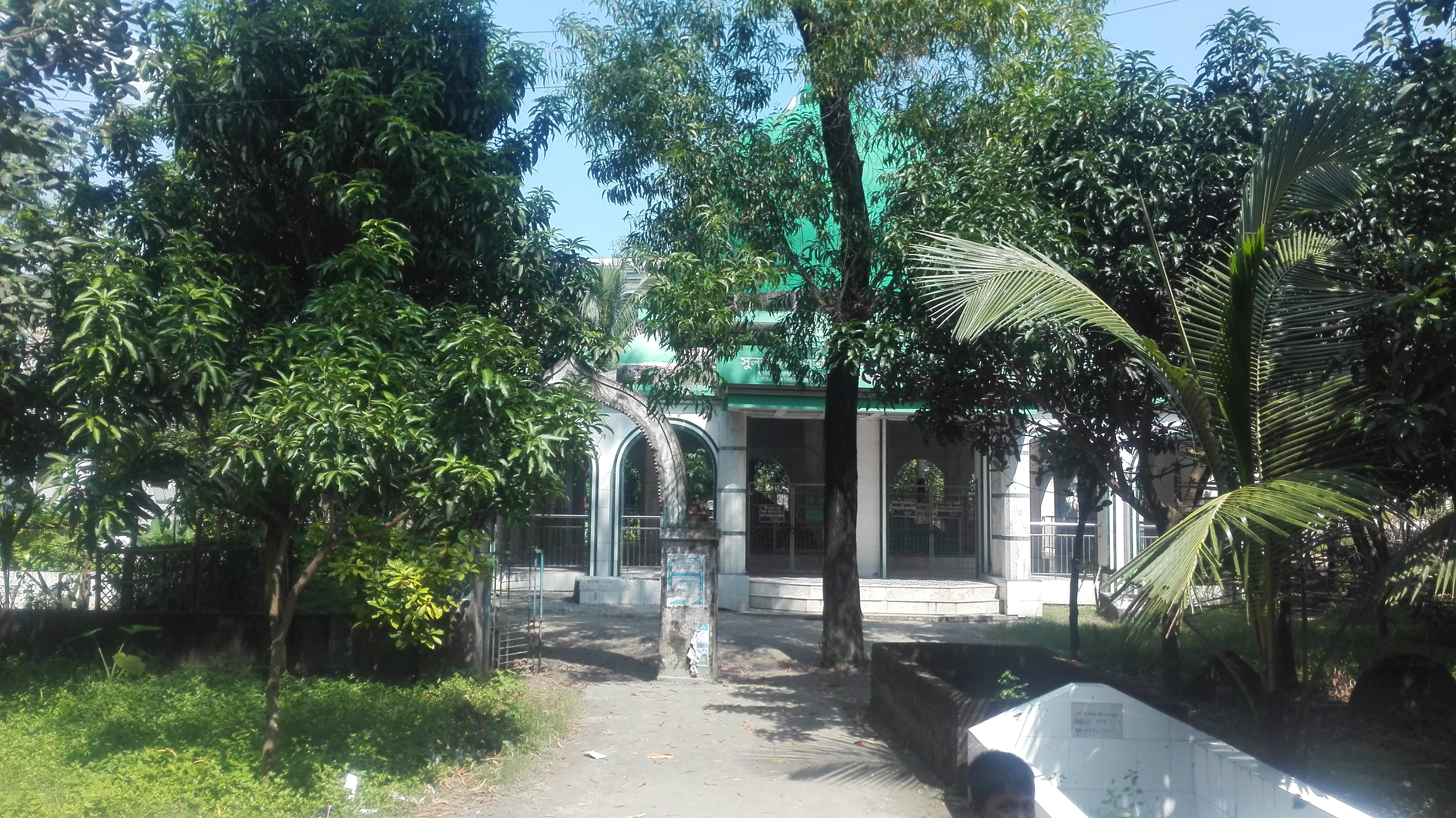
- Shrine of Shah Kabir

- Location of Uttarkhan Uttarkhan (Dhaka division) Uttarkhan (Bangladesh)
- Coordinates: 23.880082°N 90.443788°E
- Country: Bangladesh
- Division: Dhaka Division
- District: Dhaka District
- City Corporation: DNCC

Area
  - Total: 35 km^{2} (14 sq mi)

Population
  - Total: 126,149
  - Density: 3,600/km^{2} (9,300/sq mi)
- Time zone: UTC+6 (BST)
- Postal code: 1230

Uttarkhan is a neighborhood in Dhaka, the capital of Bangladesh. It is located opposite the Hazrat Shahjalal International Airport. It extends from Abdullahpur in the west to the Termukh Bridge in the east in the northern part of Dhaka.

== Location ==
Surrounded by the Turag and Balu Rivers, Uttarkhan is bordered on the north by Gazipur Sadar Upazila, on the south by Dakshinkhan, on the west by Khilkhet, and on the east by Kaliganj Upazila. On the opposite side lies the Hazrat Shahjalal International Airport.

== History ==
It is said that the Islamic preacher Shah Kabir settled in this area in 1601, having come from a place called Utrekhtan in the Indian subcontinent. For this reason, the place was named Uttarkhan. In the past, it was an administrative union under Dhaka District, which was divided into 16 wards. In 2006, a police station was established for the neighbourhood. Later, in 2015, a decision was made to merge it with the Dhaka North City Corporation. After the expansion of the corporation's boundaries, the union was divided into 3 wards. The area, which had long been deprived of infrastructural development, experienced significant urbanization after being incorporated into Dhaka North on 26 July 2017. Around the same time, for the construction of the Purbachal Expressway, the Bangladesh Army built roads in Uttarkhan to facilitate construction work, which improved the area's transport system. In 2022, according to the Detailed Area Plan prepared by the Capital Development Authority, a proposal was made to construct an eco-park and a water park in Uttarkhan.

== Administrative divisions ==
Uttarkhan is composed of the following areas:

Ward	Area
44	Dakshinpara, Aktartek, Purba Para, Ratuti, Bhaturia, Barordi, Karimerbag, Poradia, Uttarpara, Amaiya, Dobadia, Burirtek
45	Alinagar, Uttarkhan, Gazipara, Sarkarpara, Kanipara
46	Snanghat, Khajardia, Moynartek, Purba Para, Kumarkhola, Alampur, Chandpara, Chanpara, Palartek, Munda, Masterpara

== Demographics ==
Religions in Uttarkhan Thana (2022)
Religion	Percent
Islam	96.48%
Hinduism	3.02%
Christianity	0.48%
Other or not stated	0.03%

According to the 2022 Bangladeshi census, Uttarkhan Thana had 33,885 households and a population of 126,149. 8.13% of the population were under 5 years of age. Uttarkhan had a literacy rate (age 7 and over) of 85.30%: 87.25% for males and 83.20% for females, and a sex ratio of 107.95 males for every 100 females.
