= BAF Shaheen College Dhaka =

Educational institution in Dhaka, Bangladesh

- বিএএফ শাহীন কলেজ ঢাকা
- Seal of BAF Shaheen College Dhaka

Location
- Birsreshto Shaheed Jahangir Gate, Dhaka Cantonment, BAF Base Bashar; Dhaka 1206; Bangladesh; 23°46′37.5″N 90°23′27.5″E

Information
- Other name: BAFSD; Dhaka Shaheen; Bangladesh Air Force Shaheen College Dhaka
- Former names: Shaheen School; PAF Shaheen School; Shaheen High School; BAF Shaheen College Tejgaon
- Type: School and College
- Motto: Bengali: শিক্ষা-সংযম-শৃঙ্খলা (Education-Restraint-Discipline)
- Patron saint: Chief of Air Staff
- Established: 1 March 1960; 66 years ago
- Founder: Pakistan Air Force
- Sister school: BAF Shaheen Colleges
- Authority: Bangladesh Air Force (Note: with civil representatives)
- School code: School Code-1272; College Code-1051; EIIN-107858
- Principal: Group Captain Santanu Chowdhury, GUP, BUP, acsc, psc
- Faculty: Science, Business Studies, Humanities
- Teaching staff: 436
- Grades: KG to 12th
- Gender: co-ed
- Enrollment: 13546 (as of year 2026)
- Education system: National Curriculum of Bangladesh
- Language: Bangla and English
- Campus type: Urban
- Houses: Isa Khan House; Titumir House; Sher-e-Bangla House; Nazrul House
- Colors: Uniform: Boys: Sky blue Khaki; Girls: Sky blue White
- Sports: Football, cricket, squash, basketball, volleyball, table tennis, hockey, badminton, handball
- Yearbook: Abahon (Note: Bengali: আবাহন)
- Affiliation: Directorate of Secondary and Higher Education
- Alumni name: Ex Shaheen
- Board: Dhaka Education Board
- Alumni association name: Ex Shaheens' Association Dhaka - ESAD
- Demonym: Shaheens
- Website: bafsd.edu.bd

BAF Shaheen College Dhaka (Note: Bengali: বিএএফ শাহীন কলেজ ঢাকা, romanized: Bi'ē'ēpha śāhīna kalēja ḍhākā) also known as BAFSD or Dhaka Shaheen is a co-educational Bangladeshi college (grades KG-XII) established and managed by the Bangladesh Air Force, (Note: Multiple references:) primarily for the children of Air Force personnel. Civilians' children can also study at the college.

== History ==
The institution was established by Pakistan Air Force near Tejgaon Airport, East Pakistan now Birsreshto Shaheed Jahangir Gate, Dhaka Cantonment, Tejgaon, Dhaka, Bangladesh on 1 March 1960 for the children of the Air Force personnel as Shaheen School, an English-medium school. Later in 1967, Bengali medium was introduced along with English medium. Since the Bangladesh Liberation War in 1971, The Bangladesh Air Force has been running this educational institution. Meanwhile, Shaheen School was renamed as "Shaheen High School" and within a few years was recognized by the Dhaka Education Board. In the academic year 1977-78 Shaheen High School was renamed "BAF Shaheen College Dhaka" for the purpose of upgrading it to a higher secondary college. Degree (pass course) was introduced in the academic year 1990-91 and since then BAF Shaheen College Dhaka continues to function as a degree college. However, the degree was abolished from the academic year 2006–07. Later, English version curriculum was also introduced. In the year 2008, an alumni association was formed, namely the Ex Shaheens' Association Dhaka (ESAD). BAF Shaheen School and College gets its name from the Bangladesh Air Force (BAF) and the word "Shaheen", which means "falcon" in Persian and Urdu. In the 2024 quota reform movement, a student of this college named Shafiq Uddin Ahmed Ahnaf martyred by the fascist administration, during the protest.

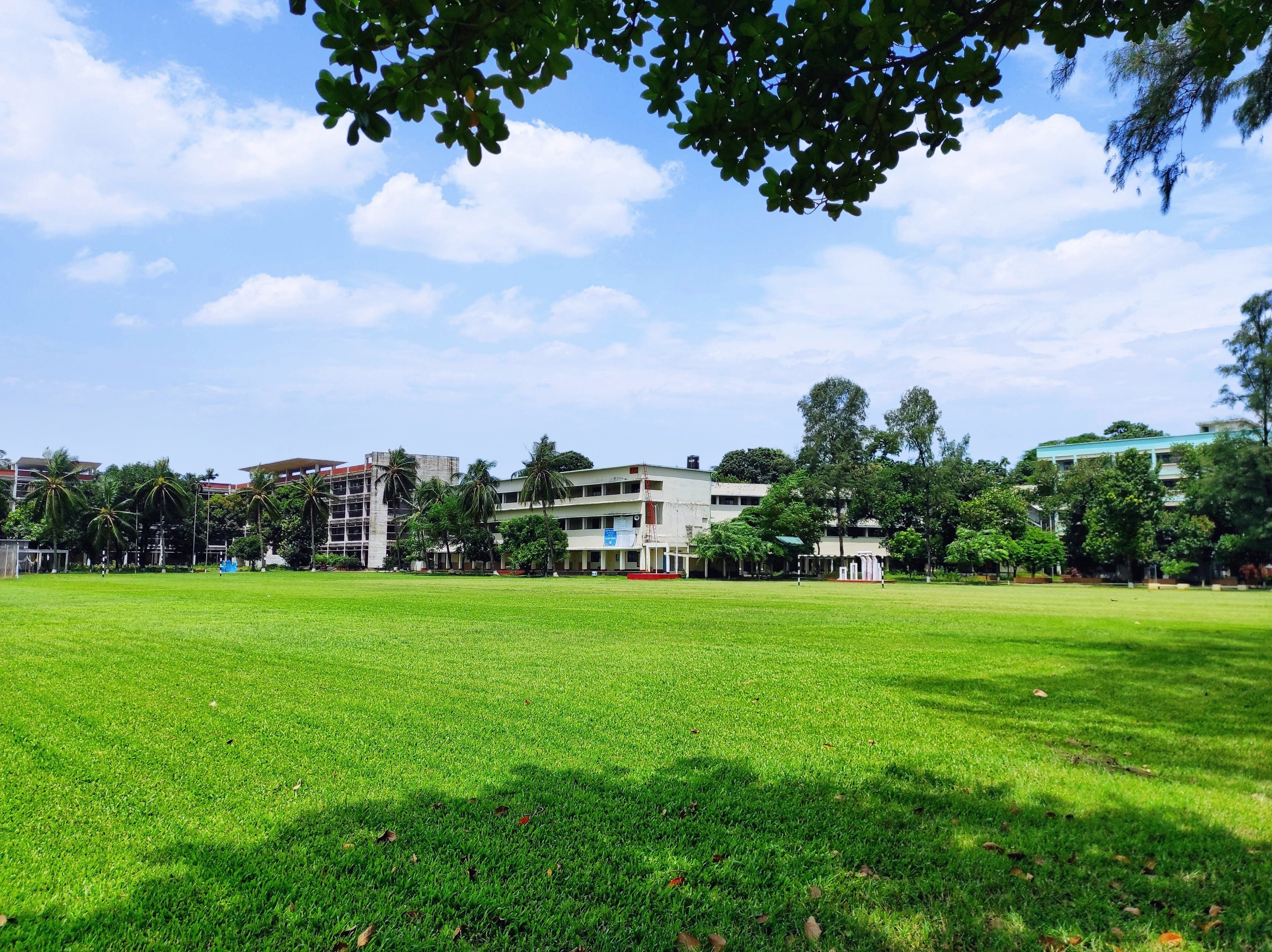
BAF Shaheen College Dhaka Main Playground

== Academics ==
Teaching is done in Bengali and English. The institution has three parts:

- Primary Division (KG to Class V)
- Junior Secondary and Secondary (Class VI to X)
- College (Class XI and XII)

Shaheen School Authority releases an admission circular for KG class every year and sometimes others classes also with morning and day shift (both an English version and Bengali-medium), on the other hand the college authority publishes an admission circular every year after the publication of the Secondary School Certificate results. New students (both boys and girls) are admitted to the 11th grade via online applications. They are admitted to the college according to the merit list based on their obtained marks in the SSC examinations. The children of BAF personnel have a special quota for admission.

== Hockey field ==
BAF Shaheen College Dhaka hockey field in Dhaka is the home ground for BAF Shaheen College Dhaka Hockey Team. It is the only institutional hockey ground in Bangladesh to contain artificial turf. Several national-level tournaments and inter-Shaheen tournaments are held there every year. It was constructed in 2014 to provide better infrastructural facilities to its hockey team and giving opportunities at the school and college level to arrange tournaments of international standard. Its construction began in December 2014. It was opened at the end of that month, making it the first artificial hockey turf of institutional level in Bangladesh.

== Extracurricular clubs ==
The college has more than 18 extracurricular clubs.

== Notable alumni ==
- Tarique Rahman, Prime minister of Bangladesh and politician
- Sheikh Rehana Siddiq, daughter of Sheikh Mujibur Rahman
- Sheikh Kamal, son of Sheikh Mujibur Rahman
- Sheikh Jamal, son of Sheikh Mujibur Rahman
- Atiqul Islam, politician and former Dhaka North mayor
- Shampa Reza, singer, actress
- Kazi Salahuddin, former footballer
- Meher Afroz Shaon, actress, director and playback singer
- Aupee Karim, actress, model, architect and dancer
- Khaled Mahmud, former cricketer and coach
- Hasan Masood, actor, former journalist and military officer
- Arafat Rahman, son of Ziaur Rahman
- Safa Kabir, actress and model
- Amitabh Reza Chowdhury, filmmaker
- Munni Begum, singer
- Alamgir Haq, singer
- Sarjis Alam, activist
- Nazir Ahmed Alok, former footballer
- Atikul Alam Shawon, Member of Parliament
- Sanjida Islam Tulee, politician and human rights activist

== Notable faculty ==
- Dilara Zaman, actress
