= Ferdous Ahmed Qureshi =

Bangladeshi politician (1941–2020)

- ফেরদৌস আহমদ কোরেশী

President of Progressive Democratic Party
- In office 7 June 2007 – 31 August 2020

Personal details
- Born: 14 January 1941 Chittagong, Bengal Presidency
- Died: 31 August 2020 (aged 79) Dhaka Cantonment: British-Indian (1941-1948); Pakistani (1948-1971); Bangladeshi (1971-2020)
- Party: Progressive Democratic Party
- Other political affiliations: Bangladesh Nationalist Party (until 2007)
- Spouse: Nilufar Panna Qureshi

Ferdous Ahmed Qureshi (Bengali: ফেরদৌস আহমদ কোরেশি; 1941–2020) was a Bangladeshi politician and chairman of the Progressive Democratic Party.

== Early life ==
Ferdous Ahmed Qureshi was born in 1941 to a Bengali Muslim family in Chittagong, Bengal Presidency (now Bangladesh).

== Career ==
Qureshi served as president of the student political organization East Pakistan Chhatra League from 1967 to 1968.

During the Bangladesh Liberation War he edited the Daily Deshbangla newspaper. After the war, he led a faction of the Jatiya Janata Party. The party merged with the Bangladesh Nationalist Party (BNP) in May 1980, and Qureshi became joint secretary general of the BNP.

In 2004 he formed the Green Party of Bangladesh. During the rule of the caretaker government from 2007 to 2009 he called for the formation of alternate parties to be created in Bangladesh.

He formed the Progressive Democratic Party in July 2007. He joined the Jatiya Jukta Front, an alliance of political parties to compete in the parliamentary elections in 2008. The alliance broke up in the same year. He was the chairman of the PDP until his death.
