= Akhtar Hossain Bhuiyan =

Bangladeshi government official

- আখতার হোসেন ভূইয়া

Secretary of Defence, Bangladesh
- In office 1 January 2017 – 31 December 2019
- Preceded by: Kazi Habibul Awal
- Succeeded by: Abdullah Al Mohsin Chowdhury

Personal details
- Born: 31 December 1959 (age 66) Dhamrai, Dhaka District, East Pakistan, Pakistan
- Citizenship: Bangladesh
- Occupation: Government official
- Known for: Serving as the Secretary of the Ministry of Defence

Akhtar Hossain Bhuiyan (born 31 December 1959) is a retired civil servant who served as the Secretary of the Ministry of Defence from 1 January 2017 to 31 December 2019. He had served under Prime Minister Sheikh Hasina. As Secretary, he was the chief executive and administrative officer of the ministry, overseeing its affiliated agencies and departments.

== Early life ==
Bhuiyan was born on 31 December 1959 in Balia village, Dhamrai Upazila, Dhaka District, Bangladesh. He completed his secondary education in 1975 and higher secondary education in 1977. He earned a master's degree in economics at Jahangirnagar University in 1982.

== Career ==
Bhuiyan joined the Bangladesh Civil Service as an Administration Cadre in 1986. Over the years, he served in various administrative positions, including Executive Magistrate, Senior Assistant Secretary, and Deputy Secretary.

In 2009, Bhuiyan was promoted to joint secretary from deputy secretary while serving as the deputy secretary of the Economic Relations Division.

He also briefly served as the Administrator of Dhaka North City Corporation in 2013. He was then appointed Director General of the Bureau of Non-Formal Education.

On 1 January 2017, by an official government order, he was appointed as the Acting Secretary of the Ministry of Defence, replacing Kazi Habibul Awal. Later, on 10 July 2017, the Ministry of Public Administration issued a new order appointing him as the permanent Secretary of Defence. On 15 August 2019, he observed the National Mourning Day at the Ministry of Defence on the occasion of the assassination of Sheikh Mujibur Rahman.

He retired from government service on 31 December 2019.
