= Mohammad Azaz =

Bangladeshi activist

- মোহাম্মদ এজাজ
- Azaz in 2025

Administrator of North Dhaka
- In office 12 February 2025 – 9 February 2026
- Preceded by: Mohammed Mahmudul Hassan
- Succeeded by: Suraiya Akter Jahan

Personal details
- Occupation: Administrator

Mohammad Azaz (Bengali:মোহাম্মদ এজাজ) is a Bangladeshi environment activist. He served as the administrator of Dhaka North City Corporation. He was the chairman of River and Delta Research Center.

== Career ==
Azaz was the chairperson of River and Delta Research Center.

Azaz participated in a human chain for climate change in September 2023 along with Sultana Kamal, MS Siddiqui, M. Mustafa Kamal Akand, and Ibnul Said Rana. In October, he spoke at the Jatiya Press Club along with Professor Anisuzzaman, Ibnul Said Rana, and Suman Shams.

He was appointed a member of the central committee of the Anti-Discrimination Student Movement. He received the Mark Angelo River Award for research.

In February 2025, Azaz was appointed administrator of Dhaka North City Corporation by Muhammad Yunus—led interim government. The interim government terminated all 12 city corporation mayors, including Dhaka North City Corporation, and 1,873 elected representatives around the country. His predecessor, Atiqul Islam, was arrested by Detective Branch. In a meeting with journalists on 17 February 2025, Azaz outlined plans to improve drainage systems, recover canals to prevent waterlogging and enhance waste management. He also inaugurated a photo gallery titled "Immortal Memory of the July Uprising" at Gulshan Nagar Bhaban. He banned rickshaws from the main roads of Dhaka North.

In March 2025, Azaz met with Tracey Ann Jacobson, Ambassador of the United States to Bangladesh. He announced plans to install air purifiers in Dhaka to deal with air pollution.

In February 2026, Azaz got replaced by Surayya Akhter Jahan as the Administrator of Dhaka North City Corporation.
