= Badda Alatunnessa Higher Secondary School =

Badda Alatunnesa Higher Secondary School বাড্ডা আলাতুন্নেসা উচ্চ মাধ্যমিক বিদ্যালয়
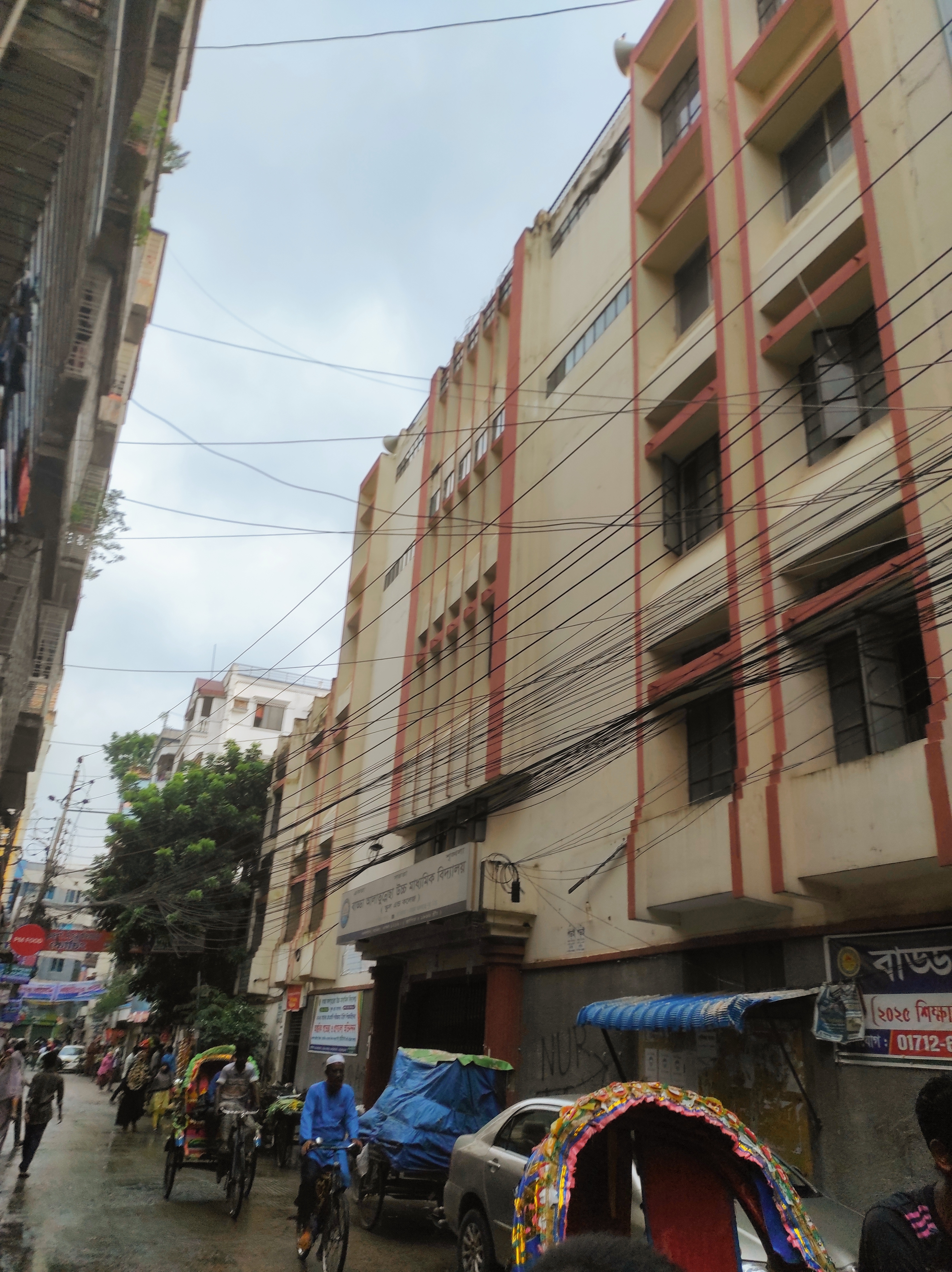
- School building

Location
- School Road, South Badda, Dhaka; Bangladesh
- Coordinates: 23.7767°N 90.4229°E

Information
- Type: Private
- Motto: একতা, সততা, শৃঙ্খলা (Unity, honesty, discipline)
- Established: 1963
- School code: 107841
- Faculty: 90
- Grades: 1st to 12th
- Enrollment: 2400
- Language: Bengali
- Campus type: Urban

Badda Alatunnesa Higher Secondary School is an educational institution in South Badda, Dhaka, Bangladesh. Alhaj Nur Mia established this institution in the name of his mother.. It offers classes up to higher secondary level.
