= Dhakshinkhan Thana =

Administrative area of Dhaka, Bangladesh

- Thana
- Interactive map of Dhakshinkhan Thana
- Location of Dhakshinkhan within Dhaka Location of Dhakshinkhan within Dhaka Division Location of Dhakshinkhan within Bangladesh
- Coordinates: 23.87443°N 90.41650°E
- Country: Bangladesh
- Division: Dhaka Division
- District: Dhaka District
- municipality: Dhaka Metropolitan Police North

Area
  - Total: 11.08 ha (27.4 acres)

Population (2022)
  - Total: 396,937
  - Density: 23,098/km^{2} (59,820/sq mi)
- Time zone: UTC+6 (BST)
- Postal code: 1230
- Area code: 02
- Website: dakshinkhanup.dhaka.gov.bd

Dhakshinkhan Thana is a thana of Dhaka city, Bangladesh.

== History ==
Dakshinkhan Thana was established in 2006. It is named after the erstwhile Dakshinkhan Adarsha Union Parishad.

== Geography ==
Gazipur Sadar Upazila is situated to the north of Dakshinkhan Thana, Khilkhet Thana to the south, Uttar Khan Thana to the east and Bimanbandar Thana to the west.

== Demographics ==
Religions in Dakshinkhan Thana (2011)
Religion	Percent
Islam	97.57%
Hinduism	2.14%
Other or not stated	0.29%

According to the 2011 Census of Bangladesh, Dakshinkhan Thana had 61,310 households with average household size of 3.99 and a population of 255,931. Males constituted 53.36% (136,572) of the population while females 46.64% (119,359). Dakshinkhan Thana had a literacy rate (age 7 and over) of 76.8%, compared to the national average of 51.8%, and a sex ratio of 114.There were 218 floating people in this jurisdiction.

The religious breakdown was Muslim 97.57% (249,718), Hindu 2.14% (5,484), Christian 0.23% (588), Buddhist 0.03% (80), and others 0.02% (61). The ethnic minority people living there were 236 persons in total.
