= Dakshinkhan =

Dakshinkhan দক্ষিনখান
- Neighbourhood
- Interactive map of Dakshinkhan
- Coordinates: 23°53′N 90°27′E
- Country: Bangladesh
- Division: Dhaka Division
- District: Dhaka District
- Body: Dhaka North

Area
  - Total: 15.68 km^{2} (6.05 sq mi)

Population (2022)
  - Total: 666,000
  - Density: 43,302/km^{2} (112,150/sq mi)
- Time zone: UTC+6 (BST)
- Postal Code: 1230
- Area code: 02

Dakshinkhan (Bengali: দক্ষিণখান, romanized: Dokkhinkhan) is a neighbourhood in Dhaka, Bangladesh. It was a union parishad of Dhaka District, which was merged into Dhaka North City Corporation in 2016, and is now a Thana. It is bounded by Gazipur Sadar Upazila on the north, Khilkhet on the south, Uttarkhan on the east and Uttara and Shahjalal International Airport on the west.

== History ==
Dakhkhinkhan Thana was formed in 2006. The thana was named after Dakshinkhan Adarsha Union Parishad. Later, in 2015, a decision was made to merge it with the Dhaka North City Corporation. It was dissolved in 2016 after it was integrated into Dhaka North City Corporation.

== Demographics ==
Religions in Dakkhinkhan Thana (2022)
Religion	Percent
Islam	97.51%
Hinduism	2.19%
Other or not stated	0.29%

According to the 2022 Bangladeshi census, Dakkhinkhan Thana had 108,255 households and a population of 396,942. 8.31% of the population were under 5 years of age. Dakkhinkhan had a literacy rate (age 7 and over) of 87.19%: 88.78% for males and 85.35% for females, and a sex ratio of 115.36 males for every 100 females.
