= 2015 Dhaka North City Corporation election =

Mayoral election in Bangladesh

- 30 April 2015
- Registered: 2,344,900
- Turnout: 37.70%
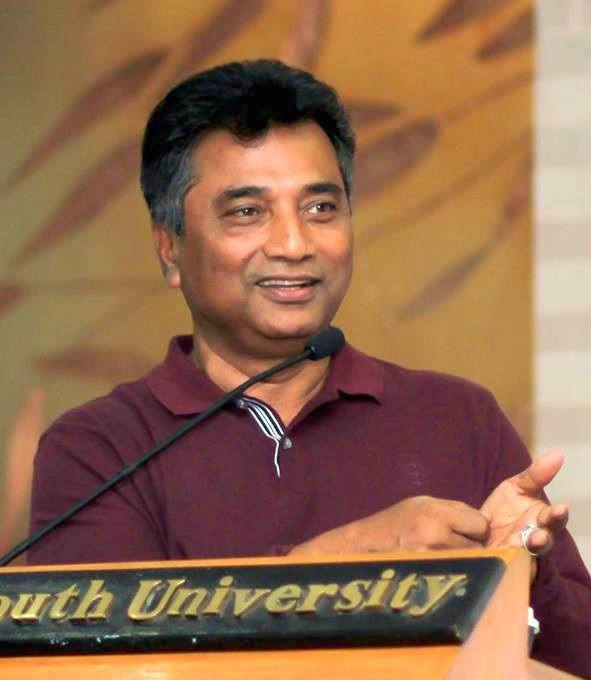

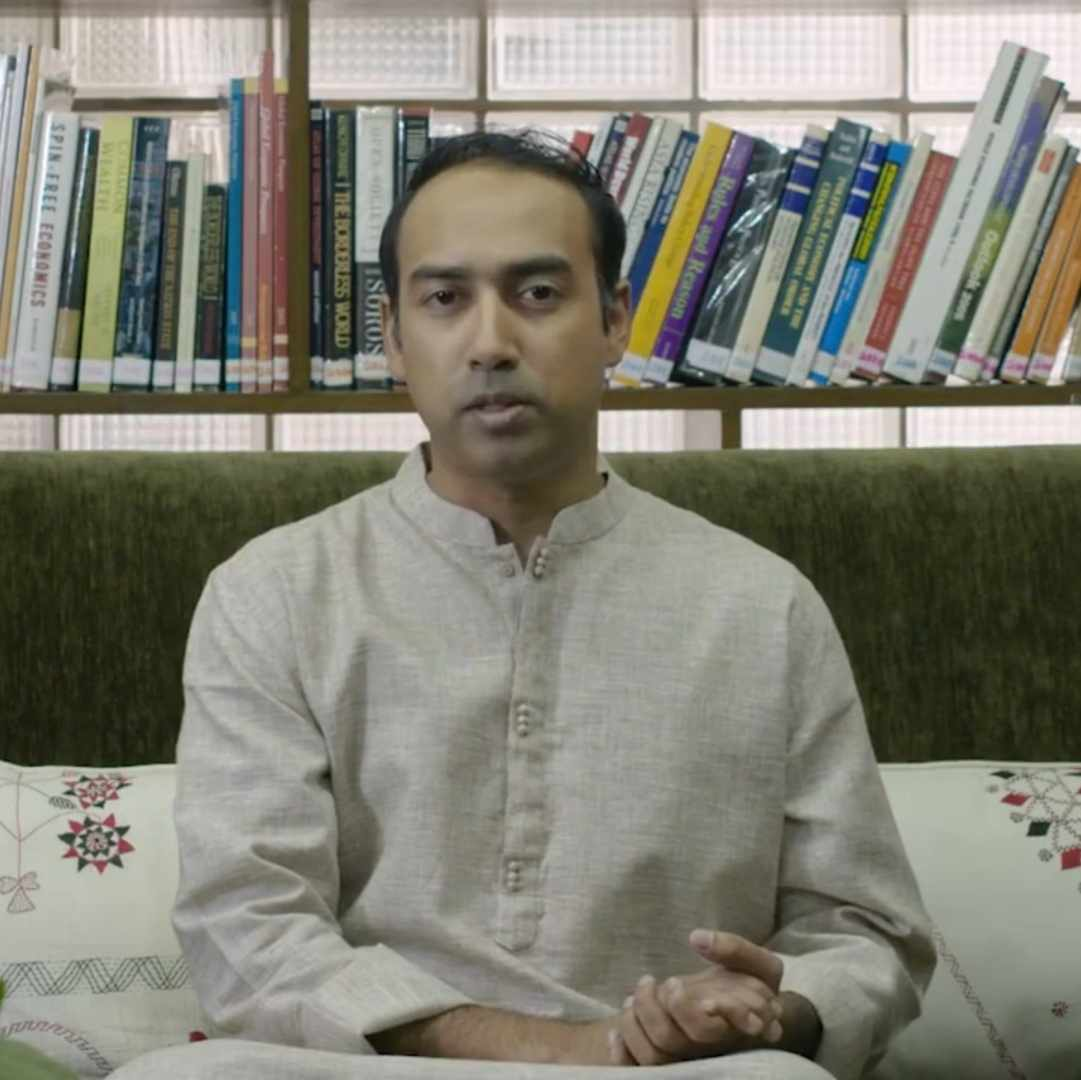
	First party	Second party
Candidate	Annisul Huq	Tabith Awal
Party	AL	BNP
Popular vote	460,117	325,080
Percentage	52.6%	37.16%
Swing	New	New
Mayor before election
New post
Elected Mayor
Annisul Huq
AL
- Council election
- 30 April 2015; 48 seats in the Dhaka North City Corporation
Party	Leader	Seats	+/–
AL	Annisul Huq	32	+32
BNP	Tabith Awal	2	+2
JP(E)	Bahauddin Ahmed	1	+1
Independent	—	13	+13
This lists parties that won seats. See the complete results below.

The 2015 Dhaka North City Corporation election was a local government election in the city of Dhaka, Bangladesh, held on 30 April 2015 to elect the Mayor of North Dhaka and the Dhaka North City Council. A total of 16 candidates participated in the election. The election resulted in a victory for the Awami League candidate Annisul Huq. In the 48 member City Council, the Awami League won 32 seats, while independents won 13 seats, the Bangladesh Nationalist Party won 2 seats, and the Jatiya Party (Ershad) won 1 seat. However, the results were rejected by the main opposition candidate, Tabith Awal of the Bangladesh Nationalist Party. The candidates received neutral election symbols in this election.

== Candidates ==
Candidate	Party	Symbol
Annisul Huq	Awami League	Table clock
Tabith Awal	Bangladesh Nationalist Party	Bus
Bahauddin Ahmed Sarkar	Jatiya Party	Elephant

== Mayoral election results ==
Candidate	Party	Votes	%
Annisul Huq	Awami League	460,117	52.61
Tabith Awal	Bangladesh Nationalist Party	325,080	37.17
Fazle Bari Masoud	Islami Andolan Bangladesh	18,050	2.06
Mahi B. Chowdhury	Bikalpa Dhara Bangladesh	13,407	1.53
Zonayed Saki	Ganosanhati Andolan	7,370	0.84
Bahauddin Ahmed	Jatiya Party (Ershad)	2,950	0.34
Abdullah Al Kafi	Communist Party of Bangladesh	2,475	0.28
Nader Chowdhury	Jatiyo Samajtantrik Dal	1,412	0.16
8 other candidates		10,139	1.16
Rejected ballots		33,581	3.84
Majority		135,037	15.44
Turnout		874,581	37.30
Registered voters		2,344,900	
AL gain (new seat)			
Source: BDN News 24

== Council election results ==
=== Party-wise ===
2015 DNCC council election results (party-wise)
Party	Leader	Councilor contested seats	Councilor elected in Seats	Ward Councilors	Reserved Women Councilors
Bangladesh Awami League	Annisul Huq	48	32 / 48	21	11
Bangladesh Nationalist Party	Tabith Awal	48	2 / 48	2	0
Jatiya Party (Ershad)	Bahauddin Ahmed	unknown	1 / 48	1	0
Independent	unknown		13 / 48	12	1
Total			48	36	12
