= Bureau of Non-Formal Education =

Government bureau in Dhaka, Bangladesh

- Formation: 2005
- Headquarters: Dhaka, Bangladesh
- Region served: Bangladesh
- Official language: Bengali
- Website: Bureau of Non-Formal Education

Bureau of Non-Formal Education is a government bureau responsible for providing jobs, education, and opportunities to individuals who have not received formal education. The Bureau is located in Dhaka, Bangladesh. The Director General of Bureau of Non-Formal Education is Tapan Kumar Ghosh.

== History ==
The Bureau of Non-Formal Education traces its origin to the Directorate of Non-Formal Education. The Directorate of Non-Formal Education was under the Primary and Mass Education Division which was established in August 1992. The Directorate was placed in charge of Non-Formal Education programs providing services to 34.4 million illiterate people in Bangladesh. The Directorate of Non-Formal Education was dissolved in 2005 and replaced with the Bureau of Non-Formal Education. The Total Literacy Movement, which was founded in 1996 was dissolved in 2003, had parts of its functions absorbed into the Bureau. The Government of Bangladesh allocated Basic Literacy and Continuing Education project one and two to the bureau with a budget of 30 billion taka.
