= Bimanbandar Thana, Dhaka =

Administrative area of Dhaka, Bangladesh

Bimanbandar Thana বিমান বন্দর থানা
- Thana
- Interactive map of Bimanbandar Thana
- Location of Bimanbandar Thana within Dhaka Location of Bimanbandar Thana within Dhaka Division Location of Bimanbandar Thana within Bangladesh
- Coordinates: 23.8509°N 90.4109°E
- Country: Bangladesh
- Division: Dhaka Division
- District: Dhaka District

Area
  - Total: 8.02 km^{2} (3.10 sq mi)
- Elevation: 23 m (75 ft)

Population (2022)
  - Total: 7,424
  - Density: 1,325/km^{2} (3,430/sq mi)
- Time zone: UTC+6 (BST)
- Postal code: 1229
- Area code: 02

Bimanbandar Thana is a thana of Dhaka City.

== History ==
Bimanbandar Thana was created in 2001. It is composed of parts of Ward no. 1, Ward no. 98, and Dakkhinkhan.

== Geography ==
It is bounded by Pallabi, Uttara, and Dhakshinkhan Thana to the north, Khilkhet and Cantonment thanas to the south, Khilkhet and Dakshinkhan thanas to the east, and Cantonment and Pallabi thanas to the west.

== Demographics ==
Religions in Bimanbandar Thana (2022)
Religion	Percent
Islam	95.22%
Hinduism	4.59%
Other or not stated	0.19%

According to the 2022 Bangladeshi census, Bimanbandar Thana had 1,739 households and a population of 7,424. 4.73% of the population were under 5 years of age. Bimanbandar had a literacy rate (age 7 and over) of 96.14%: 97.21% for males and 94.64% for females, and a sex ratio of 136.13 males for every 100 females.

According to the 2011 Census of Bangladesh, Bimanbandar Thana had 2,120 households with an average household size of 4.10 and a population of 10,626. Males constituted 58.41% (6,207) of the population, while females constituted 41.59% (4,419). Bimanbandar Thana had a literacy rate (age 7 and over) of 82.7%, compared to the national average of 51.8%, and a sex ratio of 140. There were 39 floating people in the jurisdiction.

The religious breakdown was: Muslim 94.74% (10,067), Hindu 4.59% (488), Christian 0.28% (30), Buddhist 0.24% (25), and others 0.15% (16). 35 ethnic people were living there.
