= Badda Thana =

Thana in Dhaka North City Corporation, Bangladesh

Badda বাড্ডা
- Thana
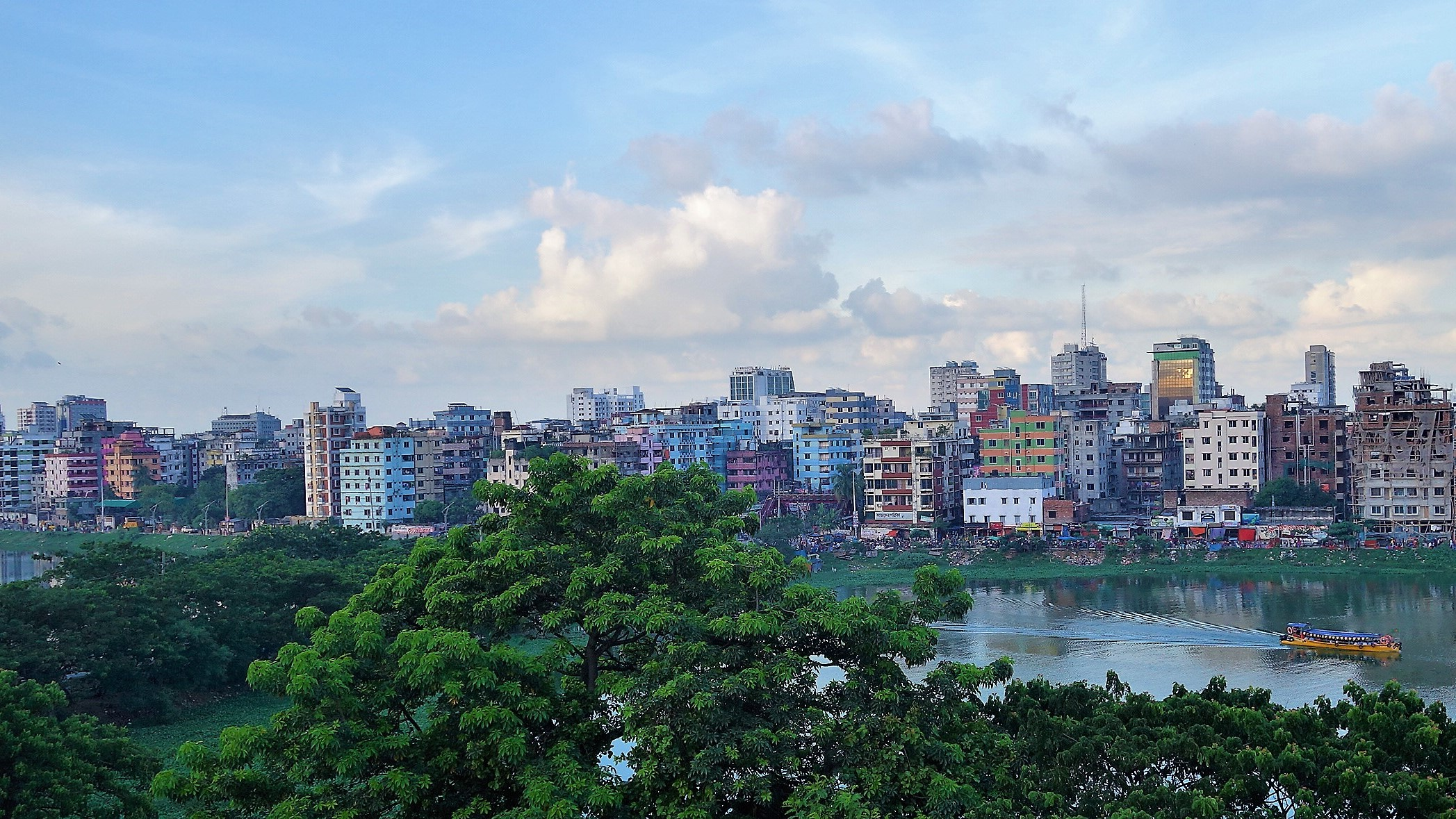
- South Badda overlooking Gulshan lake (2017)
- Interactive map of Badda
- Location of Badda within Dhaka Location of Badda within Dhaka Division Location of Badda within Bangladesh
- Coordinates: 23°46.3′N 90°25.6′E
- Country: Bangladesh
- Division: Dhaka Division
- District: Dhaka District

Area
  - Total: 36.84 km^{2} (14.22 sq mi)
- Elevation: 23 m (75 ft)

Population (2022)
  - Total: 375,598
  - Density: 10,200/km^{2} (26,410/sq mi)
- Time zone: UTC+6 (BST)
- Postal code: 1212
- Area code: 02
- Notable sport teams: Badda Jagoroni Sangsad

Badda (Bengali: বাড্ডা) is a thana (police jurisdiction) and township in Dhaka District in Dhaka, Bangladesh. Parts of the thana are under the administrative jurisdiction of Dhaka North City Corporation ward 21, and in part, ward 17, while the rest encompasses parts of the unions of Beraid, Badda, Bhatara, and Satarkul in Tejgaon Development Circle.

== Origins ==
Badda traces its roots back to the early 20th century. Despite its proximity to the upscale Gulshan area, it developed haphazardly due to its location outside the municipal boundaries of Dhaka for an extended period. The area east of Progoti Avenue is relatively newer, evolving during the 1950s and 1960s.

On 9 December 1998, Badda Thana was established, carved out from parts of Cantonment Thana and Gulshan Thana. It comprised the mouzas of Badda, Satarkul, and Beraid, the latter notable for housing multiple Mughal-era mosques.

== Geography ==
Badda Thana is located near the north-eastern part of Dhaka, at 23.77159°N 90.42741°E. It extends on both sides of Rampura Road and Progoti Avenue. Covering a total area of 36.84 km^{2} (14.22 sq mi), the thana shares its borders with Khilkhet Thana to the north, Khilgaon Thana to the south, Rupganj Upazila to the east, and Gulshan, Cantonment, and Rampura thanas to the west, as of 2012.

The Badda area includes Merul Badda, South Badda, Middle Badda, North Badda, and East Badda. To the north are Shahjadpur, Satarkul and Adarshanagar. To the east lie Tekpara, Rupnagar, Sutibhola, and Sonkatra. Gulshan Lake and Taltola lies to the west. Badda also has few sub areas with in its boaders like Adarsha Nagar and DIT project.

== Demographics ==
Religions in Badda Thana (2022)
Religion	Percent
Islam	95.20%
Hinduism	4.12%
Christianity	0.50%
Other or not stated	0.18%

According to the 2022 Bangladeshi census, Badda Thana had 103,427 households and a population of 375,604. 8.41% of the population were under 5 years of age. Badda had a literacy rate (age 7 and over) of 86.41%: 87.70% for males and 84.78% for females, and a sex ratio of 124.42 males for every 100 females.

According to the 2011 Census of Bangladesh, Badda Thana had 120,190 households with an average household size of 4.08 and a population of 536,621. Males constituted 56.32% (302,228) of the population while females 43.68% (234,393). Badda had a literacy rate (age 7 and over) of 72.3%, compared to the national average of 51.8%, and a sex ratio of 129.There were 495 floating people in this jurisdiction.

The religious breakdown was Muslim 95.13% (510,467), Hindu 3.69% (19,799), Christian 1.01% (5,427), Buddhist 0.14% (727), and others 0.03% (201). The ethnic minority people living there were 1,680 persons in total.

== Education ==
Now there are a few private universities built in Badda, like BRAC University, United International University, Canadian University of Bangladesh and Dhaka International University. According to Banglapedia, Badda Alatunnessa Higher Secondary School, Satarkul School and College, Novation Model School and Cambrian School and College, are notable higher secondary schools. And notable primary schools include Siraj Mia Memorial Model School. Badda Thana has dozens of private kinder garden schools, few law schools, and

several government primary schools.

== See also ==
- Thanas of Bangladesh
- Districts of Bangladesh
- Divisions of Bangladesh
- Upazila
- Administrative geography of Bangladesh
