= Tabith Awal =

President of Bangladesh Football Federation

- তাবিথ আউয়াল
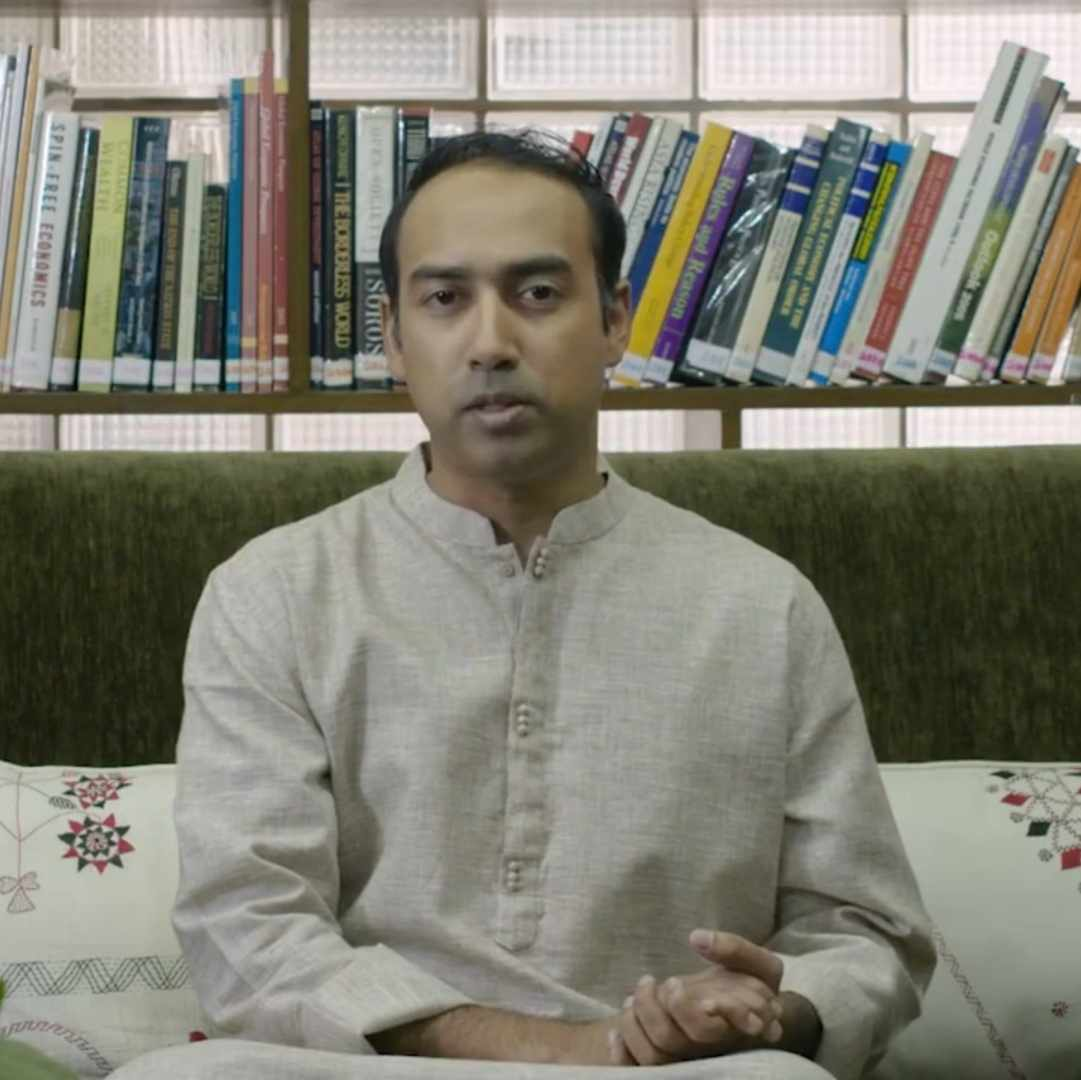
- Tabith Awal in 2020

President of Bangladesh Football Federation
- Incumbent
- Assumed office 26 October 2024
- Vice President: Imrul Hasan
- Preceded by: Kazi Salahuddin

Personal details
- Born: 20 February 1979 (age 47) Dhaka, Bangladesh
- Party: Bangladesh Nationalist Party
- Spouse: Sausar Iskander Awal
- Parents: Abdul Awal Mintoo (father); Nasreen Fatema Awal (mother)
- Education: George Washington University
- Website: tabithawal.com

Tabith Mohammed Awal (Bengali: তাবিথ মোহাম্মদ আউয়াল; born 20 February 1979) is a Bangladeshi activist, businessman. He is currently serving as the president of Bangladesh Football Federation (BFF). He is the son of politician Abdul Awal Mintoo.

== Early life and education ==
Tabith Mohammed Awal was born on 20 February 1979 in a Muslim family of Bangladesh. His father, Abdul Awal Mintoo, a businessman of Bangladesh and Mother, Nasreen Fatema Awal, is known as a social worker. Tabith is the oldest of two brothers, Tafsir Mohammed Awal and Tajwar Mohammed Awal.

Tabith graduated from George Washington University, in Washington, DC, United States. There he obtained combined degree in BBA in Management Information System and M.Sc. in Information System Technology.

== Career ==
=== Political career ===
Tabith is a Bangladesh Nationalist Party (BNP) politician and was the mayoral candidate of BNP in Dhaka North City Corporation 2015 and 2020 elections.

=== Football career ===
==== Player ====
Tabith played football at both semi-professional and professional level in the Dhaka Premier Division League and Bangladesh Premier League, representing Rahmatganj MFS, Arambagh KS, Fakirerpool YMC and his self-owned, Feni Soccer Club.

==== Administrator ====
Tabith was elected as one of the youngest Vice Presidents of the Bangladesh Football Federation (BFF) in 2012. Tabith also served as the Chairman of the BFF Tournaments Committee. However, he lost his position to Mohiuddin Mohi in the 2020 BFF elections, with Mohi securing 67 votes—three more than Tabith. Tabith previously owned Feni Soccer Club but later dissolved it to form NoFeL SC, a club representing Noakhali, Feni and Lakhsmipur, where he serves as president.

On 26 October 2024, Tabith secured 123 votes against 5 secured by his contestant, AFM Mizanur Rahman, to be elected the President of BFF.
