= Khilkhet Thana =

Thana in Dhaka North City Corporation, Bangladesh

Khilkhet Thana খিলক্ষেত থানা
- Thana
- Interactive map of Khilkhet Thana
- Location of Khilkhet Thana within Dhaka Location of Khilkhet Thana within Dhaka Division Location of Khilkhet Thana within Bangladesh
- Coordinates: 23.83113°N 90.42431°E
- Country: Bangladesh
- Division: Dhaka Division
- District: Dhaka District
- Established: 2005

Area
  - Total: 15.88 km^{2} (6.13 sq mi)
- Elevation: 23 m (75 ft)

Population (2022)
  - Total: 176,427
  - Density: 8,190/km^{2} (21,200/sq mi)
- Time zone: UTC+6 (BST)
- Postal code: 1229
- Area code: 02

Khilkhet Thana (Bengali: খিলক্ষেত থানা) is a thana (police station) of Dhaka, Bangladesh. It was established in 2005.

== Geography ==
Khilkhet Thana has a total area of 15.88 square kilometres (6.13 sq mi). It is bounded on the east by the Turag River (across which lies Rupganj Upazila of Narayanganj District). It borders Dhakshinkhan and Uttar Khan thanas to the north, Badda Thana to the south, Cantonment Thana to the west, and Bimanbandar Thana to the northwest.

== History ==
Administration of Khilkhet Thana was established on 27 June in 2005 that consists of southern parts of Badda thana. Before, this area was under the administration of Badda thana.

== Demographics ==
Religions in Khilkhet Thana (2022)
| Religion | Percent |
| Islam | 96.00% |
| Hinduism | 3.63% |
| Other or not stated | 0.37% |

According to the 2022 Bangladeshi census, Khilkhet Thana had 49,819 households and a population of 176,429. 7.94% of the population were under 5 years of age. Khilkhet had a literacy rate (age 7 and over) of 87.24%: 89.36% for males and 84.43% for females, and a sex ratio of 129.26 males for every 100 females.

According to the 2011 Census of Bangladesh, Khilkhet Thana had 31,141 households and a population of 130,053, all of whom lived in urban areas. 8.6% of the population was under the age of 5. The literacy rate (age 7 and over) was 73.8%, compared to the national average of 51.8%.

== Administration ==
Khilkhet Thana consists of part of Dhaka North City Corporation Ward No. 17, part of Dakshinkhan Union, and Dumni Union.

== Education ==
American International University-Bangladesh is located in this thana. There are two colleges in this thana. They are: Amirjan College located at Dumni, and Kurmitola High School and College, located in Khilkhet.

Kurmitola High School and College, popularly known as Khilkhet High School is the epicenter of modern education in these entire area which was established in 1948, while Amirjan College was established in 2012.

There are a number of schools in this thana. this thana has six high schools: Amirjan High School, Jan-E-Alam Sarker High School, Barua Alauddin Dewan High School, Dumni High School, Talna Ruhul Amin Khan High School And Jahid ikbal High School.

== Religious institutions ==
According to the information of Banglapedia, there are 67 mosques and 3 temples. Notable ones are: Dumni Nama Para Jame Masjid, Dumni Bazar Jame Masjid, Dumni Kali Mondir, Barua Shah Jame Masjid, Nikunja-2 central Jame Masjid.

== See also ==
- Badda Thana
- Cantonment Thana
- Bimanbandar
- Dhakshinkhan
- Uttarkhan
- Upazilas of Bangladesh
- Districts of Bangladesh
- Divisions of Bangladesh
