= Uttar Khan Thana =

Administrative area of Dhaka, Bangladesh

Uttar Khan Thana উত্তরখান থানা
- Thana
- Expandable map of vicinity of Uttar Khan Thana
- Location of Uttar Khan Thana within Dhaka Location of Uttar Khan Thana within Dhaka Division Location of Uttar Khan Thana within Bangladesh
- Coordinates: 23.88111°N 90.43857°E
- Country: Bangladesh
- Division: Dhaka Division
- District: Dhaka District
- Established: 1900

Area
  - Total: 20.09 km^{2} (7.76 sq mi)
- Elevation: 23 m (75 ft)

Population (2022)
  - Total: 126,149
  - Density: 3,929/km^{2} (10,180/sq mi)
- Time zone: UTC+6 (BST)
- Postal code: 1230
- Area code: 02

Uttar Khan is a Thana of Dhaka District in the Division of Dhaka, Bangladesh.

== Geography ==
The thana is bounded by Tongi Khal (canal) and Gazipur Sadar Upazila on the north, Khilkhet Thana and Dhakshinkhan Thana on the south, Balu River and Kaliganj on the east and Gazipur Sadar Upazila and Dhakshinkhan Thana on the west. Its area is 20.09 km^{2}. It is bounded by Tongi Khal (canal) and Gazipur Sadar Upazila on the north, Khilkhet and Dakshinkhan thanas on the south, Balu River and Kaliganj (Gazipur) upazila on the east, Gazipur Sadar upazila and Daskhinkhan thanas on the west.

== Demographics ==
According to 2011 Census of Bangladesh, Uttar Khan Thana has a population of 78,933 with average household size of 4.3 members, and an average literacy rate of 68.8% vs national average of 51.8% literacy.

== See also ==
- Upazilas of Bangladesh
- Districts of Bangladesh
- Divisions of Bangladesh
