= Progressive Democratic Party (Bangladesh) =

Bangladeshi political party

Progressive Democratic Party প্রগতিশীল গণতান্ত্রিক দল
- Founder: Ferdous Ahmed Qureshi
- Founded: 21 June 2007
- Headquarters: 8/4-A, Topkhana Road, Dhaka-1000
- Seats in Jatiya Sangsad: 0 / 350

Party flag
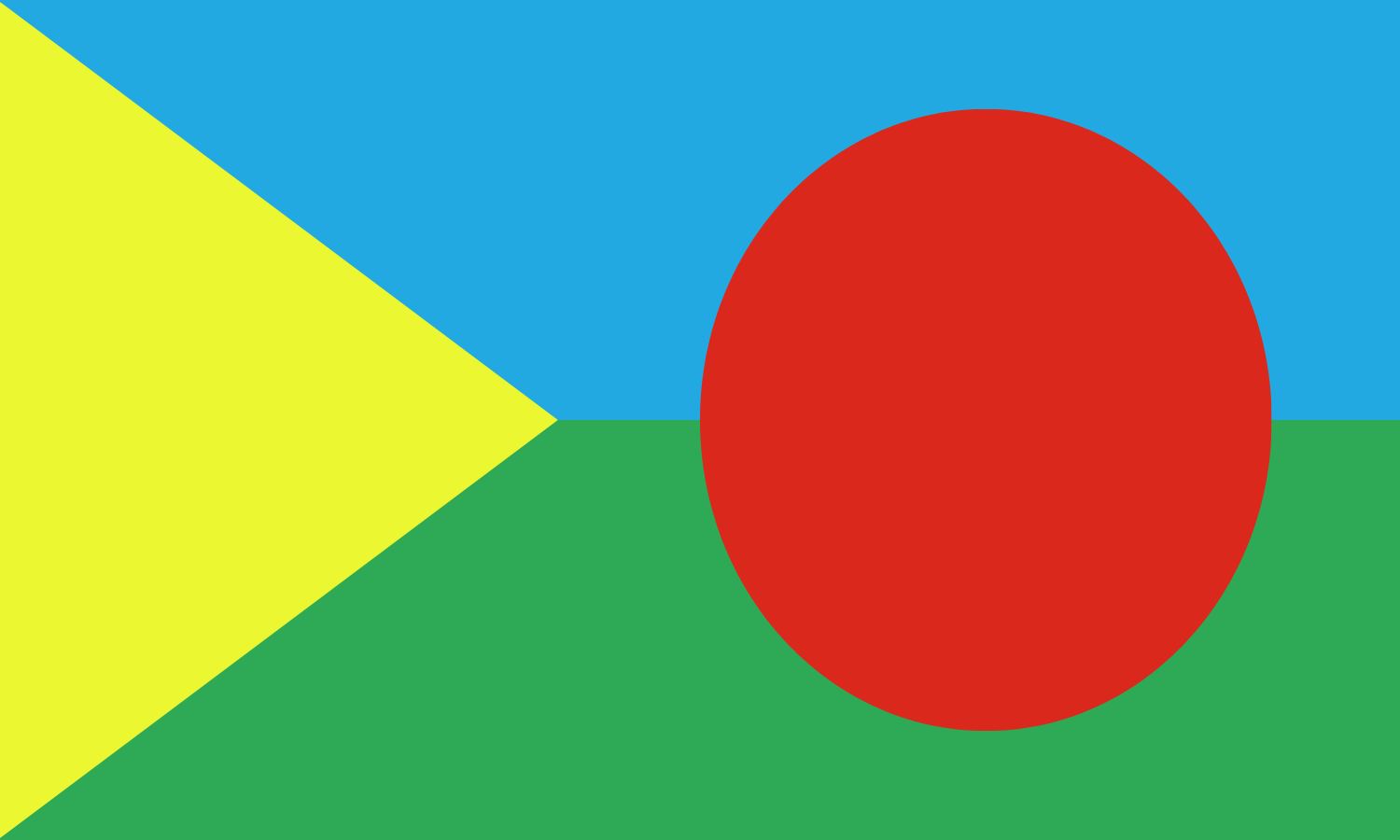

The Progressive Democratic Party (Bengali: প্রগতিশীল গণতান্ত্রিক দল) is a pro-democracy party in Bangladesh. It is popularly known as the PDP. This party was launched on 21 June 2007 though a press conference, as soon as limited indoor political activity was allowed, although open politics was prohibited at that time as the country was still under a state of emergency.

The founder and president of the party, Ferdous Ahmed Qureshi, died at the end of August 2020. The Bangladesh Election Commission cancelled the party's registration in November of that year for not having a functioning central committee or sufficient offices at district and lower levels to maintain registration.
