= Atiqul Islam =

Former Mayor of Dhaka North City Corporation

- আতিকুল ইসলাম
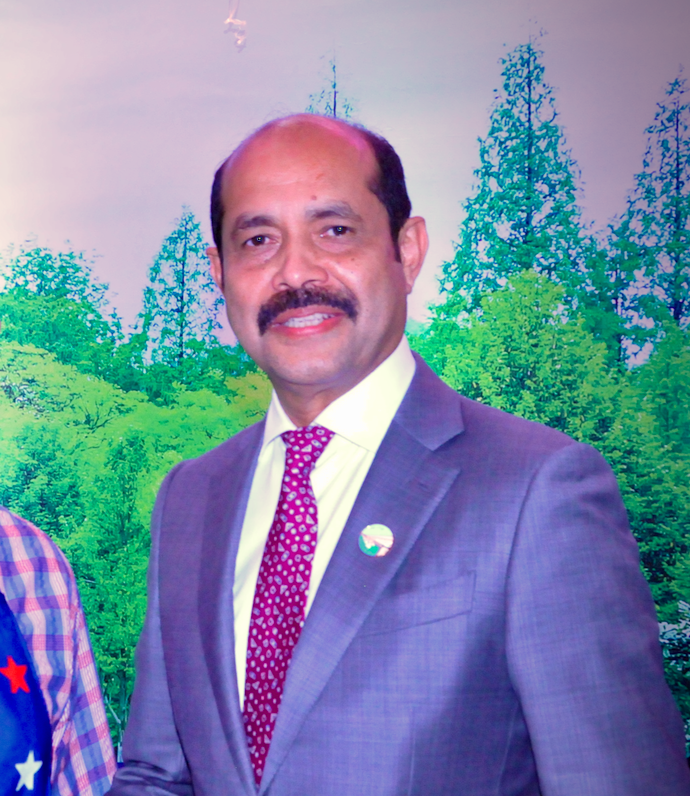
- Atiqul in 2022

2nd Mayor of North Dhaka
- In office 7 March 2019 – 19 August 2024
- Preceded by: Md. Jamal Mostafa; as Acting Mayor
- Succeeded by: Mohammed Mahmudul Hassan; as Administrator

Personal details
- Born: 1 July 1961 (age 65) Saidpur, Nilphamari, East Pakistan
- Party: Bangladesh Awami League
- Spouse: Shaila Shagufta Islam
- Relations: Md Tafazzul Islam (brother); Md Mainul Islam (brother)
- Children: Bushra Afreen (daughter)
- Education: BAF Shaheen College Dhaka
- Known for: Businessman, politician

Atiqul Islam (Bengali: আতিকুল ইসলাম; born 1 July 1961) is a Bangladeshi politician, businessman, and the former Mayor of North Dhaka. He was elected to the position in the by-election held on 28 February 2019 and took oath on 7 March. Earlier, he served as the president of the Bangladesh Garment Manufacturers and Exporters Association (BGMEA) during 2013–14.

== Early life ==
Atiqul Islam was born on 1 July 1961 at Saidpur of Nilphamari District to Momtajuddin Ahmed and Majeda Khatun. His hometown is Daudkandi in Comilla District, but at the time of his birth, his father was posted at Saidpur. He is the youngest among his 11 siblings. He completed his secondary and higher secondary education at BAF Shaheen College Dhaka.

== Career ==
Atiqul Islam and his elder brother Shafiqul started a business in the garment sector of Bangladesh by establishing Islam Garments in 1985. He served as the president of the Bangladesh Garment Manufacturers and Exporters Association (BGMEA) for the year 2013–14. He is serving as the president of the Centre of Excellence for Bangladesh Apparel Industry, which is responsible for improving the labor situation and product quality of Bangladesh in garment sectors. The government of Bangladesh declared him a Commercially Important Person (CIP) on several occasions.

In September 2022, the government broke the trustee board of Manarat International University and created a new board with Islam appointed chairman.

After the fall of the Awami League government, Islam went to the DNCC office in Gulshan on 18 August. As protesters gathered in front of the building, he reportedly escaped through the fire escape stairs behind Nagar Bhaban to avoid confrontation. On 19 August 2024, Islam was removed from the mayor's position by the government.

On 16 October 2024, Islam was arrested by police in the Mohakhali DOHS area in Dhaka. Dhaka Metropolitan Police deputy commissioner (media) Talebur Rahman confirmed the arrest, stating that Atiqul was taken into custody by members of the Mohammadpur police station around 7:00 pm. Talebur further mentioned that Atiqul is accused in several cases filed with the Mohammadpur police station, including three cases related to murder charges.

== Personal life and family ==
Atiqul Islam is married to a dental surgeon, Shaila Shagufta Islam, and the couple has a daughter, Bushra Afreen. Atiqul Islam's father, Momtajuddin Ahmed, was a police officer who retired as Superintendent of Police (SP) in 1965. His brother Md. Tafazzul Islam served as the 17th Chief Justice of Bangladesh, and another brother, Md Mainul Islam, is a retired lieutenant general of the Bangladesh Army and former principal staff officer of the Armed Forces Division, Chief of General Staff (CGS) of the Bangladesh Army and Director General of Border Guards Bangladesh.
