= Rapid Pass =

Smart card fare system in Bangladesh

- Native name: র‍্যাপিড পাস
- Location: Dhaka, Bangladesh
- Launched: 4 January 2018
- Technology: Near field communication; Contactless smart card
- Operator: Dhaka Transport Coordination Authority
- Manager: Dhaka Transport Coordination Authority
- Currency: BDT (৳100 minimum load, ৳10000 maximum load)
- Stored-value: e-purse
- Credit expiry: None
- Auto recharge: No
- Validity: Dhaka MRT; Dhaka BRT; BRTC; BIWTA
- Retailed: 34 branches and sub branches of Dutch-Bangla Bank
- Website: rapidpass.com.bd

The Rapid Pass is a smart card automated fare collection system based on near-field communication (NFC) technology used on participating public transit systems in Dhaka, the capital of Bangladesh. Rapid Pass card readers were implemented on a trial basis in 2017. Full implementation began in January 2018 and it was rolled out across rapid transit stations, railway stations, bus stops and terminals, and transit vehicles on many different transit systems.

== History ==
Old design of Rapid Pass card

In 2014, Dhaka Transport Coordination Authority (DTCA) took up a project to develop an automated fare collection system for Dhaka city at a cost of ৳39.06 crore. Japan International Cooperation Agency provided technical assistance and 73% of the total budget for the project. The authority concerned decided to introduce Rapid Pass service on trial basis for buses operated by Bangladesh Road Transport Corporation plying on Abdullahpur–Motijheel route in the city in May 2017. Sheikh Hasina, prime minister of the country, inaugurated the card service of the Rapid Pass on 4 January 2018. The project was said to be completed in 2019, which was in the process of setting up a clearing house bank for multiple transport services which was implemented by Dutch-Bangla Bank. In the meeting on bus route rationalization organized on 21 June 2022, it was decided to ensure the use of Rapid Pass in all modes of transport in Dhaka. From September 2023, Bangladesh Road Transport Corporation decided to implement Rapid Pass for all bus transport services operated by them. On 20 March 2024, the facility of collecting fares through Rapid Pass was introduced in BRTC buses operating on Dhaka–Narayanganj link road. In May 2024, the Road Transport and Highways Division drafted the "Public Transport Integrated Ticketing System and Clearing House Management Act, 2024" to make Rapid Pass a payment card for all types of monetary activities. In 2024, Japan International Cooperation Agency ended their technological assistance to the Rapid Pass project. From 20 December 2024, metro stations started to sell Rapid Pass. In 2025, DTCA took an intuitive to give online recharge service and for that they called for primary tenders.

== Card usage ==
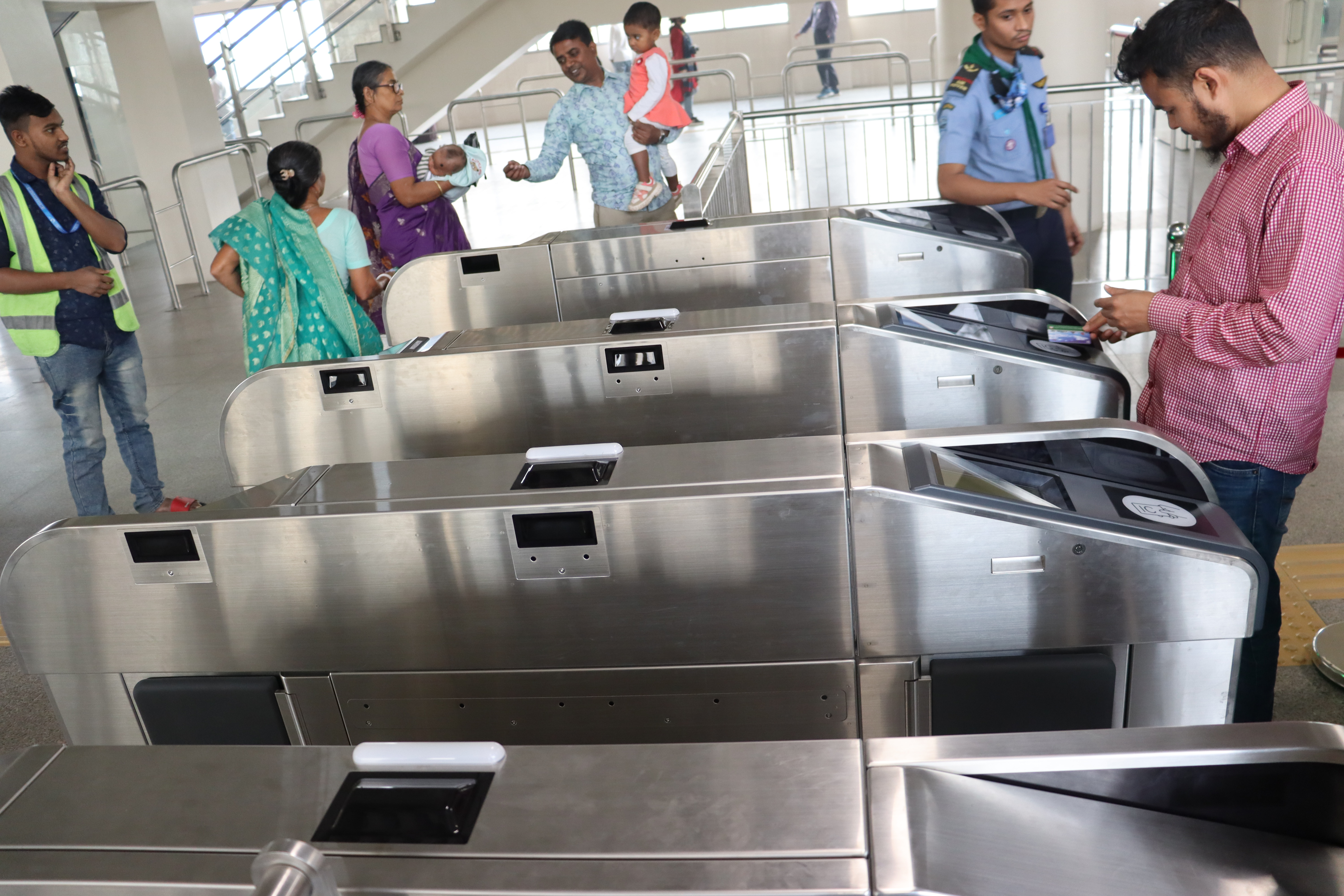
Along with MRT Pass, Rapid Pass can be used in Dhaka Metro stations for the same purpose

This card can be used to purchase tickets for BRTC bus services, BIWTA launches, Bangladesh Railway train services, MRT and BRT. Passengers will get a 10% discount on the fare for using the Rapid Pass or MRT Pass in Dhaka Metro Rail. As of July 2023, the number of Rapid Pass users was 66,180.

The Dhaka Transport Coordination Authority (DTCA) has planned to introduce Rapid Pass on Hatirjheel circular buses by 20 July 2025. The trial phase of this initiative began on 14 July 2025. In addition, there are plans to launch Rapid Pass in the Dhaka Chaka bus service operating between Gulshan and Police Plaza in August.

== Purchase and reload ==
For the card, one has to register and purchase the card from any of thirty four branches and sub branches of Dutch-Bangla Bank. The branches are including Motijheel Local Office Branch, Motijheel Foreign Exchange Branch, Elephant Road Branch, Uttara Branch, Banani Branch, Gulshan Circle-1 Branch, Gulshan Branch and Sonargaon Janpath Branch. These branches also act as recharge point. Besides, cards can be purchased and recharged at 10 bus counters located at House Building, Uttara, Banani, Shahbag, Motijheel, Rampura, Notun Bazaar, Gulshan-2, Shooting Club, Dhaka Chaka Banani Stopage and Police Plaza. The price of Rapid Pass is 400 BDT (200 BDT pre-recharged on the card). The card can be also recharge from the Dhaka Metro Rail ticket machines.

== Criticisms ==
Even after the launch of Rapid Pass, it was not made available for all bus services. On the other hand, bus operators are unwilling to use it to collect fares as they cannot collect more than the government fixed fare. On 7 December 2023, the Rapid Pass authority directed D-Money, another smart card-based automatic fare collection system permitted by Bangladesh Bank, to stop operations on the ground that any card other than Rapid Pass is invalid in the country, even though there is no such law.
