= Dhaka Transport Coordination Authority =

Government agency in Bangladesh

- ঢাকা পরিবহন সমন্বয় কর্তৃপক্ষ

Agency overview
- Formed: 2 September 2012; 13 years ago
- Jurisdiction: Greater Dhaka
- Headquarters: DTCA Building, Love Road, Tejgaon, Dhaka
- Annual budget: Allocated by Government
- Agency executive: Shabiha Pervin, Executive Director
- Parent agency: Ministry of Road Transport and Bridges
- Website: www.dtca.gov.bd

Dhaka Transport Coordination Authority (DTCA) is the government agency responsible for coordinating transport-related projects in Dhaka, the capital of Bangladesh and most of Dhaka Division. The agency is responsible for moderating and mediating negotiations between transport labor unions and transport owners. Under the Revised Strategic Transport Plan, any changes to transport infrastructure will need approval from the Dhaka Transport Coordination Authority. It is also responsible for overseeing mass transport projects in Dhaka.

== Background ==
Dhaka Transport Coordination Authority was established on 2 September 2012. It traces its origins to Dhaka Transport Coordination Board which was established in 1998. The authority was formed through the Dhaka Transport Coordination Authority Act, 2012. The authority has jurisdiction in Dhaka, Gazipur, Manikganj, Munshiganj, Narayanganj, Narsingdi and the city corporations within those districts.

== Revised Strategic Transport Plan ==
The Revised Strategic Transport Plan (RSTP), approved by the government on 29 August 2016, is a comprehensive initiative aimed at alleviating traffic congestion in the city. It encompasses the construction of various large-scale infrastructure projects, including five metro rails (MRT), two bus rapid transits (BRT), three ring roads, eight radial roads, six expressways, and 21 transportation hubs. This 20-year master plan (2015 to 2035) is structured into three phases, focusing on enhancing connectivity between Dhaka and its surrounding districts.

The first phase includes the completion of MRT, BRT Line 3, and Dhaka Elevated Expressway. The second phase involves constructing MRT Line 1 and Line 5, establishing a multimodal hub at the new airport terminal, and improving radial and ring roads and expressways.

In the third phase, the focus shifts to constructing BRT Line 7 and MRT Line 2 and Line 4, alongside further enhancements to radial and ring roads and expressways. Additionally, the plan aims to enhance circular waterways around Dhaka and improve traffic management and road safety.

The criticisms regarding the implementation of the RSTP in Dhaka include concerns about past failures in implementing similar projects, skepticism about the proper execution of the RSTP, doubts about the supporting infrastructure being developed alongside the plan, and questions about the capability of DTCA to oversee such a large-scale project effectively. Experts have pointed out that previous initiatives like the Dhaka Urban Transport Project (DUTP) and Strategic Transport Plan (STP) focused more on aspects that would gain political favor rather than addressing the integrated aspects of the plan. There are worries that without proper supporting infrastructure, such as for the construction of flyovers and metro rails, the traffic congestion issues in Dhaka will persist. Additionally, there have been instances where projects not aligned with the RSTP have been approved by the agency, raising concerns about adherence to the master plan.

== Rapid Pass ==
In 2017, the agency launched the Rapid Pass, a multipurpose stored-value card payment system. Initially launched for BRTC bus services operating on the Uttara–Motijheel route, the microchip card payment system is set to broaden its reach to encompass various modes of public transport, including private buses, trains, and ferries. Moreover, it aims to evolve its capabilities to serve additional functionalities such as shopping, payment of utility bills and student tuition fees.

== Bus route rationalisation ==
Following the 2018 Bangladesh road-safety protests, Prime Minister Sheikh Hasina directed the Dhaka South City Corporation and Local Government and Rural Development Ministry (LGRD) to consolidate Dhaka's bus services under a few companies and routes, instead of the present hundreds of routes served by hundreds of private companies. The plan was envisioned by late Annisul Huq, former mayor of Dhaka North City Corporation.

On 9 September 2018, the Local Government Division established a 10-member coordination committee, managed by the DTCA, with the aim of rationalising bus routes and consolidating all public buses under a fixed number of companies, to instil discipline in the capital's public transport system. Subsequently, the Dhaka Nagar Paribahan franchise, comprising Bangladesh Road Transport Corporation (BRTC) and Trans Silva, commenced operations with their fleet of 50 existing buses on 26 December 2021 with a trial run on a 21-kilometre (13 mi) route between Ghatarchar and Kanchpur via Motijheel and Signboard.

During the pilot phase, the service faced criticism on multiple fronts. Bus operators cited difficulties in attracting passengers due to competition from other buses, leading to financial losses. Drivers expressed dissatisfaction over incomplete salary payments, highlighting potential financial mismanagement. Commuters also complained about inadequate bus numbers, resulting in long waiting times and passenger frustration due to insufficient service capacity.

By 2024, the Dhaka Nagar Paribahan franchise faced significant challenges due to allegations of mismanagement by the committee. The service had reportedly lost discipline, operating buses on a daily contract basis with drivers, who often deviated from designated procedures by picking up passengers through flagging instead of only stopping at designated ticket counters. Moreover, private companies have withdrawn from the franchise due to financial losses, leaving only BRTC and its diminishing fleet of buses. Additionally, one route has been closed, exacerbating the strain on the already struggling service.

On 11 November 2024, the committee under the recently formed interim government revived its plan to consolidate city bus routes under a unified company structure.
