= Southern Route =

Southern Route may refer to:

- North–South Expressway Southern Route, a highway in Malaysia
- Southern, a subservice of Govia Thameslink Railway in the United Kingdom
- Southern Route, part of MRT Line 5 of Dhaka Metro Rail
