= ABM Amin Ullah Nuri =

Bangladeshi civil servant

- এ বি এম আমিন উল্লাহ নুরী

Road Transport and Highways Division

Senior Secretary
- In office 4 June 2022 – 14 August 2024
- Minister: Obaidul Quader
- Preceded by: Md. Nazrul Islam
- Succeeded by: Md. Ehsanul Haque

Personal details
- Born: 1 January 1965 (age 61) Juldha, Chittagong District, East Pakistan, Pakistan
- Education: University of Dhaka
- Occupation: Government employee

ABM Amin Ullah Nuri is a Bangladeshi civil servant and former secretary of the Road Transport and Highways Division. He is a former chairman of Rajdhani Unnayan Kartripakkha.

Nuri is the former chief executive officer of the Dhaka South City Corporation.

== Early life ==
Amin Ullah Nuri was born to Mohammad Abdun Noor and Maryam Begum on 1 January 1965 in Juldha village of Karnaphuli Upazila of Chittagong. He obtained a B.S. (Hons.) in 1987 and an M.S. in 1988 from the Department of political science, University of Dhaka.

== Career ==
In 2020, after Sheikh Fazle Noor Taposh became mayor of Dhaka South City Corporation, he appointed Nuri chief executive officer of the corporation.

Nuri was appointed chairman of Rajdhani Unnayan Kartripakkha in April 2021, replacing acting chairman Sayeed Hasan Sikder, who held the post after the retirement of Mohammad Sayeed Noor Alam.

Nuri promised to remove brokers from the Bangladesh Road Transport Authority and focus on digitalizing services. He oversaw the introduction of a new curriculum of commercial drivers education that sought to reduce sexual harassment.

In May 2021, Nuri met with a delegation from the Bangladesh Garment Manufacturers and Exporters Association (BGMEA) who requested Rajdhani Unnayan Kartripakkha repair and improve roads connecting sector-12 of Uttara to BGMEA headquarters. On 20 December 2021, he was promoted to secretary.

Nuri blamed the contractor for the collapse of a girder of an under-construction elevated expressway of the Bus Rapid Transit project that resulted in fatalities. He worked with Obaidul Quader, Minister of Road Transport and Bridges, to award a contract for 137 buses for Dhaka Bus Rapid Transit to their preferred contractor. He and Monjur Hossain, secretary of the Bridges Division, blamed pedestrians and commuters for increasing road fatalities in Bangladesh. He oversaw the opening of the first metro rail of Bangladesh, Dhaka Metro Rail.

Nuri was reappointed secretary of the Road Transport and Highways Division on a contract on 26 June 2024. He was given a contractual appointment along with Md Tofazzel Hossain Miah, principal secretary of Prime Minister Sheikh Hasina. His contractual appointment was cancelled after the resignation of Prime Minister Sheikh Hasina, along with 10 other secretaries. The ten others are K. M. Abdus Salam, Khairul Islam, Lokman Hossain Miah, Md. Mokammel Hossain, Md. Humayun Kabir, Md. Ali Hossain, Satyajit Karmaker, and Wahida Akter.
