= Southern Route (MRT Line 5) =

Branch of a mass rapid transit line of Dhaka Metro

Mass Rapid Transit Line 5 Southern Route

Overview
- Status: Under construction
- Owner: Road Transport and Highways Division
- Locale: Greater Dhaka, Bangladesh
- Termini: Gabtoli (West); Dasherkandi (East)
- Stations: 15
- Colour on map: Orange (#FF8200)

Service
- Type: Rapid transit
- System: Dhaka Metro Rail
- Operator: Dhaka Mass Transit Company Limited
- Depot(s): Dasherkandi, Badda Thana

History
- Completed: August 2033 (planned for full project)

Technical
- Line length: 17.3 kilometres (10.7 mi)
- Number of tracks: 2
- Character: Elevated and underground
- Track gauge: 1,435 mm (4 ft 8 1/2 in) standard gauge
Route map

The Southern Route (Bengali: সাউদার্ন রুট) is one of the branches of the approved MRT Line 5 line of Dhaka Metro Rail; the other one being the Northern Route. The project was approved on 16 September 2026.

== History ==
In 2005, the World Bank published a study report, recommending that the government of Bangladesh build a mass transit system in Dhaka. In the same year, American consultancy firm Louis Berger Group prepared a strategic transport plan for Dhaka. The World Bank helped to develop this plan, which proposed the construction of five MRT lines in Dhaka. The five metro lines were MRT Line 1, MRT Line 2, MRT Line 4, MRT Line 5 and MRT Line 6. On 11 December 2019, Dhaka Mass Transit Company Limited (DMTCL) signed a loan agreement with the Asian Development Bank (ADB) for pre-construction work of US$33.26 million, which was 74.60% of the required amount. On 29 March 2021, EGIS Rail SA, Egis India Consulting Engineers Pvt Ltd, Oriental Consultants Global Company Ltd and SMEC International Pvt. Ltd signed a memorandum of understanding with DMTCL for the consultancy of the route. As per the agreement, the companies jointly undertook feasibility study, detailed design and procurement for the route.

The route of the Southern Route was initially fixed from Gabtoli to Trimohani Bridge area. The location of two underground stations on this route was decided at College Gate and Asad Gate which are located near Ganabhaban. DMTCL planned to conduct a survey to determine the location of the two stations. It was necessary to obtain permission from the Prime Minister's Office to carry out a survey near the important building. As of 2022, A coordination meeting was to be held to resolve the complications in determining the alignment of the route. The total budget of the Southern Route construction project was estimated at US$4.7 billion, of which ADB is expected to contribute 53.19%. But in a stakeholder meeting on 26 February 2023, the government requested ADB to pay 6.38% more. In May 2023, South Korea signed a framework arrangement to provide $1.5 billion in financing for the route. Under the project, there are plans to build two transit oriented hubs at Gabtoli and Dasherkandi. In November 2023, South Korea confirmed $1 billion fund for the line. In the same month, the Asian Development Bank secured $3 billion in funding for the Southern Route. In March 2024, the Ministry of Road Transport and Bridges submitted the proposal for the construction of the Southern Route to the Project Evaluation Committee. In the meeting of Bangladesh Planning Commission in April 2024, it was decided to reduce its proposed budget to a rational amount.

Later, after the formation of Yunus interim government in August 2024, some proposals were presented to the government under the direction of Planning Adviser Wahiduddin Mahmud. The proposals are to scrap the project and implement MRT Line 2, scrap the first eight stations of the route and build the Hatirjheel to Dasherkandi section, and not implement the project until the country's economic situation improves. Later, due to criticism, its budget was reduced and as of January 2025, the authorities were thinking of sending its development project proposal to the Bangladesh Planning Commission. On 17 February 2025, the Planning Commission approved the construction project for the route, with a final budget of ৳477.21 billion (including grants worth of ৳323.32 billion from the ADB and the South Korean government) and its target completion in 2031 (later extended to August 2033). In September 2025, plans for the Southern Route were suspended pending further review.

The project was approved on 16 September 2026 by the Executive Committee of the National Economic Council (ECNEC) under the Tarique Rahman ministry with a cost of Tk 455 billion. It is the first Dhaka Metro Rail line that is not being funded by Japan.

== Stations ==
The MRT Line 5's Southern Route has 15 proposed stations. 4 stations will be elevated and 11 stations will be underground.

Code	Name		Connections	Location	Opened
Code	English	Bengali	Connections	Location	Opened
1	Gabtoli	গাবতলী	MRT Line 2 MRT Line 5N	Mirpur Model Thana	Planned
2	Technical	টেকনিক্যাল		Darus Salam Thana	Planned
3	Kallyanpur	কল্যাণপুর		Kallyanpur	Planned
4	Shyamoli	শ্যামলী		Shyamoli	Planned
5	College Gate	কলেজ গেট		Sher-e-Bangla Nagar Thana	Planned
6	Asad Gate	আসাদ গেট		Mohammadpur Thana	Planned
7	Shukrabad	শুকরাবাদ		Dhanmondi	Planned
8	Karwan Bazar	কারওয়ান বাজার	MRT Line 6	Karwan Bazar	Planned
9	Hatirjheel	হাতিরঝিল		Hatirjheel Thana	Planned
10	Tejgaon	তেজগাঁও		Tejgaon Industrial Area Thana	Planned
11	Aftabnagar	আফতাবনগর	MRT Line 1	Aftabnagar	Planned
12	Aftabnagar Center	আফতাবনগর সেন্টার		Aftabnagar	Planned
13	Aftabnagar East	আফতাবনগর পশ্চিম		Aftabnagar	Planned
14	Nasirabad	নাসিরাবাদ		Badda Thana	Planned
15	Dasherkandi	দাশেরকান্দি		Badda Thana	Planned
