= Chetona '71 =

Sculpture in Bangladesh

- চেতনা '৭১ (Bengali)
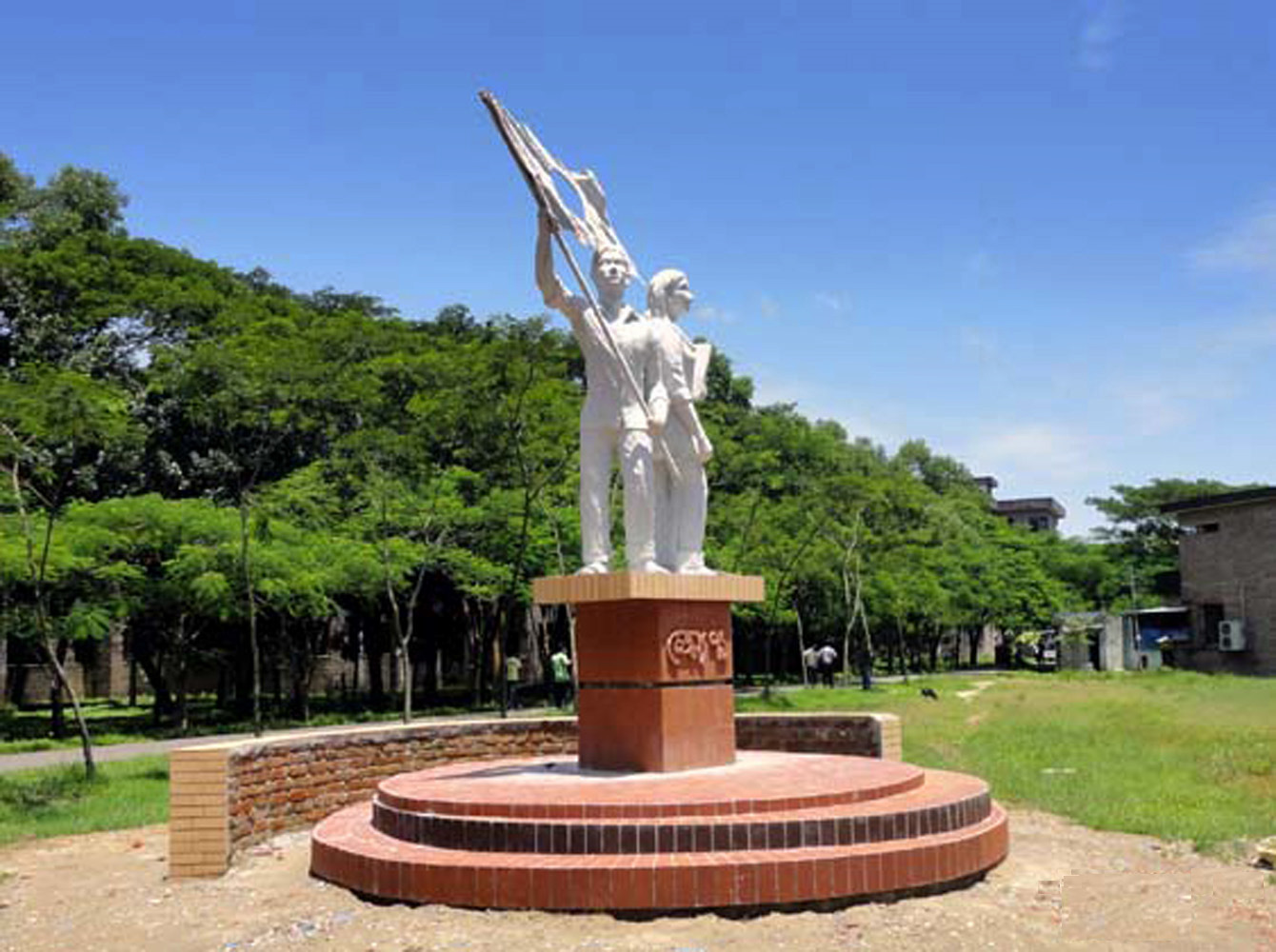
- Artist: Mubarak Hossain Nripal
- Year: 26 March 2009 (Temporary); 30 July 2011 (Permanent)
- Subject: Bangladesh Liberation War
- Location: Sylhet
- Owner: Shahjalal University of Science and Technology

Chetona '71 (Bengali: চেতনা '৭১; English: Consciousness '71) is a sculpture commemorating the Bangladesh Liberation War, located at Shahjalal University of Science and Technology (SUST). It is the first Liberation War monument in the Greater Sylhet region.

== History ==
Students of the 2005–06 academic year erected a temporary sculpture called Chetona '71 on 26 March 2009, west of the mini‑auditorium. A Sculpture Reinstallation Committee, composed of students from multiple batches, was formed to oversee the replacement of the temporary work with a permanent monument. The process to construct a permanent sculpture subsequently began, resulting in the present Chetona '71.

== Location ==
The sculpture was constructed on the north-western site of Building A in the University at a cost of approximately 680,000 Taka. In addition to the initiative taken by the students of the 2005–06 session, the alumni of the first batch also contributed to the funding. Furthermore, Dutch-Bangla Bank provided financial support. The sculpture was inaugurated on 30 July 2011, by the Vice-Chancellor of SUST, Professor Saleh Uddin.

== Dimensions ==
To harmonize with the red‑brick academic buildings and enhance the monument's appearance, the pedestal consists of three circular steps made of red and black ceramic bricks. The lower step has a diameter of 15 feet, the middle step 13.5 feet, and the upper step 12 feet; each step is 10 inches high. Above these three steps stands the main pedestal, which is 6 feet high, and on top of it rises the principal figure, measuring 12 feet in height. The sculpture has been designed and created by artist Mubarak Hossain Nripal of Nree School of Sculpture in Narayanganj.

== Architectural significance ==
The sculpture features a male student raising the national flag of Bangladesh and a female student holding a symbolic book representing the Constitution. From a distance, the monument appears to stand like a vigilant guardian under the open sky, symbolising the protection of the nation's freedom and sovereignty.

== Gallery ==
=== Current ===
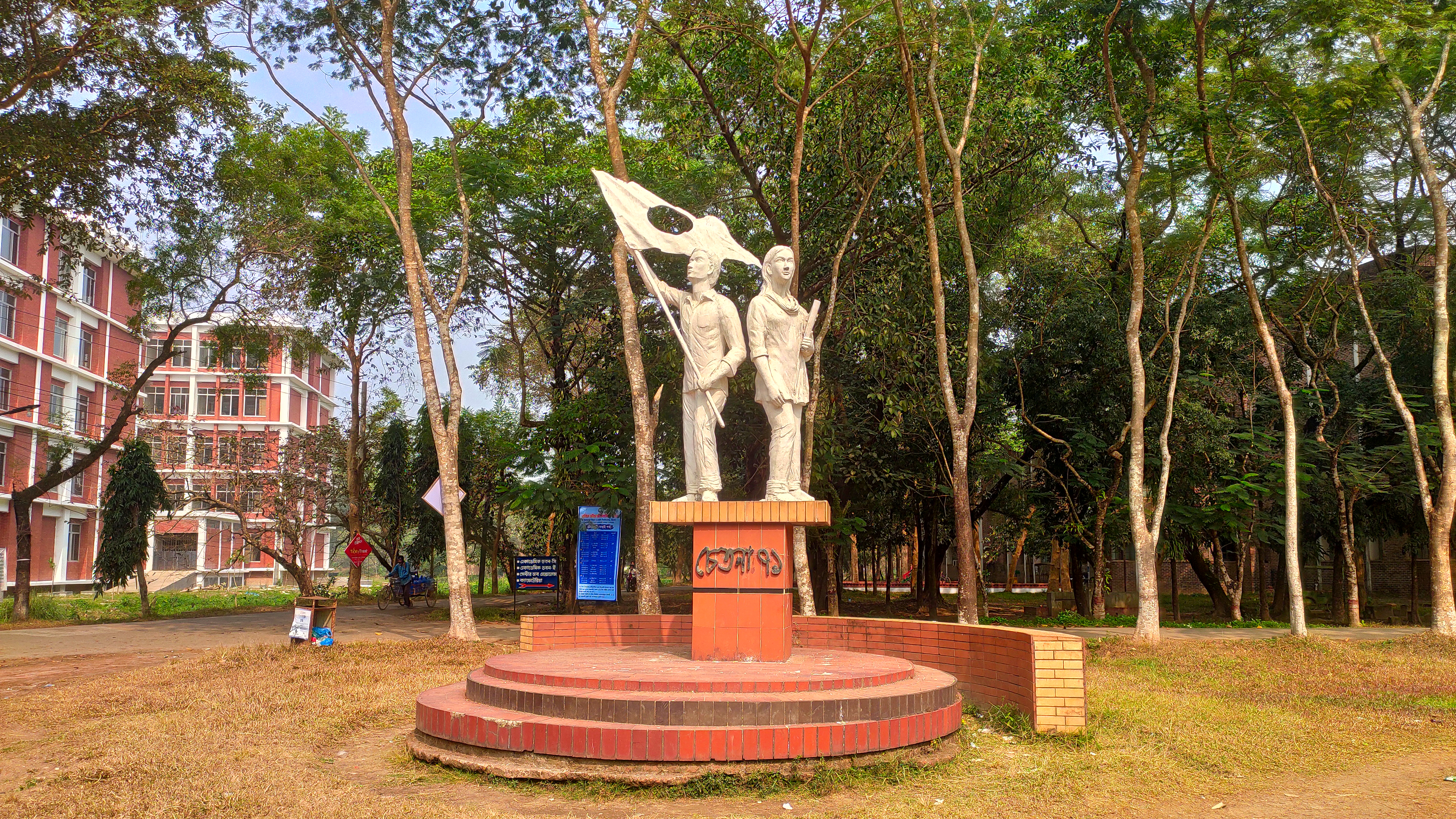

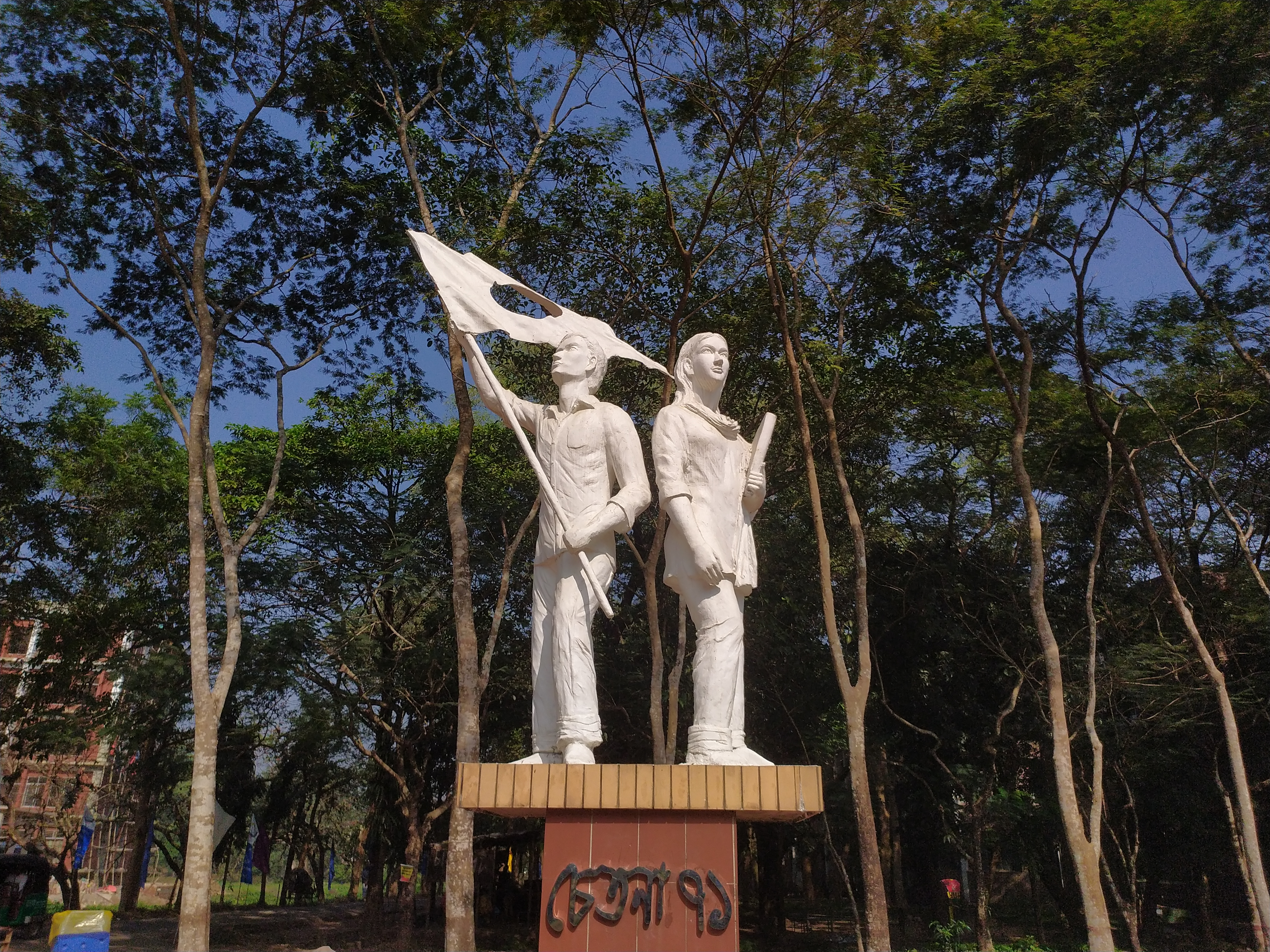

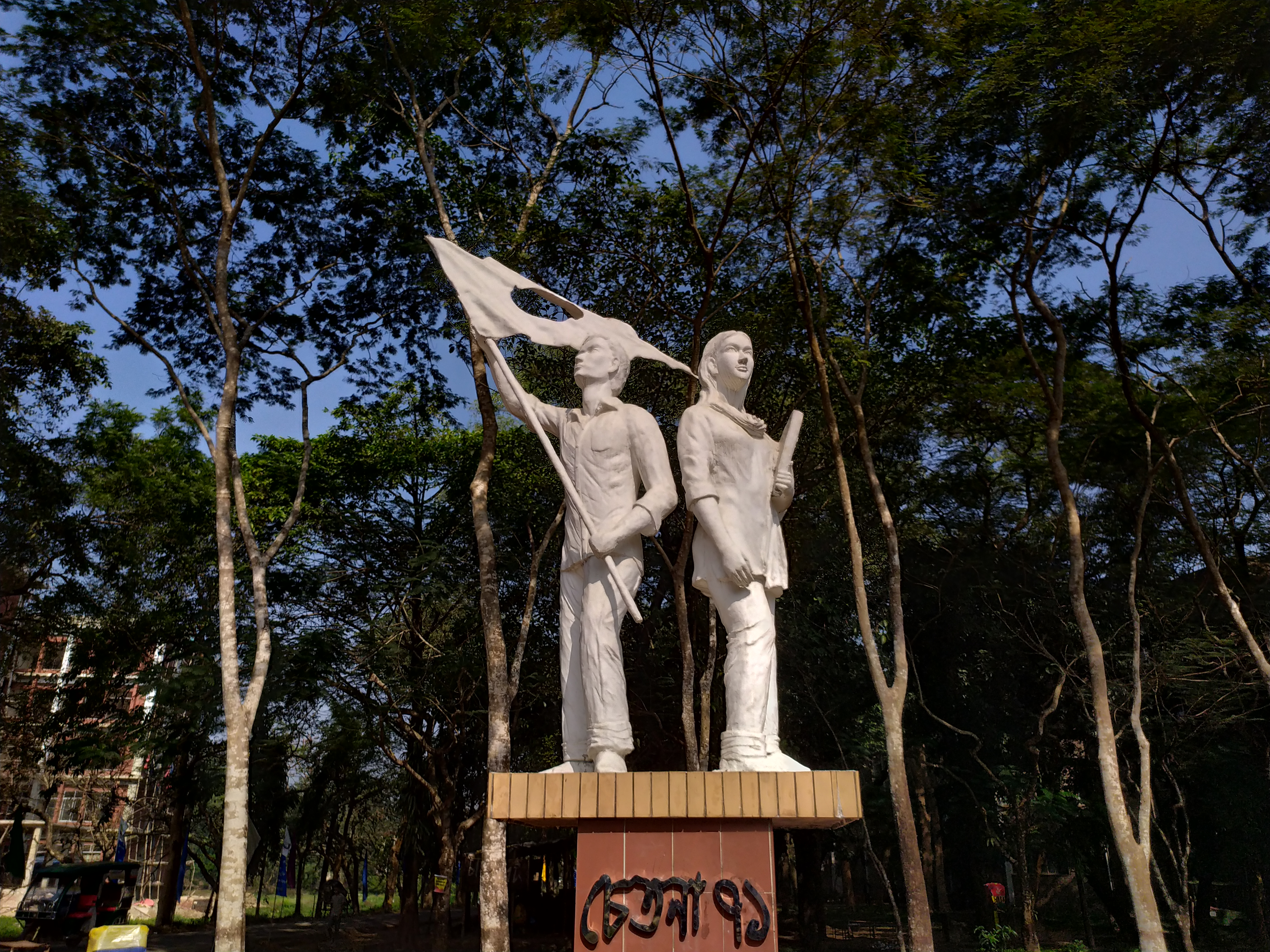

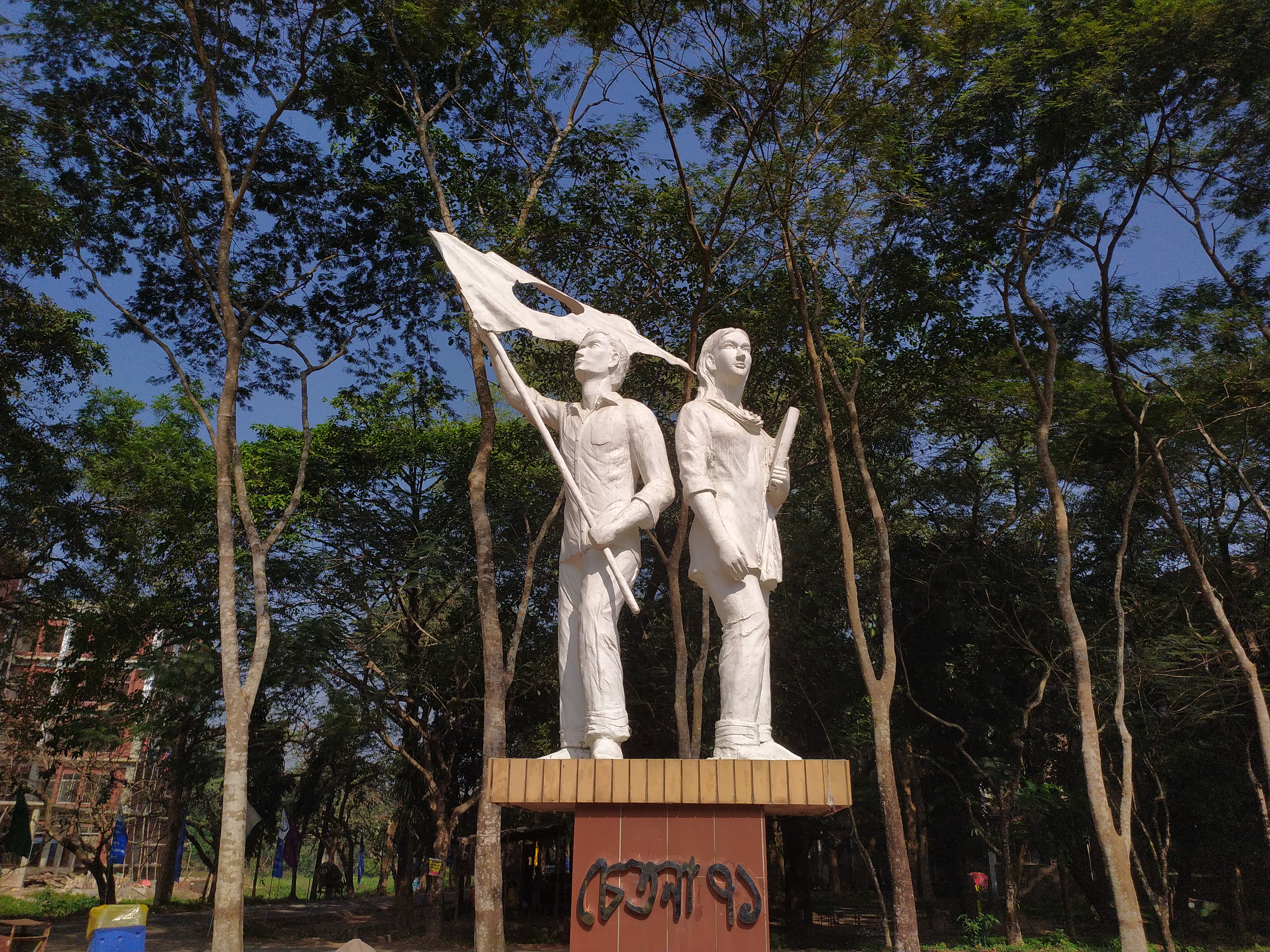

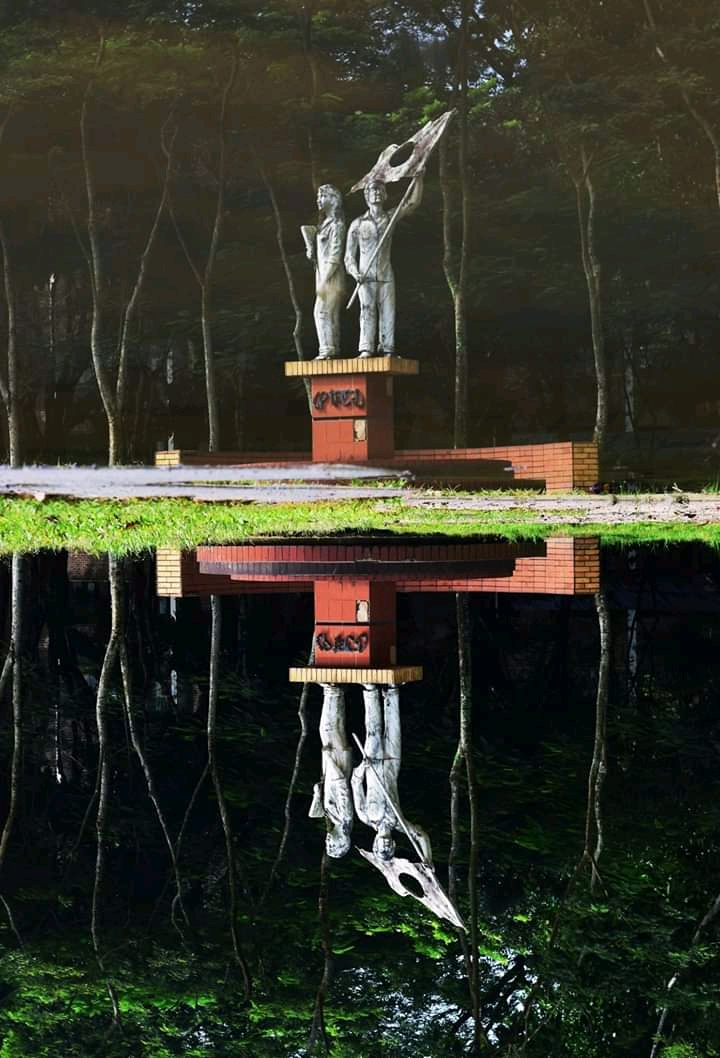

=== Initial ===
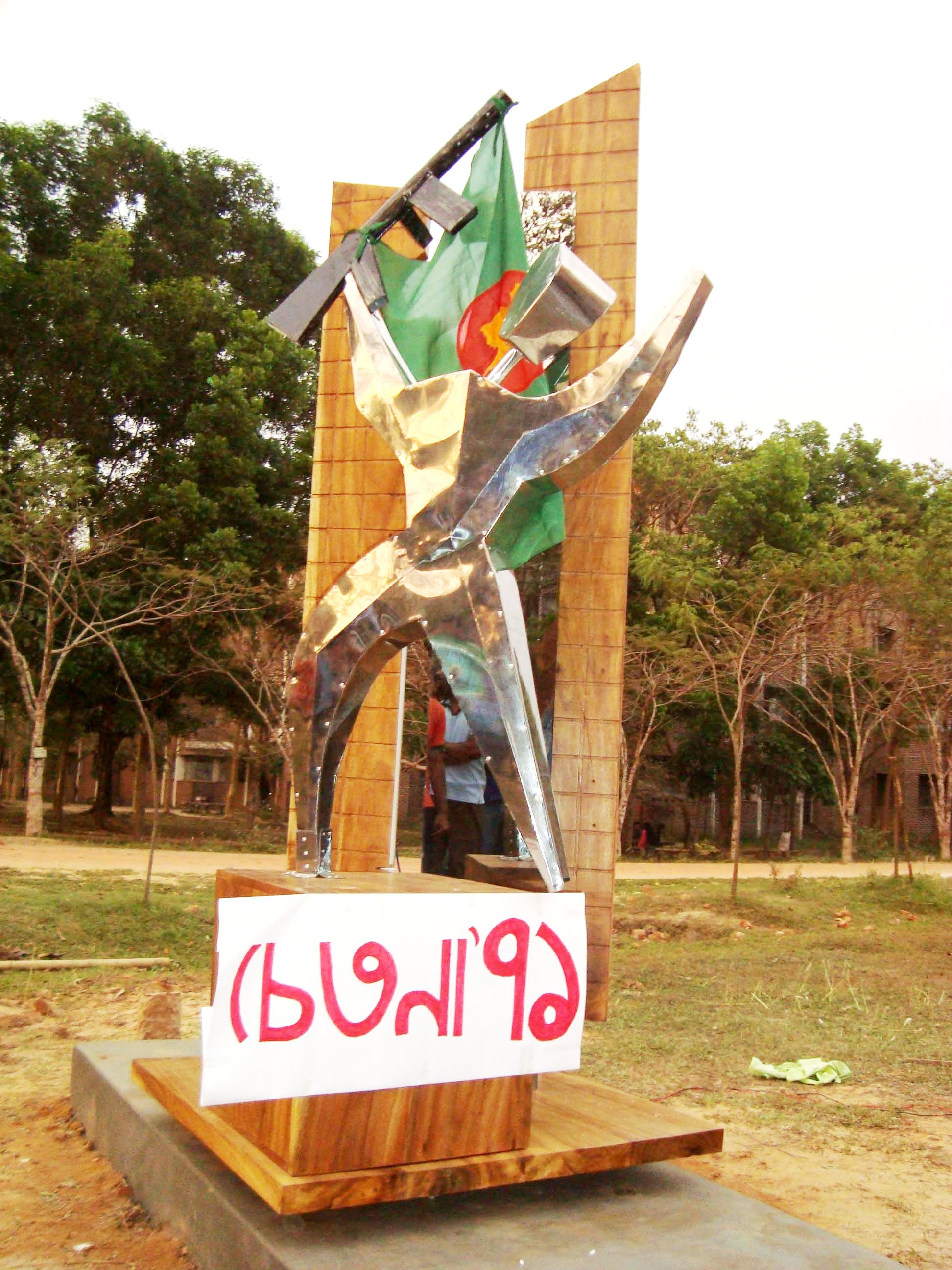

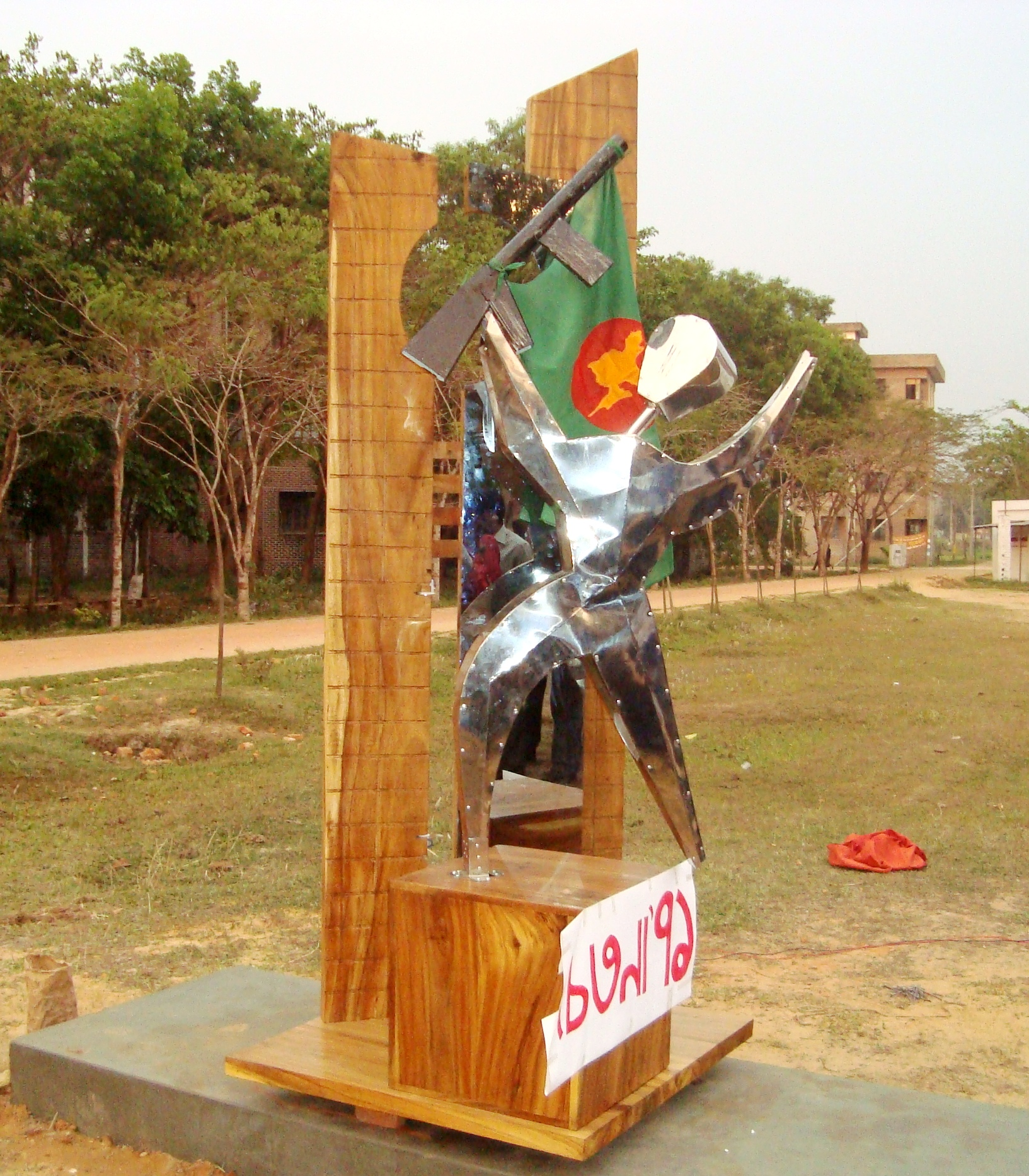

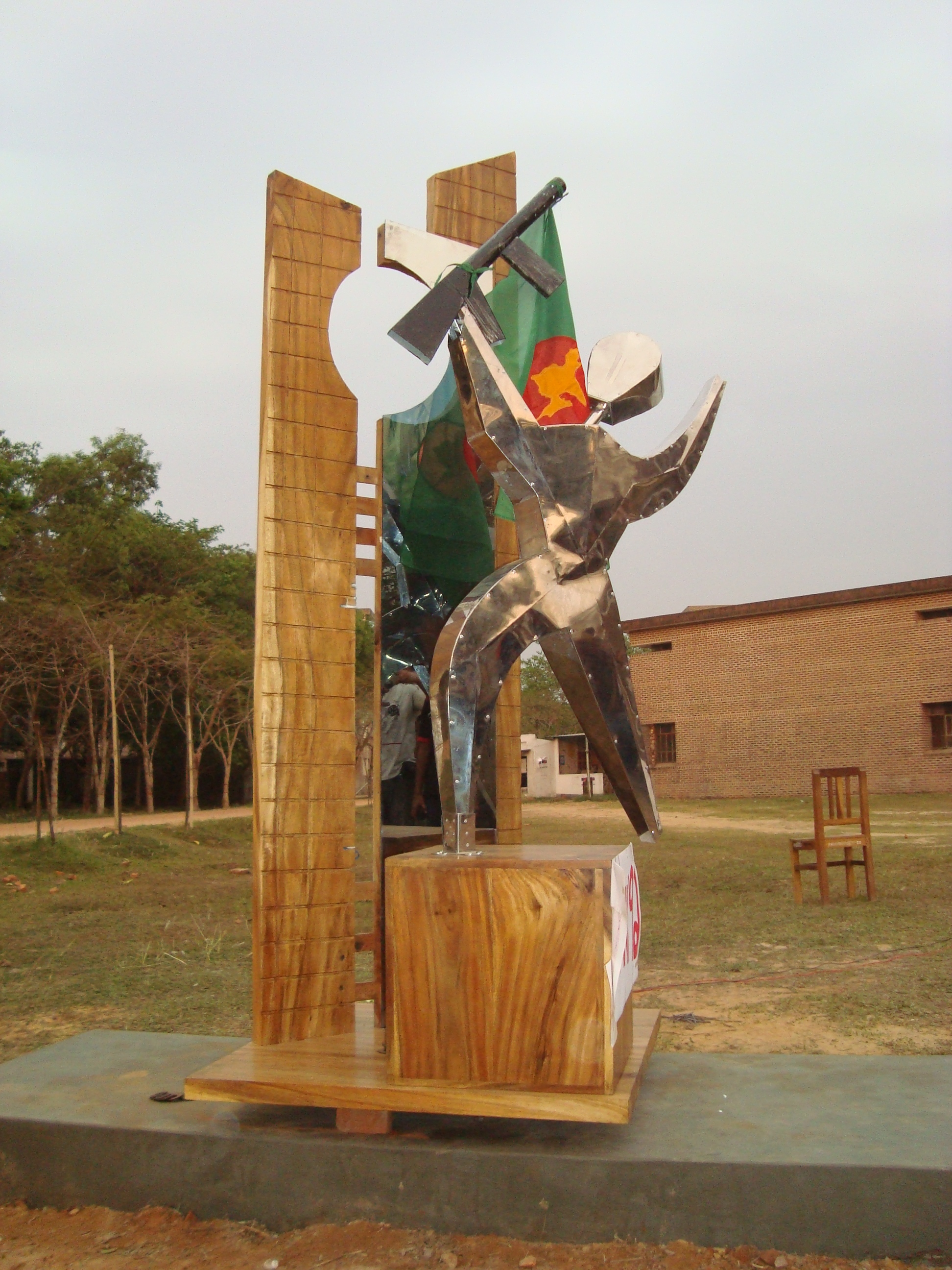
