= MRT Pass =

Smart card fare system in Bangladesh

- Native name: এম আর টি পাস
- Location: Dhaka, Bangladesh
- Launched: 29 December 2022
- Technology: Contactless smart card
- Operator: Dhaka Mass Transit Company Limited
- Currency: BDT (৳100 minimum load, ৳10000 maximum load)
- Stored-value: e-purse
- Credit expiry: 10 years
- Auto recharge: No
- Validity: Dhaka MRT
- Retailed: Stations of Dhaka Metro Rail

The MRT Pass is a smart card automated fare collection system based on near-field communication (NFC) technology used on participating public transit systems in Dhaka, the capital of Bangladesh.

== Card usage ==
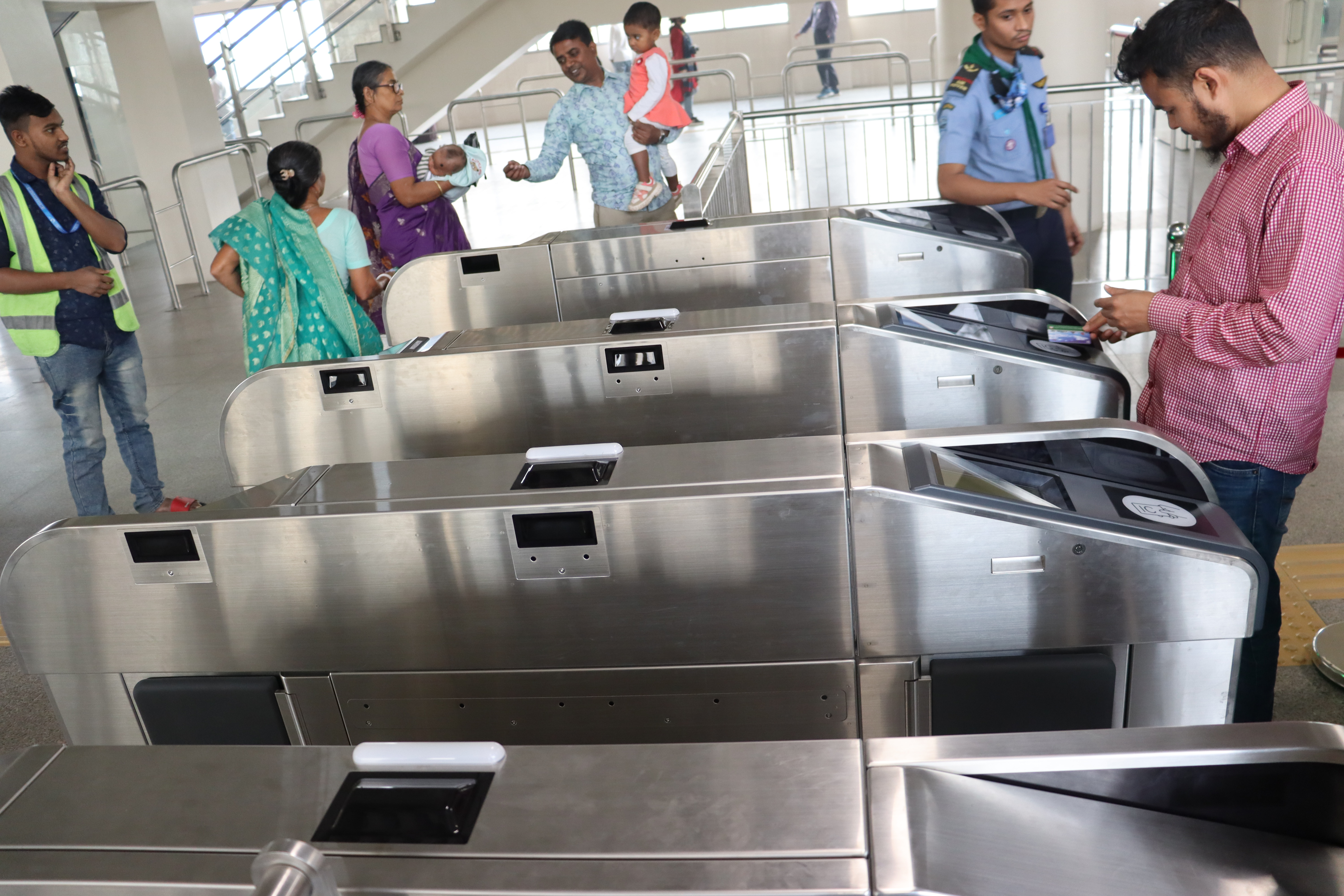
A passenger is using MRT Pass at a Dhaka Metro Rail station

This card is currently used in Dhaka Metro Rail. Passengers will get a 10% discount on the fare for using the MRT Pass or Rapid Pass.

== Purchase and recharge ==
For the card, one has to register and purchase the card (Through filling up this form. It can be collected from the excess fair or customer service office in any Dhaka metro rail station.) from the excess fare office or customer service centre at any station of Dhaka Metro Rail and reload from the ticket machines. The price of MRT Pass is 500 taka (300 taka pre-recharged on the card). Currently It has no official user app.
