= MRT Line 4 (Dhaka Metro Rail) =

Approved mass rapid transit line of Dhaka Metro Rail

Mass Rapid Transit Line 4

Overview
- Native name: ম্যাস র‍্যাপিড ট্রানজিট লাইন ৪
- Status: Proposed
- Owner: Road Transport and Highways Division
- Locale: Greater Dhaka, Bangladesh
- Termini: Kamalapur (West); Madanpur (East)
- Stations: 8
- Colour on map: Dark Blue (#003DA5)

Service
- Type: Rapid transit
- System: Dhaka Metro Rail
- Operator: Dhaka Mass Transit Company Limited
- Depot(s): Madanpur, Bandar Upazila

History
- Planned opening: December 2030

Technical
- Line length: 16 kilometres (9.9 mi)
- Number of tracks: 2
- Character: Elevated and underground
- Track gauge: 1,435 mm (4 ft 8 1/2 in) standard gauge
- Electrification: 750 V DC third rail and 1,500 V DC overhead catenary
- Operating speed: 100 km/h (62 mph)
- Highest elevation: 13 metres (43 ft)
Route map

The MRT Line 4 (Bengali: এমআরটি লাইন ৪) of Dhaka Metro Rail is a proposed mass rapid transit line, stretching from Dhaka city's main railway station to Madanpur. This line is scheduled to be completed by 2030 and will be operated by the Dhaka Mass Transit Company Limited (DMTCL). South Korea has expressed interest to invest in this project.

== History ==
In 2005, the World Bank published a study report, recommending that the government of Bangladesh build a mass transit system in Dhaka. In the same year, American consultancy firm Louis Berger Group prepared a strategic transport plan for Dhaka. The World Bank helped to develop this plan, which proposed the construction of five MRT lines in Dhaka. The five metro lines were MRT Line 1, MRT Line 2, MRT Line 4, MRT Line 5 and MRT Line 6. In 2017, an agreement was signed between the government of Bangladesh and Japan to build MRT Line 4 on a Public Private Partnership (PPP) basis. On 1 October 2019, Selina Hayat Ivy, the mayor of Narayanganj City Corporation submitted a written request to Obaidul Quader, the Road Transport and Bridges minister, to connect Narayanganj with the Dhaka Metro network. Although, there was an existing plan to connect the city with Kamalapur by building MRT Line 4 which was proposed to be an underground line parallel with the Narayanganj–Bahadurabad Ghat line. But due to the ongoing double line construction project to increase the commuter service on the line and the construction of the Dhaka–Jessore line, if MRT Line 4 is constructed there, there will not be enough passengers to make the metro line profitable, Dhaka Mass Transit Company Limited (DMTCL) has revised the alignment and changed the destination of the route to Madanpur. In 2023, the government pulled out of the deal with Japan to build MRT Line 4 due to higher costs. the government decided to request the Department of Economic Relations (ERD) to find donors to fund MRT Line 4. ERD found World Bank, Japan and South Korea as potential donors.

== Stations ==
The MRT Line 4 is still in the planning stages. There may be changes to the list of stations, including adding new stations, assigning different names to the stations or some stations getting eliminated from the line. Hence, the following list of stations is tentative and may be updated in the future.

Code	Name		Connections	Location	Opened
Code	English	Bengali	Connections	Location	Opened
1	Kamalapur	কমলাপুর	Bus station Bangladesh Railway MRT Line 1 MRT Line 2 MRT Line 6	Motijheel Thana	2030
2	Sayedabad	সায়েদাবাদ		Jatrabari Thana	2030
3	Jatrabari	যাত্রাবাড়ী		Jatrabari Thana	2030
4	Shonir Akhra	শনির আখড়া		Jatrabari Thana	2030
5	Signboard	সাইনবোর্ড	MRT Line 2	Siddhirganj Thana	2030
6	Chittagong Road	চট্টগ্রাম রোড		Siddhirganj Thana	2030
7	Kanchpur	কাঁচপুর		Sonargaon Upazila	2030
8	Madanpur	মদনপুর		Madanpur	2030
