= Dhaka BRT =

Bus rapid transit system in Dhaka

Dhaka Bus Rapid Transit
- Logo of Dhaka BRT

Overview
- Native name: ঢাকা বিআরটি
- Owner: Road Transport and Highways Division
- Locale: Dhaka
- Transit type: Bus rapid transit
- Number of lines: BRT line 3: Shelved, BRT line 7: Proposed
- Number of stations: BRT line 3 northern section: 25 (shelved); BRT line 3 southern section: 16 (planned)
- Daily ridership: 400,000 (estimated)
- Headquarters: House 4, Road 21, Sector 4, Uttara, Dhaka
- Website: dhakabrt.gov.bd

Operation
- Began operation: BRT line 3 northern section: 15 December 2024 (without full facilities)
- Operator: Dhaka Bus Rapid Transit Company Limited
- Number of vehicles: Current: 10 diesel-run BRTC AC buses; Planned: 137 diesel-run purpose built AC buses

Technical
- System length: 41 km (25 mi)
- Average speed: 23 km/h

The Dhaka BRT (Bengali: ঢাকা বিআরটি) or Dhaka Line (Bengali: ঢাকা লাইন) was an under-construction bus rapid transit system in Dhaka, Bangladesh.

The original plan for the network included two lines: BRT Line-3 and BRT Line-7. BRT Line-3 was shelved in 2025 due to expected traffic chaos as it neared completion, while the other route is still in the planning phase. The Bangladesh Road Transport Corporation operates a bus route on the incomplete BRT Line-3.

== History ==
=== Planning ===
In 2005, the World Bank published a study report, recommending that the government of Bangladesh build a transit system in Dhaka. In the same year, American consultancy firm Louis Berger Group prepared a 20-year strategic transport plan for Dhaka. The World Bank helped to develop this plan, which proposed the construction of three bus rapid transit systems in Dhaka. In 2011, a primary feasibility study was done for BRT by the Asian Development Bank. On 1 December 2012, the ECNEC approved the BRT project under the Greater Dhaka Sustainable Urban Transport Project, implemented by three agencies: the Roads and Highways Department, the Bangladesh Bridge Authority and the Local Government Engineering Department. In 2013, the state-owned Dhaka Bus Rapid Transit (BRT) Company was formed as a special purpose company under this project to plan, execute, operate, and manage a bus-based mass transit system in the capital. In 2020, the company appointed its first managing director, and following a court order, eight years' worth of annual general meetings were held in a single session in 2022.

The Revised Strategic Transport Plan approved in 2016 as the successor to the 2005 transport plan, reduced the number of bus rapid transit lines down to two. The budget of BRT Line 3 was fixed at ৳2040 crore (US$170 million), which was later increased to ৳4268 crore (US$350 million).

Initially, the Dhaka BRT Company made the decision to operate articulated buses along the BRT route; however, this was later revised in favour of electric buses. Subsequently, the authority changed course again and opted to procure 137 diesel-run AC buses instead in January 2023. As of December 2024, the bidding process for bus procurement is at the final stage, after initial tender was cancelled due to forgery allegations.

=== Construction ===
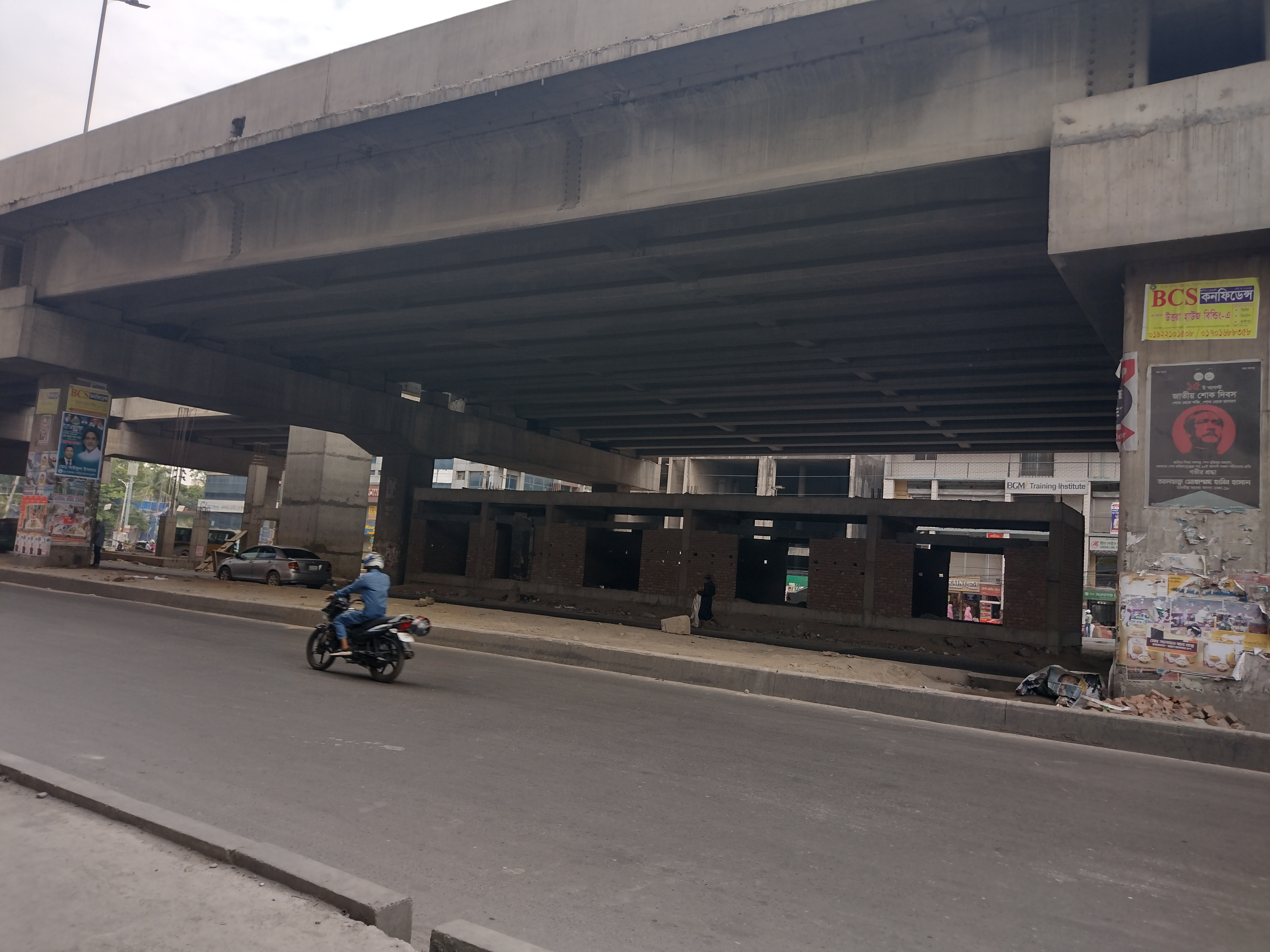
Construction of a bus rapid transit station in House Building, Uttara

BRT Line 3 was supposed to be completed by 2016, but construction could not begin due to several factors like route redefinition, the absence of a final feasibility study prior to project initiation, frequent alterations in architectural designs, and the incorporation of new establishments into the plan. As a result of these factors, the government found it necessary to extend the construction period, leading to a subsequent increase in the construction budget by 52.20%.

On 1 December 2016, the government appointed Gezhouba Group as the contractor for the construction of the northern section of BRT Line 3, which was expected to complete construction within two and a half years. In 2017, Bangladesh Bridge Authority signed an agreement with Jiangsu Provincial Transportation Engineering Group Co. Ltd for the construction of a 4.5-kilometre (2.8 mi) elevated road (flyover) and 10-lane Tongi Bridge, along with 10 elevated stations, as part of the BRT project.

In 2019, the Road Transport and Highways Division (RHD) created a detail engineering design for the southern section of BRT Line 3 (Airport to Keraniganj). The RHD is also responsible for constructing a 16-kilometre (9.9 mi) road, which includes the construction of seven flyovers.

The project deadline was revised to 30 June 2020 and June 2022 respectively, but its construction could not be completed. On 6 November 2022, Minister of Road Transport and Bridges Obaidul Quader said that the northern section of BRT Line 3 was likely to be commissioned in May or June 2023. On 17 June 2023, Quader informed that the bus rapid transit service would be launched in September or October of the same year. However, after several more extensions, the project's deadline is December 2025. As of January 2025, the construction of the northern section is 97% complete.

==== Incidents ====
On 14 March 2021, six workers, including three Chinese nationals, sustained injuries when a girder collapsed on them near Dhaka airport. Then, on 15 July 2022, a construction worker working on the BRT project died after a crane accident at Chandana Chourasta area on the Dhaka–Mymensingh highway in Gazipur.

On 15 August 2022, five people were killed when a girder used in the construction of the project fell on a private vehicle at Jasimuddin Square, Uttara. As a result, Mayor Atiqul Islam announced the suspension of BRT construction in the Dhaka North City Corporation area until the contractors obtained all types of compliance certificates. The government's investigative team held the contractors accountable for the accident. As a result, the two contractors were declared ineligible for upcoming construction projects. Construction subsequently resumed in mid-September 2022.

In January 2023, authorities dismantled a BRT ramp in the Dhaka airport area due to the use of low-quality and defective materials by the contractor. The work was restarted by engaging new subcontractors and materials were sourced from different suppliers, as stated by authorities. This incident resulted in disruptions, cost escalations, and time overruns for the project.

On 15 April 2023, three people were injured as a crane used in the construction of the BRT system fell on shops in Tongi.

During the 2024 Bangladesh quota reform movement, the project experienced another setback when 22 escalators of the BRT stations were damaged due to vandalism by miscreants.

=== Operation ===
On 6 November 2022, a segment of the Bus Rapid Transit (BRT) project, comprising the Dhaka-bound two lanes of the flyover from Tongi Fire Service in Gazipur to Uttara House Building, was opened to vehicular traffic.

On 24 March 2024, seven flyovers of the BRT project were opened to traffic with the aim of mitigating traffic congestion along the Dhaka–Gazipur route.

The state-run Bangladesh Road Transport Corporation launched a bus route utilising the shared and incomplete BRT corridor on 16 December 2024, following the authorities' failure to procure specialised buses in time for the project.

=== Termination ===
The government cancelled the project in October 2026 and directed to destroy its structures.

== Routes ==
=== BRT Line 3 ===
BRT Line 3 is composed of two sections. The northern section extends 20.5 kilometres (12.7 mi) from Shibbari in Gazipur to Hazrat Shahjalal International Airport. A total of 25 stations are currently under construction within this section, with plans for it to link up with the airport station of MRT Line 1 that goes to Kamalapur Railway Station. This route is expected to lower travel times from Gazipur to Dhaka from 1.5–4 hours down to 35–40 minutes.

The 22-kilometre (14 mi) southern section was planned to be constructed from Hazrat Shahjalal International Airport to Jhilmil Residential Area in Keraniganj which will consist of 16 stations. However, in 2020, the plan was dropped due to bad experience with the under-construction route, according to Minister of Road Transport and Bridges Obaidul Quader.

=== BRT Line 7 ===
A feasibility study conducted by the Dhaka Transport Coordination Authority (DTCA) identified a route from Narayanganj to Gazipur as a viable option for implementation for BRT Line 7. However, progress on the project has been hindered by a lack of interest from relevant authorities and land encroachments throughout the route.

== Criticisms ==
The BRT Line 3 project has encountered significant setbacks and criticism. Delays resulting from land acquisition challenges, design modifications, and financial constraints on contractors have led to cost escalations and public inconvenience during construction. Frequent changes, such as the shift from articulated to electric and then to diesel buses, have raised concerns about operational efficiency, cost-effectiveness, and deviations from the project's original purpose. Contractors who bid low have struggled to secure funding, resulting in substandard work and further delays. The estimated cost of the project has more than doubled since its inception, prompting allegations of financial mismanagement. Inconsistent planning decisions, such as altering the number of bus stations and lanes, have contributed to delays and increased costs. The lack of foresight in design elements, including inadequate drainage and the absence of footpaths in industrial areas like Gazipur, as well as the design of the Tongi Bridge, has drawn criticism. Frequent changes to technical specifications and designs have raised doubts about the project's profitability and efficiency.
