= MRT Line 1 (Dhaka Metro Rail) =

Mass rapid transit line of Dhaka Metro

Mass Rapid Transit Line 1

Overview
- Status: Under construction
- Owner: Road Transport and Highways Division
- Locale: Greater Dhaka, Bangladesh
- Termini: Dhaka Airport (North)/Purbachal Terminal (Northeast); Kamalapur (South)
- Stations: 21
- Colour on map: Red (#DA291C)

Service
- Type: Rapid transit
- System: Dhaka Metro Rail
- Operator: Dhaka Mass Transit Company Limited
- Depot(s): Pitalganj, Rupganj
- Daily ridership: 800,000 (estimated)

History
- Work began: 2 February 2023
- Planned opening: December 2033

Technical
- Line length: Airport route: 19.872 kilometres (12.348 mi); Purbachal route: 11.361 kilometres (7.059 mi); Total: 31.24 kilometres (19.41 mi)
- Num of tracks: 2
- Character: Elevated (Purbachal route); Underground (Airport route)
- Track gauge: 1,435 mm (4 ft 8 1/2 in) standard gauge
- Electrification: 750 V DC third rail (Airport route); 1,500 V DC overhead catenary (Purbachal route)
- Operating speed: 100 km/h (62 mph)
- Highest elevation: Purbachal route: 13 metres (43 ft)
Route map

The MRT Line 1 (Bengali: এমআরটি লাইন ১) is an under-construction rapid transit line of Dhaka Metro Rail in Bangladesh. It will be the second line of the Dhaka Metro Rail system and will be operated by Dhaka Mass Transit Company Limited (DMTCL). Its construction started in February 2023. It is scheduled to open in December 2033.

== History ==
In 2005, the World Bank published a study report, recommending that the government of Bangladesh build a mass transit system in Dhaka. In the same year, American consultancy firm Louis Berger Group prepared a strategic transport plan for Dhaka. The World Bank helped to develop this plan, which proposed the construction of five MRT lines in Dhaka. The five metro lines were MRT Line 1, MRT Line 2, MRT Line 4, MRT Line 5 and MRT Line 6. The budget for MRT Line 1 was set at ৳52,561.43 crore of which Japan International Cooperation Agency agreed to finance 75%. Completion of the construction of the line was initially targeted for December 2026.

In 2019, the government finalized the construction project of the line. But with the onset of the COVID-19 pandemic, progress on the line's project stalled. On 15 June 2022, the license of MRT Line 1 was handed over to DMTCL by the Road Transport and Highways Division. On 23 October 2022, the government signed an agreement with Nippon Koei Bangladesh Limited to join the company as a consultant for MRT Line 1. In the same year, the government entered into an agreement with a Joint Venture consisting of Tokyu Construction and Max Infrastructure for the land development work of the only depot of the proposed project at Pitalganj. On 28 December 2022, the day of the inauguration of MRT Line 6, the secretary of the Road Transport and Highways Department said that the construction of the project is possible to start in the first month of 2023 subject to the approval of the prime minister. Its construction was initially scheduled to begin on 26 January 2023, but was moved to 2 February. Finally, the construction of the MRT Line 1 project was inaugurated by Sheikh Hasina in 2 February.

According to the information of the second meeting of the implementation committee of DMTCL released on 22 March 2023, the construction cost of the line may increase by ৳231.6 billion due to the need to increase the amount of land for acquisition by 39.17 acres and the increase in land prices. As of November 2024, the depot's land development is 75% complete. Tenders have been invited for the main part of the construction of the line as of January 2025.

On 7 January 2025, it was announced that a construction yard for the line would be built by building a steel post structure on the canal south of Kuril and placing metal sheets on it, and that there would be no construction yard after the construction work was completed. In 2025, DMTC officials stated that the construction of Line 1 could not be completed by 2026 and might take an additional 3-4 years. In the same year, a budget allocation of ৳86.31 billion was proposed for the line in the Annual Development Program for the next fiscal year. By February 2025, 90% of the land development work for Line 1 had been completed. In May 2025, the work of relocating utility lines from Nadda to Dhaka Airport was completed. However, instead of allowing utility relocation work on Bir Uttam Rafiqul Islam Sarani, the traffic authorities proposed the construction of an alternative street, which caused the construction work in the Badda to stall. On the other hand, in Package-8 of the construction project, allegations arose that the China Civil Engineering Construction Corporation was unfairly disqualified in the contractor selection process. Since the other contractors' proposed bids were higher, the interim government suspended the contractor appointment process.

India's Larsen & Toubro received design-and-build orders for two system packages of the Dhaka Mass Rapid Transit Development Project (Line 1) in October 2026 at a cost of over ₹5,000 crore (৳66 billion). The firm was also part of the electrical and mechanical work of the MRT Line 6 while its Jakarta MRT project is being executed. Thereafter, in November 2026, the CP06 project for the line was awarded to a joint venture led by Tata Projects with partner firms Nishimatsu Construction and Toda Corporation from Japan. The civil work project involves Architectural finishes, Mechanical, Electrical, Plumbing (MEP) for the construction of the main line for an underground length of 5.2 km (3.2 mi) with a shaft at the north endpoint along with three underground stations of Khilkhet, Airport Terminal 3 and Airport.

On 4 November 2026, Dhaka Mass Transit Company Limited signed a contract with a joint venture of Tokyu Construction and Max Infrastructure to build part of the airport route. The contract covers four underground stations and two single-track tunnels on the section from north of Rampura station to Notun Bazar.

== Stations ==
=== Airport route ===
Its length is 19.872 km which is going to be built entirely underground. This route will go from Hazrat Shahjalal International Airport to Kamalapur with 12 stations. Commuters can transfer to MRT Line 5 from Notun Bazaar Station via an interchange.

| Code | Name | | Connections | Location | Opened |
| Code | English | Bengali | Connections | Location | Opened |
|---|---|---|---|---|---|
| 1 | Airport | বিমানবন্দর | | Bimanbandar Thana | 2030 |
| 2 | Airport Terminal 3 | বিমানবন্দর টার্মিনাল ৩ | | Bimanbandar Thana | 2030 |
| 3 | Khilkhet | খিলক্ষেত | | Khilkhet Thana | 2030 |
| 4 | Nadda | নদ্দা | | Pragati Sarani | 2030 |
| 5 | Notun Bazar | নতুন বাজার | MRT Line 5N | Baridhara | 2030 |
| 6 | North Badda | উত্তর বাড্ডা | | Badda Thana | 2030 |
| 7 | Badda | বাড্ডা | | Badda Thana | 2030 |
| 8 | Aftabnagar | আফতাবনগর | MRT Line 5S | Aftabnagar | 2030 |
| 9 | Rampura | রামপুরা | | Rampura Thana | 2030 |
| 10 | Malibagh | মালিবাগ | | Malibagh | 2030 |
| 11 | Rajarbagh | রাজারবাগ | | Rajarbagh | 2030 |
| 12 | Kamalapur | কমলাপুর | Bus station Bangladesh Railway; MRT Line 2 MRT Line 4 MRT Line 6 | Motijheel Thana | 2030 |

=== Purbachal route ===
The 11.361 km route will have 9 stations. It can go from Purbachal New Town to Notun Bazar. Nadda and Notun Bazar stations will be constructed underground while the rest will be elevated. Both Nadda and Notun Bazar stations will have interchanges.

| Code | Name | | Connections | Location | Opened |
| Code | English | Bengali | Connections | Location | Opened |
|---|---|---|---|---|---|
| 1 | Notun Bazar | নতুন বাজার | MRT Line 5N | Baridhara | 2030 |
| 2 | Nadda | নদ্দা | | Pragati Sarani | 2030 |
| 3 | Joar Sahara | জোয়ার সাহারা | | Pragati Sarani | 2030 |
| 4 | Boalia | বোয়ালিয়া | | Purbachal Expressway | 2030 |
| 5 | Mostul | মস্তুল | | Purbachal Expressway | 2030 |
| 6 | Purbachal West (Note: Previous proposed name was "Sheikh Hasina Cricket Stadium metro station".) | পূর্বাচল পশ্চিম | | Pubachal | 2030 |
| 7 | Purbachal Centre | পূর্বাচল মধ্য | | Pubachal | 2030 |
| 8 | Purbachal East | পূর্বাচল পূর্ব | | Pubachal | 2030 |
| 9 | Purbachal Terminal | পূর্বাচল টার্মিনাল | | Pubachal | 2030 |

== Issues ==
MRT Line 1 will have seven stations on Purbachal Expressway which will be on elevated line. Before construction began, it was known that the expressway might be damaged during the construction of the stations. MM Ehsan Jamil, director of the expressway construction project, claimed that he had demanded the metro authority to construct seven stations in Purbachal section underground. But it became impossible as the construction contract with JICA was done before that. Therefore, he suggested to start the work on the eastern part of MRT Line 1 with the construction of the expressway earlier to avoid damage to the expressway, but it could not be done due to various issues. Later, 4 meters space was left in the median strip of the expressway for the construction of the metro. Later the secretary of Road Transport and Highways Division assured that the construction of the line would be done in a coordinated manner so as not to cause major damage to the expressway. He also informed that the pillar of the line will be built on the median strip and the two columns of the station will be built on the green space on both sides of the expressway so that no space on the road will be used. On 19 February 2025, the chief of the project stated that while the road itself would not be damaged during construction, its pavement surface might sustain some damage. However, any affected pavement would be repaired after the construction work was completed. On 9 August 2025, the landowners of the acquired land for construction in Rampura claimed that their compensation was less than the market value and questioned the necessity of having three stations within one and a half kilometers. They demanded either fair compensation or the exclusion of the Rampura metro station.
