= MRT Line 5 =

Mass rapid transit line of Dhaka Metro

Mass Rapid Transit Line 5

Overview
- Status: Approved
- Owner: Road Transport and Highways Division
- Locale: Greater Dhaka, Bangladesh
- Stations: 29

Service
- Type: Rapid transit
- System: Dhaka Metro Rail
- Operator: Dhaka Mass Transit Company Limited
- Depots: Hemayetpur, Savar Upazila; Dasherkandi
- Daily ridership: 1,230,000 (estimated)

Technical
- Line length: Northern Route: 20 kilometres (12 mi); Southern route: 17.3 kilometres (10.7 mi)
- Number of tracks: 2
- Character: Elevated and underground
Route map

The MRT Line 5 (Bengali: এমআরটি লাইন ৫, romanised: Em-Ar-Ti Lain Pachh) is an approved mass rapid transit line of Dhaka Metro Rail, in Bangladesh. It will be the third line of the Dhaka Metro Rail system and comprise the Northern Route and Southern Route. The construction of the MRT Line 5's Northern Route began on 5 November 2023 and is scheduled to commence operation by December 2032.

== Background ==
In 2005, the World Bank published a study report, recommending that the government of Bangladesh build a mass transit system in Dhaka. In the same year, American consultancy firm Louis Berger Group prepared a strategic transport plan for Dhaka. The World Bank helped to develop this plan, which proposed the construction of five MRT lines in Dhaka. The five metro lines were MRT Line 1, MRT Line 2, MRT Line 4, MRT Line 5 and MRT Line 6.

== Stations ==
=== Northern Route ===
The construction of the Northern Route of the MRT Line 5 will start in July 2023 and will end by December 2032.

Code	Name		Connections	Location	Opened
Code	English	Bengali	Connections	Location	Opened
1	Hemayetpur	হেমায়েতপুর		Savar Upazila	Planned
2	Baliarpur	বালিয়ারপুর		Savar Upazila	Planned
3	Bilamalia	বিলামালিয়া		Savar Upazila	Planned
4	Amin Bazar	আমিনবাজার		Savar Upazila	Planned
5	Gabtoli	গাবতলী	MRT Line 2 MRT Line 5S	Mirpur Model Thana	Planned
6	Darus Salam	দারুস সালাম		Darus Salam Thana	Planned
7	Mirpur 1	মিরপুর ১		Mirpur Model Thana	Planned
8	Mirpur 10	মিরপুর ১০	MRT Line 6	Mirpur Model Thana	Planned
9	Mirpur 14	মিরপুর ১৪		Mirpur Model Thana	Planned
10	Kochukhet	কচুক্ষেত		Cantonment Thana	Planned
11	Banani	বনানী		Banani Thana	Planned
12	Gulshan 2	গুলশান ২		Gulshan Thana	Planned
13	Notun Bazar	নতুন বাজার	MRT Line 1	Vatara Thana	Planned
14	Vatara	ভাটারা		Vatara Thana	Planned

=== Southern Route ===
The Southern Route of MRT Line 5 is still in the planning stages. There may be changes to the list of stations, including adding new stations, assigning different names to the stations or some stations getting eliminated from the line. Hence, the list of stations is not final and may be updated in the future.

Code	Name		Connections	Location	Opened
Code	English	Bengali	Connections	Location	Opened
1	Gabtoli	গাবতলী	MRT Line 2 MRT Line 5N	Mirpur Model Thana	Planned
2	Technical	টেকনিক্যাল		Darus Salam Thana	Planned
3	Kallyanpur	কল্যাণপুর		Mirpur Model Thana	Planned
4	Shyamoli	শ্যামলী		Adabar Thana	Planned
5	College Gate	কলেজ গেট		Tejgaon Thana	Planned
6	Asad Gate	আসাদ গেট		Mohammadpur Thana	Planned
7	Russel Square	রাসেল স্কয়ার		Dhanmondi Thana	Planned
8	Karwan Bazar	কাওরান বাজার	MRT Line 6	Tejgaon Thana	Planned
9	Hatirjheel	হাতিরঝিল		Hatirjheel Thana	Planned
10	Tejgaon	তেজগাঁও		Tejgaon Industrial Area Thana	Planned
11	Aftabnagar	আফতাবনগর	MRT Line 1	Badda Thana	Planned
12	Aftabnagar Center	আফতাবনগর সেন্টার		Badda Thana	Planned
13	Aftabnagar East	আফতাবনগর পূর্ব		Badda Thana	Planned
11	Nasirabad	নাসিরাবাদ		Badda Thana	Planned
15	Desherkandi	দাশেরকান্দি		Badda Thana	Planned
