= Madanpur Union =

Madanpur Union মদনপুর ইউনিয়ন
- Location within Bangladesh
- Country: Bangladesh
- Division: Dhaka Division
- District: Narayanganj district
- Upazila: Bandar Upazila

Government
  - Type: Union Council
- Time zone: UTC+6 (BST)

Madanpur Union (Bengali: মদনপুর ইউনিয়ন) is a Union of Bandar Upazila in the District and Division of Dhaka, Bangladesh. It has a population of 11,154 men and 10,119 women. The Union has a literacy rate of 56.5 per cent.
