= Pragati Sarani =

Road in Dhaka, Bangladesh

Progati Sarani
- Bir Uttam Rafiqul Islam Avenue
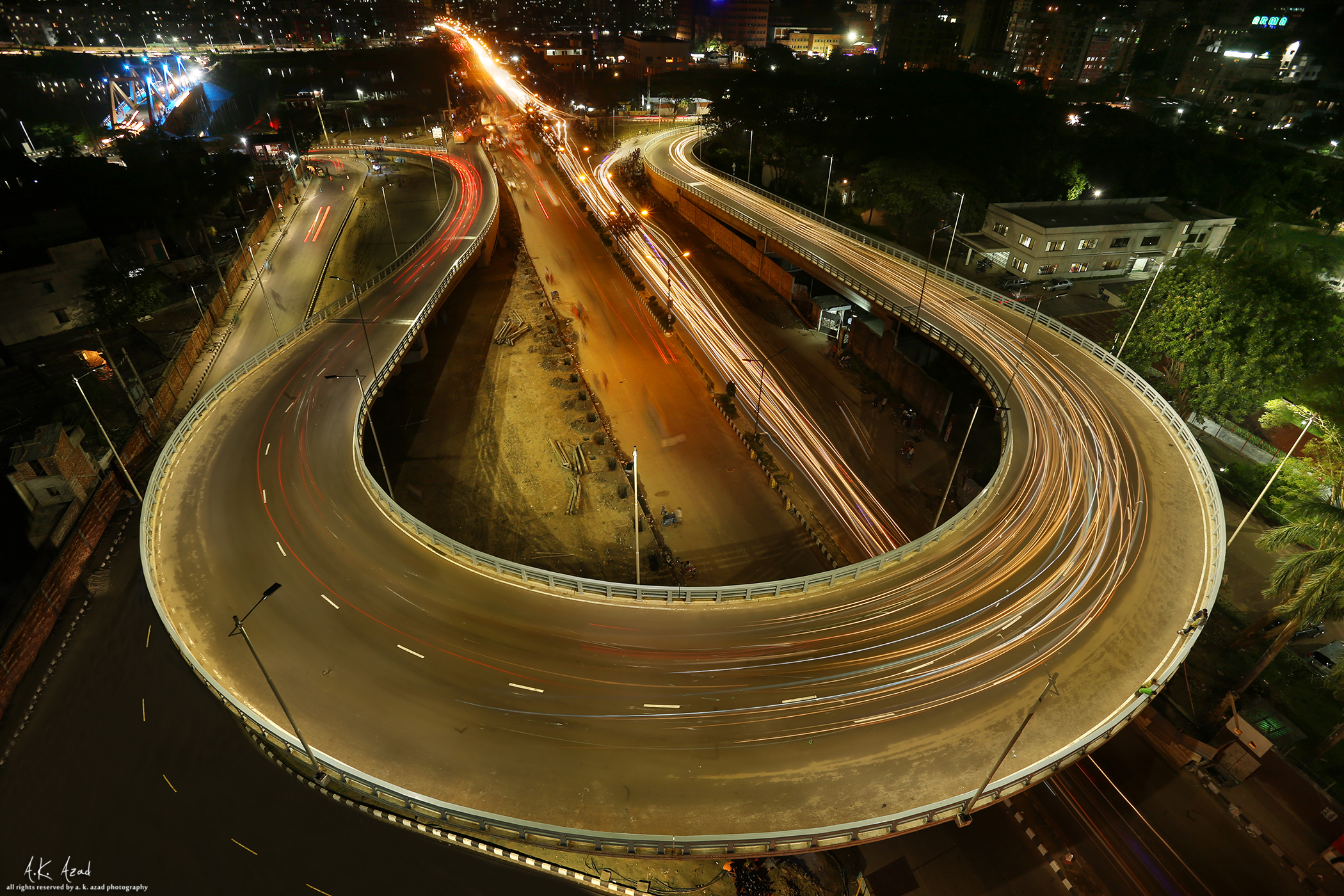
- Badda U Loop in the Progati Sarani avenue
- Namesake: Bir Uttam Rafiqul Islam
- Type: Avenue
- Maintained by: Dhaka North City Corporation
- Length: 6 km (3.7 mi)
- Location: Dhaka
- South end: Rampura
- North end: Kuril Flyover

Progati Sarani is a major avenue in Dhaka, Bangladesh, which connects Rampura to Kuril Flyover. In 2014, the Dhaka North City Corporation officially renamed it as Bir Uttam Rafiqul Islam Avenue. However, it is still widely known as Pragati Sarani.
