= Dutch-Bangla Bank =

Private-sector bank in Bangladesh

Dutch-Bangla Bank PLC.

- Type: Public Limited Company
- Traded as: DSE: DUTCHBANGL; CSE: DUTCHBANGL
- Industry: Banking; Financial services
- Founded: 1996; 30 years ago
- Headquarters: Motijheel, Dhaka, Bangladesh
- Number of locations: 243 branches, 350 sub-branches and 5,622 Agent Outlets .(As on date 31 August, 2026)
- Area served: Bangladesh
- Key people: Ms. Sadia Rayen Ahmed (Chairman), Mr. Md Ahteshamul Haque Khan (Managing Director & CEO)
- Products: Retail banking, corporate banking, mortgage loans, private banking, credit cards, mobile banking
- Operating income: ▲ ৳ 26.147 billion (US$ 214 million) (2025)
- Net income: ▲ ৳ 9.648 billion (US$ 79 million) (2025)
- Total assets: ▲ ৳ 817.798 billion (US$ 6.7 billion) (2025)
- Number of employees: 8965 (2026)
- Website: www.dutchbanglabank.com

Dutch-Bangla Bank PLC. (Bengali: ডাচ্-বাংলা ব্যাংক পিএলসি.), one of the private commercial banks of Bangladesh, started its operation in Bangladesh as the first European joint venture bank. The bank was an effort by local shareholders spearheaded by Mr. M. Sahabuddin Ahmed (Founder Chairman) and the Nederlandse Financierings-Maatschappij voor Ontwikkelingslanden N.V.(FMO), the Netherlands Development Finance Company.

== History ==
Dutch-Bangla Bank PLC was established under the Bank Company Act 1991 and incorporated as a public limited company under the Companies Act 1994 in Bangladesh in June 1996. It was the first European-Bangladeshi joint venture bank in Bangladesh, established through a partnership between a Netherlands-based company and a Bangladeshi individual. DBBL commenced formal operation from June 3, 1996. The Bank is listed with the Dhaka Stock Exchange Limited and Chittagong Stock Exchange Limited.

In 2002, Dutch-Bangla Bank PLC established the Electronic Banking Division to accelerate banking automation and introduce modern electronic banking services in Bangladesh.

In 2003, The bank completed full banking automation, becoming the first fully automated bank in Bangladesh and introducing electronic banking and plastic card services to the mass market.

In 2004, The bank introduced real-time online “Any Branch Banking”, enabling customers to conduct transactions from any branch nationwide. It also expanded digital infrastructure by launching Internet Banking, establishing a centralized Data Center, and introducing Debit Cards, ATM services, and POS terminals, which significantly expanded electronic payment facilities in Bangladesh.

In 2007, The bank expanded its card portfolio by launching Credit Card services, further strengthening electronic payment solutions.

In 2008, Fast Track self-service banking centers were introduced to provide customers with 24/7 automated banking facilities through integrated ATM and self-service kiosks.

In 2010, The bank launched the country’s first Internet Payment Gateway (IPG) named Nexus Payment Gateway, enabling merchants to accept Visa, MasterCard, and Nexus card payments online, thereby facilitating e-commerce in Bangladesh. Later, Rocket account also incorporated in Nexus Payment Gateway. In the same year, the bank received approval from Bangladesh Bank to introduce Mobile Financial Services (MFS).DBBL first to introduce mobile banking | The Daily Star

In 2011, The bank launched Mobile Financial Services, later branded as Rocket, which pioneered mobile banking in Bangladesh and significantly promoted financial inclusion among unbanked populations. The bank also established a Customer Call Center to strengthen customer service and support.

In 2016, The bank introduced VIP Banking Lounge services to provide premium banking facilities for high-value customers.

In 2017, Agent Banking services were introduced to extend banking access to rural and underserved communities through authorized agents.

In 2018, The bank launched NexusPay, a digital payment application enabling card-based payments, QR payments, and fund transfers.

In 2020, Introduced Prepaid Card services, expanding digital payment options for customers.

In 2022, Implemented Cash Recycler Machine(CRM) systems at branches to enhance customer engagement and service efficiency.

In 2023, Launched Bancassurance services, enabling customers to access insurance products through the bank’s distribution network.

== Dutch-Bangla Bank Network ==
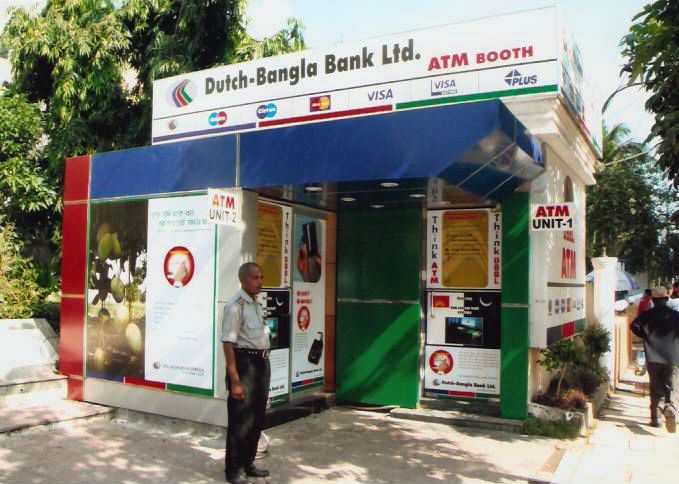
A DBBL Nexus ATM booth.

Dutch-Bangla Bank PLC (DBBL) operates one of Bangladesh's largest technology-enabled banking networks. According to the DBBL Annual Report 2025, the bank had 243 branches, 334 sub-branches, 5,631 agent banking outlets, 4,887 CRMs, 4,151 ATMs, 1,511 Fast Tracks, and 20,366 POS merchants. Its digital network included 9.1 million NexusPay users and 39.63 million Rocket accounts.

DBBL's extensive CRM/ATM, branch, agent banking, and digital banking infrastructure provides nationwide access to banking and payment services and remains a key component of its technology-driven banking strategy.

== NexusPay ==
NexusPay is the flagship digital banking app of Dutch-Bangla Bank PLC and is recognized as one of the most popular digital banking platforms in Bangladesh. It is known as the country’s first fully cardless banking solution, supporting Nexus, Visa, MasterCard, Rocket, Agent Banking, and other bank cards within a single app.

Users can perform QR and NFC-based merchant payments, bill payments, fund transfers, and cardless ATM withdrawals through the platform. NexusPay also offers temporary virtual card numbers for secure online transactions and supports interbank transfers through NPSB and BEFTN.

More than 180,000 merchants across Bangladesh accept NexusPay payments, strengthening its nationwide digital payment ecosystem. As of March 2026, Dutch-Bangla Bank reported that over 9.45 million users were actively using the NexusPay app, reflecting its strong adoption and customer trust.

The app continues to receive regular updates, with an expanding range of digital banking features designed to meet evolving customer needs and enhance the overall user experience.

== Internet payment ==
On 3 June 2010, Dutch Bangla Bank announced internet payments gateway system (Nexus Gateway). Using their Internet Payment Gateway merchants are able to charge their customers' Visa, Masters, DBBL Nexus and Maestro cards online. Presently DBBL has more than 400 e-commerce Merchants. Mobile Apps: DBBL Recently Launched Nexus Pay App For Their Customers.

== Rocket (mobile financial service) ==
Rocket is a mobile financial service, which pioneered the service in Bangladesh. The service is the third most popular MFS provider, with 18.1% market share as of FY 2022.

== Social work ==
Dutch Bangla Bank, under the visionary leadership of its Founder Chairman, Mr. M. Sahabuddin Ahmed, has been actively engaged in CSR activities since its inception in 1996, with social responsibility remaining a core priority of the Bank, carried forward through its Foundation.

Each year, DBBL allocates a significant amount of funds to its Foundation to support various initiatives aimed at the socio-economic development of underprivileged communities. The Bank’s honorable Board of Directors and valued shareholders consistently support these efforts.

Over the years, Dutch-Bangla Bank has made significant contributions through numerous initiatives, including its regular scholarship program, as well as the provision of free cataract surgeries and cleft lip treatments for those in need, ensuring that all eligible individuals receive these services at no cost.

A glimpse of a few such initiatives is presented below:

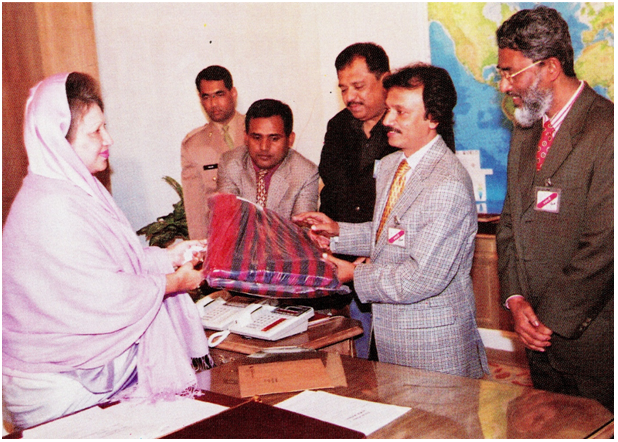

Dutch-Bangla Bank Limited donated blankets for the cold-hit people of the country. As a part of the blanket distribution program, Mr. M. Sahabuddin Ahmed, Chairman of Dutch-Bangla Bank Limited, is handing over blankets to the honorable Prime Minister Begum Khaleda Zia for the Prime Minister's Relief Fund (Year 2002).Dutch-Bangla Bank

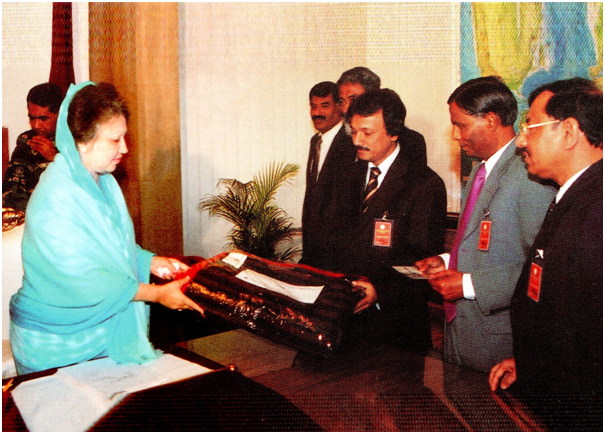

To support the people affected by the earthquake in Iran, Dutch-Bangla Bank Limited donated BDT 1 million and 5,000 blankets to the Honorable Prime Minister’s Relief Fund (2003). In the picture, the bank’s Chairman, Mr. M. Sahabuddin Ahmed, is seen handing over the blankets and the payment order to the Honorable Prime Minister, Khaleda Zia.

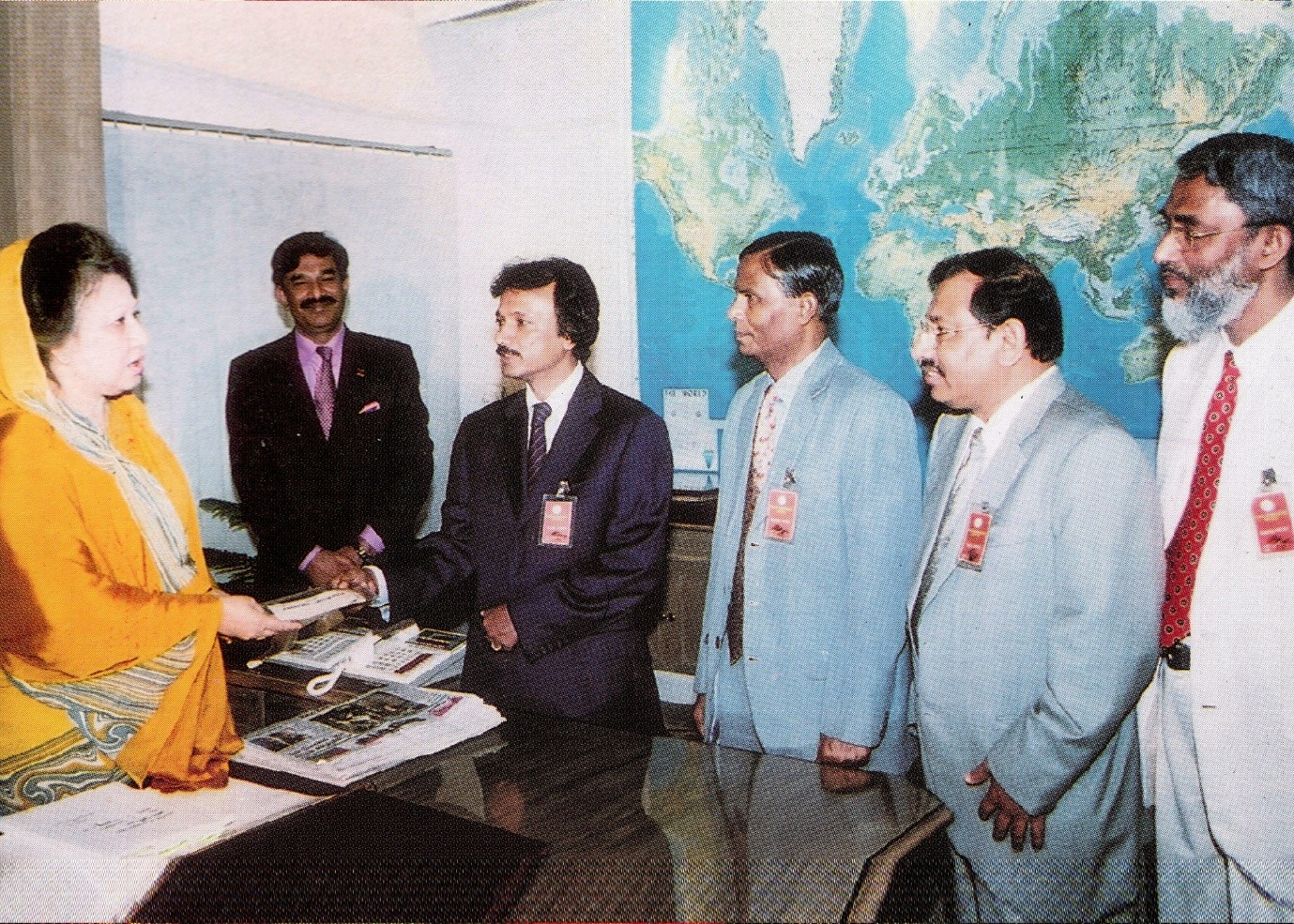

Mr. M. Sahabuddin Ahmed, Chairman, Dutch-Bangla Bank Limited is handing over a Payment Order of Taka 5.00 million to the Honorable Prime Minister Begum Khaleda Zia for rehabilitation of the flood affected people (Year 2004).

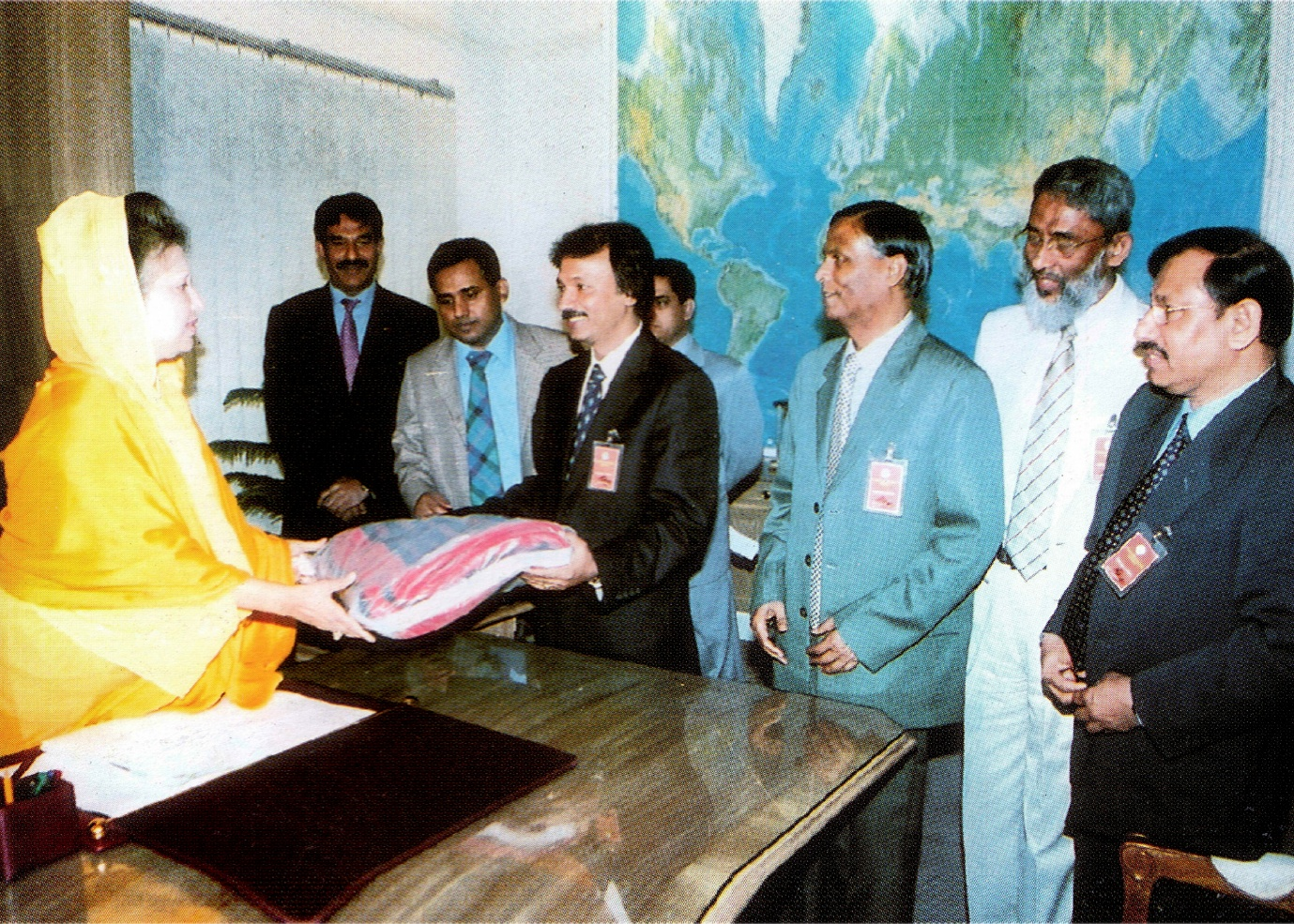

Mr. M. Sahabuddin Ahmed, Chairman, Dutch-Bangla Bank Limited is handing over a sample of blanket to the Honorable Prime Minister Begum Khaleda Zia, Government of the People's Republic Of Bangladesh. A total number Of 20,000 blankets was donated to the Prime Minister's Relief Fund for the cold stricken people of the Country (Year 2004).

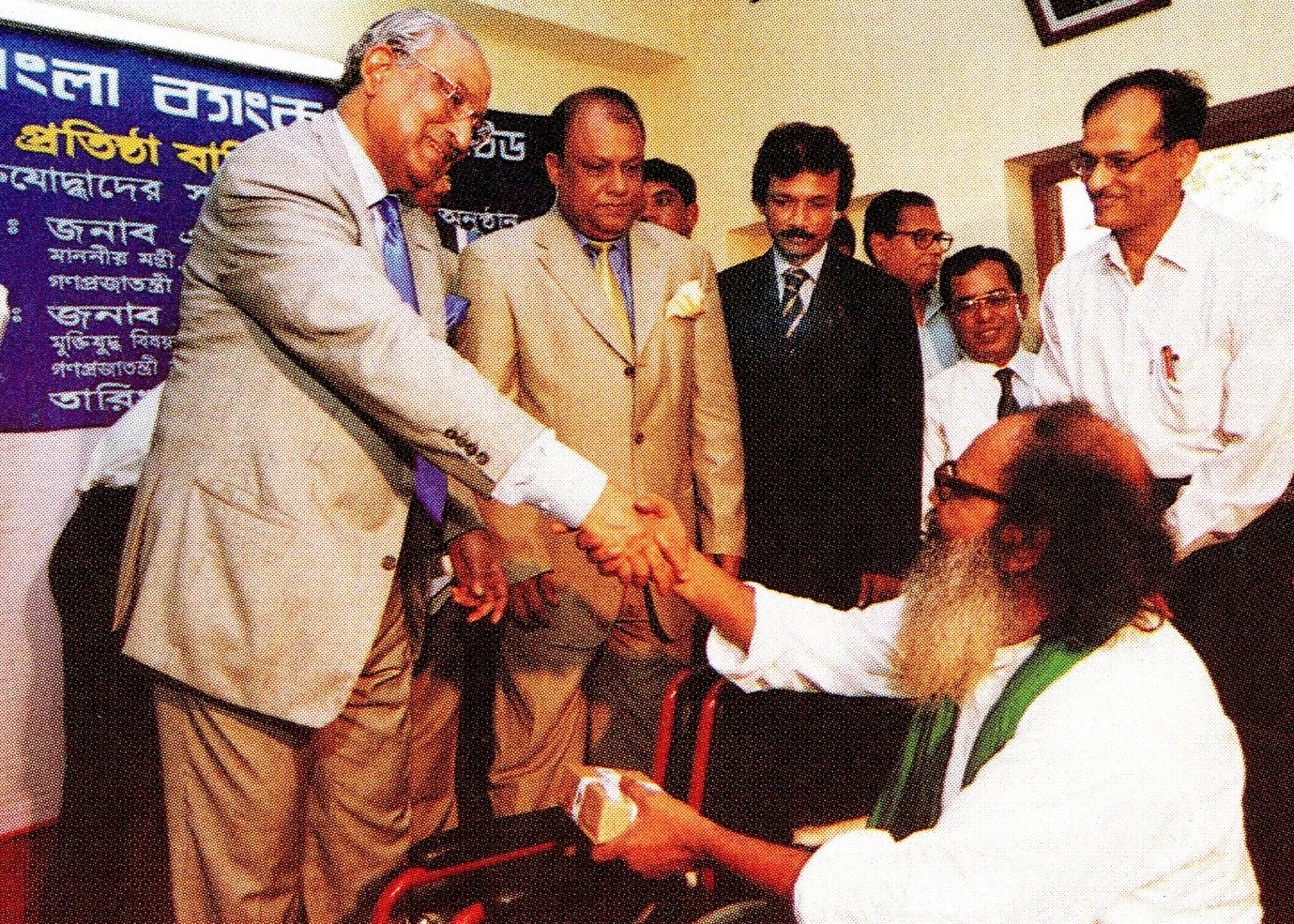

The Bank donated one wheel-chair and Prize Bonds equivalent to Tk 50,000/- each to twenty three War-wounded freedom fighters. Mr. M. Saifur Rahman, Minister for Finance and Planning is distributing the same at the War Wounded Freedom Fighters' Rest House while Mr. Redwan Ahmed, State Minister, Ministry of Liberation War Affairs and Mr. M. Sahabuddin Ahmed, Chairman of the Bank looks on (Year 2002).

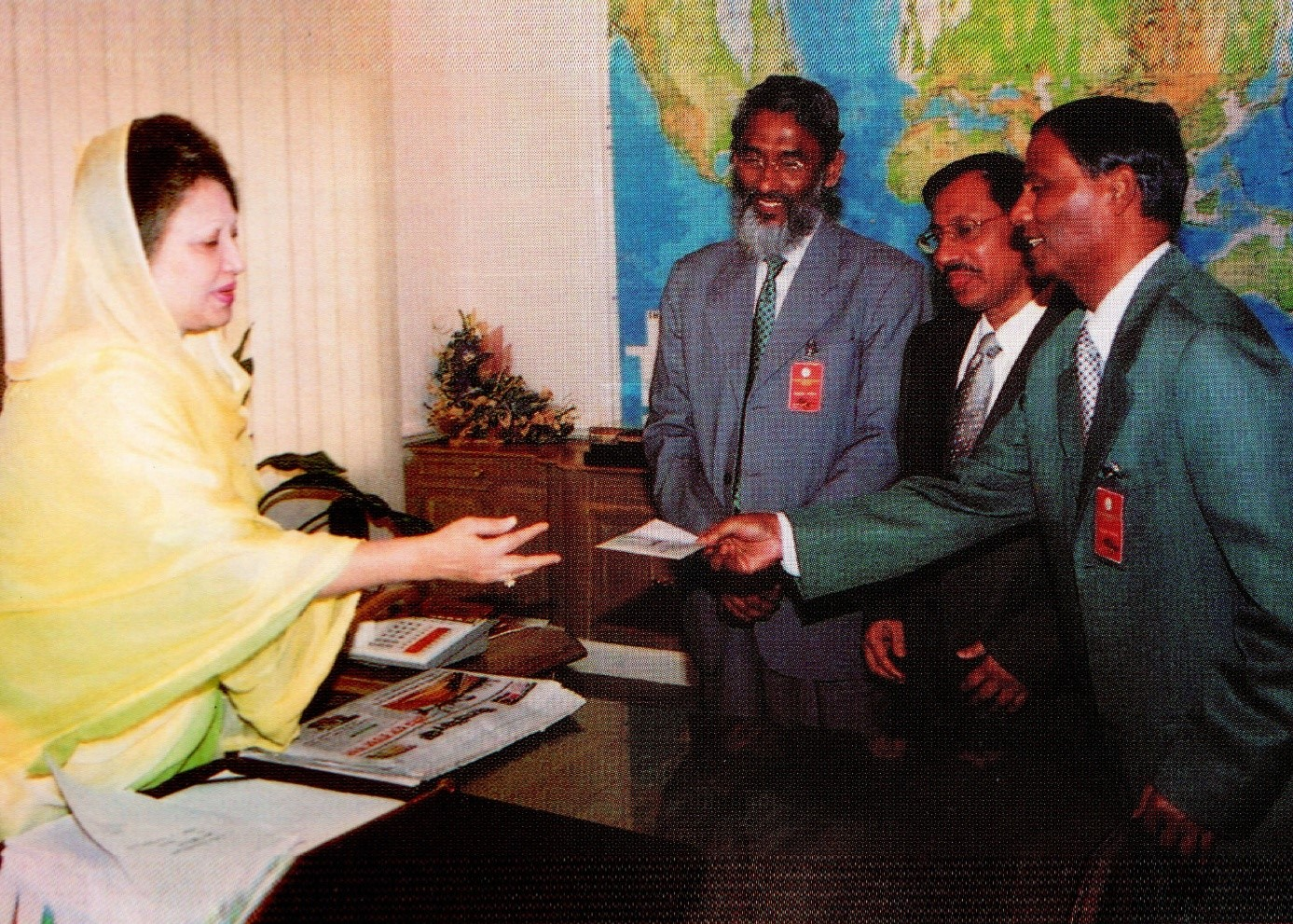

Dutch-Bangla Bank Limited donated BDT 2.7 million to the Prime Minister’s Zakat Fund. On this occasion, the bank’s Managing Director, Mr. Md. Yasin Ali, is seen handing over the payment order to the Honorable Prime Minister Begum Khaleda Zia (Year 2003).

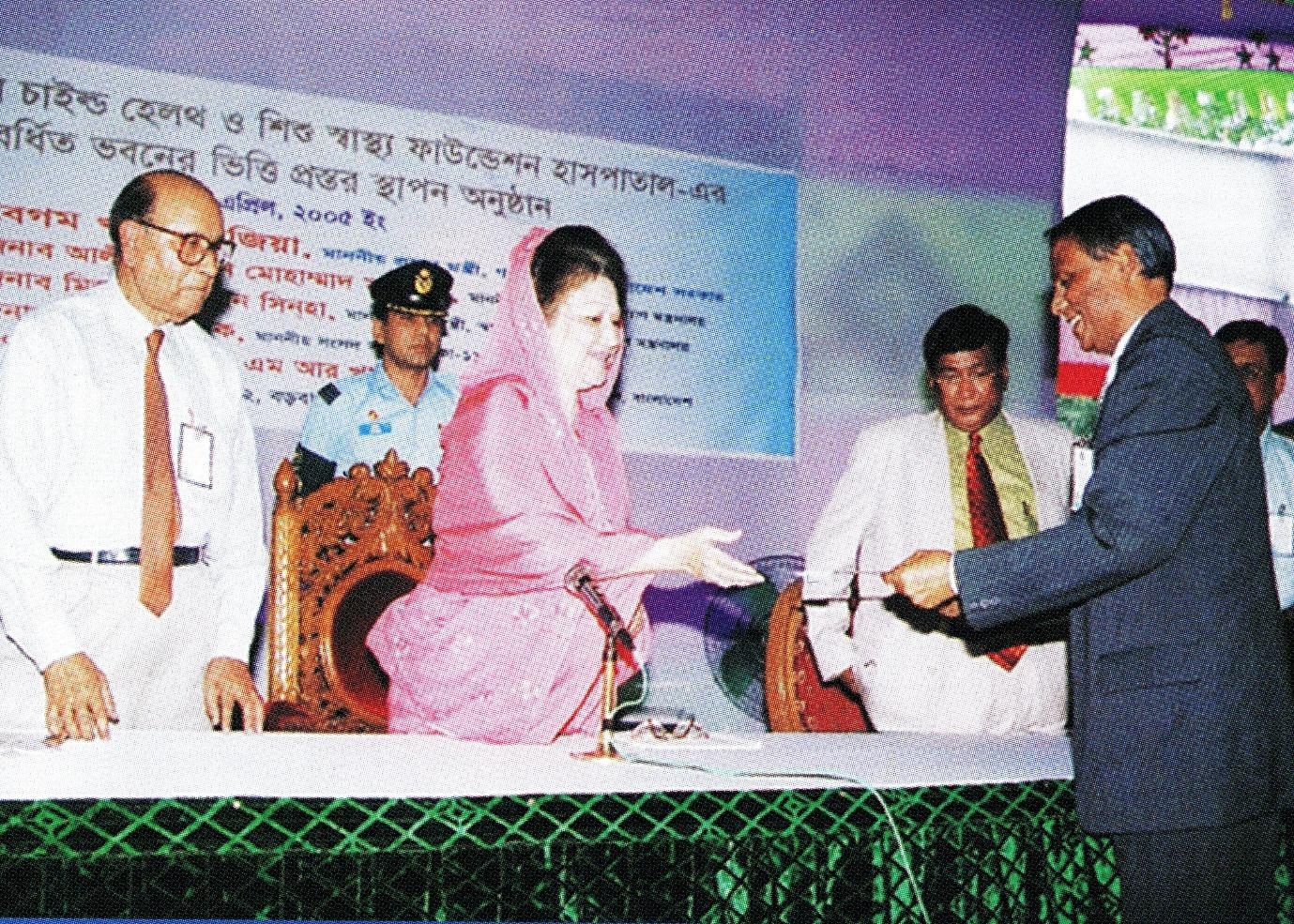

Dutch-Bangla Bank Limited has provided financial assistance of BDT 1.20 crore for the construction of the Institute of Child Health and Shishu Shasthya Foundation Hospital. The bank’s Managing Director, Mr. Md. Yasin Ali, is handing over the letter of commitment to the Honorable Prime Minister of the Government of the People’s Republic of Bangladesh, Begum Khaleda Zia (Year 2005).

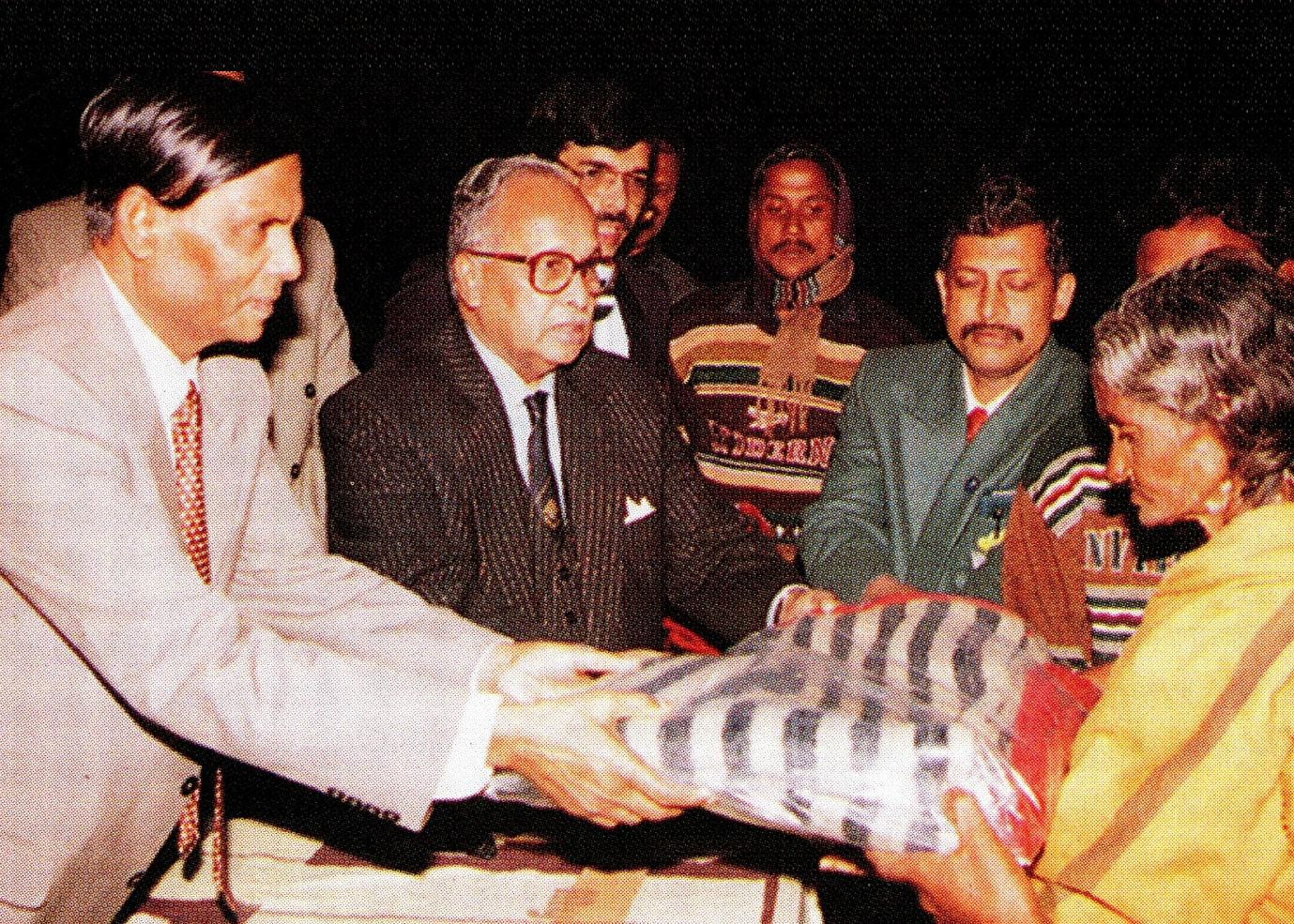

Barrister Muhammad Jamiruddin Sircar, Honourable Speaker of the Jatiya Sangshad and Mr. Md. Yeasin Ali, Managing Director of the Bank are seen distributing blankets in the northern parts of the country (Year 2002).

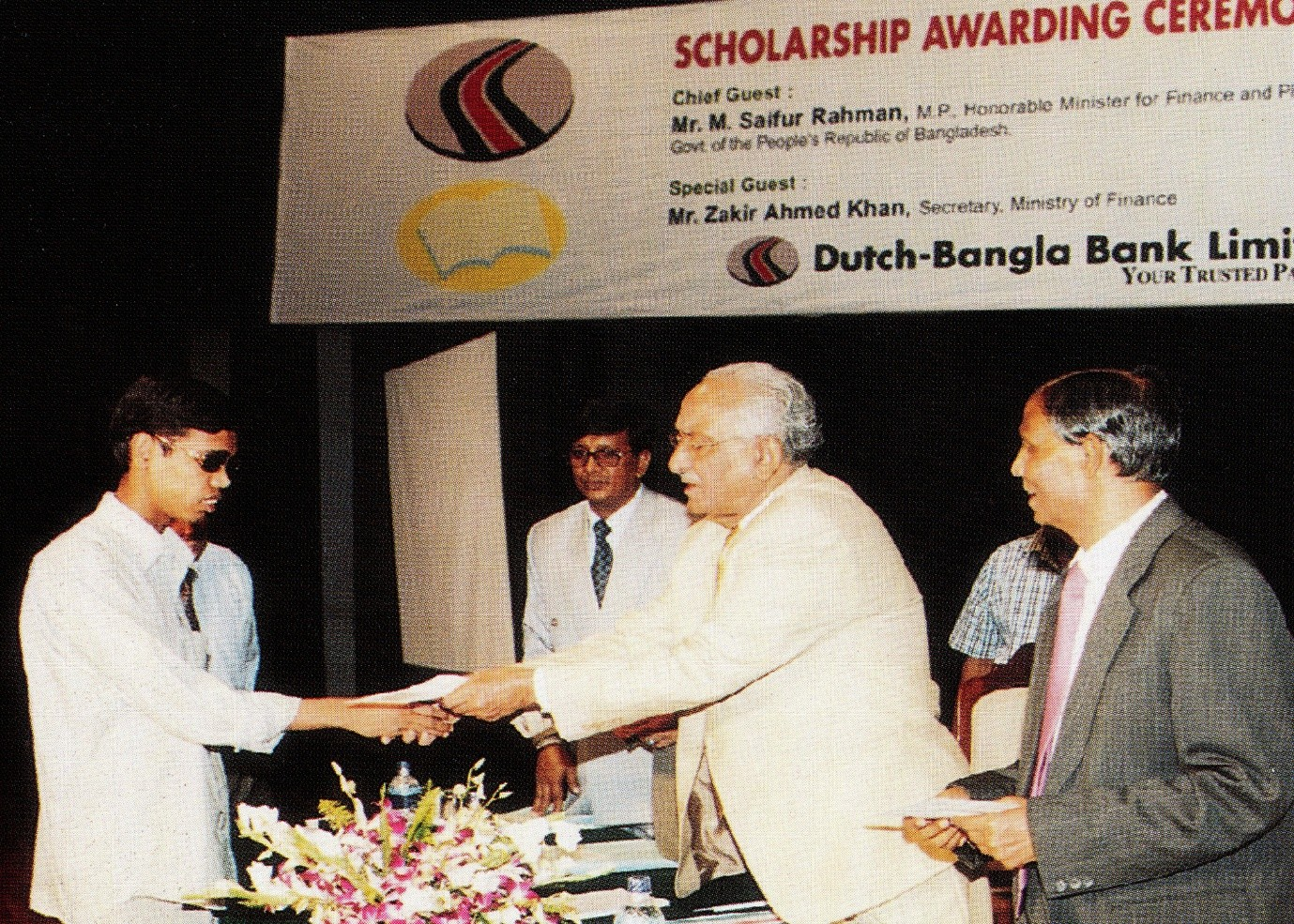

DBBL so far awarded 500 scholarships to students, in a scholarship awarding ceremony held at Osmani Memorial Auditorium, Mr. M. Saifur Rahman, MP, Honorable Minister of Finance and Planning is seen handing over scholarship letter to a visually impaired student (Year 2004).

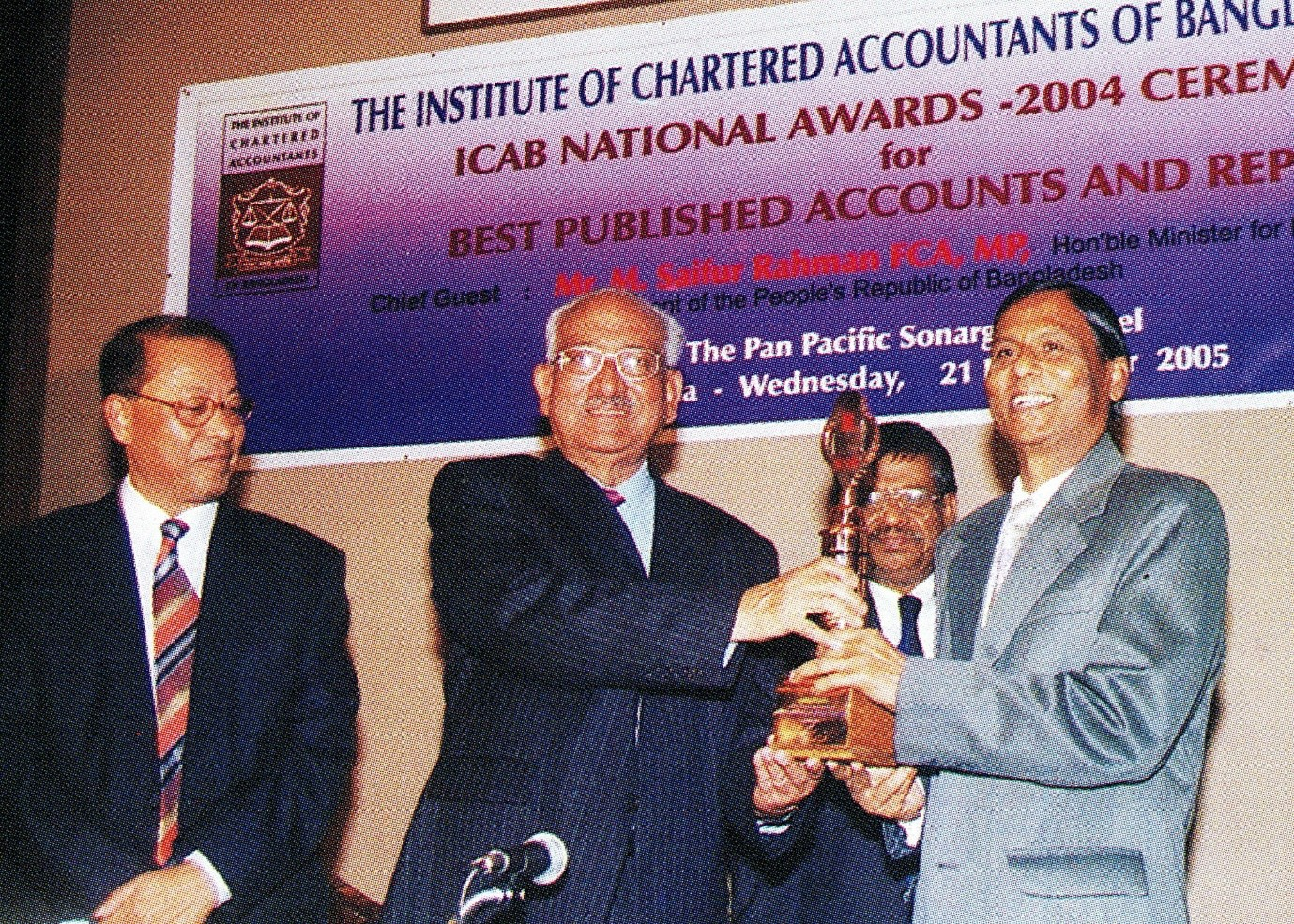

In 2004, Dutch-Bangla Bank received an award from the Institute of Chartered Accountants of Bangladesh (ICAB) for the objective publication of its ‘Accounts and Reports’. The bank’s Managing Director, Md. Yasin Ali, received the award from the then Finance and Planning Minister, M. Saifur Rahman, MP (Year 2005).

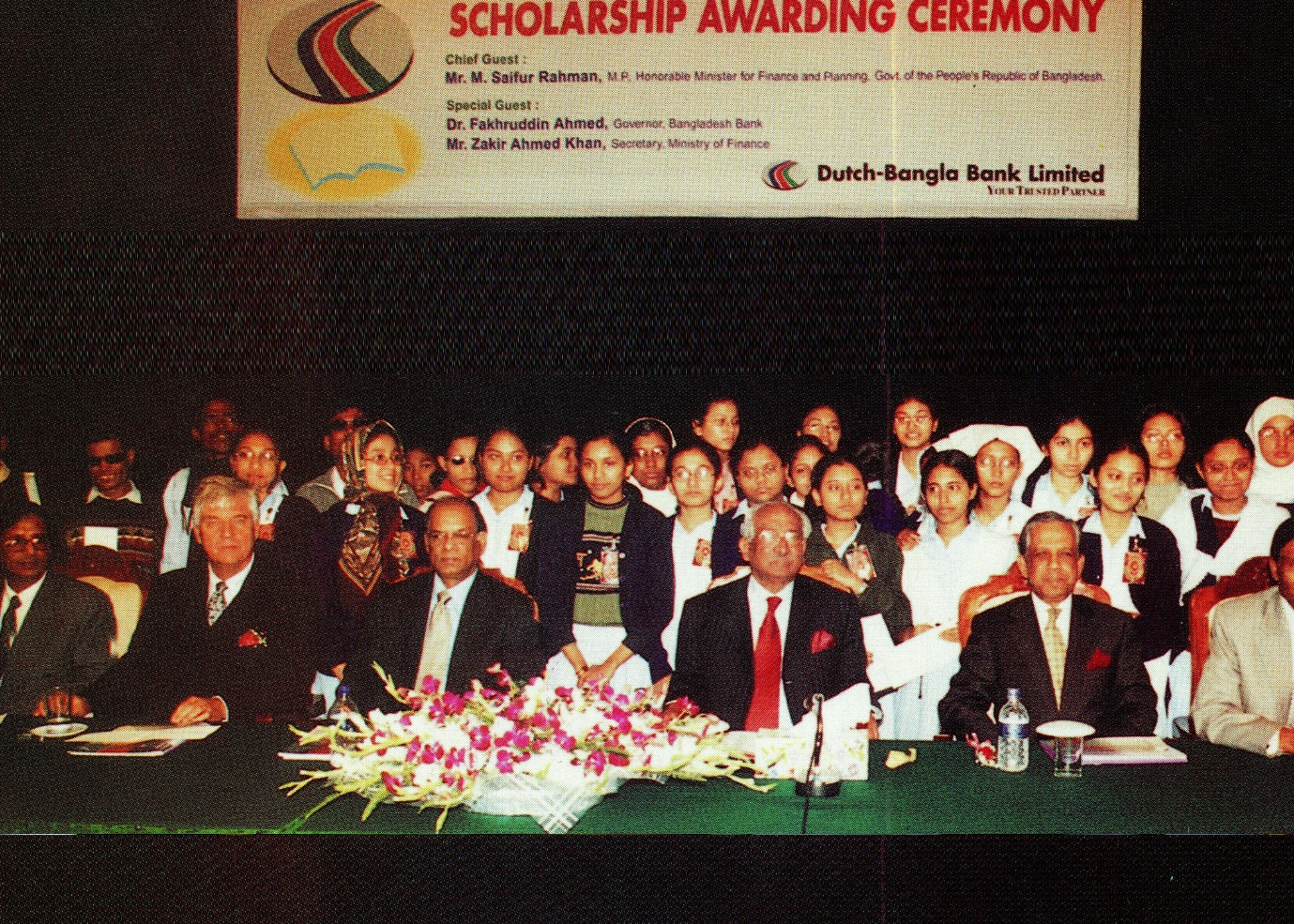

The Honorable Finance and Planning Minister M. Saifur Rahman, MP, is seen among the scholarship recipients of the Dutch-Bangla Bank Foundation. On this occasion, Fakhruddin Ahmed, Governor of Bangladesh Bank; Mr. Zakir Ahmed Khan, Secretary of the Ministry of Finance; and Mr. J. L. Ijzermans, Ambassador of the Royal Netherlands Embassy, were present at the event (Year 2003).

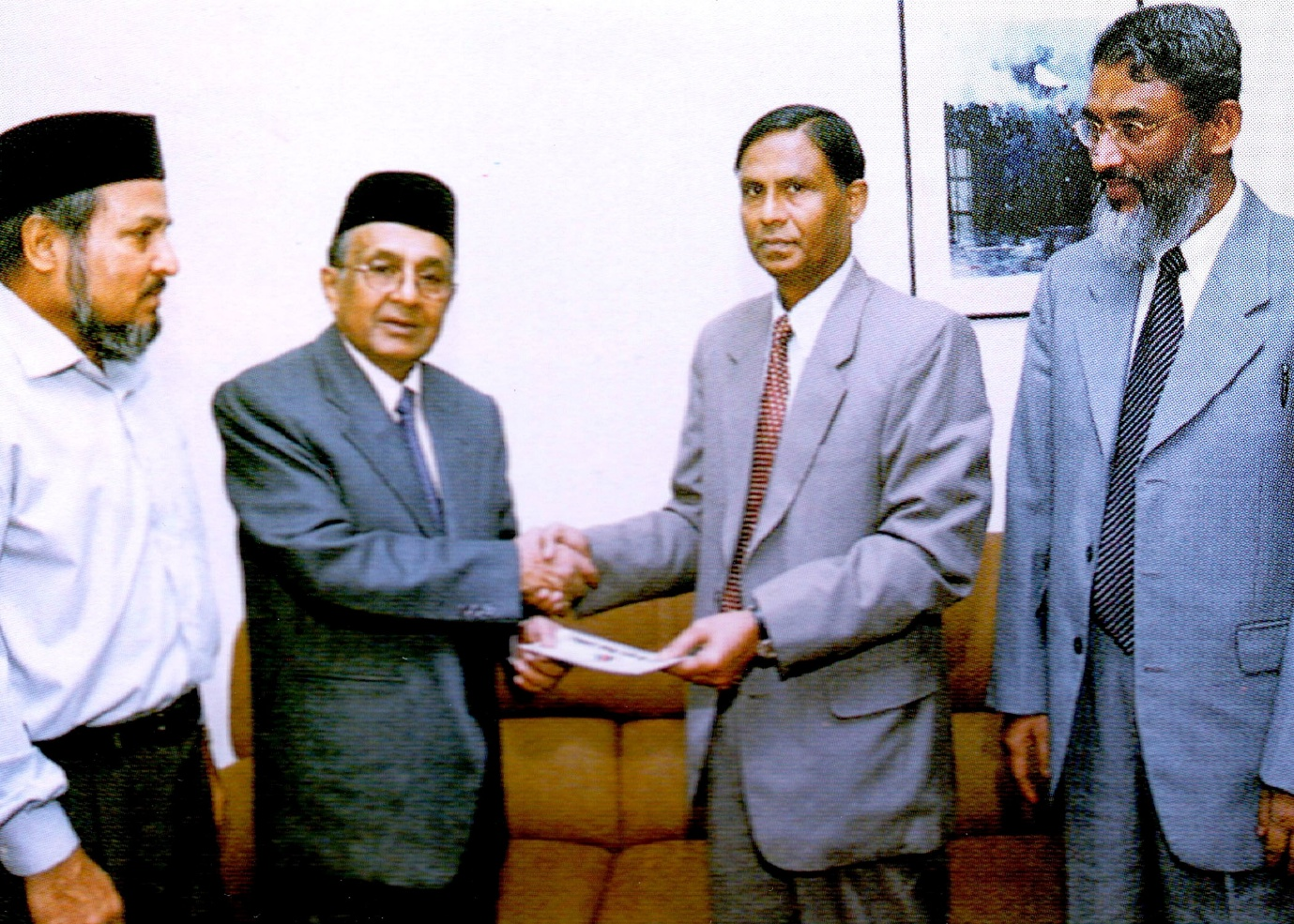

Mr. Md. Yeasin Ali, Managing Director of DBBL hands over a pay-order worth Tk 20 lac to the State Minister for Religious Affairs, Mr. Mosharref Hossain Shahjahan for the Prime Minister's Zakat Fund (Year 2002).
