= House Building, Uttara =

House Building হাউজ বিল্ডিং
- Area of Uttara
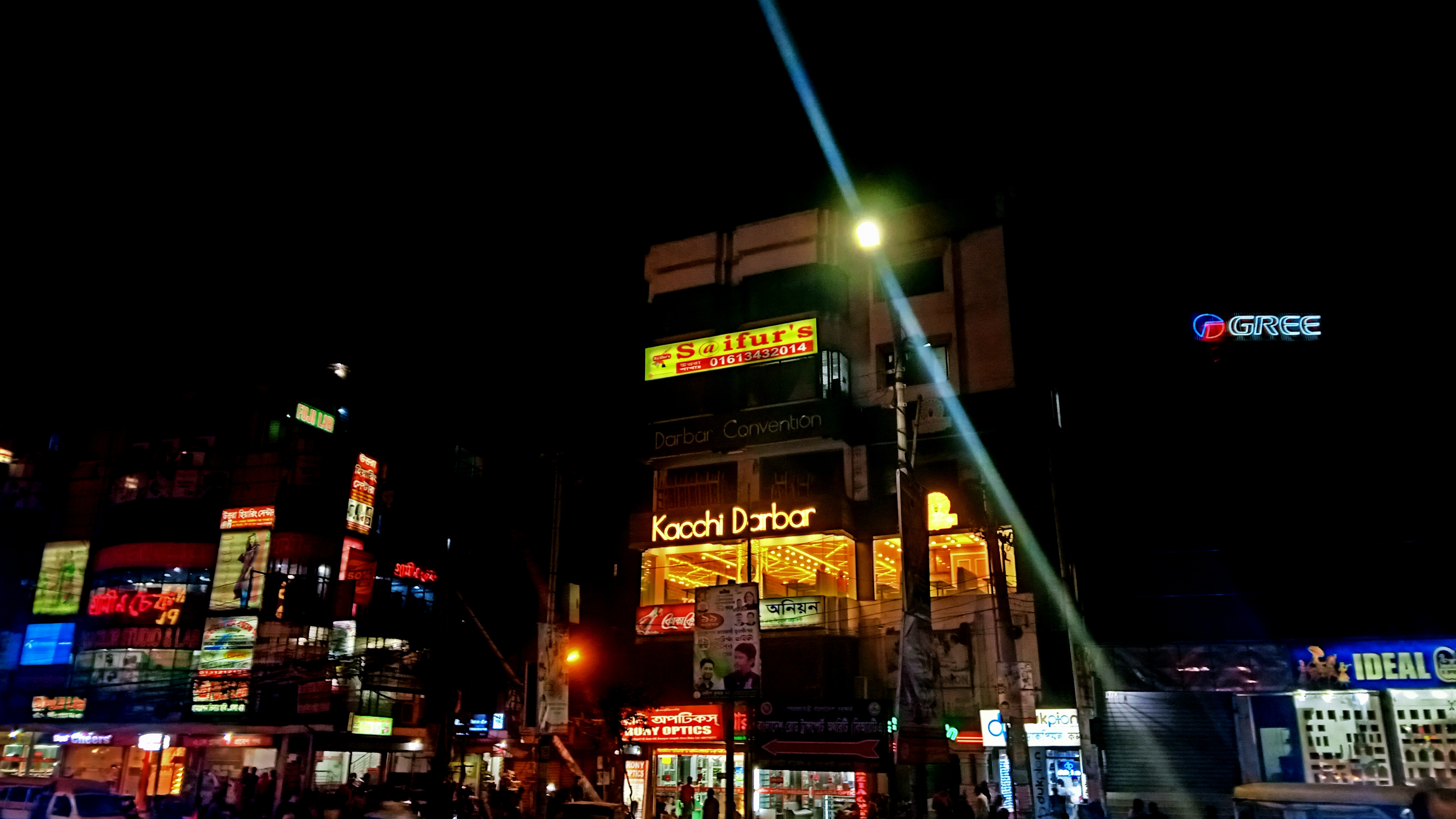
- House Building at night

- Location in House Building, Dhaka, Bangladesh
- Coordinates: 23.874573°N 90.400394°E ,
- Country: Bangladesh
- Division: Dhaka Division
- District: Dhaka District
- Elevation: 23 m (75 ft)
- Time zone: UTC+6 (BST)
- Postal code: 1230

House Building (Bengali: হাউজ বিল্ডিং) is an area of Uttara, a suburb of Dhaka, Bangladesh. There is a bus stop in the same name. The name comes from the Bangladesh House Building Finance Corporation located in the area.

This area has been used many times by the protesters to protest. In 2015, students of private universities were staging strikes and demonstrations in various areas, demanding repeal of VAT imposed on tuition fees. House Building was one of those areas.

Under the banner of safe road movement students protested in the area after three years.

In 2019, several garment workers protested by blocking the house building on the Dhaka-Mymensingh highway demanding various things including arrears of salary and government approved lowest limit of wage.

In 2021, a group of protesters gathered in the area for their nine demands in order to make roads safe. They were mainly students

== See also ==
- Azampur, Uttara
