= Road Transport and Highways Division =

- সড়ক পরিবহন ও মহাসড়ক বিভাগ
- Government Seal of Bangladesh

Agency overview
- Formed: 10 February 2014; 12 years ago
- Jurisdiction: Government of Bangladesh
- Headquarters: Bangladesh Secretariat, Dhaka
- Minister of State responsible: Habibur Rashid Habib
- Agency executive: Md. Ehsanul Haque, Senior Secretary
- Parent agency: Ministry of Road Transport and Bridges
- Child agencies: Bangladesh Road Transport Authority; Bangladesh Road Transport Corporation; Dhaka Transport Coordination Authority; Dhaka Bus Rapid Transit Company Limited; Roads and Highways Department
- Website: Road Transport and Highways Division

Road Transport and Highways Division (সড়ক পরিবহন ও মহাসড়ক বিভাগ) is a Bangladeshi government division under the Ministry of Road Transport and Bridges responsible for roads and highways. The division is headed by Md. Ehsanul Haque.

== History ==
Road Transport and Highways Division signed an agreement with the government of Japan worth 88 billion Taka to build three bridges and one flyover. The department drafted the Road Transport Act in 2017 which was subsequently approved by the cabinet of Bangladesh.

== List of Senior Secretaries ==
1. Md Mozammel Haque Khan (2011–2011)
2. M.A.N. Siddique (2011–2017)
3. Md. Nazrul Islam (2017–2022)
4. ABM Amin Ullah Nuri (2022–2024)
5. Md. Ehsanul Haque (2024–present)
