= Abdul Mannan (politician, born 1942) =

Bangladeshi politician

- আব্দুল মান্নান
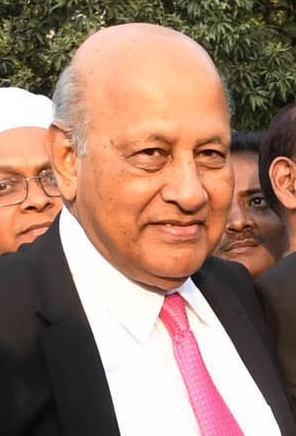
- Mannan in 2019

Member of Parliament
- In office 30 January 2019 – 7 January 2024
- Preceded by: Mohammad Abdullah
- Constituency: Laxmipur-4
- In office 28 October 2001 – March 2004
- Preceded by: HBM Iqbal
- Succeeded by: Mohammad Mosaddak Ali
- Constituency: Dhaka-10
- In office 5 March 1991 – 24 November 1995
- Preceded by: A. S. M. Abdur Rab
- Succeeded by: HBM Iqbal
- Constituency: Dhaka-10

Personal details
- Born: 2 July 1942 (age 84)
- Party: Bikalpa Dhara Bangladesh
- Other political affiliations: Bangladesh Nationalist Party (1991-2004)

Abdul Mannan (born 2 July 1942) is a Bikalpa Dhara Bangladesh politician and former Jatiya Sangsad member representing the Laxmipur-4 constituency. He is the chairman of Sunman Group.

== Career ==
Mannan was elected to parliament from Dhaka-10 as a Bangladesh Nationalist Party (BNP) candidate in 1991. Mannan was re-elected from the same constituency as a BNP candidate in the February 1996 Bangladeshi general election.

Mannan contested the parliamentary election from Dhaka-10 as a Bangladesh Nationalist Party candidate in the June 1996 Bangladeshi general election and lost. He received 63,631 votes.

Mannan was elected to parliament from Dhaka-10 as a Bangladesh Nationalist Party candidate in 2001. He received 94,995 votes.

He resigned from Bangladesh Nationalist Party in 2005 and joined Bikalpa Dhara Bangladesh.

On 15 September 2006, Mannan's rally in Noakhali District was attacked.

Mannan was elected to parliament from Laxmipur-4 as a Bikalpa Dhara Bangladesh candidate on 30 December 2018. He received 183,906 votes. while his nearest rival, ASM Abdur Rob of Jatiya Samajtantrik Dal (Rab), received 40,993 votes.
