= Dhaka-10 =

Constituency of Bangladesh's Jatiya Sangsad

Coordinates: 23.74°N 90.38°E

- Constituency for the Jatiya Sangsad
- District: Dhaka District
- Division: Dhaka Division
- Electorate: 388,660 (2026)

Current constituency
- Created: 1973
- Party: Bangladesh Nationalist Party
- Member: Shaikh Rabiul Alam
- ← 182 Dhaka-9 184 Dhaka-11 →

Dhaka-10 is a constituency represented in the Jatiya Sangsad (National Parliament) of Bangladesh since 2026 by Shaikh Rabiul Alam of the Bangladesh Nationalist Party.

== Boundaries ==
The constituency encompasses Dhaka South City Corporation wards 14 through 18, 22 and 55.

== History ==
The constituency was created for the first general elections in newly independent Bangladesh, held in 1973.

Ahead of the 2008 general election, the Bangladesh Election Commission redrew constituency boundaries to reflect population changes revealed by the 2001 Bangladesh census. The 2008 redistricting altered the boundaries of the constituency.

As of 2008, the constituency encompassed Dhaka City Corporation wards 21 through 23, and four union parishads of Badda Thana: Badda, Beraid, Bhatara, and Satarkul.

Dhaka City Corporation was split into Dhaka North City Corporation and Dhaka South City Corporation in 2011. For the 2014 general election, the constituency encompassed Dhaka South City Corporation wards 14 through 18, and 22.

In 2025, the Election Commission expanded the boundaries of the constituency to include Dhaka South City Corporation ward 55.

== Members of Parliament ==
Election	Member	Party
1973	Khondakar Harun-ur-Rashid	Awami League
1979	Atauddin Khan	Bangladesh Nationalist Party
1986	Sheikh Hasina	Awami League
1988	A. S. M. Abdur Rab	Combined Opposition Party
1991	Abdul Mannan	Bangladesh Nationalist Party
Feb 1996	Abdul Mannan	Bangladesh Nationalist Party
Jun 1996	HBM Iqbal	Awami League
2001	Abdul Mannan	Bangladesh Nationalist Party
2004 by-election	Mohammad Mosaddak Ali	Bangladesh Nationalist Party
2008	AKM Rahmatullah	Awami League
2014	Sheikh Fazle Noor Taposh	Awami League
2020 by-election	Shafiul Islam Mohiuddin	Awami League
2024	Ferdous Ahmed	Awami League
2026	Sheikh Rabiul Alam	Bangladesh Nationalist Party

== Elections ==
=== Elections in the 2020s ===
General Election 2026: Dhaka-10
Party	Candidate	Votes	%	±%
BNP	Shaikh Rabiul Alam	80,436		N/A
Jamaat	Md Jashim Uddin Sarkar	77,136		N/A
Amjanatar Dol	Abdullah Al Hussain			N/A
Labour	Abul Kalam Azad			N/A
JP(E)	Bohni Bepari			N/A
IAB	Md. A. Awal			N/A
Bangladesh Republican Party	Md. Abu Hanif Hridoy			N/A
BSM	Md. Anisur Rahman			N/A
Janotar Dol	Md. Zakir Hossain			N/A
AB Party	Nasrin Sultana			N/A
Majority		3,300		N/A
Turnout				N/A
Registered electors		388,660		
BNP gain from AL				

=== Elections in the 2010s ===
General Election 2018: Dhaka-10
Party	Candidate	Votes	%	±%
AL	Sheikh Fazle Noor Taposh	168,172	53.57	N/A
BNP	Abdul Mannan	43,831	13.97	N/A
IAB	Md A Auwal	4,075	1.30	N/A
Majority		124,341	39.60	N/A
Turnout		216,078	68.86	N/A
Registered electors		313,744		
AL hold				

Sheikh Fazle Noor Taposh was elected unopposed in the 2014 general election after opposition parties withdrew their candidacies in a boycott of the election.

=== Elections in the 2000s ===
General Election 2008: Dhaka-10
Party	Candidate	Votes	%	±%
AL	AKM Rahmatullah	165,549	63.3	
BNP	M. A. Quayum	89,800	34.3	
Independent	Muzammel Hoque	3,154	1.2	
IAB	Abdul Jalil	1,993	0.8	
LDP	Abu Soud	423	0.2	
BKA	Shahidullah Kazi	286	0.1	
KSJL	S. M Ismail	256	0.1	
Jatiya Samajtantrik Dal-JSD	Md. Habibur Rahman	65	0.0	
Majority		75,749	29.0	
Turnout		261,526	74.9	
AL gain from BNP				

Abdul Mannan resigned from parliament in March 2004 to join a new political party, Bikalpa Dhara Bangladesh. Mannan's resignation triggered a July 2004 by-election, in which Mohammad Mosaddak Ali of the BNP was elected.

General Election 2001: Dhaka-10
Party	Candidate	Votes	%	±%
BNP	Abdul Mannan	94,995	54.6	+14.1
AL	HBM Iqbal	73,043	42.0	−5.2
IJOF	Khandokar Abu Motaher	4,451	2.6	N/A
Independent	Stifen P. Mridha	575	0.3	N/A
Independent	Md. Fazlul Haque	399	0.2	N/A
Independent	Tofazzal Hossain Bhuiya	66	0.0	N/A
Independent	Zobayed Hossain Tufan	51	0.0	N/A
Jatiya Party (M)	Md. Abdur Rahman Shikder	50	0.0	N/A
Independent	Md. Anowar Khan	49	0.0	N/A
Independent	Md. Enamul Karim Suja	46	0.0	N/A
BKSMA (Sadeq)	Krishak Md. Sadeq	38	0.0	N/A
Samridhya Bangladesh Andolan	Md. Zakir Hossain	38	0.0	N/A
Independent	Md. Delowar Hossain	37	0.0	N/A
Independent	Sheikh Tawsif Xilani	33	0.0	N/A
Independent	Md. Mostafa Talukder	30	0.0	N/A
Independent	Mohammad Yusuf Haroon	29	0.0	N/A
Independent	Abu Saleh Md. Kibria	24	0.0	N/A
Majority		21,952	12.6	+5.9
Turnout		173,954	56.1	−9.6
BNP gain from AL				

=== Elections in the 1990s ===
General Election June 1996: Dhaka-10
Party	Candidate	Votes	%	±%
AL	HBM Iqbal	74,214	47.2	+9.4
BNP	Abdul Mannan	63,631	40.5	−18.1
JP(E)	Ismail Hossain Bangal	11,114	7.1	N/A
Jamaat	Abdus Salam	4,973	3.2	N/A
IOJ	Md. Waliul Islam	796	0.5	−0.1
Zaker Party	M. A. Khaleq	626	0.4	−0.6
Independent	Md. Ruhul Amin Chowdhury	552	0.4	N/A
Sramik Krishak Samajbadi Dal	Nirmal Sen	394	0.3	N/A
Jatiya Daridra Party	Md. Abdul Aziz Sarkar	150	0.1	N/A
NAP (Bhashani)	Parveen Naser Khan Bhasani	133	0.1	N/A
Independent	Khaled Shamsul Islam	125	0.1	N/A
BKA	Md. Kamruddin	105	0.1	N/A
Independent	Qaiduzzaman Azad	59	0.0	N/A
Independent	Zobayed Hossain Tufan	53	0.0	N/A
Bhasani Front	Mamataz Chowdhury	45	0.0	N/A
Independent	Md. Abdul Khaleq	37	0.0	N/A
Independent	Md. Enamul Karim Suja	31	0.0	N/A
Progotishil Jatiatabadi Dal (Nurul A Moula)	S. M. Ahsan Ali	30	0.0	N/A
Independent	Syad Motahar Hossain	27	0.0	N/A
Majority		10,583	6.7	−14.1
Turnout		157,095	65.7	+17.5
AL gain from BNP				

General Election 1991: Dhaka-10
Party	Candidate	Votes	%	±%
BNP	Abdul Mannan	45,711	58.6	
AL	Sheikh Hasina	29,451	37.8	
Zaker Party	Idrees Hossain Talukdar	816	1.0	
Bangladesh Janata Party	Harun Ar Rashid Mithu	598	0.8	
IOJ	Abdul Based	438	0.6	
JSD	Mir Hossain Akhtar	435	0.6	
Jatiya Samajtantrik Dal-JSD	A. S. M. Abdur Rab	208	0.3	
Bangladesh Inquilab Party	Ruhul Aamin Chowdhury	59	0.1	
Jatiya Janata Party (Asad)	M. D. Rahman	56	0.1	
Bangladesh Muslim League (Kader)	Md. Humayun Kabir	55	0.1	
NDP	Md. Enamul Karim Shuja	52	0.1	
Bangladesh People's League (Garib A Nawaz)	Jobaida Parvin	43	0.1	
Bangladesh National Congress	Shuvash Chandra Debnath	40	0.1	
Jatiyatabadi Gonotantrik Dal	Md. Zakir Hossain	29	0.0	
Majority		16,260	20.8	
Turnout		77,991	48.2	
BNP gain from JSD				
