= Lakshmipur-4 =

Constituency of Bangladesh's Jatiya Sangsad

Coordinates: 22.65°N 90.92°E

- Constituency for the Jatiya Sangsad
- District: Lakshmipur District
- Division: Chittagong Division
- Electorate: 418,160 (2026)

Current constituency
- Created: 1984
- Party: Bangladesh Nationalist Party
- Member: A. B. M. Ashraf Uddin
- ← 276 Lakshmipur-3 278 Chittagong-1 →

Lakshmipur-4 is a constituency represented in the Jatiya Sangsad (National Parliament) of Bangladesh since 2026 by A. B. M. Ashraf Uddin of the Bangladesh Nationalist Party.

== Boundaries ==
The constituency encompasses Kamalnagar Upazila and Ramgati Upazila.

== History ==
The constituency was created in 1984 from a Noakhali constituency when the former Noakhali District was split into three districts: Feni, Noakhali, and Lakshmipur.

== Members of Parliament ==
Election	Member	Party
1986	A. S. M. Abdur Rab	Jatiya Party
1988	Mosharraf Hossain	Combined Opposition
1991	Abdur Rab Chowdhury	Bangladesh Nationalist Party
Feb 1996	Abdur Rab Chowdhury	Bangladesh Nationalist Party
Jun 1996	A. S. M. Abdur Rab	JaSaD (Rab)
2001	A. B. M. Ashraf Uddin	Bangladesh Nationalist Party
2014	Mohammad Abdullah	Awami League
2018	Abdul Mannan	Bikalpa Dhara Bangladesh
2024	Mohammad Abdullah	Awami League
2026	A. B. M. Ashraf Uddin	Bangladesh Nationalist Party

== Elections ==
=== Elections in the 2020s ===
General Election 2026: Lakshmipur-4
Party	Candidate	Votes	%	±%
BNP	A. B. M. Ashraf Uddin	115,199	49.3	N/A
Jamaat	Md Ashrafur Rahman Hafizulla	73,756	31.6	N/A
JSD (Rab)	Tania Rab	22,040	9.4	N/A
IAB	Khaled Saifulla	21,103	9.0	N/A
BSD	Milan Krishna Mondal	440	0.2	N/A
Independent	Nurul Huda Chowdhury	422	0.2	N/A
Independent	ANM Manzoor Morshed	396	0.2	N/A
GOP	Md. Redwan Ullah	259	0.1	N/A
Majority		41,443	17.7	N/A
Turnout		233,615	55.9	N/A
BNP gain from AL				

=== Elections in the 2010s ===
General Election 2014: Lakshmipur-4
Party	Candidate	Votes	%	±%
AL	Mohammad Abdullah	105,585	92.3	+59.6
Independent	Azad Uddin Chowdhury	7,828	6.8	N/A
Independent	AKM Sharif Uddin	776	0.7	N/A
JP(E)	Md. Belal Hossain	234	0.2	N/A
Majority		97,757	85.4	+79.7
Turnout		114,419	42.9	−34.5
AL gain from BNP				

=== Elections in the 2000s ===
General Election 2008: Lakshmipur-4
Party	Candidate	Votes	%	±%
BNP	A. B. M. Ashraf Uddin	68,549	38.3	+2.7
AL	Abdur Rab Chowdhury	58,427	32.7	+2.9
BDB	Abdul Mannan	27,713	15.5	N/A
Jatiya Samajtantrik Dal-JSD	A. S. M. Abdur Rab	21,894	12.2	N/A
IAB	Khalad Shaifullah	1,507	0.8	N/A
BJP	Abdur Razzak Chowdhury	677	0.4	N/A
Majority		10,122	5.7	+3.7
Turnout		178,767	77.4	+23.6
BNP hold				

General Election 2001: Lakshmipur-4
Party	Candidate	Votes	%	±%
BNP	A. B. M. Ashraf Uddin	45,977	35.6	−1.0
JSD	A. S. M. Abdur Rab	43,453	33.7	N/A
AL	Abdur Rab Chowdhury	38,464	29.8	+15.7
Independent	Md. Abul Kalam	407	0.3	N/A
Bangladesh Samajtantrik Dal (Khalekuzzaman)	Abdul Hadi	351	0.3	−0.1
Independent	Azad Uddin Chowdhury	199	0.2	N/A
Jatiya Party (M)	Abdur Razzak Chowdhury	132	0.1	N/A
Majority		2,524	2.0	−0.4
Turnout		128,983	53.8	−7.9
BNP gain from Jatiya Samajtantrik Dal-JSD				

=== Elections in the 1990s ===
General Election June 1996: Lakshmipur-4
Party	Candidate	Votes	%	±%
Jatiya Samajtantrik Dal-JSD	A. S. M. Abdur Rab	37,282	38.9	+6.1
BNP	Abdur Rab Chowdhury	35,031	36.6	+3.5
AL	Abdul Wahed	13,465	14.1	−0.1
Jamaat	Redowan Ullah Shahidi	8,575	9.0	−7.5
IOJ	Mufti Mohammad Idris	577	0.6	N/A
Bangladesh Samajtantrik Dal (Khalekuzzaman)	Abdul Hadi	414	0.4	N/A
Zaker Party	Abdul Matin Faruki	406	0.4	−1.0
Majority		2,251	2.4	+2.1
Turnout		95,750	61.7	+21.2
Jatiya Samajtantrik Dal-JSD gain from BNP				

General Election 1991: Lakshmipur-4
Party	Candidate	Votes	%	±%
BNP	Abdur Rab Chowdhury	25,884	33.1	
Jatiya Samajtantrik Dal-JSD	A. S. M. Abdur Rab	25,631	32.8	
Jamaat	Redowan Ullah Shahidi	12,894	16.5	
AL	M. Sirazul Islam	11,069	14.2	
Zaker Party	Abul Khaer	1,083	1.4	
BML	Md. Zamir Ali	1,067	1.4	
JSD (S)	Abdur Razzak Chowdhury	209	0.3	
BAKSAL	Harunur Rashid	190	0.2	
Independent	A B M Hamid Uddin Ferdaus	189	0.2	
Majority		253	0.3	
Turnout		78,216	40.5	
BNP gain from				
