= Minister of Road Transport and Bridges =

Cabinet position in Bangladesh

People's Republic of Bangladesh Minister of Road Transport and Bridges
- সড়ক পরিবহন ও সেতু মন্ত্রী
- Government Seal of Bangladesh

- Flag of Bangladesh

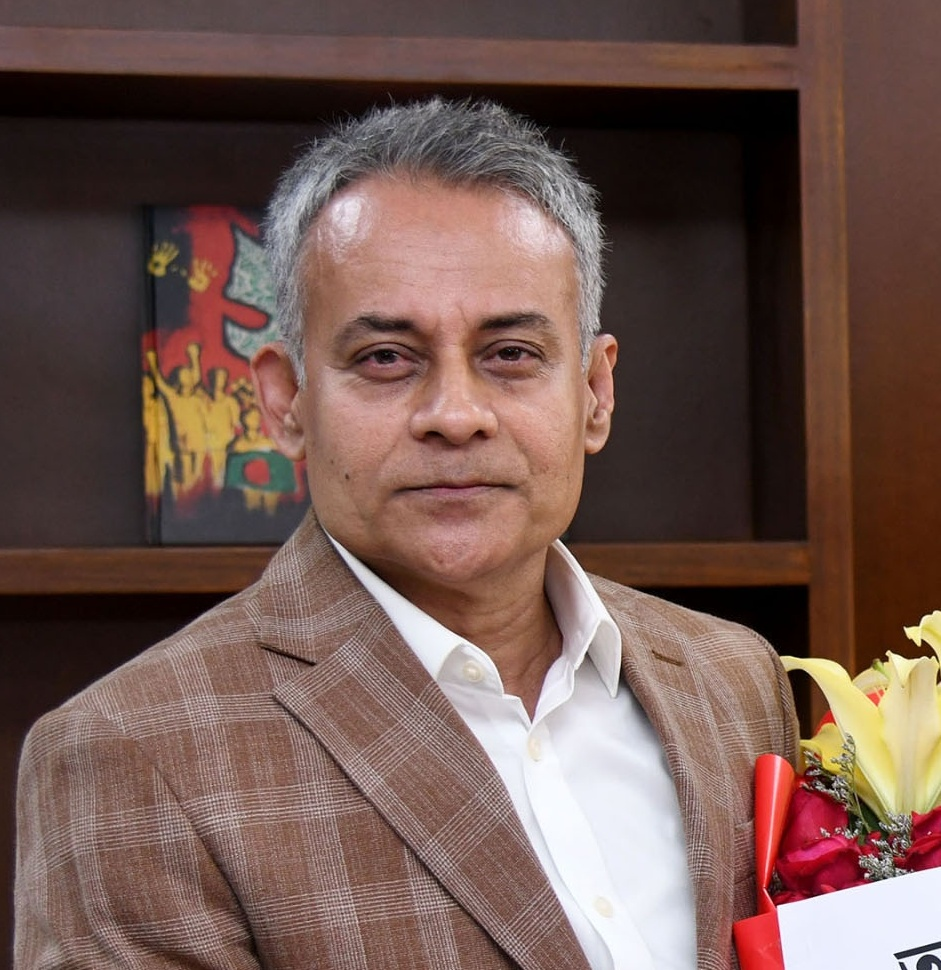
- Incumbent; Shaikh Rabiul Alam since 17 February 2026
- Ministry of Road Transport and Bridges
- Style: The Honourable (formal); His Excellency (diplomatic)
- Type: Cabinet minister
- Status: Minister
- Member of: Cabinet
- Reports to: Prime Minister
- Seat: Bangladesh Secretariat
- Nominator: Prime Minister
- Appointer: President of Bangladesh; on the advice of the Prime Minister
- Term length: Prime Minister's pleasure
- Formation: 14 April 1971; 55 years ago
- First holder: Muhammad Mansur Ali
- Salary: ৳245000 (US$2,000) per month (incl. allowances)
- Website: www.rthd.gov.bd

The Minister of Road Transport and Bridges (formerly the minister of communications) is the minister in charge of the Ministry of Road Transport and Bridges within the government of Bangladesh. He is also the minister of all departments, offices and agencies under the Ministry of Road Transport and Bridges. Although the ministry started its journey as the Ministry of Communications, its name was changed to the Ministry of Road Transport and Bridges on February 10, 2014. Prior to February 10, 2014, the title of the ministers of the ministry was 'Communications Minister'.

== Office holders ==
Listed here are all the ministers, advisors, state ministers and deputy ministers.

| No | Image | Name | Title | Start | End |
|---|---|---|---|---|---|
| 1 | | Muhammad Mansur Ali | Minister | 10 April 1971 | 29 December 1971 |
| 2 | | Sheikh Abdul Aziz | Minister | 29 December 1971 | 12 January 1972 |
| 3 | | Muhammad Mansur Ali | Minister | 13 January 1972 | 15 August 1975 |
| 4 | | M. H. Khan | Minister | 10 November 1975 | 9 December 1977 |
| 5 | | Mashiur Rahman | Minister | 4 July 1978 | 13 March 1979 |
| 6 | | SM Shafiul Azam | Minister | 15 March 1979 | 15 April 1979 |
| 7 | | Abdul Alim | Minister | 15 April 1979 | 11 February 1982 |
| 8 | | Shamsul Huda Chaudhury | Minister | 12 February 1982 | 24 March 1982 |
| 9 | | Mahbub Ali Khan | Minister | 27 March 1982 | 1 June 1984 |
| 10 | | Abu Zafar Obaidullah | Minister | 1 June 1984 | 25 October 1984 |
| 11 | | Sultan Ahmed | Minister | 25 October 1984 | 5 August 1985 |
| 12 | | Moudud Ahmed | Minister | 5 August 1985 | 24 March 1986 |
| 13 | | Sultan Ahmed | Minister | 24 March 1986 | 25 May 1986 |
| 14 | | Moudud Ahmed | Minister | 25 May 1986 | 9 August 1986 |
| 15 | | M.A. Matin | Minister | 9 August 1986 | 30 November 1986 |
| 16 | | M. Matiur Rahman | Minister | 30 November 1986 | 27 March 1988 |
| 17 | | Anwar Hossain Manju | Minister | 27 March 1988 | 6 December 1990 |
| 18 | | Oli Ahmad | Minister | 20 March 1991 | 19 March 1996 |
| 19 | | Abdul Matin Chowdhury | Minister | 19 March 1996 | 30 March 1996 |
| 20 | | Anwar Hossain Manju | Minister | 23 June 1996 | 15 August 2001 |
| 21 | | Nazmul Huda | Minister | 11 October 2001 | 29 October 2006 |
| 22 | | Syed Abul Hossain | Minister | 6 January 2009 | 5 December 2011 |
| 23 | | Obaidul Quader | Minister | 5 December 2011 | 5 August 2024 |
| 24 | | Muhammad Fouzul Kabir Khan | Adviser | 16 August 2024 | 16 February 2026 |
| 25 | | Shaikh Rabiul Alam | Minister | 17 February 2026 | Incumbent |
