= Khondakar Harun-ur-Rashid =

Bangladeshi politician

Member of Bangladesh Parliament
- In office 1973–1979
- Succeeded by: Atauddin Khan

Personal details
- Political party: Bangladesh Awami League

Khondakar Harun-ur-Rashid is a Bangladesh Awami League politician and a former member of parliament for Dhaka-10.

== Career ==
Harun-ur-Rashid was elected to parliament from Dhaka-10 as a Bangladesh Awami League candidate in 1973.
