= British Shipbuilders Research Association =

Shipbuilding research organisation in the UK

- Formation: 1944; 82 years ago
- Legal status: Merged into British Maritime Technology.
- Location: Teddington, London
- Region served: Worldwide

The British Shipbuilders Research Association (BSRA) was a collaborative research organisation focused on advancing ship construction and operation. Founded in 1944, it was amongst the first of its kind in the world.

== History ==
The origins of the British Shipbuilders Research Association (BSRA) can be traced back to the Second World War. While the sector had been able to rely on various trade bodies and non-specific research organisations, such as the British Welding Research Association and the British Iron and Steel Research Association, however, in terms of applied/coordinated research related to production techniques, the industry worked in a highly fragmented manner.

At the start of the war, the UK's shipbuilding industry was quickly brought under direct government control, and efforts were promptly made to reverse the negative effects of protracted low investment in the sector throughout the interwar period and modernise ship construction. The industry had not been proactive in establishing a research association, despite efforts launched in 1917 by the Department of Scientific and Industrial Research (DSIR) to encourage major British industries to do so. During 1942, figures such as the marine engineer Maurice Denny, Charles Galton Darwin of the National Physical Laboratory (NPL) and Cyril Hurcomb of the Ministry of War Transport promoted the concept of shipbuilders undertaking collaborative research to the benefit of the whole shipbuilding industry. By December 1942, agreement in principle to do so was in place; BSRA would be both responsible to the Shipbuilders Research Council, a body populated by the majority of Britain's large shipbuilders, which also primarily financed its activities. Additional funding was also provided by DSIR.

In September 1944, Dr. S.L. Smith was appointed as BSRA's director of research while Dr. J.F.C. Conn was appointed as its chief naval architect. BSRA's activities covered the entire field of shipbuilding alongside various aspects of marine engineering, including marine diesel engines. Denny advocated for practical research efforts, particularly those related to production techniques, to bolster competitiveness against overseas competition and facilitate lower costs of manufacture. In practice, BSRA sought to closely collaborate with other research associations; its experimental activities were typically performed in public laboratories under BSRA supervision, as well as in the test facilities of member companies, the NPL, and various universities. However, when there was special need for particular apparatus, BSRA would occasionally obtain it directly. In September 1945, the SRC approved the first programme of research at BSRA, which concentrated resources into four principal areas: hydrodynamics; ship structures; ship performance, and ship machinery.

By the early 1950s, the organisation was playing a major role in Britain's maritime research, producing an average 23 research reports annually and employing 80 staff by 1953. Increased funding for, and financial supervision of, BSRA were agreed during the 1950s. DSIR funding for BSRA reduced over time, leading to industry provided an increasing percentage of its overall budget. By December 1957, BSRA had issued 227 research reports to members.

During the 1950s, efforts were made to investigate liaison arrangements and collaboration opportunities between BSRA and the Parsons Marine Turbine Research and Development Association (PAMETRADA). In 1962, BSRA merged with some sections of PAMETRADA.

A key early area of BSRA's research was marine diesel and gas turbine propulsion. However, funding cuts during the late 1960s and early 1970s compelled the organisation to terminate or shrink several of its external research contract related to diesel; in March 1968, the test bed, boiler house, research house and turbo-combustion building at the Wallsend Research Station were all reduced to a care-and-maintenance status.

By the 1970s, BSRA was amongst the largest organisations of its type in the world. In 1974, DSIR ceased use of the proportional payments funding model for research associations; instead, BSRA coordinated with the Ship and Marine Technology Requirements Board, which issued contracts in support of specific projects.

During 1969, BSRA formed a computer division, which promptly set about computerising the design process for vessels under the BRITSHIPS initiative. Specifically, it developed programs for performing stability, powering, manoeuvrability and seakeeping analysis. More generally, the organisation was also involved in research in support of the design and production of large tankers, bulk carriers, and container ships.

In 1976, the British government nationalised the shipbuilding industry and created the British Shipbuilders Corporation (BSC); BSRA did not become a constituent part of BSC. However, the declining fortunes of the UK's shipbuilding sector was not a promising environment for the organisation. In 1985, BSRA merged with the National Maritime Institute (NMI) and was privatised as British Maritime Technology.
