= Parsons Marine Turbine Research and Development Association =

Marine engine research organisation in the UK

- Formation: May 1944; 82 years ago
- Legal status: Merged into British Shipbuilders Research Association.
- Region served: Worldwide

The Parsons Marine Turbine Research and Development Association (PAMETRADA) was a collaborative research organisation focused on advancing nautical propulsion systems.

== History ==
The origins of the Parsons Marine Turbine Research and Development Association (PAMETRADA) can be traced back to the Second World War. Prior to the conflict, the sector had been able to rely on various trade bodies and non-specific research organisations, such as the British Welding Research Association and the British Iron and Steel Research Association. In the field of marine turbines, several shipbuilding and marine engine manufacturers were already collaborating with C. A. Parsons and Company, Britain's sole indigenous designer and manufacturer of large marine steam turbines. However, in terms of applied/coordinated research related to production techniques, the industry typically worked in a highly fragmented manner. At the start of the war, the UK's shipbuilding industry was quickly brought under direct government control, and efforts were promptly made to reverse the negative effects of protracted low investment in the sector throughout the interwar period and modernise ship construction. The industry was not proactive in establishing a research association, despite efforts launched in 1917 by the Department of Scientific and Industrial Research (DSIR) to encourage major British industries to do so.

However, by early 1944, following the advocacy of figures such as Charles Craven of Vickers Armstrong and Philip Johnson of Hawthorn Leslie for the establishment of a marine turbine research association, the Admirality also backed the creation of such an institution; it was allegedly dissatisfied with the existing arrangements of the British marine steam turbine engineering sector (much of which were licensees of C. A. Parsons), particularly as there was a perception that domestic productions were at risk of falling behind international competition, particularly in respect to the design and manufacturing techniques that the United States had developed during the war. These calls gave rise to PAMETRADA, which the Admiralty were quick to sign a memorandum of agreement with to direct work towards. Another factor in the association's creation was the shipbuilders being aware of the Admiralty's general dissatisfaction with domestic marine turbine development and fearing that it could start engaging more with land-based turbine producers instead.

Established in May 1944 as a limited company, Dr. Thomas Walter Falconer Brown became responsible for day-to-day running of PAMETRADA in September 1944, while ultimate responsibility for the association fell upon a council chaired by Philip Johnson. While the majority of funding for PAMETRADA was soured from the member companies, additional support was provided from DSIR, as well as the Shipbuilding Conference on numerous occasions throughout the 1950s. By January 1945, PAMETRADA employed a total of nine staff; this expanded to 70 employees in 1947 and 270 by 1952. In August 1946, PAMETRADA’s design team moved into a newly-completed two-storey office block on a thirty acre site at Wallsend, Davy Bank, on Tyneside; this location would develop into the association's primary research station.

Initially, PAMETRADA's activities in design and development of marine steam turbines were prioritised towards blade-path design. While basic design work was performed inhouse by PAMETRADA, detailed design and manufacturing was undertaken by its member companies; furthermore, the association lacked the authority to inspect and supervise production sites, which likely negatively impacted its long-term performance. Nevertheless, PAMETRADA routinely performed shore-based testing of complete sets of turbine machinery, including the gearing, boilers and other associated apparatus.

In addition to its work on steam turbine, PAMETRADA also worked on gas turbines. Being aware of the advances made by land-focused turbine manufacturers, such as Associated Electrical Industries, the association sought to outperform these potential competitors in turbine design. Furthermore, PAMETRADA sought to bolster and harness domestic technical expertise while reducing the industry's dependence on licences from overseas companies. In 1947, English Electric applied to join the association, but were refused due to their lack of marine experience.

PAMETRADA provided the designs for five of the eight Daring class destroyers produced for the Royal Navy; furthermore, it was intended to harness this experience to bolster the development of competitive turbine designs to suit merchant shipping. The association found that the Admiralty increasingly directed its contracts towards the better funded turbine developments of traditionally land-focused companies. In particular, the Admiralty noted that PAMETRADA lacked experience of higher steam conditions, and grew to favour competing designed from English Electric instead.

Furthermore, while PAMETRADA had opted to focus on steam turbines, these were soon superseded either by more fuel efficient diesel engines (that would power many merchant ships) while high speed application, such as warships, increasingly opted for gas turbines instead. PAMETRADA was effectives caught between these two trends.

During the 1950s, efforts were made to investigate liaison arrangements and collaboration opportunities between British Shipbuilders Research Association (BSRA) and PAMETRADA. BSRA's research activities had already included marine diesel and gas turbine propulsion. In 1962, some sections of PAMETRADA were merged with BSRA. While the combined entity continued active research into marine diesel engines in the short times, funding cuts during the late 1960s and early 1970s compelled BSRA to terminate or shrink several of its external research contracts related to propulsion. In March 1968, the test bed, boiler house, research house and turbo-combustion building at the Wallsend Research Station were all reduced to a care-and-maintenance status.
