= A. B. M. Ashraf Uddin =

Bangladeshi politician

A. B. M. Ashraf Uddin Nizan
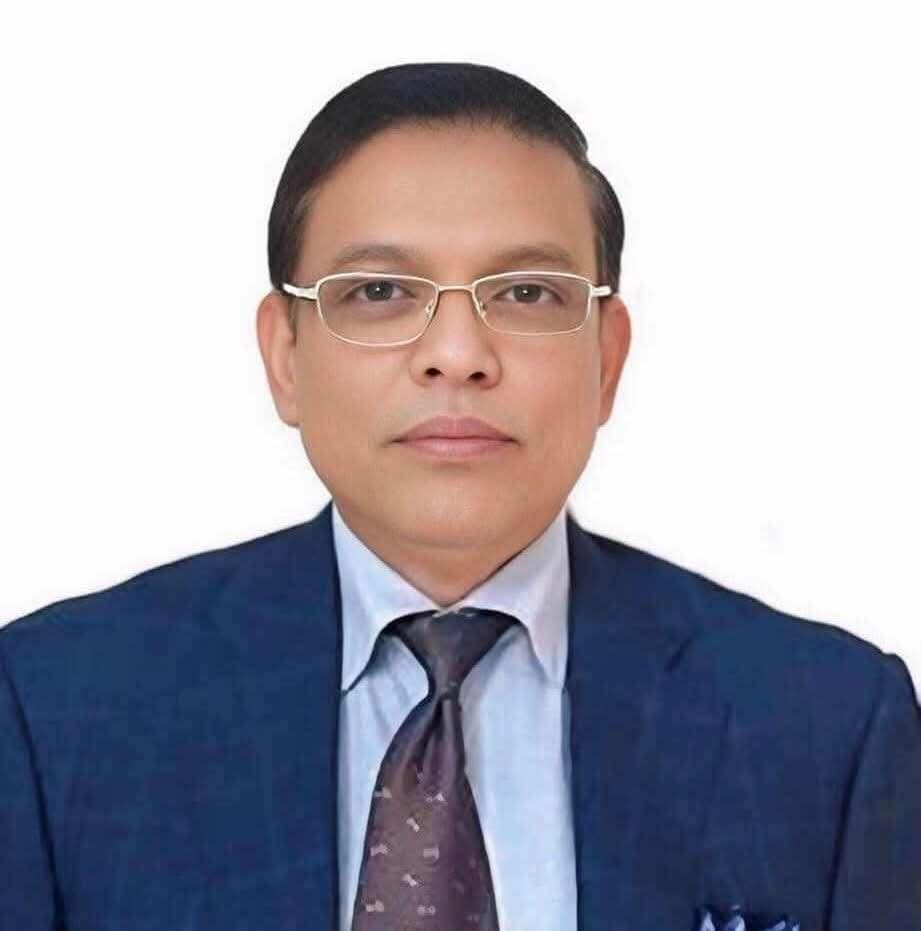

Member of the Bangladesh Parliament for Lakshmipur-4
- Incumbent
- Assumed office 17 February 2026
- Preceded by: Mohammad Abdullah
- In office 10 October 2001 – 12 January 2014
- Preceded by: A. S. M. Abdur Rab
- Succeeded by: Mohammad Abdullah

Personal details
- Born: Lakshmipur
- Party: Bangladesh Nationalist Party

A. B. M. Ashraf Uddin Nizan is a Bangladesh Nationalist Party politician and a member of parliament representing Lakshmipur-4.

== Career ==
Uddin was elected to parliament from Lakshmipur-4 as a Bangladesh Nationalist Party candidate in 2001 and 2008. He chaired the parliamentary standing committee on fisheries and livestock ministry.
