= Ministry of Fisheries and Livestock (Bangladesh) =

Government ministry of Bangladesh

- মৎস্য ও প্রাণিসম্পদ মন্ত্রণালয়
- Government Seal of Bangladesh

Ministry overview
- Formed: 12 January 1972; 54 years ago
- Jurisdiction: Government of Bangladesh
- Headquarters: Bangladesh Secretariat, Dhaka
- Annual budget: ৳2727.51 crore (US$220 million) (2026-2027)
- Minister responsible: Amin ur Rashid Yasin
- Minister of State responsible: Sultan Salauddin Tuku
- Ministry executive: Abu Tahir Muhammad Zaber, Secretary
- Child agencies: Department of Livestock; Bangladesh Fisheries Research Institute; Department of Fisheries; Bangladesh Livestock Research Institute; Bangladesh Fisheries Development Corporation; Marine Fisheries Academy
- Website: www.mofl.gov.bd

The Ministry of Fisheries and Livestock (MOFL, Bengali: মৎস্য ও প্রাণিসম্পদ মন্ত্রণালয়; Maṯsya ō prāṇisampada mantraṇālaẏa) is a ministry of the government of the People's Republic of Bangladesh whose role is ensuring the sustainable utilisation of fisheries and livestock.

== Directorates ==
- Department of Livestock
- Bangladesh Fisheries Research Institute
- Department of Fisheries
- Bangladesh Livestock Research Institute (BLRI)
- Bangladesh Fisheries Development Corporation
- Marine Fisheries Academy
