= Jamuna Bank =

Commercial bank in Bangladesh

Jamuna Bank PLC.
- Type: Public Limited Company
- Traded as: DSE: JAMUNABANK
- Industry: Financial services
- Founded: 2001; 25 years ago
- Headquarters: Dhaka, Bangladesh
- Area served: Bangladesh
- Key people: Robin Razon Sakhawat (Chairman); Mirza Ilias Uddin Ahmed (MD)
- Number of employees: 3,049 (2024)
- Website: www.jamunabankbd.com

Jamuna Bank PLC. is a Bangladeshi commercial bank that provides banking services across the country. Jamuna Bank had 132 branches as of March 2019. Its head office is located in Gulshan-1, Dhaka, Bangladesh.

Jamuna Bank is a third-generation private commercial bank that was established by a group of local entrepreneurs. The bank, aside from conventional services, provides Islamic banking through designated branches. The bank has real-time online banking branches (in both urban and rural areas).

== History ==
Jamuna Bank was established on 3 June 2001. M. A. Khayer was its founding chairman; Sakhawat Abu Khair Mohammad was elected chairman in April 2009; Md Belal Hossain was elected chairman in April 2011; Md Mahmudul Hoque was elected chairman in May 2012.

In 2012, Borak Real Estate sued former chairman Arifur Rahman on a Tk 150 million cheque forgery case. In January 2016, Rahman was sentenced to one year imprisonment which was upheld by the Bangladesh High Court in 2017.

In April 2013, the Anti-Corruption Commission interrogated officials of Jamuna Bank regarding the loan scams of Bismillah Group. The group had used forgery to secure 11 billion BDT from Jamuna Bank, Janata Bank, Premier Bank, Prime Bank, and Shahjalal Islami Bank Limited.

In August 2014, the Bangladesh Supreme Court asked Mozammel Hossain to surrender before a lower court, over two money laundering cases out of 12 filed over the Bismillah Group loan scam. Shaheen Mahmud was elected chairman of Jamuna Bank.

In April 2015, Md Sirajul Islam Varosha was elected chairman of Jamuna Bank; he had previously served as vice-chairman of the bank from 2007 to 2008. In May 2015, the Bangladesh Anti Corruption Commission filed cases against Md Yusuf Hossain (managing director of Raihan Packaging Industries Limited), Md Belal Hossain (Jamuna Bank Shantinagar branch former executive vice president and current principal at Jamuna Bank Training Institute), AKM (Abul Kalam Mohammad) Shah Alam (assistant vice president) and Biplab Kumar Chakrabarty (former first assistant vice president and currently assistant vice president at Jamuna Bank head office). They were charged with embezzling money worth Tk 80 million.

In January 2016, Shafiqul Alam was re-appointed managing director of Jamuna Bank. Gazi Golam Murtoza was elected chairman of Jamuna Bank in May 2016.

In May 2017, Md Ismail Hossain Siraji was elected chairman of Jamuna Bank.

In January 2019, the Bangladesh High Court summoned the managing director of Jamuna Bank, Shafiqul Alam, for failing to return money to a client despite the client getting a verdict from the court in his favor in 2017. This eventually led to the High Court issuing a contempt of court verdict against bank officials, governor of Bangladesh Bank, and the Finance Secretary of Bangladesh. A security guard was found dead inside an ATM booth of Jamuna Bank in Baridhara. Md Atiqur Rahman was elected chairman of Jamuna Bank in April 2019. Mirza Elias Uddin Ahmed was appointed managing director of Jamuna Bank in October.

In 2020 Jamuna Bank has turned into a full-fledged Shariah-based bank. The Anti-Corruption Commission arrested three officials of Jamuna Bank for embezzling Tk 158.6 million in December in Bogura. Fazlur Rahman was elected chairman of Jamuna Bank in May 2020.

In May 2021, Gazi Golam Ashria, the son of Golam Dastagir Gazi, was appointed chairman of Jamuna Bank.

In 2022, Shakib Al Hasan sued Jamuna Bank for using his image without licensing it. In April, Nur Mohammed was elected chairman of Jamuna Bank. In July, Jamuna Bank announced plans to issue Tk five billion in bonds. In November, an inspection by Bangladesh Bank found seven fake notes in the vault of Jamuna Bank's branch in Bogura District. Jamuna Bank received permission from Bangladesh Bank to establish an exchange house in Spain.

== Charity ==
Jamuna Bank donated Tk 15 million to the Prime Minister Sheikh Hasina's relief fund for victims of election-related violence in Bangladesh.
