= Abdur Rab Chowdhury =

Bangladeshi politician

Member of the Bangladesh Parliament for Lakshmipur-4
- In office 1991–1996
- Preceded by: Mosharraf Hossain
- Succeeded by: A. S. M. Abdur Rab

Personal details
- Born: 1933 or 1934
- Died: February 18, 2018 (aged 84) Dhaka, Bangladesh
- Party: Bangladesh Nationalist Party

Abdur Rab Chowdhury was a Bangladesh Nationalist Party politician and member of parliament for Lakshmipur-4.

== Biography ==
Abdur Rab Chowdhury was born in 1933 or 1934 to Fazlur Rahman.

He was first elected as a member of parliament from the Lakshmipur-4 constituency in the 1991 general election as a nominee of the Bangladesh Nationalist Party (BNP). Subsequently, he was re-elected from the same constituency in the February 1996 general election as a BNP nominee.

He moved several private members’ bills while in parliament. According to Nizam Ahmed, a scholar of public administration, the most significant was the Code of Criminal Procedure (Amendment) Bill of 1992. It aimed to curtail the practice of holding accused people on remand and guarantee those who were detained in custody basic necessities like water, food, and a place to sleep. He was unsuccessful at moving a bill to raise the government retirement age from 57 to 60, and another bill to repeal lawmakers' perquisite to import a vehicle free of taxes.

In the 2001 election, after failing to secure nomination from the BNP, he joined the Awami League and contested the election but was defeated. He was also defeated as an Awami League candidate in the 2008 national election.

He was a member of the advisory council of the Awami League.

He died in Dhaka on 18 February 2018, aged 84.
