= Inland Waterway Authority =

Inland Waterway Authority may refers to:

- Bangladesh Inland Water Transport Authority
- Inland Waterways Authority of India
- Inland Waterway Authority (Pakistan)
