= 2019–20 Dhaka Platoon season =

Cricket Club Season

Dhaka Platoon
2019–20 season
- Coach: Mohammad Salahuddin
- Captain: Mashrafe Mortaza
- Ground(s): Sher-e-Bangla National Cricket Stadium, Dhaka
- Most runs: Tamim Iqbal (396)
- Most wickets: Mahedi Hasan (12)
- Most catches: Shadab Khan (5)
- Most wicket-keeping dismissals: Anamul Haque (9)

The Dhaka Platoon (Dhakaiya/Bengali: ঢাকা প্লাটুন), formerly known as the Dhaka Dynamites, is a franchise cricket team that plays in the Bangladesh Premier League (BPL), representing the country's Dhaka Division. Following the 2012 competition, the Platoon are one of the BPL's seven existing members. The team is headquartered at the Sher-e-Bangla Cricket Stadium in Mirpur, and so is one of three teams playing in the city, alongside the Dhaka Division cricket team and Dhaka Metropolis cricket team which are active in first-class cricket.

The 2019–20 season was the 7th season for the Bangladesh Premier League franchise Dhaka Platoon. They were one of the seven teams that competed in the 2019—20 Bangladesh Premier League. The franchise previously qualified for the BPL playoffs in 2015 and 2017 and won the tournament in 2012, 2013 and 2016.

The ownership of the team was acquired by Ahmed Shayan Fazlur Rahman's Beximco Group. The league was later replaced with Bangladesh Premier League, with the ownership of the franchise being awarded to Europa Group under the name of Dhaka Gladiators for US$5.05 million. After multiple corruption charges against the owners, the team was re-acquired by Beximco Group in 2015. Later in 2019 Jamuna Bank acquired the team's sponsorship, with Gazi Golam Murtoza as the team director.

== Squad ==
- Players with international caps are listed in **bold**.
- * denotes a player who is currently unavailable for selection.
- * denotes a player who is unavailable for rest of the season

No.	Name	Nat	Birth date	Batting style	Bowling style	Signed year	Notes
Batsmen
28	**Tamim Iqbal**	(Bangladesh)	20 March 1989 (age 37)	Left-handed	—	2019	
68	**Mominul Haque**	(Bangladesh)	29 September 1991 (age 34)	Left-handed	Slow left-arm orthodox	2019	
29	**Raqibul Hasan**	(Bangladesh)	8 October 1987 (age 38)	Right-handed	Right arm leg break	2019	
45	**Asif Ali**	(Pakistan)	1 October 1991 (age 34)	Right-handed	Right-arm off break	2019	Overseas
19	**Ahmed Shehzad**	(Pakistan)	23 November 1991 (age 34)	Right-handed	Legbreak	2019	Overseas
32	Laurie Evans	(England)	12 October 1987 (age 38)	Right-handed	Right-arm medium-fast	2019	Overseas
All-rounders
55	**Mahedi Hasan**	(Bangladesh)	12 December 1994 (age 31)	Right-handed	Right-arm off break	2019	
51	**Shuvagata Hom**	(Bangladesh)	11 November 1986 (age 39)	Right-handed	Right-arm off break	2018	
71	**Ariful Haque**	(Bangladesh)	18 November 1992 (age 33)	Right-handed	Right-arm medium-fast	2019	
1	**Thisara Perera**	(Sri Lanka)	3 April 1989 (age 37)	Left-handed	Right-arm medium	2019	Overseas
10	**Shahid Afridi**	(Pakistan)	1 February 1980 (age 46)	Right-handed	Right-arm leg break	2019	Overseas
49	**Shadab Khan**	(Pakistan)	4 October 1998 (age 27)	Right-handed	Right-arm leg break	2019	Overseas
45	**Faheem Ashraf**	(Pakistan)	16 January 1994 (age 32)	Left-handed	Right-arm medium-fast	2019	Overseas
21	Luis Reece	(England)	4 August 1990 (age 36)	Left-handed	Left arm medium	2019	Overseas
Wicket-keepers
66	**Anamul Haque**	(Bangladesh)	16 December 1990 (age 35)	Right-handed	—	2019	
44	Jaker Ali	(Bangladesh)	22 February 1998 (age 28)	Right-handed	—	2019	
Bowlers
2	**Mashrafe Mortaza**	(Bangladesh)	5 October 1983 (age 42)	Right-handed	Right-arm medium-fast	2019	Captain
25	**Mohammad Shahid**	(Bangladesh)	1 November 1988 (age 37)	Right-handed	Right-arm medium-fast	2019	
27	**Hasan Mahmud**	(Bangladesh)	12 October 1999 (age 26)	Right-handed	Right arm medium	2019	
47	**Wahab Riaz**	(Pakistan)	28 June 1985 (age 41)	Right-handed	Left-arm fast	2019	Overseas
86	Salauddin Sakil	(Bangladesh)	7 July 1989 (age 37)	Left-handed	Left arm medium	2019	

== Season summary ==
The franchise had signed English ODI captain Eoin Morgan who is the winning captain of ICC Cricket World Cup 2019 and South African explosive batsman David Miller as their two direct signings. For the 2019 edition of the BPL, the Platoon were coached by Mohammad Salahuddin and captained by Mashrafe Mortaza.

Dhaka Platoon started off their 2019–20 Bangladesh Premier League campaign disappointingly by losing in a big margin of 9 wickets in the third match of the tournament against Rajshahi Royals. In their next game, they defeated Cumilla Warriors by 20 runs. Though they didn't start well in that match, having a wicket fallen in the very first ball, they could totally secure 180 runs from 20 overs. This was largely due to Tamim Iqbal's 75 runs off 53 runs and Thisara Perera's smashing 42 runs off just 17 balls. In response, the Warriors were restricted to 160 for 9 as Thisara Perera picked up 5 wickets for 30 runs and named as the Player of the Match.

The first phase of the tournament in Dhaka ended with Platoon's 24 runs win over Sylhet Thunder. Platoon finished their first innings scoring 182 runs losing 4 wickets, with Anamul Haque as the top-scorer, who smashed 62 runs off 42 balls. Batting second, Thunder started to lose wickets regularly as Hasan Mahmud was Platoon's best bowler taking 2 wickets for 24 runs. In their next match, Platoon lost against Chattogram Challengers by 16 runs while chasing 221 making it a high aggregate match.

In the Platoon's fifth game of the season, despite Bhanuka Rajapaksa's unbeaten 95, they clinched a five-wicket victory over Cumilla Warriors. Mahedi Hasan stars in the successful chase as he made 59 runs off 29 balls along with picking up economic 2 wickets for just 9 runs. In their following game, they made their highest successful chase in the season, chasing 175 runs by losing 2 wickets. Relying on Tamim Iqbal's 60 off 49 and Mahedi Hasan's speedy 56 off 28, Platoon comfortably won the match with 9 balls remaining.

The following match, Wahab Riaz’s fiery fifer inspired Platoon to their fifth win in the league and up to third place in the table as they thumped Rajshahi Royals by 74 runs. Asif Ali's smashing 39 runs off just 13 balls in the late overs and Hasan Mahmud's four wicket haul led Platoon to thrillingly win over Khulna Tigers by 12 runs in their next match.

Dhaka Platoon beat Rangpur Rangers by 61 runs in the next match, bowling out the Rangers for just 84 and thus confirmed a playoff berth. In their last two matches of the league stage, Platoon lost against Rangpur Rangers and Khulna Tigers by 11 runs and 8 wickets respectively, although they were qualified to the playoffs.

At the playoffs stage, Dhaka Platoon lost the eliminator against Chattogram Challengers by 7 wickets and thus they were eliminated from the tournament.

== Kit manufacturers and sponsors ==
Shirt Sponsor (Chest)	Shirt Sponsor (Back)	Chest Branding
Jamuna Bank	Jamuna Bank Foundation; Jamuna Bank	Jamuna Bank

== Administration and support stuff ==
Position	Name
Owner	Bangladesh Cricket Board
Team director	(Bangladesh) Gazi Golam Murtoza
Captain	(Bangladesh) Mashrafe Mortaza
Head coach	(Bangladesh) Mohammad Salahuddin
Bowling coach	(Bangladesh) Syed Rasel
Team sponsor	Jamuna Bank

== Season standings ==
Pos	Team	Pld	W	L	NR	Pts	NRR
1	Khulna Tigers (R)	12	8	4	0	16	0.912
2	Rajshahi Royals (C)	12	8	4	0	16	0.420
3	Chattogram Challengers (3)	12	8	4	0	16	0.129
4	Dhaka Platoon (4)	12	7	5	0	14	0.572
5	Cumilla Warriors	12	5	7	0	10	−0.335
6	Rangpur Rangers	12	5	7	0	10	−0.826
7	Sylhet Thunder	12	1	11	0	2	−0.822

- (C) and (R) denotes Champion and Runners-up respectively, (3) and (4) indicates 3rd and 4th position team.
- advanced to the Qualifier 1
- advanced to the Eliminator

== Matches ==
denotes that Dhaka Platoon won the matchdenotes that Dhaka Platoon lost the match
Date	Opponent	Toss	Result	Man of the Match
League Stage
12 December 2019	Rajshahi Royals	Rajshahi Royals elected to field.	Rajshahi Royals won by 9 wickets.	Ravi Bopara
13 December 2019	Cumilla Warriors	Cumilla Warriors elected to field.	Dhaka Platoon won by 20 runs.	Thisara Perera
14 December 2019	Sylhet Thunder	Sylhet Thunder elected to field.	Dhaka Platoon won by 24 runs.	Anamul Haque
18 December 2019	Chattogram Challengers	Dhaka Platoon elected to field.	Chattogram Challengers won by 16 runs.	Mehedi Hasan Rana
23 December 2019	Cumilla Warriors	Dhaka Platoon elected to field	Dhaka Platoon won by 5 wickets.	Mahedi Hasan
24 December 2019	Sylhet Thunder	Sylhet Thunder elected to bat.	Dhaka Platoon won by 8 wickets.	Mahedi Hasan
27 December 2019	Chattogram Challengers	Chattogram Challengers elected to field.	Chattogram Challengers won by 6 wickets.	Imrul Kayes
30 December 2019	Rajshahi Royals	Rajshahi Royals elected to field.	Dhaka Platoon won by 74 runs.	Wahab Riaz
3 January 2020	Khulna Tigers	Khulna Tigers elected to field.	Dhaka Platoon won by 12 runs.	Hasan Mahmud
8 January 2020	Rangpur Rangers	Rangpur Rangers elected to field.	Dhaka Platoon won by 61 runs.	Shadab Khan
10 January 2020	Rangpur Rangers	Dhaka Platoon elected to field.	Rangpur Rangers won by 11 runs.	Lewis Gregory
11 January 2020	Khulna Tigers	Khulna Tigers elected to field.	Khulna Tigers won by 8 wickets.	Najmul Hossain Shanto
Playoffs
13 January 2020	Chattogram Challengers	Chattogram Challengers elected to field.	Chattogram Challengers won by 7 wickets.	Rayad Emrit
Source: ESPNcricinfo

== Statistics ==
=== Most Runs ===
Player	Mat	Inns	Runs	Ave.	SR	HS	100	50	4s	6s
(Bangladesh) Tamim Iqbal	12	12	396	39.60	109.39	74	0	3	36	11
(Bangladesh) Mominul Haque	10	8	297	42.42	122.22	91	0	2	24	7
(Bangladesh) Mahedi Hasan	13	12	253	23.00	136.02	68*	0	3	17	17
(Bangladesh) Anamul Haque	13	13	198	15.23	118.56	62	0	1	22	4
(Sri Lanka) Thisara Perera	10	9	167	27.83	163.72	47	0	0	17	8
Source: ESPNcricinfo , last updated on 4 May 2021

=== Most Wickets ===
Player	Mat	Inns	Overs	Mdns	Runs	Wkts	BBI	Ave.	Econ	4WI	5WI
(Bangladesh) Mahedi Hasan	13	13	40.3	0	274	12	3/13	22.83	6.76	0	0
(Pakistan) Shadab Khan	10	10	34.4	0	240	11	2/14	21.81	6.92	0	0
(Pakistan) Wahab Riaz	7	7	25.4	1	167	10	5/8	16.70	6.50	0	1
Source: ESPNcricinfo , last updated on 4 May 2021

== Awards and achievements ==
Date	Award	Player	Opponent	Result	Contribution
13 December 2019	Man of the Match	Thisara Perera	Cumilla Warriors	Won by 20 runs.	42 (17) and 5/3
14 December 2019	Man of the Match	Anamul Haque	Sylhet Thunder	Won by 24 runs.	62 (42)
23 December 2019	Man of the Match	Mahedi Hasan	Cumilla Warriors	Won by 5 wickets.	2/9 and 59 (29)
24 December 2019	Man of the Match	Mahedi Hasan	Sylhet Thunder	Won by 8 wickets.	1/33 and 56 (28)
30 December 2019	Man of the Match	Wahab Riaz	Rajshahi Royals	Won by 74 runs.	5/8
3 January 2020	Man of the Match	Hasan Mahmud	Khulna Tigers	Won by 12 runs.	4/32
8 January 2020	Man of the Match	Shadab Khan	Rangpur Rangers	Won by 61 runs.	31* (19) and 2/14
