= Royal University of Dhaka =

Bangladeshi University

- রয়েল ইউনিভার্সিটি অব ঢাকা
- Motto: New Horizon in Academic Excellence
- Type: Private
- Established: 2003; 23 years ago
- Founders: Momtaz Begum and HBM Iqbal
- Affiliation: University Grants Commission (Bangladesh)
- Chairman: HBM Iqbal
- Chancellor: President Mohammed Shahabuddin
- Vice-Chancellor: Prof. Dr. Mohammad Rafiqul Islam (D)
- Academic staff: 40
- Administrative staff: 21
- Students: 1300
- Location: 404 Channel 24 Rd, Dhaka, 1208, Bangladesh; 23.76051°N 90.39919°E
- Campus: Urban
- Language: English
- Website: royal.edu.bd

Royal University of Dhaka (RUD) (Bengali: রয়েল ইউনিভার্সিটি অব ঢাকা) is a private university in Dhaka, Bangladesh. The University Grants Commission (UGC) approved the academic programs on 30 July 2003, with a temporary licence, and on 30 August 2003, the Ministry of Education approved RUD under the Private University Act, 1992. RUD started functioning in 2004. Momtaz Begum, a philanthropist and social worker, is the founder chairperson. The permanent campus is situated at 404, Tejgaon, Dhaka 1208.

== List of vice-chancellors ==
- Nurul Alam Khan (Jan 2010 - May 2011)
- Engr. Hasan Imtiaz Chowdhury (Nov 2013 - Apr 2015)
- Profulla Chandra Sarker (Sep 2017 - Jan 2021)
- Subhash Chandra Shil (Feb 2021 - Sep 2023)
- M. Abul Kashem Mozumdar (2023-2024)
- Meshba Kamal (2024)
- ANM Meshquat Uddin (2025)
- Prof. Dr. Mohammad Rafiqul Islam (D)

== Academics ==
Royal University of Dhaka (RUD) is a private institution of higher education offering four-year undergraduate degrees in Bachelor's in Business Administration (BBA), Hotel Management & Tourism (HMT), Economics, English, Computer Science & Information Technology (CSIT), Computer Science and Engineering (CSE), and Education (B.Ed.). Its post-graduate programs are Master of Business Administration (MBA), Master of Science in Computer Science and Engineering (MSCSE), Master of Science in Library Management and Information Science (MSLMIS), and Master of Arts in Education (M.Ed.).

=== Faculty of Science & Engineering ===
- B.Sc. in Computer Science and Engineering (CSE) (day/evening)
- B.Sc. in Computer Science & Information Technology (CSIT) (day/evening)
- M.Sc. in Computer Science and Engineering (CSE)
- M.Sc.in Library Management and Information Science (MSLMIS)

The following major/concentrations are offered at the RUD CSE program:

- Software Designing and Development
- Web Solutions
- Data Communication
- Networking
- Hardware Maintenance
- Information Science
- Data Science
- Artificial Intelligence
- Machine Learning

=== Faculty of Business Administration ===
- BBA (Day/Evening)
- MBA (Day/Evening)
- Executive MBA

The following majors/concentrations are offered at the RUD BBA program:

- Human Resource Management
- Business Economics
- Finance
- Marketing
- Accounting

=== Faculty of Arts & Social Science ===
- BA in English
- Bachelor of Hotel Management & Tourism (BHMT)
- Bachelor of Arts in education (B.Ed.)
- Master of Arts in education (M.Ed.)

The department of English is one of the department of RUD which was established with a view of offering instruction in English at the undergraduate level. The syllabus of BA (Honors) creates a balance between literature and linguistics.
