= Muhammad Fouzul Kabir Khan =

Bangladeshi economist

- মুহাম্মদ ফাওজুল কবির খান
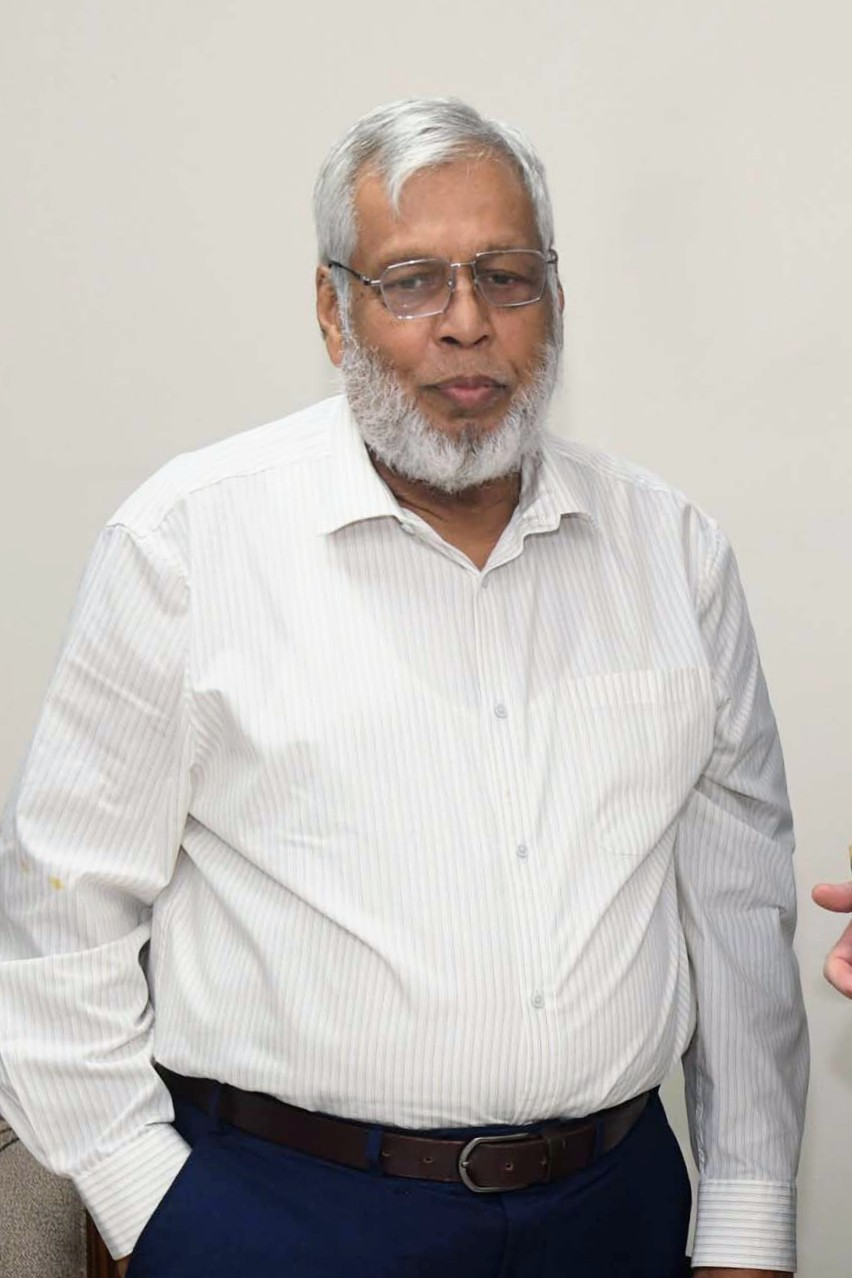
- Kabir in 2024

Adviser for Road Transport and Bridges
- In office 16 August 2024 – 17 February 2026
- President: Mohammed Shahabuddin
- Chief Adviser: Muhammad Yunus
- Preceded by: Obaidul Quader
- Succeeded by: Shaikh Rabiul Alam

Adviser for Railways
- In office 16 August 2024 – 17 February 2026
- President: Mohammed Shahabuddin
- Chief Adviser: Muhammad Yunus
- Preceded by: Md. Zillul Hakim
- Succeeded by: Shaikh Rabiul Alam

Adviser for Power, Energy and Mineral Resources
- In office 16 August 2024 – 17 February 2026
- President: Mohammed Shahabuddin
- Chief Adviser: Muhammad Yunus
- Preceded by: Tawfiq-e-Elahi Chowdhury
- Succeeded by: Iqbal Hassan Mahmood

Personal details
- Born: Sandwip Upazila, Chittagong District, East Pakistan
- Party: Independent
- Spouse: Dilruba Kabir
- Children: Fouzia; Fahmid
- Education: University of Dhaka; Boston University
- Profession: Economist and Civil Servant

Muhammad Fouzul Kabir Khan (Bengali: মুহাম্মদ ফাওজুল কবির খান) is a Bangladeshi economist and retired civil servant. He was an adviser for the Ministry of Road Transport and Bridges, Ministry of Railways, and Ministry of Power, Energy and Mineral Resources of the interim government of Bangladesh from 16 August 2024 to 17 February 2026.

== Early life ==
Khan was born in Harispur Union in the island of Sandwip, under Chittagong District of East Pakistan.

== Education ==
He completed his secondary education from Government Muslim High School in 1968. He completed his Bachelor of Arts in Economics from University of Dhaka in 1976. He earned his Master of Arts in Economic Policy and Doctorate in Economics from Boston University in 1987 and 1989 respectively.

== Career ==
Khan joined the Bangladesh Civil Service in 1979. After finishing his PhD at Boston University, he joined UMASS Boston as faculty before returning to government service at the NBR. Subsequently he was a Professor of the department of Economics at National University of Singapore from 1992 to 1995. Dr. Khan was the first CEO of the Infrastructure Development Company Limited (IDCOL) and served from 1998 to 2007. He served as Secretary of the Power Division of the Ministry of Power, Energy and Mineral Resources from 2007 to 2009 and retired from government service that year.

=== Advisor to the Interim government of Bangladesh ===
Khan served as an advisor to the Interim government of Bangladesh by Muhammad Yunus. He was in charge of 3 ministries.

== Bibliography ==
- বাংলাদেশের সমাজ ও রাজনীতি (Bangladesh's Society and Politics, 2025)
- "বাংলাদেশের রাজনৈতিক অর্থনীতি" (2025)
- Financing Large Projects: Using Project Finance Techniques and Practices (2003)
- Win-How Public Entrepreneurship Can Transform the Developing World (2021)
- Investment Incentives and Tobin's "Q": Experience in the Ready-made Garment Industry in Bangladesh (1989)
