= Bangladesh Marine Fisheries Academy =

Government-run training institution

- বাংলাদেশ মেরিন ফিশারিজ একাডেমি
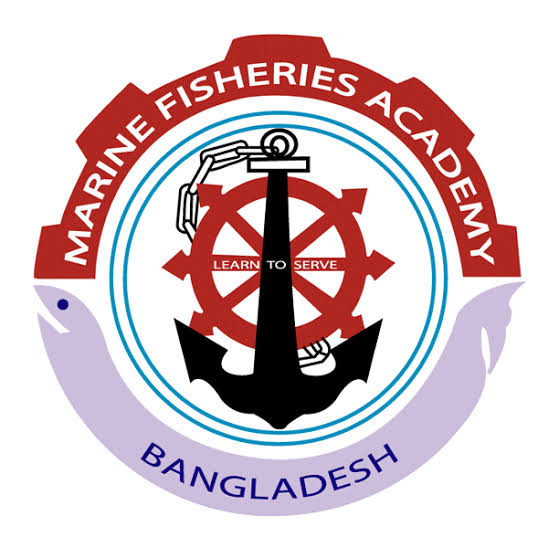
- Other name: BMFA
- Motto: Learn to Serve
- Type: Governmental
- Established: 1973
- Academic affiliations: Bangladesh Maritime University
- Principal: Mohammad Hasan
- Location: Fish Harbour, Ishanagar, Karnaphuli, Chattogram-4000, Bangladesh
- Website: www.mfacademy.gov.bd

Bangladesh Marine Fisheries Academy (BMFA) is a government-run training institution in Bangladesh for cadets wishing to enter mainly the fishing industry, as well as merchant shipping and other related maritime industries. Established in 1973, it is the only national organization offering training for fishing and marine both professions.

Marine Fisheries Academy is affiliated with Bangladesh Maritime University (BMU). Starting from the 39th batch, MFA offered four-year Bachelor of Science (Hons) under three different faculties. The courses are Bachelor of Science (Hons) nautical science, Bachelor of Science (Hons) in marine engineering, and Bachelor of Science (Hons) marine fisheries technology under BSMRMU. The Department of Shipping also issues a Continuous Discharge Certificate (CDC) to cadets of the Nautical Science and Marine Engineering departments.

== History ==
After independence in 1971, there was a shortage of skilled manpower in the fishing industry. At the same time, larger and more technologically sophisticated fishing vessels were being introduced. The government recognized the need for a training institution. To this end, the Bangladesh Fisheries Development Corporation established the Marine Fisheries Academy with the collaboration of the Soviet government. It began operation on 1 September 1973.

In Marine Fisheries Academy, from 2018 (started from 39th batch) they offered three core courses; Bachelor of Science (Hons) Nautical Science, Bachelor of Science (Hons) in marine engineering, and Bachelor of Science (Hons) Marine Fisheries under BSMRMU. Its courses also satisfy the requirement of the International Maritime Organization STCW F and STCW Convention to serve as an officer onboard fishing and merchant vessels. Its passed out cadets are working home and abroad in shore based job such as in marine industries, power plant, LNG & FLNG based project, Safety personnel, processing technologists etc.

== Curriculum ==
The academy previously offered a range of professional bachelor degree courses under Bangladesh National University, Gazipur. These are accredited courses, recognized throughout Bangladesh and elsewhere. Now the academy offers a range of professional bachelor's degree (Hons) four (4) years courses under Bangabandhu Sheikh Mujibur Rahman Maritime University (BSMRMU). These are accredited courses, recognized throughout Bangladesh and elsewhere. The total duration of training of the cadets is four years. Out of that 1st year, 2nd year, 3rd year and 4th year training is conducted in the academy to cover the theoretical aspects of professional and academic subjects. On completion of each year, they attend year final examination conducted by BSMRMU. In the 4th year they undergo practical sea training for 24 weeks on board deep sea fishing vessels and the rest of the 4th year covers industrial training, practice and ancillary courses. On successful completion of these courses they attend final examination under BSMRMU. Thereafter the Marine Fisheries Academy training culminates with the passing out parade and award of graduation certificates.

== Admission ==
Applications are invited from interested male or female citizens of Bangladesh for admission in B.Sc. (Hons) Nautical, B.Sc. (Hons) Marine Engineering and B.Sc. (Hons) Marine Fisheries Courses of Marine Fisheries Academy under the affiliation of BSMRMU. One candidate may apply for any one course or for all three courses. This test is conducted on HSC standard subjects like English, Physics, Chemistry and General Knowledge which are common subjects for both Nautical/ Marine Engineering and Marine Fisheries Groups, Mathematics for Nautical/ Marine Engineering Group and Biology for Marine Fisheries Group. If someone opts for all three Departmental courses then he has to appear all six subjects.

== Course ==
B.Sc. (Hons) in Nautical Science

B.Sc. (Hons) in Marine Engineering

B.Sc. (Hons) Marine Fisheries

== See also ==
- List of maritime colleges
