= Ministry of Railways (Bangladesh) =

Government ministry of Bangladesh

- Bengali: রেলপথ মন্ত্রণালয়
- Government Seal of Bangladesh

Ministry overview
- Formed: 2011; 15 years ago
- Jurisdiction: Government of Bangladesh
- Headquarters: Bangladesh Secretariat, Dhaka
- Annual budget: ৳15694 crore (US$1.3 billion) (2024-2025)
- Minister responsible: Shaikh Rabiul Alam
- Minister of State responsible: Habibur Rashid Habib
- Ministry executives: Md. Fahimul Islam, Secretary
- Website: mor.gov.bd

The Ministry of Railways (MoR; Bengali: রেলপথ মন্ত্রণালয়) is the ministry responsible for the railways and train services in Bangladesh. It was formed in 2011. Previous rail services were part of the now dissolved Ministry of Communication.

== History ==
In the year of 2011, the then Awami League government led by former Prime Minister Sheikh Hasina split up the Ministry of Communication into two parts, namely the Ministry of Road Transport and Bridges and the Ministry of Railways.

In 2016, the ministry proposed a 7.8% hike in the ticket prices of Bangladesh Railways. The announcement faced criticism and demands for reduced corruption in the ministry.

== Bangladesh Railways ==
Bangladesh Railways is the state-owned rail transport agency serving under the Ministry of Railways. It is responsible for the operation and management of the 3,600 kilometres (2,200 mi) long rail network of Bangladesh.

== List of ministers ==
The Ministers in the Ministry of Railways are as follows:

- Suranjit Sengupta (2011–2012) (as Minister)
- Mujibul Haque Mujib (2012–2019) (as Minister)
- Nurul Islam Sujon (2019–2024) (as Minister)
- Zillul Hakim (2024) (as Minister)
- Fouzul Kabir Khan (2024–2026) (as Advisor)
- Shaikh Rabiul Alam (2026–Incumbent) (as Minister)
