= Premier Bank (Bangladesh) =

Bangladeshi commercial bank

The Premier Bank PLC.
- Type: Public Limited Company
- Traded as: DSE: PREMIERBAN
- Industry: Banking
- Founded: 1999
- Headquarters: Shanta Pinnacle (Level-32) 190, Bir Uttam Mir Shawkat Sarak, Tejgaon, Dhaka- 1208, Dhaka, Bangladesh
- Number of locations: 137 Branches, 67 Sub-Branches, 234 Agent Outlets & 136 ATMs
- Area served: Bangladesh
- Key people: Dr. Arifur Rahman (Chairman); Md. Monzur Mofiz, Managing Director
- Services: Retail banking, corporate banking, islamic banking, SME finance, credit cards
- Revenue: ▲ ৳17,660 million (2023)
- Operating income: ▲ ৳9,146 million (2023)
- Total assets: ▲ ৳414,400 million (2023)
- Number of employees: ▲2755 (2024)
- Subsidiaries: Premier Bank Securities Limited
- Website: www.premierbankltd.com

The Premier Bank PLC. is a private commercial bank with its registered office in Banani, Dhaka, Bangladesh.

H. B. M. Iqbal resigned from the post of the chairman on January 12, 2025.

Dr. Arifur Rahman, founding vice-chairman and entrepreneur shareholder of The Premier Bank PLC, was unanimously elected as the new chairman at the bank’s 314th board meeting held on August 21, 2025.

Md. Monzur Mofiz has been appointed Additional Managing Director and has taken charge as Managing Director (Current Charge) from December 14, 2025.

== History ==
The Premier Bank Limited was incorporated on 10 June 1999. Bangladesh Premier league sold its tickets in 2013 from branches of the bank.

In June 2005, Bangladesh Bank fined Premier Bank Limited for failing to comply with Know Your Client (KYC) requirements. Bangladesh Securities and Exchange Commission sued HBM Iqbal for using fake accounts in the stock market. Bangladesh Bank carried out its investigation of the accounts.

Khondker Fazle Rashid was appointed managing director of Premier Bank in October 2007.

In February 2008, M Shah Alam Sarwar was appointed managing director of Premier Bank.

In 2013, Bangladesh Bank launched an investigation into an allegations against Bank's then vice chairman Bazlul Haque Haroon. A client of the bank, Khalilur Rahman, claimed that bank's then vice chairman, BH Haroon, stole Tk 134 crore from his account in 2008 in collusion with some bank officials. Khalilur, got a Tk 203 crore work order for building 15,000 houses in Sidr affected areas in southern Bangladesh in June 2008. The project was funded by the Saudi government. Khalilur opened an account with Bangshal branch of Premier Bank to make transactions for the project. He received Tk 203.06 crore from the Saudi government through seven cheques. Khalilur withdrew Tk 69.11 crore from the account, and kept the remaining Tk 133.95 crore deposited in his account. After primary investigation, The Anti-Corruption Commission has found evidence of embezzlement of Tk 62 crore from the account of a client of Premier Bank's Bangshal branch. Premier Bank sued nine bank officials accusing them of embezzling about 593.4 million BDT from bank along with Bismillah Towels Group.

In 2014 the Bank was fined 2 million Bangladesh taka for money laundering along with seven other banks.

In 2016, money 4 million taka was stolen from ATMs of the bank using cloned Saudi Arabian credit cards.

National Board of Revenue moved to freeze the accounts of Premier Bank in November 2017 over allegations of tax embezzlement.

The Anti-Corruption Commission summoned Bazlul Haque Haroon in 2018, director of Premier Bank, over the 2013 Bangladesh Bank investigation.

In December 2022, Premier Bank announced plans to raise six billion BDT through the sale of bonds.

Premier Bank announced a 10.24 billion year profit in January 2023. Premier Bank donated 40 million BDT to Prime Minister Sheikh Hasina's Ashrayan-2 project.

== Services ==
In April 2019 Premier Bank launches Pmoney app. The pmoney app is a mobile banking app from Premier Bank Limited that offers a range of services, including: Banking, Bills pay, Fund transfers, Mobile top-up, Service request, Beneficiary management, Locate PBL, Information and links and Mail notification.

Premier Bank, Mastercard launch prepaid card for travel agents in September 2023. The card will offer special benefits, including seamless visa fee payments not requiring any endorsement that affects personal travel quotas, no expense limit for single transactions and zero annual fees.

Premier Bank launches 'Premier Bank Quick Account Service' in August 2024. Premier Bank Quick Account is the latest addition to Premier Bank's digital services, enabling users to instantly open a bank account with just a few clicks.

Premier Bank launches 'Premier Bank Green PIN' service in October 2024. This new service allows customers to instantly activate their debit, credit, or pre-paid cards, or generate a new PIN for their cards, via the bank's website or its mobile banking app, Pmoney.

== Board of directors ==
Name	Designation	Reference
Dr. Arifur Rahman	Chairman	
Md. Forkan Hossain	Independent Director & Chairman, Audit Committee	
Syed Faridul Islam	Independent Director & Chairman, Executive Committee	
Md. Sazzad Hossain	Independent Director & Chairman, Risk Management Committee	
Prof. Sheikh Morshed Jahan	Independent Director	
M Nurul Alam	Independent Director	
Md. Monzur Mofiz	Managing Director (CC)	
