= Inland Water Transport Development Company =

Inland Water Transport company in Pakistan

- Company type: Government Initiative
- Industry: Transport
- Headquarters: Rawalpindi, Pakistan
- Area served: Indus River Corridor (From Port Qasim to Nowshera)
- Key people: Mr. Naeem Sarfraz (Initiator)
- Services: Inland navigation
- Owner: Government of Punjab, Pakistan
- Website: iwt.punjab.gov.pk

The Inland Water Transport Development Company (IWTDC) is an initiative launched by the Government of Punjab, Pakistan established in 2014. The primary objective of this company is to establish an inland water transport system spanning the corridor of the Indus River, extending from Port Qasim to Nowshera. It is situated in Rawalpindi. Additionally, operational facilities are in the process of being established at Daudkhel and at three field camps along the River Indus.

== Background ==
The Inland Water Transport Development Company (IWTDC) was established under Section 42 of the Companies Act 2017. The Government of Punjab plays a pivotal role in financing and wholeheartedly backing the company's endeavors to develop and substantiate the advantages of water transport. The endeavor to create a navigation channel stemmed from the collaborative efforts of a group of private sector professionals, with Naeem Sarfraz at the helm. These dedicated efforts spanned numerous years in pursuit of this goal.

== See also ==
- Inland Waterway Authority (Pakistan)
