= Ministry of Road Transport and Bridges =

Government ministry of Bangladesh

- সড়ক পরিবহন ও সেতু মন্ত্রনালয়
- Government Seal of Bangladesh

Ministry overview
- Formed: 10 February 2014; 12 years ago
- Preceding Ministry: Ministry of Communications
- Jurisdiction: Government of Bangladesh
- Headquarters: Bangladesh Secretariat, Dhaka
- Annual budget: ৳36918 crore (US$3.0 billion) (2026-2027)
- Minister responsible: Shaikh Rabiul Alam
- Minister of State responsible: Habibur Rashid Habib
- Ministry executives: Dr. Mohammed Ziaul Haque, Secretary, Road Transport and Highways Division; Md. Abu Bakr Siddique, Secretary, Bridges Division
- Child agencies: Bangladesh Road Transport Authority; Bangladesh Bridge Authority; Bangladesh Road Transport Corporation; Dhaka Transport Coordination Authority; Dhaka Bus Rapid Transit Company Limited; Roads and Highways Department
- Website: www.rthd.gov.bd

The Ministry of Road Transport and Bridges (Bengali: সড়ক পরিবহন ও সেতু মন্ত্রণালয়) is a Bangladeshi government ministry which is the apex body for formulation and administration of the rules, regulations and laws relating to road transport, national highways and bridges. It contains two subsidiary divisions.

Bangladesh has four ministries responsible for transportation within the country. They have specific responsibilities, such as:

- Road safety: Ministry of Road Transport and Bridges
- Civil aviation: Ministry of Civil Aviation and Tourism
- Maritime transport: Ministry of Shipping
- Rail transport: Ministry of Railways

== Organization ==
=== Road Transport and Highways Division ===
- Dhaka Transport Coordination Authority
- Bangladesh Road Transport Authority
- Bangladesh Road Transport Corporation
- Roads and Highways Department
- Dhaka Bus Rapid Transit Company Limited

=== Bridges Division ===
- Bangladesh Bridge Authority

== List of office holders ==
No	Image	Name	Title	Start	End
1		Muhammad Mansur Ali	Minister	10 April 1971	29 December 1971
2		Sheikh Abdul Aziz	Minister	29 December 1971	12 January 1972
3		Muhammad Mansur Ali	Minister	13 January 1972	15 August 1975
4		M. H. Khan	Minister	10 November 1975	9 December 1977
5		Majid-ul-Haq	Minister	9 December 1977	29 June 1978
6		Mashiur Rahman	Minister	4 July 1978	13 March 1979
7		SM Shafiul Azam	Minister	15 March 1979	15 April 1979
8		Abdul Alim	Minister	15 April 1979	11 February 1982
9		Shamsul Huda Chaudhury	Minister	12 February 1982	24 March 1982
10		Mahbub Ali Khan	Minister	27 March 1982	1 June 1984
11		Abu Zafar Obaidullah	Minister	1 June 1984	25 October 1984
12		Sultan Ahmed	Minister	25 October 1984	5 August 1985
13		Moudud Ahmed	Minister	5 August 1985	24 March 1986
14		Sultan Ahmed	Minister	24 March 1986	25 May 1986
15		Moudud Ahmed	Minister	25 May 1986	9 August 1986
16		M.A. Matin	Minister	9 August 1986	30 November 1986
17		M. Matiur Rahman	Minister	30 November 1986	27 March 1988
18		Anwar Hossain Manju	Minister	27 March 1988	6 December 1990
19		Oli Ahmad	Minister	20 March 1991	19 March 1996
20		Abdul Matin Chowdhury	Minister	19 March 1996	30 March 1996
21		Anwar Hossain Manju	Minister	23 June 1996	15 August 2001
22		Nazmul Huda	Minister	11 October 2001	29 October 2006
23		Syed Abul Hossain	Minister	6 January 2009	5 December 2011
24		Obaidul Quader	Minister	5 December 2011	5 August 2024
25		Muhammad Fouzul Kabir Khan	Adviser	16 August 2024	Incumbent

== See also ==
- Minister of Road Transport and Bridges

== Bibliography ==
- Department of Roads and Highways Job Circular 2021 (সড়ক ও জনপদ অধিদপ্তর) (Bangla)
