= HBM Iqbal =

Bangladeshi politician

- এইচ বি এম ইকবাল

Member of the Bangladesh Parliament for Dhaka-10
- In office 14 July 1996 – 13 July 2001
- Preceded by: Abdul Mannan
- Succeeded by: Abdul Mannan

Personal details
- Party: Bangladesh Awami League
- Spouse: Momtaz Begum (died 2022)
- Occupation: Entrepreneur
- Website: drhbmiqbal.com

HBM Iqbal is a Bangladeshi entrepreneur and the founder chairperson of Premier Group of Companies Ltd. He is also a Bangladesh Awami League politician and a former Jatiya Sangsad member representing the Dhaka-10 constituency during 1996–2001.

== Career ==
Iqbal was elected as a Bangladesh Awami League candidate representing the Dhaka-10 constituency in June 1996 and served as the Chairman of Parliamentary Standing Committee at the Ministry of Science and Technology.

On 13 February 2001, shots were fired from Iqbal's rally to the rally of the then opposition party, Bangladesh Nationalist Party (BNP), in the Malibagh area of Dhaka. Photographs of the incident were published in newspapers. Four people in the BNP rally were killed in the shooting. Iqbal, along with 23 others, were charged on 29 December 2002, by the Detective Branch. In August 2010, Speedy Trial Tribunal-1 dropped the case against him, MP Nurunnabi Chowdhury and 12 others after the Ministry of Home Affairs had recommended to drop the charges citing it as a "political harassment case" in 2009.

On 25 June 2007, Iqbal was charged with corruption by the Anti Corruption Commission (ACC). He was sentenced to 13 years in jail on 11 March 2008; 10 years for undeclared assets worth Tk 22.9 crore and 3 years for concealing information on property worth more than Tk 16 crore. His wife, Momtaz Begum, two sons, Moyeen Iqbal and Ikram Iqbal, and a daughter, Naurin Iqbal, were also convicted. HBM Iqbal was sent to jail in February 2010.

The High Court acquitted Iqbal in 2011 but upheld the convictions of his family members. The ACC filed a petition against the acquittal but they dropped their petition in 2015. The family members surrendered at the court in March 2017 and secured bail within a week.

In April 2010, Rajdhani Unnayan Kartripakkha (RAJUK), the public agency for urban development in Dhaka, sent a demolition notice to Momtaz Begum, the wife of Iqbal, for illegally building, Premier Square, a skyscraper in Gulshan area. She had failed to produce documents supporting building's approval despite repeated notices.

On October 12, 2015, Iqbal's underage nephew, Fareez Rahman, crashed his car into 2 rickshaws and injured 4 people. According to policemen on the scene, Fareez had been drinking while driving and was intoxicated. Instead of arresting detaining Fareez, the police were seen taking him away from the scene on a police motorcycle. Later, the High Court ordered the police to arrest Fareez but he was not found in his residence and thought to already have fled the country.

In February 2021, Iqbal sent more than 30 legal notices to bdnews24.com to remove past articles on criminal cases against him. Online articles regarding Iqbal's cases published by The Daily Star now shows the error "You are not authorized to access this page".

As of 2010, Iqbal was a vice-president of the Awami League's Dhaka city unit. He is the founder chairman of Premier Group of Companies Ltd, Premier Bank Limited, Premier Foundation and Premier Bank Foundation.

=== Post-August 2024 ===
After the fall of Sheikh Hasina's government on 5 August 2024, Iqbal and his family fled from Bangladesh. The Anti-Corruption Commission launched an inquiry into Iqbal and his family for acquiring hundreds of crores of taka in illegal wealth. The ACC reported that Iqbal's assets the 5-star Renaissance hotel in Banani and the Royal University of Dhaka were built through illegal sources. Subsequently, the Bangladesh Financial Intelligence Unit froze the accounts of Iqbal, his two wives Anjuman Ara Shilpi & late Momtaz Begum, two sons Moin & Imran, and daughter Nawrin. After the fall of the Awami League government, the Interim Government of Bangladesh reopened the 2001 Malibagh murder case on a petition of former president of BNP's Khilgaon Thana unit and one of the members of the procession upon whom Iqbal fired his pistol at. In November 2024, the High Court of Bangladesh ordered Iqbal, ex-MP from Bhola Nurunnabi Chowdhury Shaon, and 13 others to surrender on the 2001 Malibagh murder case.

== Personal life ==
Iqbal was married to Momtaz Begum (d. 2022). She had served as the vice-chairman of Sheikh Hasina University of Science and Technology Board of Trustees and as the chairperson of the Royal University of Dhaka Board of Trustees.
