= Younus Group of Industries =

- Formation: 1981
- Headquarters: Dhaka, Bangladesh
- Region served: Bangladesh
- Official language: Bengali
- Website: www.younusgroup.com

Younus Group of Industries is a Bangladeshi diversified conglomerate based in Dhaka. Mohammed Yunus is the chairman of the group, Mahfuza Younus is a director, and Mohammed Rashedul Islam is the managing director of the group.

== History ==
Mohammed Yunus established the Younus Group of Industries in 1981 as a cold storage company. It has expanded to include 27 companies. His wife, Mahfuza Younus, served as the group's managing director.

The chairman of Younus Group, Mohammed Younus, was elected chairman of Shahjalal Islami Bank Limited in 2018. He was elected vice-president of the Bangladesh Chamber of Industries in 2023.

Bangladesh Securities and Exchange Commission appointed a special auditor for the assets of Sonali Paper and Board Mills in 2022.

Younus Group subsidiary Sonali Paper & Board Mills Limited reported a 20 percent decline in year-on-year revenue in 2024. It purchased Jago Corporation, founded in 2009, in February 2024. Jago Corporation manufactured water purifiers and was listed on the Dhaka Stock Exchange. Younus Group planned to revive the company, which had stopped production and was delisted from the stock exchange. It also purchased Perfume Chemical Industries Limited, which produced the once-popular Manola branded products from the over-the-counter market.

Bangladesh Securities and Exchange Commission fined the chairman, managing director, and director of the group for manipulating the share price of Paramount Insurance Company Limited.

=== Sonali Paper ===
The group purchased Sonali Paper and Board Mills in 2006.

Shibli Rubayat Ul Islam led Bangladesh Securities and Exchange Commission was accused of providing undue favours to Sonali Paper and Board Mills Limited by providing them with 18 exemptions to the stock exchange rules. Sonali paper also diversified into producing Aluminum foil during the COVID-19 pandemic. Sonali Paper was accused of hiding financial information from stockholders by not publishing financial statements.

== Businesses ==
- Ananta Paper Mills Limited
- Younus Newsprint Mills Limited
- Younus Offset Paper Mills Limited
- Younus Fine Paper Mills Limited
- Younus paper Mills Limited
- Sonali Paper and Board Mills Limited
- Younus Spinning Mills Limited
- Sobhan Ice and Cold Storage Limited
- Acko industries and cold storage Limited
- Younus Cold Storage Limited
- Younus Specialized Cold Storage Limited
- Bikrampur Potato Flakes Industries Limited
- Europa Cold Storage Limited
- Nowpara Cold Storage Limited
- Siddeshawari Cold Storage Limited
- Five Star Ice & Cold Storage Limited
- Wadud & Ayesha Cold Storage Limited
- Sharif Cold Storage Limited
- Sreenagar Cold Storage Limited
- A. Kader & Son’s Himager Limited
- YSR Logistics Limited
- Sonali Abason Limited
- Sonali IT
- Sonali News
- Sonali Bazar
- Sonali Tissue Industries Limited
