= BMT Group =

International multidisciplinary engineering, science and technology consultancy

BMT Group Limited, formerly British Maritime Technology, was established in 1985 as an international multidisciplinary engineering, science and technology consultancy offering services particularly in the defence and security, critical infrastructure, commercial shipping, and environment sectors. The company's heritage dates to World War II. BMT's head office is in London, England.

BMT specialises in maritime engineering design, design support, risk and contract management. BMT provides services focused by geography, technology and/or market sector. It employs around 1,500 professionals operating from 47 offices across four continents, with primary bases in South America, Australia, Europe, North America and Asia-Pacific.

== History ==
Originally formed in 1985 from the merger and privatisation of the British Shipbuilders Research Association (BSRA) and the National Maritime Institute (NMI), it enjoyed tax-free status as a scientific research association for more than a decade.

BMT's heritage includes the water tanks where the famous Bouncing Bomb, used in the Dambusters Raid, was developed during World War II, as well as more recent advances in computer-aided design and aerodynamics.

== Employee ownership ==
BMT Group Limited is a company limited by guarantee with its assets held in an Employee Benefit Trust. The remit of the EBT is to ensure the long-term sustainability of the group with the employees as beneficiaries. The EBT trustees are chaired by Wendy Barnes and include other non-executive directors from the board of BMT and a wholly independent external trustee.

== Notable defence projects ==
=== Queen Elizabeth-class aircraft carrier design ===
BMT gained prominence in 2003 when the Secretary of State for Defence revealed the crucial design role of BMT Defence Services in the Future Aircraft Carriers programme. The company provided much of the design expertise within the Thales CVF Team, whose design was taken forward into the alliance with BAE Systems to create what is now the Royal Navy’s Queen Elizabeth-class aircraft carrier.

=== Other naval projects ===
Another project is the conversion of the Ministry of Defence Longbow trials platform to perform sea trials on the PAAMS missile system to be fitted to the UK's Type 45 destroyers.

The firm is a member of Team 31, the winning team selected to design and build the UK’s new Type 31 frigate for the Royal Navy, alongside Babcock, Thales and Odense Maritime Technology.

The United States Navy’s high-speed Sea Fighter (FSF-1) “X-Craft” catamaran is also a BMT design.

BMT are the world’s leading independent experts in submarine design and development and have contributed to over 70 EU research projects. It has proposed designs for diesel-electric submarines including the Wyvern, VIDAR-36 and the VIDAR-7

In August 2026, One2Three Naval Architects was purchased.

==== Creating HMAS Choules ====
In early 2011, the Royal Australian Navy (RAN) purchased the RFA Largs Bay from the Royal Fleet Auxiliary (RFA) in order to help support its operations around the world. After extensive sea trials to confirm the condition of the vessel and a major refit to make her suitable for RAN services, she was commissioned as HMAS Choules in December 2011.

As a 16,000-tonne amphibious Landing Ship Dock capable of carrying over 300 troops, 23 Abrams tanks, 150 light trucks, landing craft and capable of operating Navy helicopters, it expanded the RAN fleet’s formidable capability to get landing forces and equipment ashore. However, a number of the warship’s onboard systems were still retained in the RFA configuration, so the Navy undertook a three-year project to carry out the necessary engineering changes that would bring the ship fully into line with Australian Navy requirements.

Taking advantage of BMT's maritime defence and engineering expertise, the vessel’s in-service support contractor A&P Group appointed them as in-house design support. This represented the first time that BMT had had such a close and involved relationship with an International Ship Security Certificate and it was a major escalation in their ability to undertake engineering services on an in-service vessel.

BMT's in-house engineering team provided a wide range of essential engineering services and were embedded in the project in order to provide a response and easy access to the vessel and relevant Government Furnished Equipment (GFX).

== Non-defence projects ==
=== Offshore energy infrastrucuture ===
BMT is an established designer of Crew Transfer Vessels for the offshore wind power sector, with vessels deployed in the North American, Japanese and Taiwanese markets. In February 2024 it unveiled its first Service Operation Vessel (SOV) design, capable of being powered by methanol (potentially the efuel variant).

BMT is involved earth observation for maritime markets, having been selected in February 2021 by the European Space Agency as part of the development team to assess the feasibility of applying space-based data to support the decommissioning of offshore energy assets, including oil and gas platforms and offshore wind farms.

=== Maritime disaster surveying ===
BMT has also helped to assess the damage caused by major maritime disasters, from the Piper Alpha platform and the Herald of Free Enterprise in 1987, to the Sea Empress oil spill and the effects of Hurricane Katrina.

=== Commercial naval architecture ===
==== Creating RSV Nuyina ====
RSV Nuyina is Australia's newest icebreaking research and supply vessel (RSV), intended to support Australian bases on Antarctica. Capable of deploying helicopters, landing barges and amphibious trucks to support resupply operations, and with a large moon pool for launching and retrieving sampling equipment and remotely operated vehicles, it provides a platform for marine science research in both sea ice and open water.

Named after the southern lights in the palawa kani language of the Tasmanian Aborigines, it made its first voyage to Antarctica for the 2020-21 summer season, where it acted as the main lifeline for Australia’s Antarctic and sub-Antarctic research stations and the central platform of Australia's Antarctic and Southern Ocean (ASO) scientific research.

RSV Nuyina represented an important and significant expansion of Australia's ASO capabilities, with the government investing nearly AU$2 billion to cover the design, build and 30-year operational and maintenance lifespan of the vessel - the single biggest investment in the history of Australian Antarctic Program.

The prime contractors for the project engaged BMT to ensure that milestones and capability were delivered on time through design, build and transition into service phases. From key maintenance engineering advice to programmatic and systems engineering requirements, BMT used their embedded resources and local and international capabilities to the build and transition into service of this complex sea platform that presented numerous requirements.

=== Architectural testing ===
It has conducted airflow wind tunnel testing of major landmarks and tall buildings, including the Bird's Nest Olympic Stadium in Beijing, the Stonecutters Bridge in Hong Kong; and the 21st Century Tower and Burj al-Arab in Dubai.
