= Shaikh Rabiul Alam =

Bangladeshi politician (born 1971)

- শেখ রবিউল আলম
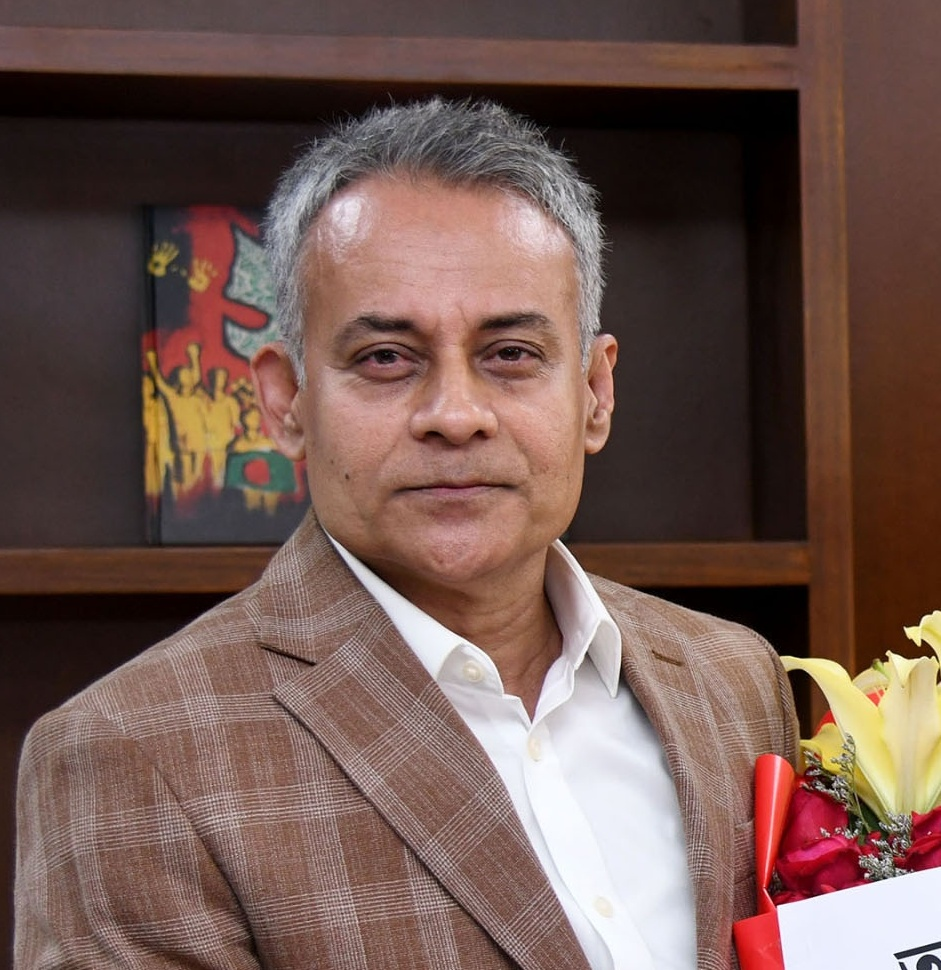
- Alam in 2026

Minister of Road Transport and Bridges
- Incumbent
- Assumed office 17 February 2026
- Prime Minister: Tarique Rahman
- Preceded by: Muhammad Fouzul Kabir Khan

Minister of Railways
- Incumbent
- Assumed office 17 February 2026
- Prime Minister: Tarique Rahman
- Preceded by: Muhammad Fouzul Kabir Khan

Minister of Shipping
- Incumbent
- Assumed office 17 February 2026
- Prime Minister: Tarique Rahman
- Preceded by: M. Sakhawat Hussain

Member of the Bangladesh Parliament for Dhaka-10
- Incumbent
- Assumed office 17 February 2026
- Preceded by: Ferdous Ahmed

Personal details
- Born: 6 October 1971 (age 55) Bagerhat, Bangladesh
- Party: Bangladesh Nationalist Party
- Occupation: Businessman, politician

Shaikh Rabiul Alam (Bengali: শেখ রাবিউল আলম) is a Bangladesh Nationalist Party politician and a member of Jatiya Sangsad representing the Dhaka-10 constituency. He currently serves as the minister of road transport and bridges, railways, and shipping.

== Background ==
Sheikh Rabiul Alam was born to Sheikh Lokman Hakim and Asia Begum.

== Career ==
Alam is the managing director of Pleasant Properties Limited, a real estate company.

Alam was the BNP candidate for the Dhaka-10 constituency in the 2018 Bangladeshi general election but lost to the Awami League candidate Sheikh Fazle Noor Taposh.

Alam became an executive committee member member of Bangladesh Nationalist Party (BNP).

On 15 October 2024, BNP suspended Alam following his alleged involvement in a murder case.

On 4 December 2025, BNP nominated Alam as its candidate for the Dhaka-10 constituency for the 2026 Bangladeshi general election held on 12 February 2026. He won the election, securing 80,436 votes.

== Controversies ==
=== Alleged involvement in murder ===
In October 2024, Sheikh Robiul Alam was accused of involvement in the killing of Deepto TV broadcast engineer Tanjil Jahan Islam Tamim during a dispute over apartment ownership at the Mahanagar Project in Rampura, Dhaka. Tamim was fatally beaten on 10 October 2024 during a confrontation reportedly involving employees of Pleasant Properties Limited, a real estate developer owned by Alam. Tamim's father subsequently filed a murder case naming 16 suspects, including Alam being one of the prime suspects. According to police, preliminary investigations indicated his possible involvement in the incident, and law enforcement agencies launched a manhunt then to arrest him, but Alam went into hiding.

=== Comment on extortion ===
In February 2026, Alam drew criticism for defending so-called transport "levies" collected on roads as consensual and not extortion, a stance that sparked backlash. He later explained his claim at a press conference, where he reiterated the same claim.
