= Atauddin Khan =

Bangladeshi politician

Member of Bangladesh Parliament

Personal details
- Died: 1 December 2015; Dhaka, Bangladesh
- Political party: Bangladesh Nationalist Party

Atauddin Khan (died 1 December 2015) was a Bangladesh Nationalist Party politician and a former member of parliament for Dhaka-10.

== Career ==
Khan was elected to parliament from Dhaka-10 as a Bangladesh Nationalist Party candidate in 1979. He was previously elected to the Parliament of Pakistan in 1965 as a Muslim League candidate. He served as the state minister of finance in the cabinet of President Ziaur Rahman. In 1980, he joined Janata Dal, founded by KM Obaidur Rahman. He served as the state minister of labor and social welfare. He was arrested by General Hussain Mohammad Ershad, who had launched a coup.

== Death ==
Khan died on 1 December 2015. He was buried in Nawabganj, Dhaka.
