= Inland Waterway Authority (Pakistan) =

Proposed Government agency of Pakistan

Inland Waterway Authority (IWA)
- Formation: Proposed
- Type: Federal-level entity
- Purpose: Regulating and standardizing inland waterways transportation (IWT) through legislative measures
- Region served: Pakistan

The Inland Waterway Authority (IWA) is a proposed federal-level entity in Pakistan, with the goal of regulating and standardizing inland waterways transportation (IWT) through legislative measures. The World Bank has been providing guidance and advice to Pakistan on the enhancement and development of its inland waterways since as early as 1961.

== History ==
The World Bank has been offering guidance to Pakistan regarding the development of its inland waterways since as early as 1961. However, despite decades of recommendations and discussions, Pakistan has not fully capitalized on the substantial economic advantages offered by maritime and inland waterway transportation.

In 2017, former Prime Minister Nawaz Sharif embraced a proposal for establishing a ferry service connecting Karachi, Gwadar, and Muscat. Following this, the Ministry of Maritime Affairs put forth a plan to create a ferry service that would link Karachi, Port Qasim, and Gwadar with various ports in Iran, Iraq, Oman, and the UAE.

Pakistan holds significant potential for establishing a robust ferry or ship liner service by leveraging its expansive river system, extensive coastline, and canal network. Spanning roughly 2,000 kilometers, Pakistan's coastline, coupled with its five major rivers—Indus, Jhelum, Chenab, Ravi, and Sutlej—provides a natural transportation infrastructure well-suited for the efficient and environmentally sustainable movement of both people and commodities.

The advancement of Inland Water Transportation (IWT) holds significant socio-economic viability and is poised to generate substantial economic benefits for the nation. IWT can play a pivotal role in flood control efforts, reduce logistical expenses for both shippers and consumers, lower carbon emissions, and alleviate the strain on road infrastructure.

== See also ==
- East Pakistan Inland Water Transport Authority
- Inland Water Transport Development Company
