= Mohammad Abdullah (politician) =

Bangladeshi politician

- মোঃ আবদুল্লাহ
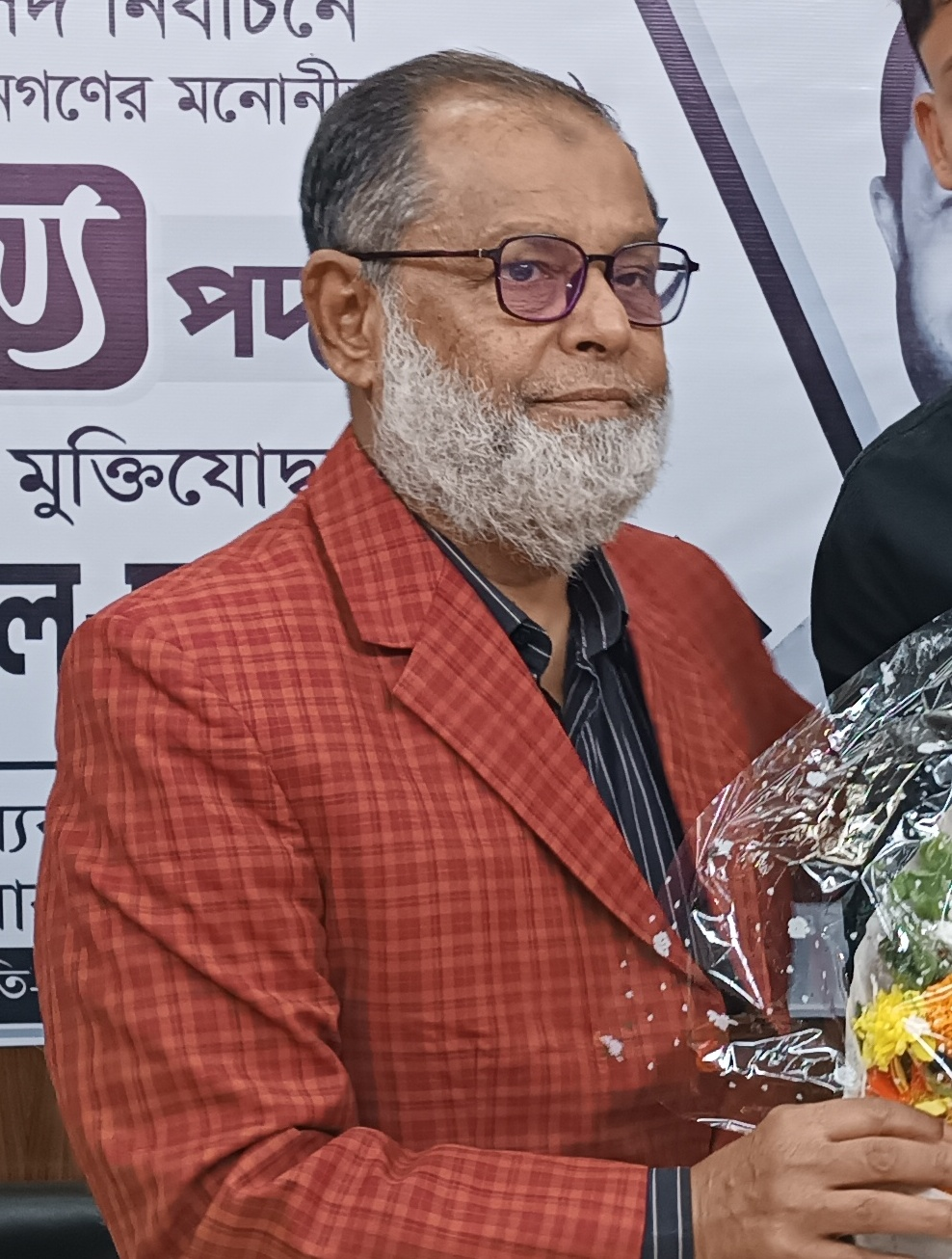

Member of the Bangladesh Parliament for Lakshmipur-4
- In office 30 January 2024 – 6 August 2024
- Preceded by: Abdul Mannan

Personal details
- Born: 7 August 1956 (age 69) Lakshmipur, East Pakistan, Pakistan
- Party: Independent (Shotontro)
- Spouse: Mahmuda Begum

Mohammad Abdullah Al-Mamun is a politician and former Jatiya Sangsad member representing the Lakshmipur-4 constituency.

== Career ==
Abdullah was elected to Parliament from Laxmipur-4 on 5 January 2014 as a Bangladesh Awami League candidate. He was elected Member of Parliament for the second time in the 12th National Parliament election held on 7 January 2024.
