= Mosharraf Hossain (Lakshmipur politician) =

Bangladeshi politician (1947/1948–2026)

- মোশাররফ হোসেন

Member of Bangladesh Parliament
- In office 1988–1990

Personal details
- Born: 1947 or 1948
- Died: 21 June 2026 (aged 78) Dhaka, Bangladesh
- Party: Jatiya Party (Ershad)

Mosharraf Hossain (Bengali: মোশাররফ হোসেন; 1947 or 1948 – 21 June 2026) was a Bangladeshi Jatiya Party (Ershad) politician who was a member of parliament for Laxmipur-4.

== Career ==
Hossain was elected to parliament from Laxmipur-4 as a Jatiya Party candidate in 1988.

== Death ==
Hossain died in Dhaka on 21 June 2026, at the age of 78.
