= Bismillah Group =

Bangladeshi company

- Headquarters: Dhaka, Bangladesh
- Region served: Bangladesh
- Official language: Bengali
- Website: Bismillah Group

Bismillah Group is terry towel producer and exporter that embezzled 9.9 billion Taka from five separate banks and is located in Dhaka, Bangladesh. As of 2015 the banks are yet to recovery any of the stolen funds.

== History ==
Bismillah group allegedly embezzled 5.27 billion Taka from Janata Bank. They embezzled 3.26 billion Taka from Prime Bank Limited, 1.54 billion Taka from Jamuna Bank. They further took 1.04 billion Taka from Shahjalal Islami Bank Limited and 625.3m taka from Premier Bank. This was done over the course of three years. They were aided by insiders in the banks. They made fake sales contract through their companies outside of Bangladesh. Then open letter of credit for phantom exports. The group Chairperson Nawrin Hasib and Managing Director Khaza Suleiman Chowdhury were charged in 12 cases by the Bangladesh Anti Corruption Commission. The commission also sued 53 bank officials from the 5 bank. In 2018, Managing Director Khaza Solaiman Anwar Chowdhury, Chairman Nowrin Hasib, Shafiqul Anwar Chowdhury, Akbar Aziz Muttaki, Abul Hossain Chowdhury, Riaz Uddin Ahmed, M Akhter Hossain, SM Soaib-Ul- Kabir, and Mostak Ahmed Khan were awarded with 10 years imprisonment and a fine of Tk 30 crore 67 lakh.

== Subsidiaries ==
- Bismillah Towels Ltd
- Hindul Wali Textile Ltd
- Alpha Composite Towels Ltd
- Network Freight System
