= A. S. M. Abdur Rab =

Bangladeshi politician

- আ. স. ম. আবদুর রব
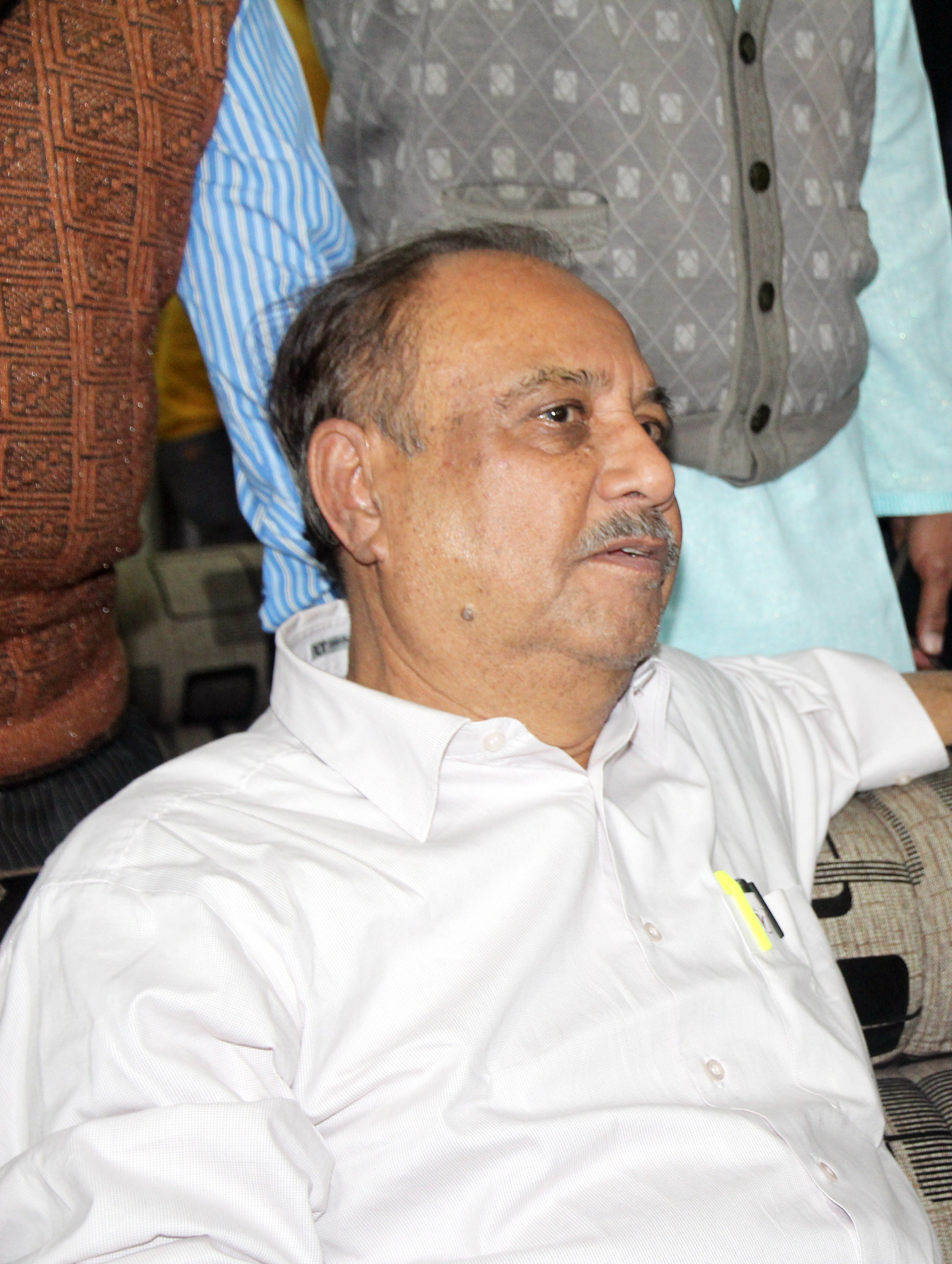
- Abdur Rab in January 2019

3rd Leader of the Opposition
- In office 3 March 1988 – 27 February 1991
- President: Hussain Muhammad Ershad; Shahabuddin Ahmed
- Prime Minister: Moudud Ahmed; Kazi Zafar Ahmed
- Preceded by: Sheikh Hasina
- Succeeded by: Sheikh Hasina

Minister of Shipping
- In office 29 June 1996 – 24 December 1998
- Prime Minister: Khaleda Zia
- Preceded by: Sheikh Hasina
- Succeeded by: Syed Manzur Elahi

Ministry of Fisheries and Livestock
- In office 25 December 1998 – 13 June 2001
- Prime Minister: Sheikh Hasina
- Preceded by: Qazi Fazlur Rahman (acting); Satish Chandra Roy
- Succeeded by: Sadeque Hossain Khoka

Member of the Bangladesh Parliament for Lakshmipur-4
- In office 1996–2001
- Preceded by: Abdur Rab Chowdhury
- Succeeded by: A. B. M. Ashraf Uddin

Personal details
- Born: 2 January 1945 (age 81) Noakhali, East Bengal, British India
- Party: Jatiya Samajtantrik Dal-JSD
- Occupation: politician

A. S. M. Abdur Rab (born 2 January 1945) is a Bangladeshi politician. He is the founder secretary general of the Jatiya Samajtantrik Dal. In 1985, Abdur Rab and his followers left the party and formed a new party, Jatiya Samajtantrik Dal-JSD, known as JSD (Rab). He served as the Jatiya Sangsad member from Lakshmipur-4 and the minister of shipping and later the minister of fisheries and livestock during 1996-2001 of the first Hasina ministry.

== Early life ==
Abdur Rab was born on 2 January 1945. He was general secretary of the student political organization East Pakistan Chhatra League from 1969 to 1970. He was the leader of the 1969 East Pakistan mass uprising. He was the first person to hoist the flag of Bangladesh on 2 March 1971 as the vice president of Dhaka University Central Students' Union.

== Career ==
He is one of the organizers of the liberation struggle of Bangladesh. Under the leadership of Chhatra League leaders Noor Alam Siddiqui, Abdul Kuddus, A S M Abdur Rab and Shajahan Siraj, the flag of independent Bangladesh was hoisted at Dhaka University on 2 March 1971. A flag of independent Bangladesh was first inaugurated by A.S.M. Abdur Rab. In the historic Bot-tala of Dhaka University, A S M Abdur Rab handed over the flag of Bangladesh to Sheikh Mujibur Rahman. After the independence of Bangladesh, Rab formed the left-wing Jatiya Samajtantrik Dal. He, along with Serajul Alam Khan and Shajahan Siraj, took a stand against the government led by Sheikh Mujibur Rahman. He led the rally on 17 March 1974 towards the residence of Home Minister Muhammad Mansur Ali at Ramna amid Jatiya Rakkhi Bahini led firing upon the crowd. Abdur Rab is a survivor of the 1974 Ramna massacre. President Abu Sadat Mohammad Sayem released M. A. Jalil and Abdur Rab after taking power because of the involvement of the Jatiya Samajtantrik Dal in the Sipahi–Janata Revolution.

Abdur Rab became the leader of the opposition in 1988 and also served as a minister of Sheikh Hasina's cabinet from 1996 to 2001 as the minister of shipping and later the minister of fisheries and livestock.
