= Shahjalal Islami Bank =

Sharia compliant bank in Bangladesh

Shahjalal Islami Bank PLC.
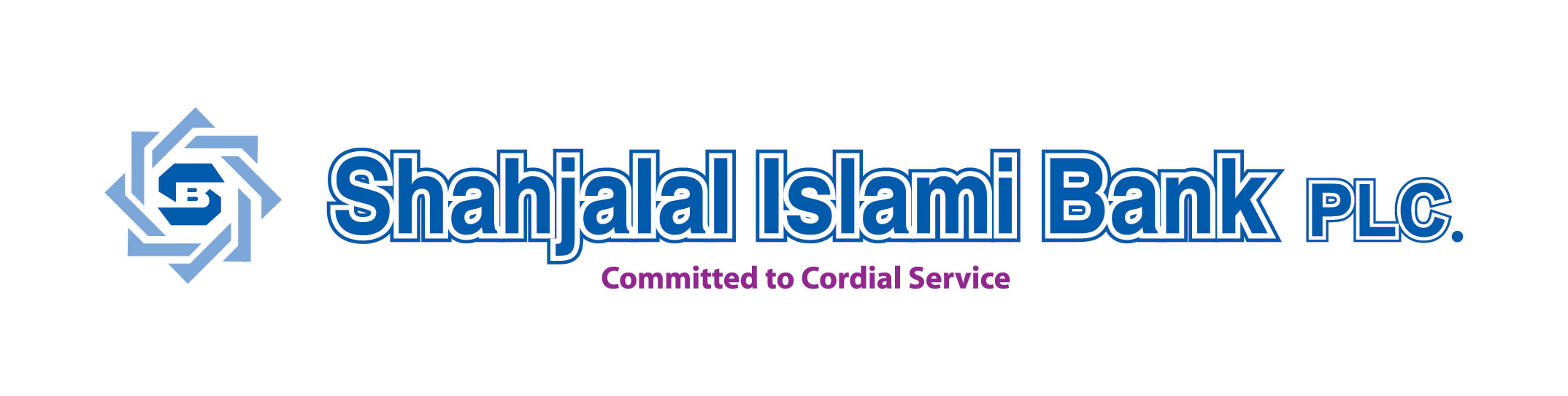
- Company type: Public limited company
- Industry: Banking
- Founded: Dhaka, Bangladesh
- Products: Banking services Consumer Banking; Corporate Banking; Investment Banking
- Net income: ▲
- Website: sjiblbd.com

Shahjalal Islami Bank PLC. (SJIBPLC) is a shariah compliant private sector commercial bank headquartered in Dhaka, Bangladesh.

== History ==
The bank was incorporated on May 10, 2001. The Shahjalal Islami Bank Foundation is the corporate social responsibility unit of the bank.

In May 2011, Anwer Hossain Khan, chairman of Modern Diagnostic Centre and Anwer Khan Modern Hospital, was elected chairman of Shahjalal Islami Bank Limited. Md Harun Miah, director of Kushiara Financial Services Limited, and Khandoker Sakib Ahmed, director of Zuiria Trade International, were elected vice-chairmen of Shahjalal Islami Bank Limited.

In November 2012, the Anti-Corruption Commission sued the former vice president of Shahjalal Islami Bank Limited, Sayed Hassan Imam, and five others for embezzling 131.7 million Taka from the bank.

In 2014, the Anti-Corruption Commission arrested bank director and former chairman Mohammed Solaiman on charges of embezzling 1.4 billion Taka from the bank through bad loans given to Joynob Steel, SK Steel, and Paradise Corporation. In the same year, another Director Mohammed Solaiman was accused by the Anti Corruption Commission charged his with misappropriating 1.49 billion Taka.

In 2015, Bangladesh Anti-Corruption Commission sued Bismillah Group’s Managing Director Khaza Solaiman Anwar Chowdhury for embezzling 1.1 billion Taka from Shahjalal Islami Bank Limited and 14 others including four employees of the bank. In June, AK Azad, chairman of Ha-Meem Group, was elected chairman of Shahjalal Islami Bank. Mohammad Younus, chairman of Younus Group of Industries, and Md Abdul Barek were elected vice-chairman of the bank.

In 2016, Bangladesh Anti-Corruption Commission's former deputy managing director of the bank, Md Monjerul Islam, and four others, were charged with embezzling 2.5 billion Taka. They did so by opening fake letter of credit.

In January 2018, Akkas Uddin Mollah, Chairman of Russel Spinning Mills Limited and Osman Memorial Hospital, was elected chairman of the bank. M Shahidul Islam was appointed managing director of the bank in October 2018. Khandoker Sakib Ahmed, managing director of Zuairia Group, and Mohammed Golam Quddus, representing Anwar Khan Modern Hospital Limited, were elected as vice-chairmen of the bank.

In January 2021, Md Sanaullah Shahid, chairman of Electra International, was re-elected chairman of the bank. Md Harun Miah, chairman of Hotel Pritom Inn and managing director of Shahjalal Islami Bank Securities, and Md Abdul Barek were re-elected vice-chairmen of the bank. Prashanta Kumar Halder used Shahjalal Islami Bank Limited to launder money from his embezzlement.

In January 2022, Mohammed Younus, managing director of Ananta Paper Mills Limited, was elected chairman of the bank. Mohiuddin Ahmed, chairman of Rupsha Trading Corporation, and Mohammed Golam Quddus were elected vice-chairmen of Shahjalal Islami Bank Limited.

In February 2024, AK Azad, managing director of Ha-Meem Group of Companies, was elected chairman of the Bank. Mohammed Younus, managing director of the Sobhan Ice & Cold Storage, and Mohiuddin Ahmed, proprietor of Rupsha Trading Corporation and Mohiuddin Auto House, have been re-elected vice-chairmen of the bank.

In January 2025, AK Azad, managing director of Companies, was re-elected as chairman of Shahjalal Islami Bank PLC. Mohammed Younus, managing director of the Sobhan Ice & Cold Storage and Mohiuddin Ahmed, proprietor of Rupsha Trading Corporation and Mohiuddin Auto House, were re-elected as vice-chairmen of the bank.
