= Bangladesh Secretariat =

Administrative headquarters of the Government of Bangladesh

- বাংলাদেশ সচিবালয়
- • Government Seal • National Emblem

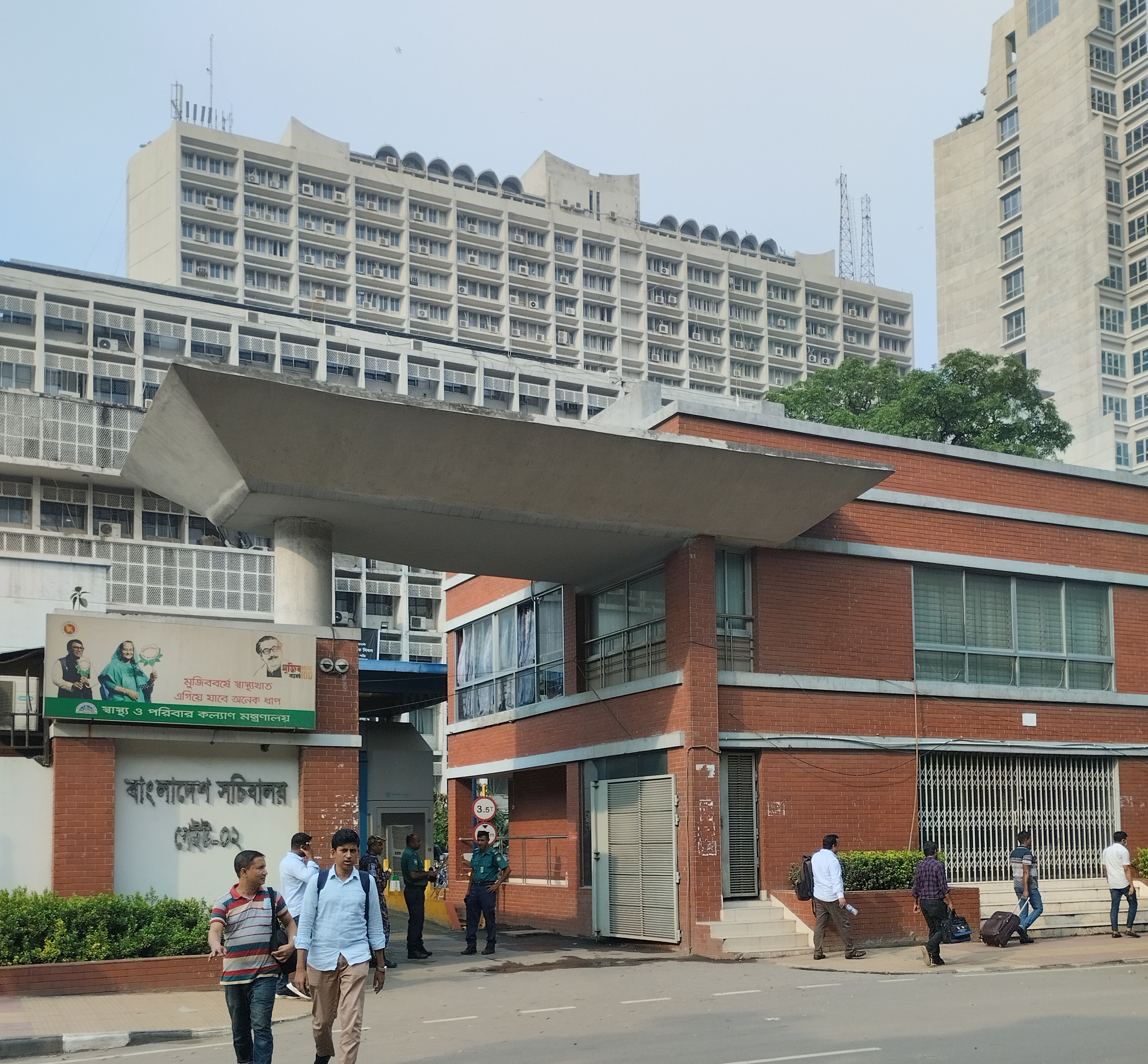
- Entrance of the secretariat building

General information
- Type: Government Secretariat
- Location: Abdul Gani Road, Segunbagicha, Dhaka, Bangladesh
- Coordinates: 23.7288°N 90.4086°E
- Construction started: 1947
- Completed: 1969; 57 years ago
- Owner: Government of Bangladesh

Other information
- Public transit: MRT Line 6 Bangladesh Secretariat

The Bangladesh Secretariat (Bengali: বাংলাদেশ সচিবালয়, romanized: Bangladesh Shochibaloy) is the administrative headquarters of the Government of Bangladesh, and houses the majority of ministries and government agencies and bodies, located in Segunbagicha, Dhaka. The secretariat can refer to the complex of ministries, or refer to the Bangladesh Civil Service central administration. Its political heads are the ministers while the administrative heads are the Secretaries to the Government. The Secretariat complex was originally constructed as the Secretariat of East Pakistan.

== History ==
The Daily Star reported on 15 July 2009 that the Bangladesh Secretariat was filled with lobbyists who were interfering with the duties of ministers and secretaries. Despite Prime Minister Sheikh Hasina calling for an end to lobbying at the secretariat, the Bangladesh Secretariat received 1,200 visitors a day.

On 9 May 2015, the ICT Division started providing free WiFi at their Bangladesh Secretariat.

The Cabinet Division declared the Bangladesh Secretariat a smoke-free zone on 24 October 2017.

Mohammed Nasim, the Minister of Health and Family Welfare, got stuck in a lift at the Bangladesh Secretariat for 23 minutes on 10 October 2016. It was a new lift that had been installed only for his usage.

On 7 July 2019, there was a fire at the Bangladesh Secretariat. The fire originated from the seventh floor of building six.

In March 2020, the Bangladesh Secretariat announced new restrictions on entrance due to the COVID-19 pandemic in Bangladesh. On 1 June 2020, the government announced that only 25 percent of the officials of Bangladesh Secretariat will work there physically while the about the same will work from home due to the pandemic.

Rozina Islam, a journalist for the daily Prothom Alo, was confined at the Bangladesh Secretariat for five hours and had her mobile phones seized after she went there to report on the Health Ministry on 17 April 2021. She was harassed and assaulted during her detention at the secretariat. After which Sibbir Ahmed Osmani, Deputy Secretary of the Health Ministry, filed a case against her under the Official Secrets Act of 1923. A subsequent press conference by the Ministry of Health in the Bangladesh Secretariat was boycotted by journalists following a decision of the Bangladesh Secretariat Reporters' Forum.

A new secretariat was proposed to be built at Sher-e-Bangla Nagar by the government to bring the secretariat closer to the Prime Minister's Office (PMO). The new building was supposed to take full account of the designs of the Jatiya Sangsad Bhaban building, made by prominent architect Louis Kahn. Prime Minister Sheikh Hasina set up a committee to suggest alternatives to the current building. Four nine-storied buildings with 14-storey foundation will be constructed on 32 acres of land. The proposal for relocating the secretariat from Segunbagicha to Sher-e-Bangla Nagar was cancelled and the secretariat will remain at Segunbagicha.

== Structure and departments ==
- Building # 1
  - Cabinet Division
  - Ministry of Public Administration
- Building # 3
  - Ministry of Commerce
  - Ministry of Health and Family Welfare
    - A. Health Services Division
    - B. Medical Education and Family Welfare Division
- Building # 4
  - Ministry of Chittagong Hill Tracts Affairs
  - Ministry of Agriculture
  - Ministry of Food
  - Ministry of Information
  - Ministry of Law, Justice and Parliamentary Affairs
    - A. Law and Justice Division
    - B. Legislative and Parliamentary Affairs Division
  - Ministry of Land
  - Ministry of Disaster Management and Relief
- Building # 5
  - Ministry of Housing and Public Works
- Building # 6
  - Ministry of Primary and Mass Education
  - Ministry of Cultural Affairs
  - Ministry of Education
    - A. Secondary And Higher Education Division
    - B. Technical And Madrasha Education Division
  - Ministry of Power, Energy and Mineral Resources
    - Power Division
    - B. Energy and Mineral Resources Division.
  - Ministry of Environment and Forest
  - Ministry of Fisheries and Livestock
  - Internal Resources Division (Ministry of Finance)
  - Ministry of Textiles and Jute
  - Ministry of Shipping
  - Ministry of Social Welfare
  - Ministry of Women and Children Affairs
  - Ministry of Science and Technology
- Building # 7
  - Ministry of Water Resources
  - Ministry of Youth and Sports
  - Ministry of Posts, Telecommunications and Information Technology
    - A. Posts and Telecommunications Division
  - Ministry of Local Government, Rural Development and Co-operatives
    - A. Local Government Division
    - B. Rural Development and Co-operatives Division
  - Ministry of Labour and Employment
  - Ministry of Finance
    - Finance Division
    - Financial Institutions Division
  - Ministry of Road Transport and Bridges
    - Road Transport and Highways Division
- Building # 8
  - Ministry of Home Affairs
    - Public Security Division
    - Security Services Division
  - Ministry of Religious Affairs

Reformed Structure –

- Building # 1
  - Cabinet Division
  - Joint Ministries of Establishment –
    - Ministry of Public Administration
    - Ministry of Local Government, Rural Development and Co-operatives
      - Local Government Division
      - Rural Development and Co-operatives Division
    - Ministry of Planning
  - Internal Resources Division (Ministry of Finance)
- Building # 2
  - Joint Ministries of Law, Education & Scientific Affairs–
    - Ministry of Law, Justice and Parliamentary Affairs
      - Law and Justice Division
      - Legislative and Parliamentary Affairs Division
    - Ministry of Primary and Mass Education
    - Ministry of Education
      - Secondary And Higher Education Division
      - Technical And Madrasha Education Division
    - Ministry of Science and Technology
- Building # 3
  - Joint Ministries of Defence –
    - Ministry of Defence
    - Armed Forces Division
- Building # 4
  - Joint Ministries of Natural Resources & Agrarian Affairs –
    - Ministry of Environment, Forest and Climate Change
    - Ministry of Agriculture
    - Ministry of Fisheries and Livestock
    - Ministry of Water Resources
    - Ministry of Food
    - Ministry of Power, Energy and Mineral Resources
      - Power Division
      - Energy and Mineral Resources Division.
- Building # 5
  - Joint Ministries of Communications & Public Works –
    - Ministry of Road Transport and Bridges
      - Road Transport and Highways Division
    - Ministry of Housing and Public Works
    - Ministry of Railways
    - Ministry of Posts, Telecommunications and Information Technology
      - Posts and Telecommunications Division
    - Ministry of Information and Broadcasting
- Building # 6
  - Joint Ministries of Public Ministrations & Welfare –
    - Ministry of Health and Family Welfare
      - Health Services Division
      - Medical Education and Family Welfare Division
    - Ministry of Social Welfare
    - Ministry of Women and Children Affairs
    - Ministry of Labour and Employment
    - Ministry of Expatriates Welfare and Overseas Employment
    - Ministry of Youth and Sports
    - Ministry of Cultural Affairs
    - Ministry of Religious Affairs
- Building # 7
  - Joint Ministries of Economic Affairs–
    - Ministry of Industries
    - Ministry of Commerce
    - Ministry of Shipping
    - Ministry of Civil Aviation and Tourism
    - Ministry of Textiles and Jute
  - Ministry of Finance
    - Finance Division
    - Financial Institutions Division
- Building # 8
  - Joint Ministries of Interior –
    - Ministry of Home Affairs
      - Public Security Division
      - Security Services Division
    - Ministry of Disaster Management and Relief
    - Ministry of Land
    - Ministry of Chittagong Hill Tracts Affairs

cabinet.gov :
