= British Welding Research Association =

Welding research organisation in the UK

- Formation: 1946; 80 years ago
- Legal status: Merged into the The Welding Institute
- Location: Abington Hall
- Region served: Worldwide

The British Welding Research Association (BWRA) was a research organisation that worked to advance welding technology and techniques.

== History ==
The British Welding Research Association (BWRA) has its origins in the The Welding Institute from which it effectively split off from in 1946; this reorganisation was necessitated by a restriction then imposed on professional institutions that prevented from them from acting as research organisations.

The newly-formed BWRA acquired Abington Hall in Cambridgeshire, which had formerly been used for military purposes; a welding shop was setup in the adjoining stables while research into metal fatigue was performed in another outbuilding at Abington. The association also operated at another location, 29 Park Crescent in London, where it established metallurgical laboratory, polishing room and machine shop. The first director of BWRA was Mr. A. Ramsey-Moon; he was succeeded by Dr. H. G. Taylor in early 1948.

One key research programme undertaken by BWRA (in conjunction with other organisations, including Imperial Chemical Industries and the metallurgy department of Leeds University amongst others) was into the steam-naphtha continuous reforming process; this work helped to define the fundamentals of structural behaviour, weldability and corrosion. The association also undertook influential studies of brittle fracture, fracture mechanics, and fatigue.

Between 1954 and 1968, the official British Welding Journal was published jointly by BWRA and The Welding Institute to circulate transactions and research reports. In 1965, BWRA formed the School of Applied Non-Destructive Testing, thus increasing its involvement in training within the profession.

In 1968, the Institute of Welding and the BWRA were combined together once more.
