= Bangladesh Fisheries Development Corporation =

Bangladeshi national corporation

- Formation: 1980
- Headquarters: Dhaka, Bangladesh
- Region served: Bangladesh
- Official language: Bengali
- Website: Bangladesh Fisheries Development Corporation

Bangladesh Fisheries Development Corporation or BFDC, is a national corporation that constructs fish harbours, runs cold storage, auction houses, processing centre, and transportation centre for fishes in Bangladesh and is located in Motijheel Thana, Dhaka, Bangladesh.

== History ==
From 1964 the corporation has managed the fishers of Karnafuli reservoir. The corporation was established as Bangladesh Fisheries Development Corporation in 1973. It owns large portion of the sea going fishing boats and ships in Bangladesh. It plays a role in the marketing and sales of fish from government owned water bodies.
