= Jatiya Samajtantrik Dal (Rab) =

Bangladeshi political party

Jatiya Samajtantrik Dal জাতীয় সমাজতান্ত্রিক দল
- President: A. S. M. Abdur Rab
- Secretary-General: Abdul Malek Ratan
- Founded: 1985
- Split from: Jatiya Samajtantrik Dal
- Headquarters: 65 Banglabandhu Avenue, Dhaka-1000
- Ideology: Socialism
- Political position: Left-wing
- National affiliation: Ganatantra Manch
- Bangladesh Parliament: 0 / 350

Election symbol
- "Tara" (Star)

Party flag
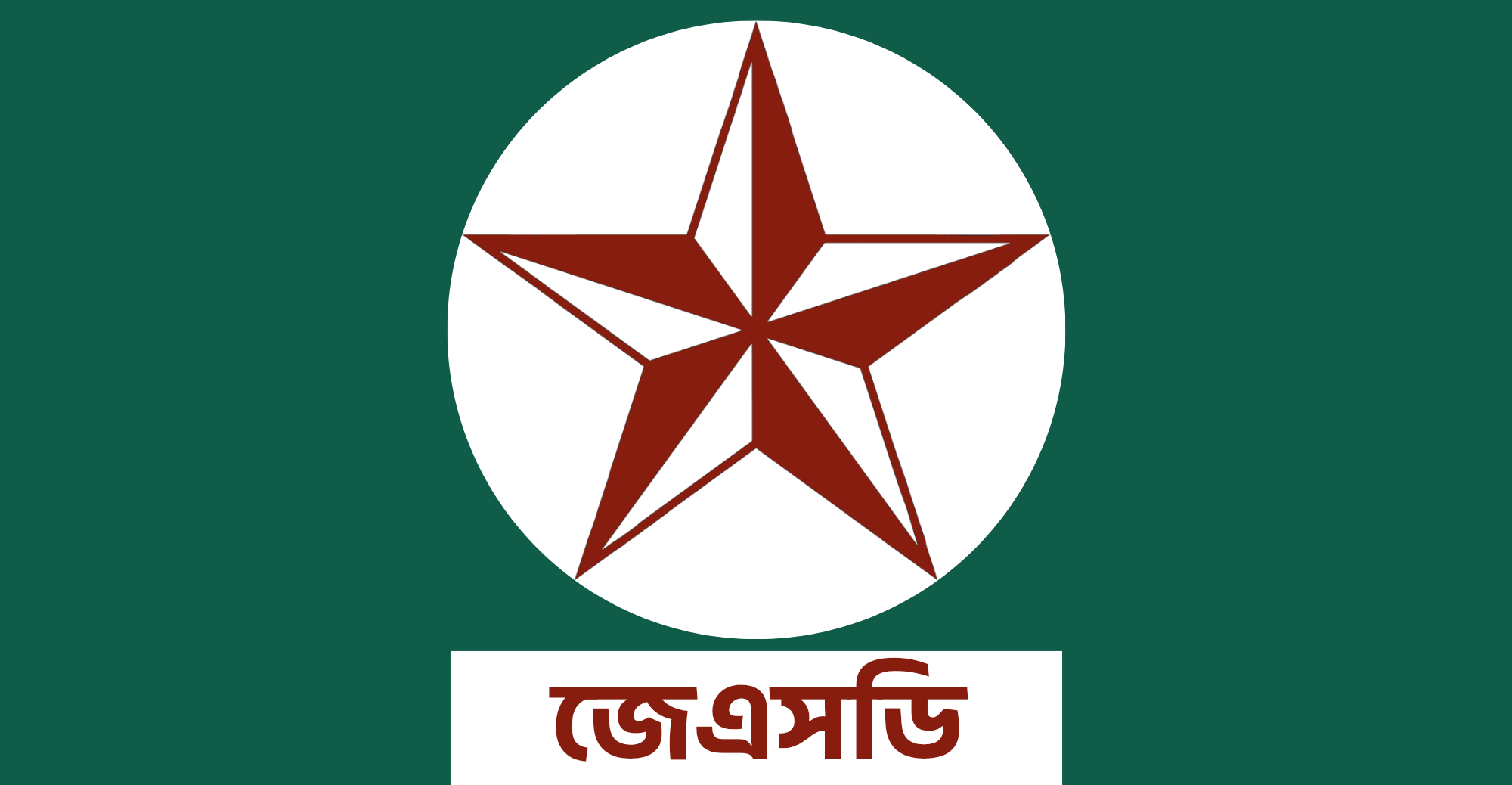

The Jatiya Samajtantrik Dal (Bengali: জাতীয় সমাজতান্ত্রিক দল, 'National Socialist Party') is a political party in Bangladesh. It was formed in 1985, through a split from the original Jatiya Samajtantrik Dal. The party is sometimes referred to as JSD (Rab) (after prominent party leader ASM Abdur Rab), to differentiate it from the mother party led by Hasanul Haq Inu. The Election Commission of Bangladesh calls the party Jatiya Samajtantrik Dal-JSD and the Inu-led party Jatiya Samajtantrik Dal-Jasad.
