= List of megaprojects in Bangladesh =

Large-scale project of Bangladesh

This is a list of megaprojects of Bangladesh, i.e. projects characterized by large investment commitment, vast complexity (especially in organizational terms), and long-lasting impact on the economy, the environment, and society. This is a dynamic list and may require constant updates. The Finance Minister of Bangladesh has recently unveiled an extensive roster of ambitious mega projects encompassing various sectors. These projects primarily focus on the construction of hospitals, schools, colleges, and other essential infrastructures. Consequently, this development surge is expected to generate a substantial demand for cement within the country.

== Terms explanation ==
Terms used in the Status column	Color
Proposed	
In Planning, approved, under/in development, under construction, reconstruction in progress, nearly complete	
On hold	
Abandoned, cancelled	
Completed	

== Airports ==
Project	Type	Location	Status	Cost (USD millions)	Notes
Hazrat Shahjalal International Airport Expansion	International airport	Dhaka	Completed	2,500	The passenger handling capacity of the airport has increased to 24 million from the current 8 million per annum. Cargo handling capacity has simultaneously increased to 500,000 from 200,000 tonnes annually.
Cox's Bazar International Airport Expansion	International airport	Cox's Bazar, Chittagong	Completed	300	It was the fourth international airport in Bangladesh. Before being stripped of its international status a day after it was announced.
Osmani International Airport Expansion	International airport	Sylhet	22% completed	255	The capacity of the airport will rise to 2 million annual passengers compared to the current capacity of 600,000.

== Bridges ==
Project	Location	Route	Length	Status	Cost (USD Billions)	Traffic	Notes	Provided Image
Padma Bridge	Louhajong, Munshiganj; Shariatpur, Madaripur		6.15 km	Completed	3.868	Road and Rail	The longest bridge in Bangladesh, and the longest over Ganges River in terms of both span and total length.	
Padma Rail Link	Dhaka, Mawa, Bhanga, Jessore	Dhaka–Narayanganj–Sreenagar–Mawa–Shibchar–Bhanga–Muksudpur–Kashiani–Lohagara–Narail–Jamdia–Rupdia–Jessore	169 km	Completed	4.63	Rail	Part of Padma Bridge project.	
Jamuna Railway Bridge	Sirajganj, Jamuna River		4.8 km	Completed	1.6	Rail	The largest dedicated rail bridge in the country.	
Rupsha Rail Bridge	Khulna, Rupsha River		5.13 km	Completed	0.50	Rail	Part of Khulna–Mongla Port line	
Bhola Bridge	Bhola District, Barisal District	Laharhat-Veduriya	10.867 km	Proposed	1.42	Road		
Shariatpur–Chadpur Bridge	Shariatpur District, Chadpur District	Horina–Alu Bazar	8 km	Proposed	1.30	Road		
Second Padma Bridge	Paturia-Daulatdia			Proposed				
Second Jamuna Bridge				Proposed				

== Road and highways ==
Project	Location	Route	Length	Status	Cost	Traffic	Notes	Provided Image
Karnaphuli Tunnel	Chittagong, Karnaphuli River	Dhaka-Chittagong-Cox's Bazar	3.32 km	Completed	USD $1.2 Billion	Underwater Road Tunnel	First underwater tunnel in South Asian region and a part of Dhaka-Chittagong-Cox's Bazar highway network.	
Dhaka Elevated Expressway	Dhaka	Shahjalal Airport- Banani- Tejgaon- Mogbazar-Kamalapur- Chittagong Road	19.73 km	80% Completed	USD $1.63 Billion	Expressway	It is the country's first elevated expressway.	
Chittagong Elevated Expressway	Chittagong	Shah Amanat Airport - Lalkhan Bazar	18 km	Completed	USD $4 Billion	Expressway	28.5 km with connecting ramps.	
Dhaka - Chittagong Expressway	Dhaka, Chittagong	Dhaka - Chittagong	233 km	In Planning	USD $10.2 Billion (Tk 1.25 Trillion)	Expressway	Was previously cancelled,now being reconsidered.	
BRT Line 3 (Northern Section)	Dhaka	Gazipur-Airport-Mohakhali-Ramna-Gulistan-Keraniganj-Jhilmil	22.4 km	Cancelled		Bus Rapid Transit		
BRT Line 7	Dhaka, Narayanganj	Kamargaon-Narayanganj	34 km	Cancelled		Bus Rapid Transit		
Dhaka Inner Ring Road	Dhaka		88 km	Proposed		Road		
Dhaka Outer Ring Road	Dhaka		132 km	Proposed		Road		
Bus Route Rationalization	Dhaka	n/a	n/a	Proposed		Road Transport	DTCA	

== Railways ==
Project	Location	Route	Length	Status	Cost	Traffic	Notes	Provided Image
Dhaka-Chittagong High-Speed Railway	Dhaka, Chittagong	Dhaka - Chittagong	227.3 km	Canceled	USD $15 Billion	High-Speed Rail	Suspended indefinitely.	
Chittagong-Cox's Bazar Railway Link	Chittagong, Cox's Bazar	Chittagong - Cox's Bazar	100 km	Completed	USD $2.13 Billion	Suburban Rail	Part of Trans - Asian Railway	
Dhaka MRT Line-1 (Purbachal Route)	Dhaka	Purbachal New Town Project- Notun Bazar	11.3 km	Under construction		Rapid Transit	To be operational from late 2030.	
Dhaka MRT Line-1 (Airport Route)	Dhaka	Hazrat Shahjalal International Airport-Kamalapur	19.8 km	Under construction	USD $6.1 Billion	Rapid Transit	The line will be underground. To be operational from late 2030.	
Dhaka MRT Line-2	Dhaka	Gabtoli - Narayanganj (Main Line) / Sararghat (Branch Line)	35 km	Proposed		Rapid Transit	Expected to be operational from 2030.	
Dhaka MRT Line-4	Dhaka	Kamalapur metro station - Madanpur	16 km	Proposed	USD $2.8 Billion	Rapid Transit	Expected to be operational from 2030.	
Dhaka MRT Line-5 (Northern Route)	Dhaka	Hemayetpur - Vatara	20 km	Under construction	USD $4.6 Billion	Rapid Transit	To be operational from 2028.	
Dhaka MRT Line 5 (Southern Route)	Dhaka	Gabtoli - Dasherkandi	17.4 km	Approved	USD $4.7 Billion	Rapid Transit	To be operational from 2030.	
Dhaka MRT Line-6	Dhaka	Uttara North–Agargaon	21.26 km	Completed	USD $2.8 Billion	Rapid Transit	Phase 1 consists of 11.73 km of track.	
Dhaka MRT Line-6	Dhaka	Agargaon–Motijheel	21.26 km	Completed	USD $2.8 Billion	Rapid Transit	Phase 2 consists of an 8.37 km extension.	
Dhaka MRT Line-6	Dhaka	Motijheel-Kamalapur	21.26 km	76% completed	USD $2.8 Billion	Rapid Transit	Phase 3 consists of an 1.16 km extension. To be operational from early 2027.	
Dhaka Subway	Dhaka		238 km	Proposed	USD $8 Billion	Rapid Transit	Dhaka Subway is an underground urban rail network being planned in Dhaka, the capital city of Bangladesh, by the Bangladesh Bridge Authority.	
Chittagong Monorail	Chittagong		54 km	Approved		Rapid Transit	Memorandum signed with construction firm.	
Dhaka Circular Railway	Dhaka		81 km	Feasibility Studies Underway		Suburban Rail	Expected to be operational from 2030 (if approved).	

== Energy projects ==
Project	Location	Capacity (MW)	Status	Cost	Notes	Provided Image
Rooppur Nuclear Power Plant	Ishwardi, Pabna District	2400MW	99% completed	US$12.65 billion	Country's first nuclear power plant. Complete operation comprising two additional units set for June 2027.	
Matarbari Power Plant	Cox's Bazar	1200MW	Completed			
Nuclear Power Plant	Southern Bangladesh		In Planning Stage		Ongoing plans to build second power plant in Southern Bangladesh.	
Payra Thermal Power plant	Patuakhali, Payra	1320MW	Completed	US$2.48 billion	It is the largest hydrocarbon power plant in Bangladesh.	
Banshkhali Power Plant	Banshkhali, Chattogram	1350MW	Completed			
Underground Power Distribution System	Dhaka, Narayanganj	1001 km Unknown		US$2.5 billion	Includes setting up 40 substations in the city and moving overhead cables.	

== Ports ==
Project	Location	Status	Cost	Notes	Provided Image
Matarbari Deep Sea Port	Maheshkhali, Cox's Bazar	18% completed	USD $2.409 Billion	First deep sea port of Bangladesh. Projected completion in December 2029.	
Payra Sea Port	Payra, Barisal	Under Construction	Tk5,219 crore	Originally planned as a deep sea port.	

== Defense ==
Project	Location	Status	Cost	Notes	Provided Image
Bangladesh Navy frigate program	Chittagong Dry Dock Limited	1% completed	USD$2.0 - USD$2.5 Billion	Six stealth guided missile frigates are expected to be constructed at Chittagong Dry Dock Limited for Bangladesh Navy and launched into service in 2030.	
BNS Pekua Submarine Base	Cox's Bazar, Chittagong	Completed	USD $1.2 Billion	A full-fledged submarine base of the Bangladesh Navy capable of anchoring six submarines and eight warships.	
Next Generation Fighter-Jet Programme	n/a	In Progress	USD $2.3 Billion	Procurement program for 20 Chinese Chengdu J-10CE multirole combat aircraft.	
Indigenous Trainer Development Programme	Bangabandhu Aeronautical Centre	Proposed		On June 14, 2023, in Bangladesh Air Force Academy, Air Chief Marshal Shaikh Abdul Hannan announced BAF engineers have successfully developed a prototype for indigenous aircraft and will be officially revealed in future. In November 2023, inaugural test flight of the BBT-2 was conducted.	

== Buildings and housing ==
Project	Location	Height	Status	Cost	Notes	Provided Image
Legacy Tower	Purbachal	465 m / 1525 ft	Proposed	n/a	Proposed 111-floor supertall commercial skyscraper.	
Liberation Tower	Purbachal	328 m / 1076 ft	Proposed	n/a	Proposed 71-floor supertall commercial skyscraper. Expected to be operational from 2030.	
Language Tower	Purbachal	259 m / 849 ft	Proposed	n/a	Proposed 52-floor commercial skyscraper. Expected to be operational from 2034.	
Purbachal Central Business District	Purbachal	--	Proposed	USD $17 Billion	Three proposed 250m+ skyscrapers, surrounded by thirty-eight 40+ floor skyscrapers.	
Iconic Tower	Purbachal	734 m / 2408 ft	Vision	USD $1.2 Billion	142-floor megatall skyscraper	
Prime Minister Tower	Dhaka	--	Proposed	n/a	Supertall 75 story commercial skyscraper as a centerpiece of proposed CBD on the banks of Buriganga river.	
Jolshiri Twin Towers - Tower 1	Jolshiri Abashon, Rupganj, Narayanganj	n/a	Under construction	n/a	Proposed skyscraper in Jolshiri Abashon CBD.	
Jolshiri Twin Towers - Tower 2	Jolshiri Abashon, Rupganj, Narayanganj	n/a	Under construction	n/a	Proposed skyscraper in Jolshiri Abashon CBD.	
Jolshiri Central Business District	Jolshiri Abashon, Rupganj, Narayanganj	n/a	Under construction	n/a	A modern Central Business District with skyscrapers, high rises, glass and modern buildings with advanced facilities.	
Kamrangirchar Central Business District	Kamrangirchar, Dhaka	n/a	Proposed	n/a	A modern Central Business District with 1200 acres of land that will have: skyscrapers; high rise convention centers, and; a 75 storied central modern building with advanced facilities; to attract foreign businesses similar to Shanghai or Dubai.	
Ashrayan Project	Nationwide	n/a	Under construction	n/a	This project is a Social Safety Net Programme of the government.	
My Village My Town	Rural area	n/a	Proposed	Tk1.5 Trillion	It is a Peri-urbanisation project for 87,230 villages from 64 district.	

== Sports ==
Project	Location	Capacity	Status	Cost	Notes	Provided Image
National Cricket Ground	Purbachal	50,000–70,000	proposed	US$110 million	Formerly known as "Sheikh Hasina International Cricket Stadium" and "The Boat".	

== Barrages ==
Project	Location	Status	Cost	Notes	Provided Image
Teesta River Management Project	Rangpur Division	Proposed	USD $1 Billion	Taming and irrigation project because of the periodic drying up of the Teesta River in Bangladesh due to the Dam and water block by India. The Chinese government showed interest in investment and technical help for this project.	
Padma Barrage Project	Pangsha, Rajbari District	Planned	Tk50,444 crore	Will be under construction by January - March 2027	

== Delta plan ==
Project	Location	Status	Cost	Notes	Provided Image
Bangladesh Delta Plan, 2100	Coastal Area	Vision	USD $38 Billion	Consists of a total of 80 projects: 65 are physical projects, and 15 are institutional and knowledge development projects at the first phase up to 2030.	

== Satellites ==
Project	Status	Cost	Vehicle	Notes	Provided Image
Bangladesh Satellite-1	Launched	USD $248 million	(United States) Falcon 9	Launched in 2018	
Bangladesh Satellite-2	In limbo	USD $435 million		High interest rate, government change has put the project on hold.	

== Special economic zones ==
Project	Location	Status	Area	Investment	Investors	Notes	Provided Image
Japanese Economic Zone	Araihazar, Narayanganj	Under Construction	991 acres / 4.01 km^{2}	USD $1 Billion	N/A	A project of BEZA and JICA	
Mirsarai Economic Zone	Chittagong	Under Construction	30,000 acres / 121.40 km^{2}	USD $100 Billion	Honda, SK, Nippon Steel, Mercedes, BMW, Wilmar, PHP, Bashundhara, BSRM, MEIGO etc.	Largest Economic zone in Asia	
Active Pharmaceutical Ingredients (API) Industrial Park	Munshiganj	Launched	216 acres / 0.87 km^{2}	301 Crore Tk	Square, BEXIMCO, SK+F, Renata Ltd, Incepta etc.	Focused on raw material manufacturing	
