= Chittagong Monorail =

Proposed monorail system in Bangladesh

Overview
- Native name: চট্টগ্রাম মনোরেল
- Owner: Road Transport and Highways Division
- Locale: Chittagong, Bangladesh
- Transit type: Mass Rapid Transit
- Headquarters: Chittagong, Bangladesh

The Chittagong Monorail, officially the Chattogram Monorail (চট্টগ্রাম মনোরেল), was a proposed monorail system intended to serve Chittagong and its adjoining areas. Initially conceived to ease growing traffic congestion in the port city, the project was planned to operate as a mass rapid transit system but has since been cancelled.

A transport feasibility study for a Chittagong Metro Rail transit system began in January 2023 and was expected to conclude by June 2025. Following a subsequent pivot to a monorail system, the project was officially scrapped in June 2026. The Chattogram City Corporation (CCC) revoked all project agreements after a diplomatic and corporate investigation revealed that the individual who signed the Memorandum of Understanding (MoU) was a fraudulent representative lacking legal authorization from the participating international consortium. Dhaka Transport Coordination Authority is evaluating which transport system is most suitable for the city.

== History ==
=== Feasibility study and initial proposals ===
The "Transport Masterplan and Preliminary Feasibility Study for Urban Metrorail Transit Construction in Chittagong Metropolitan Area (CMA)" was approved by the Executive Committee of the National Economic Council (ECNEC) on 22 November 2022. The study was officially inaugurated in January 2023 at the Radisson Blu Bay View in Chittagong by the then Minister of Road Transport and Bridges, Obaidul Quader. Although both China and South Korea expressed intent to invest in the project, authorities decided to partner with South Korea, with the study funded by the Korea International Cooperation Agency (KOICA). The total cost of the master plan was set at ৳70.6258 crore, with the Government of Bangladesh providing ৳13.6258 crore and KOICA contributing ৳57 crore.

The plans faced opposition from the Forum for Planned Chattogram (FPC), which directly opposed the construction of a conventional metro rail service in the city. Citing urban research, the FPC recommended a bus rapid transit (BRT) system as a more financially viable alternative, raising concerns about project sustainability and the allocation of state resources amid the nation's foreign-currency crisis.

=== Monorail pivot and cancellation ===
On 1 June 2025, the interim government announced a shift in strategy, proposing a monorail system for the city instead of a standard metro rail. A Memorandum of Understanding (MoU) was signed the same day at the World Trade Center Chittagong in Agrabad. The preliminary agreement was established between the Chittagong City Corporation (CCC) and the "Arab Contractors Orascom Peninsula Consortium," a joint venture involving Orascom Construction and The Arab Contractors, both of which are Egyptian engineering and construction multinationals.

The project was officially cancelled on 24 June 2026. Following an investigation supported by the Egyptian Embassy in Dhaka, the Ministry of Foreign Affairs, and the Bangladesh Investment Development Authority (BIDA), it was found that the individual who executed the agreement on behalf of the consortium was a fraudulent representative acting without corporate authorization or valid legal backing. As the agreement was deemed legally null, CCC Mayor Dr. Shahadat Hossain issued an official office order scrapping all agreements for the proposed ৳25,000 crore infrastructure development.

== Proposed routes ==
Prior to the project's cancellation, a preliminary framework outlined a network spanning approximately 54.5 kilometres across three primary routes:

- Line 1: Spanning 26.5 kilometres from Kalurghat to Shah Amanat International Airport via Bahaddarhat, Chawkbazar, Lalkhan Bazar, Dewanhat, and Patenga.
- Line 2: Spanning 13.5 kilometres from City Gate to Shaheed Bashiruzzaman Square via A.K. Khan, Nimtali, Sadarghat, and Firingi Bazar.
- Line 3: Spanning 14.5 kilometres from Oxygen, connecting key central commercial districts of the port city.

== See also ==
- Dhaka Metro Rail
- Chittagong Circular Railway
- Bangladesh Railway
- Chittagong Elevated Expressway
- DHK-CTG Bullet Train
- Dhaka Subway
- Dhaka Bus Rapid Transit (Dhaka Line)
