= Water security =

Goal of water management to harness water-related opportunities and manage risks

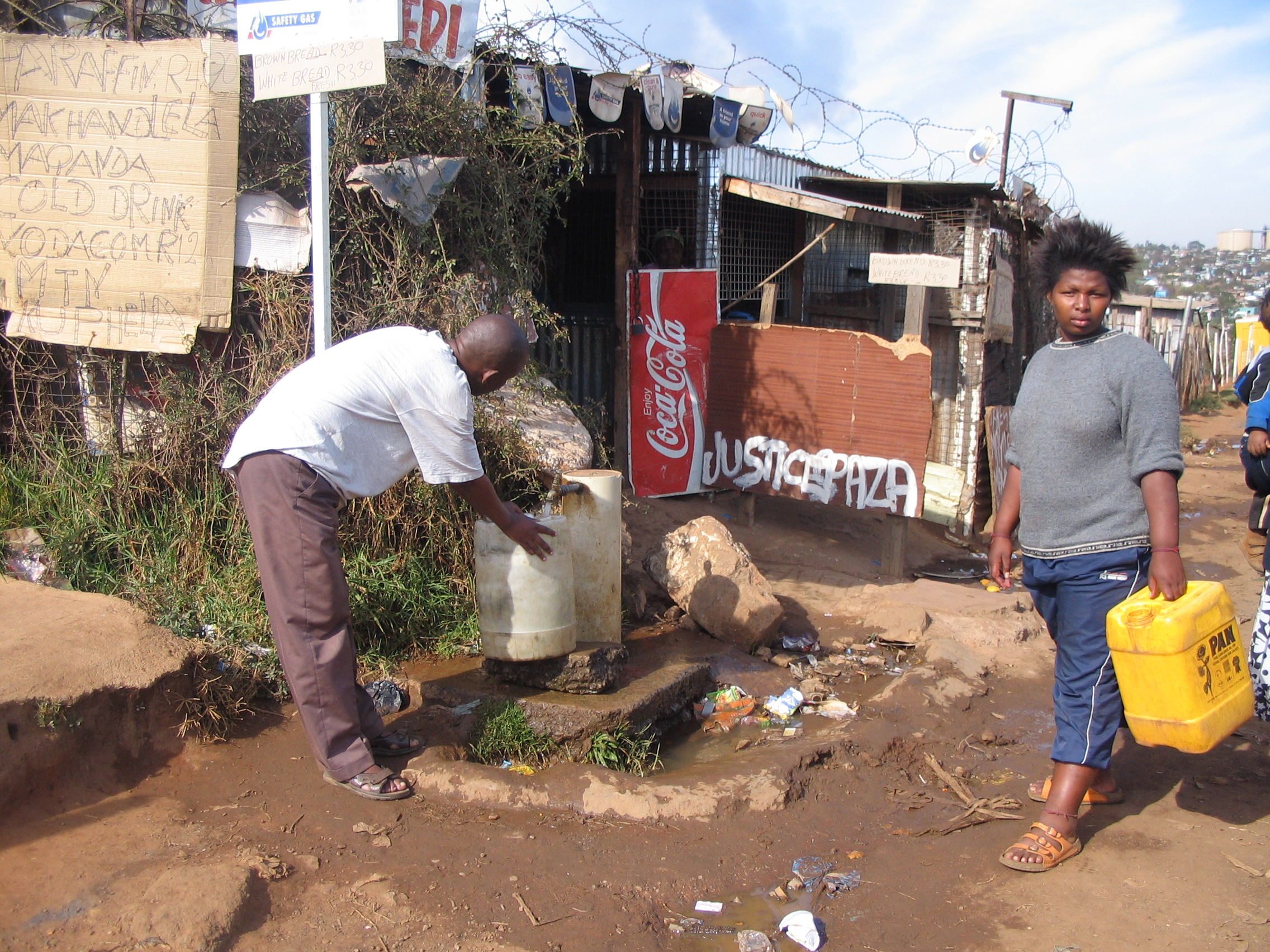
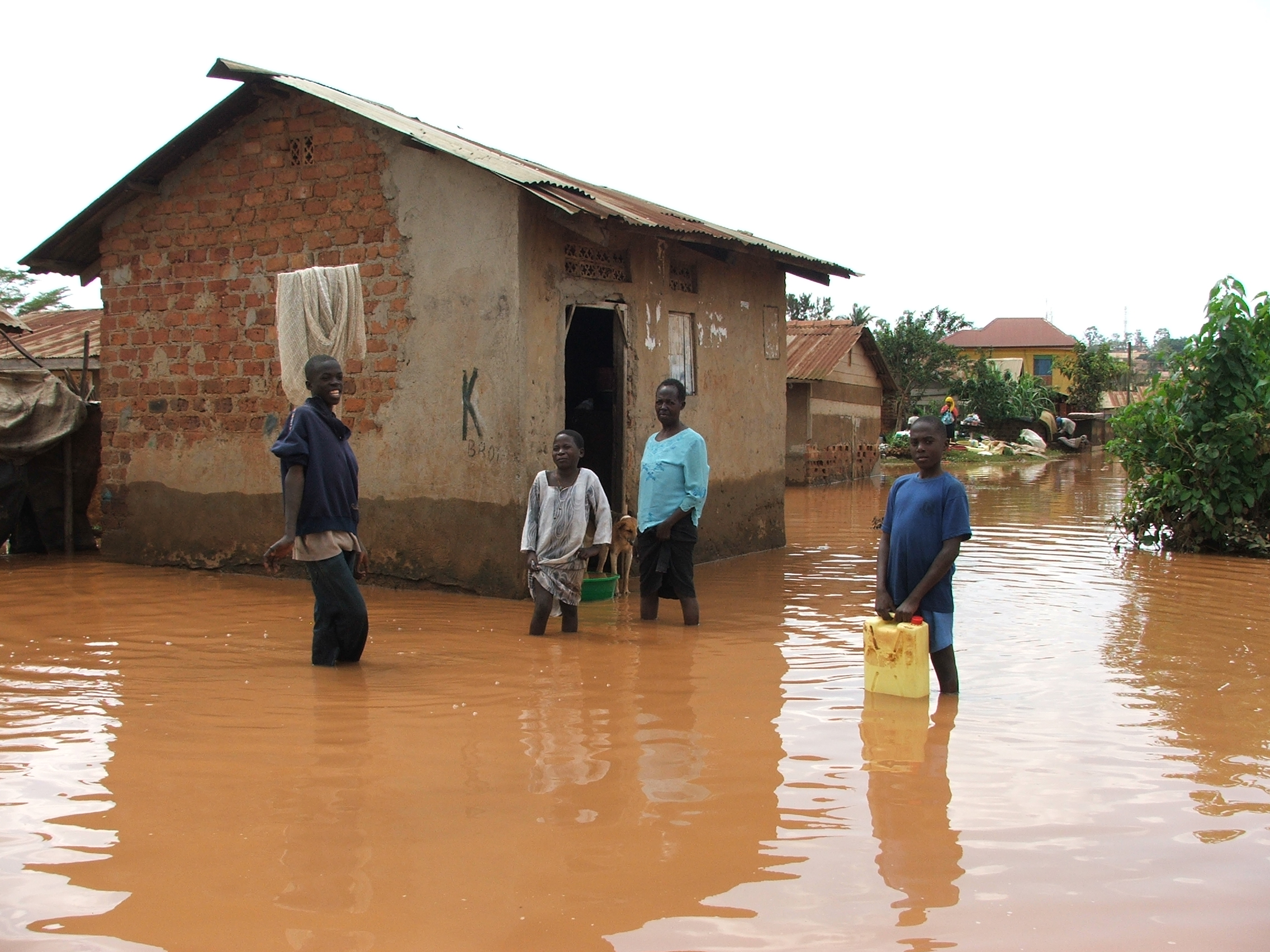
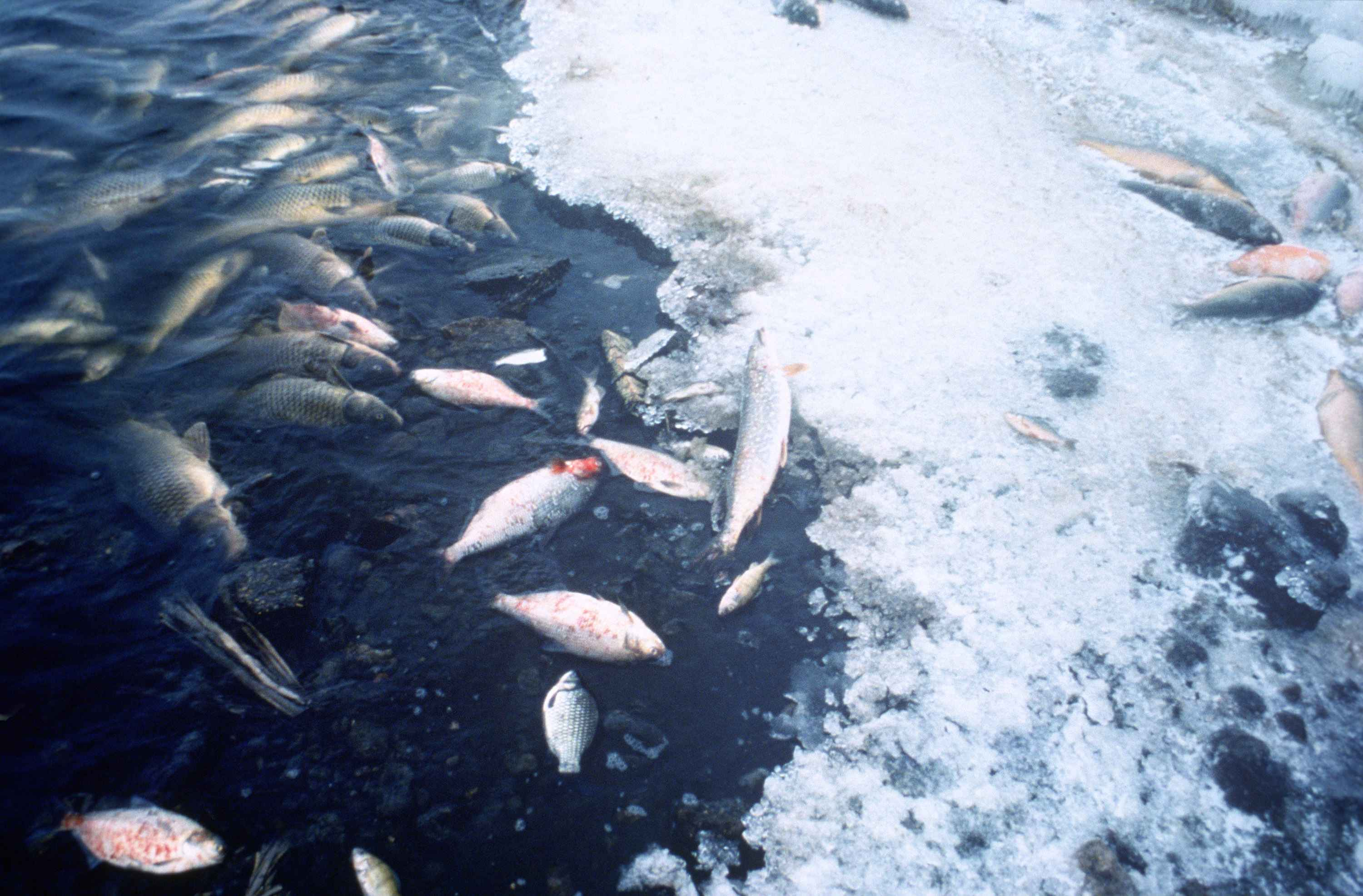
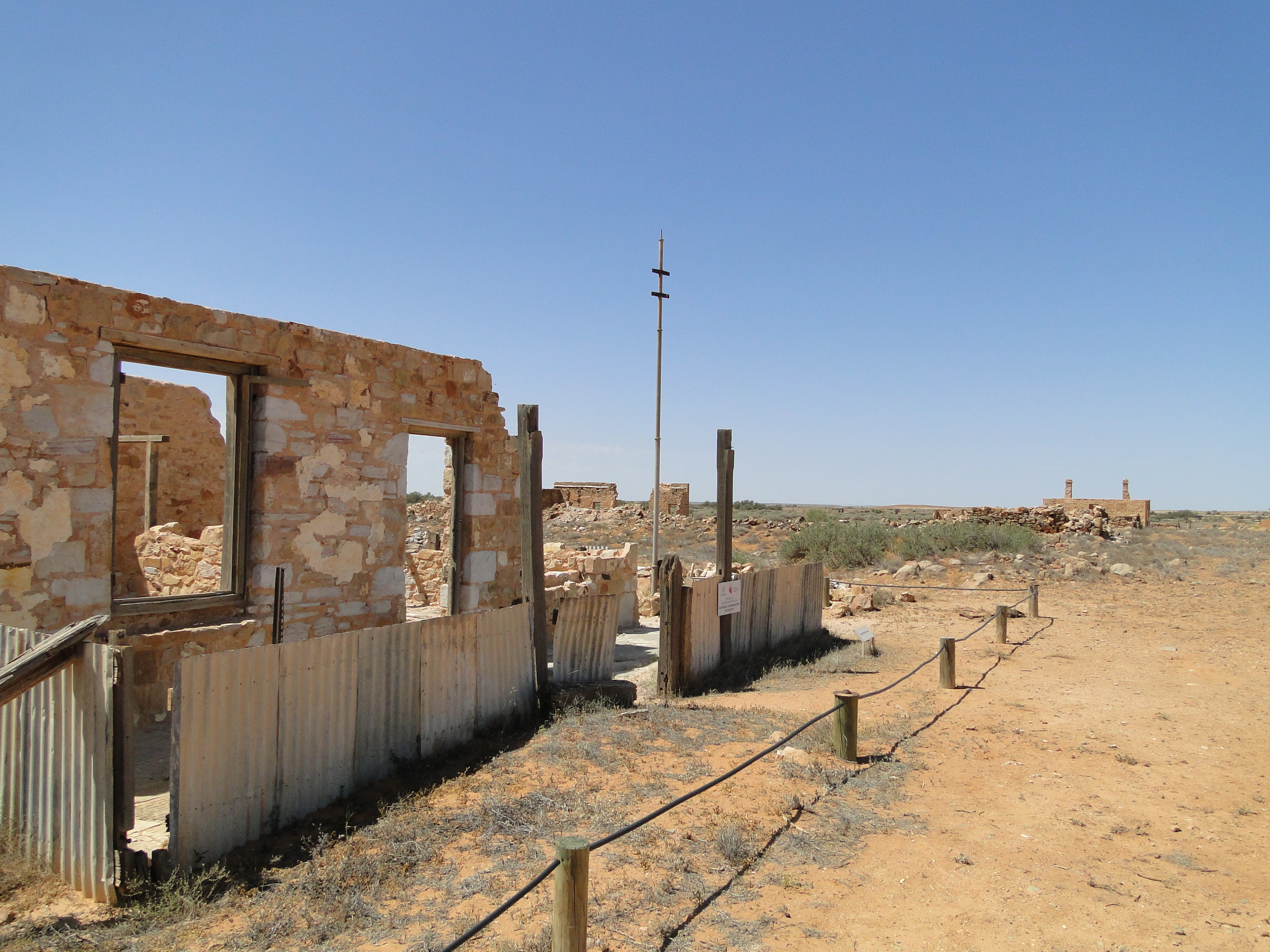
Water security has many different aspects: a communal tap for water supply in Soweto, South Africa; residents standing in flood water in Kampala, Uganda; water pollution can lead to eutrophication, harmful algal blooms and fish kills; the town of Farina in South Australia abandoned due to years of drought and dust storms.

The aim of water security is to maximize the benefits of water for humans and ecosystems. The second aim is to limit the risks of destructive impacts of water to an acceptable level. These risks include too much water (flood), too little water (drought and water scarcity), and poor quality (polluted) water. People who live with a high level of water security always have access to "an acceptable quantity and quality of water for health, livelihood, and production". For example, access to water, sanitation, and hygiene services is one part of water security. Some organizations use the term "water security" more narrowly, referring only to water supply aspects.

Decision makers and water managers aim to reach water security goals that address multiple concerns. These outcomes can include increasing economic and social well-being while reducing risks tied to water. There are linkages and trade-offs between the different outcomes. Planners often consider water security effects for varied groups when they design climate change reduction strategies.

Three main factors determine how difficult or easy it is for a society to sustain its water security. These include the hydrologic environment, the socio-economic environment, and future changes due to the effects of climate change. Decision makers may assess water security risks at varied levels. These range from the household to community, city, basin, country and region.

The opposite of water security is water insecurity. Water insecurity is a growing threat to societies. The main factors contributing to water insecurity are water scarcity, water pollution and low water quality due to climate change impacts. Others include poverty, destructive forces of water, and disasters that stem from natural hazards. Climate change affects water security in many ways. Changing rainfall patterns, including droughts, can have a big impact on water availability. Flooding can worsen water quality. Stronger storms can damage infrastructure, especially in the Global South.

There are different ways to deal with water insecurity. Science and engineering approaches can increase the water supply or make water use more efficient. Financial and economic tools can include a safety net to ensure access for poorer people. Management tools such as demand caps can improve water security. They work on strengthening institutions and information flows. They may also improve water quality management, and increase investment in water infrastructure. Improving the climate resilience of water and hygiene services is important. These efforts help to reduce poverty and achieve sustainable development.

There is no single method to measure water security. Metrics of water security roughly fall into two groups. This includes those that are based on experiences versus metrics that are based on resources. The former mainly focus on measuring the water experiences of households and human well-being. The latter tend to focus on freshwater stores or water resources security.

The IPCC Sixth Assessment Report found that increasing weather and climate extreme events have exposed millions of people to acute food insecurity and reduced water security. Scientists have observed the largest impacts in Africa, Asia, Central and South America, Small Islands and the Arctic. The report predicted that global warming of 2 °C would expose roughly 1–4 billion people to water stress. It finds 1.5–2.5 billion people live in areas exposed to water scarcity.

== Definitions ==
=== Broad definition ===
There are various definitions for the term water security. It emerged as a concept in the 21st century. It is broader than the absence of water scarcity. It differs from the concepts of food security and energy security. Whereas those concepts cover reliable access to food or energy, water security covers not only the absence of water but also its presence when there is too much of it.

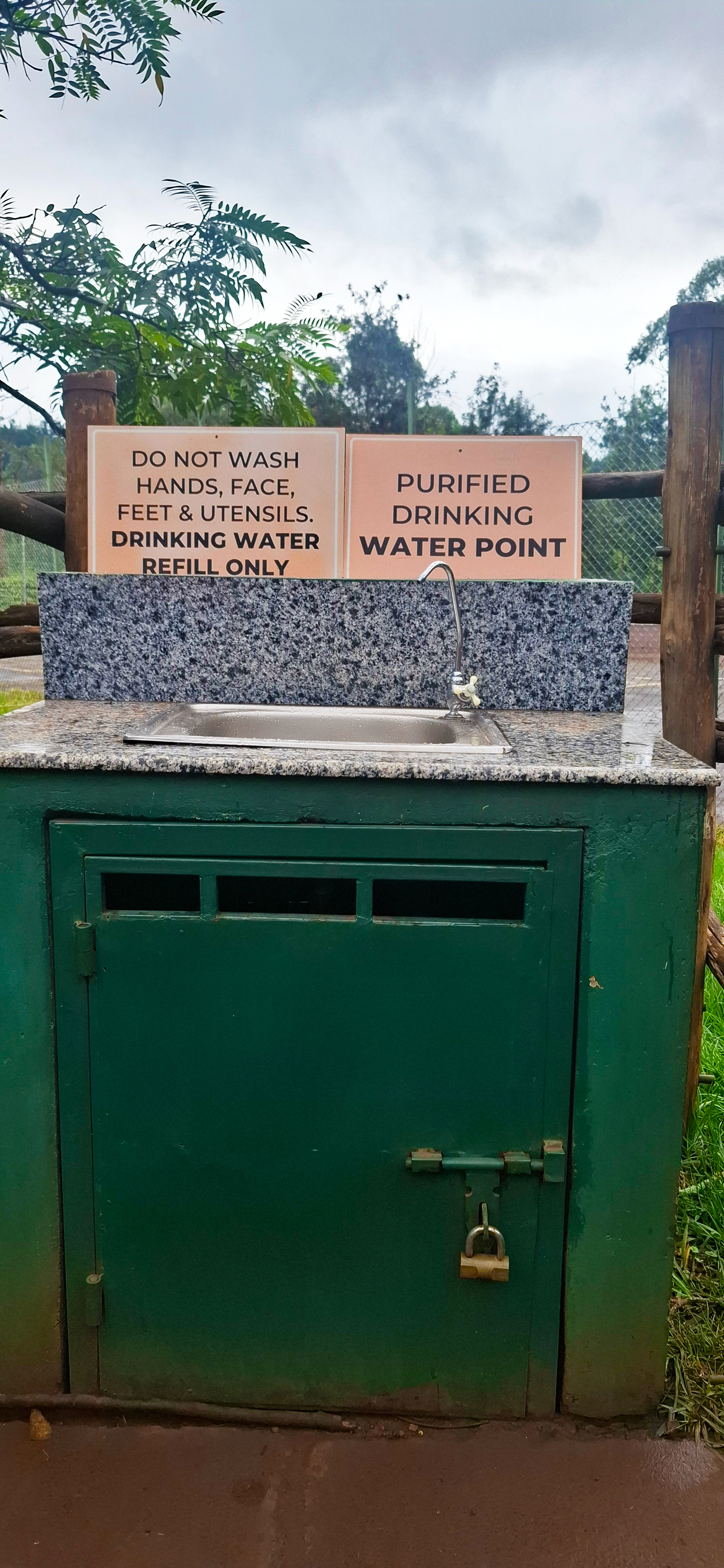
Safe Purified Drinking Water Point in Karura Forest, Nairobi Kenya

One definition of water security is "the reliable availability of an acceptable quantity and quality of water for health, livelihoods and production, coupled with an acceptable level of water-related risks".

A similar definition of water security by UN-Water is: "the capacity of a population to safeguard sustainable access to adequate quantities of acceptable quality water for sustaining livelihoods, human well-being, and socio-economic development, for ensuring protection against water-borne pollution and water-related disasters, and for preserving ecosystems in a climate of peace and political stability."

World Resources Institute also gave a similar definition in 2020. "For purposes of this report, we define water security as the capacity of a population to

- safeguard sustainable access to adequate quantities of acceptable quality water for sustaining livelihoods, human well-being, and socioeconomic development;
- protect against water pollution and water-related disasters; and
- preserve ecosystems, upon which clean water availability and other ecosystem services depend."

=== Narrower definition with a focus on water supply ===
Some organizations use water security in a more specific sense to refer to water supply only. They do not consider the water-related risks of too much water. For example, the definition of WaterAid in 2012 focuses on water supply issues. They defined water security as "reliable access to water of sufficient quantity and quality for basic human needs, small-scale livelihoods and local ecosystem services, coupled with a well managed risk of water-related disasters". The World Water Council also uses this more specific approach with a focus on water supply. "Water security refers to the availability of water, in adequate quantity and quality, to sustain all these needs together (social and economic sectors, as well as the larger needs of the planet's ecosystems) – without exceeding its ability to renew."

=== Relationship with WASH and IWRM ===
WASH (water, sanitation and hygiene) is an important concept when in discussions of water security. Access to WASH services is one part of achieving water security. The relationship works both ways. To be sustainable, WASH services need to address water security issues. For example WASH relies on water resources that are part of the water cycle. But climate change has many impacts on the water cycle which can threaten water security. There is also growing competition for water. This reduces the availability of water resources in many areas in the world.

Water security incorporates ideas and concepts to do with the sustainability, integration and adaptiveness of water resource management. In the past, experts used terms such as integrated water resources management (IWRM) or sustainable water management for this.

== Related concepts ==
=== Water risk ===
Water risk refers to the possibility of problems to do with water. Examples are water scarcity, water stress, flooding, infrastructure decay and drought. There exists an inverse relationship between water risk and water security. This means as water risk increases, water security decreases. Water risk is complex and multilayered. It includes risks flooding and drought. These can lead to infrastructure failure and worsen hunger. When these disasters take place, they result in water scarcity or other problems. The potential economic effects of water risk are important to note. Water risks threaten entire industries. Examples are the food and beverage sector, agriculture, oil and gas and utilities. Agriculture uses 69% of total freshwater in the world. So this industry is very vulnerable to water stress.

Risk is a combination of hazard, exposure and vulnerability. Examples of hazards are droughts, floods and decline in quality. Bad infrastructure and bad governance lead to high exposure to risk.

The financial sector is becoming more aware of the potential impacts of water risk and the need for its proper management. By 2025, water risk will threaten $145 trillion in assets under management.

To control water risk, companies can develop water risk management plans. Stakeholders within financial markets can use these plans to measure company environmental, social and governance (ESG) performance. They can then identify leaders in water risk management. The World Resources Institute has developed an online water data platform named Aqueduct for risk assessment and water management. China Water Risk is a nonprofit dedicated to understanding and managing water risk in China. The World Wildlife Fund has a Water Risk Filter that helps companies assess and respond to water risk with scenarios for 2030 and 2050.

Understanding risk is part of water security policy. But it is also important to take social equity considerations more into account.

There is no wholly accepted theory or mathematical model for determining or managing water risk. Instead, managers use a range of theories, models and technologies to understand the trade-offs that exist in responding to risk.

=== Water conflict ===
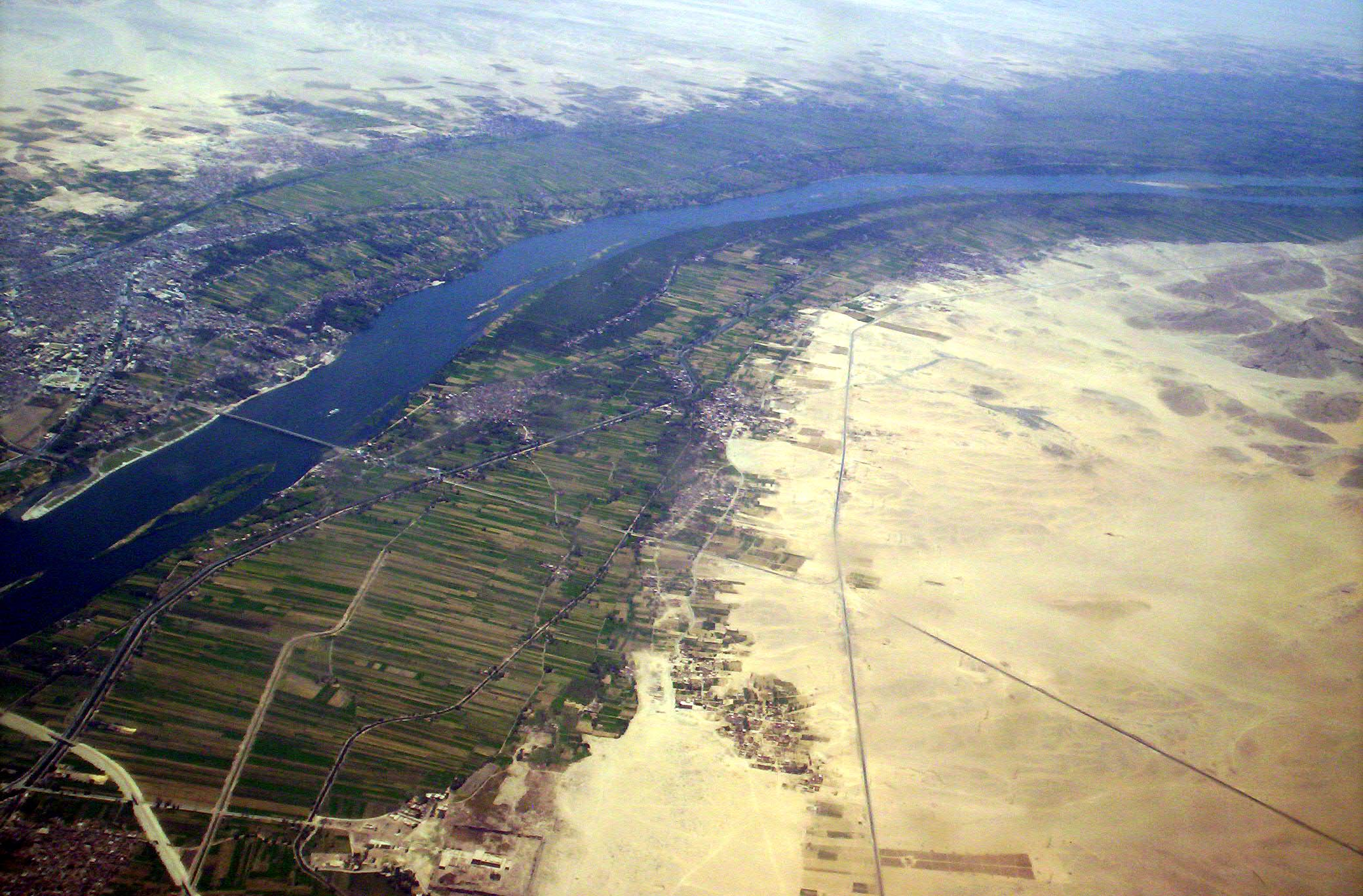
Ethiopia's move to fill the GERD dam's reservoir could reduce Nile flows by as much as 25% and devastate Egyptian farmlands.

Water conflict typically refers to violence or disputes associated with access to, or control of, water resources, or the use of water or water systems as weapons or casualties of conflicts. The term water war is colloquially used in media for some disputes over water, and often is more limited to describing a conflict between countries, states, or groups over the rights to access water resources. The United Nations recognizes that water disputes result from opposing interests of water users, public or private. A wide range of water conflicts appear throughout history, though they are rarely traditional wars waged over water alone. Instead, water has long been a source of tension and one of the causes for conflicts. Water conflicts arise for several reasons, including territorial disputes, a fight for resources, and strategic advantage.

Water conflicts can occur on the intrastate and interstate levels. Interstate conflicts occur between two or more countries that share a transboundary water source, such as a river, sea, or groundwater basin. For example, the Middle East has only 1% of the world's fresh water shared among 5% of the world's population and most of the rivers cross international borders. Intrastate conflicts take place between two or more parties in the same country, such as conflicts between farmers and urban water users.

== Desired outcomes ==
There are three groups of water security outcomes. These include economic, environmental and equity (or social) outcomes. Outcomes are things that happen or people would want to see happen as a result of policy and management:

- Economic outcomes: Sustainable growth which takes changing water needs and threats into account. Sustainable growth includes job creation, increased productivity and standards of living.
- Environmental outcomes: Quality and availability of water for the ecosystems services that depend on this water resource. Loss of freshwater biodiversity and depletion of groundwater are examples of negative environmental outcomes.
- Equity or social outcomes: Inclusive services so that consumers, industry and agriculture can access safe, reliable, sufficient and affordable water. These also mean they can dispose of wastewater safely. This area includes gender issues, empowerment, participation and accountability.

There are four major focus areas for water security and its outcomes. It is about using water to increase economic and social welfare, move towards long-term sustainability or reduce risks tied to water. Decision makers and water managers must consider the linkages and trade-offs between the varied types of outcomes.

Improving water security is a key factor to achieve growth, development that is sustainable and reduce poverty. Water security is also about social justice and fair distribution of environmental benefits and harms. Development that is sustainable can help reduce poverty and increase living standards. This is most likely to benefit those affected by the impacts of insecure water resources in the region, especially women and children.

Water security is important for attaining most of the 17 United Nations Sustainable Development Goals (SDGs). This is because access to adequate and safe water is a precondition for meeting many of the individual goals. It is also important for attaining development that is resilient to climate change. Planners take note of water security outcomes for various groups in society when they design strategies for climate change adaptation.

== Determining factors ==
Three main factors determine the ability of a society to sustain water security:

1. Hydrologic environment
2. Socio-economic environment
3. Changes in the future environment (due to the effects of climate change)

=== Hydrologic environment ===
The hydrologic environment is important for water security. The term hydrologic environment refers to the "absolute level of water resource availability". But it also refers to how much it varies in time and location. Inter-annual means from one year to the next, Intra-annual means from one season to the next. It is possible to refer to location as spatial distribution. Scholars distinguish between a hydrologic environment that is easy to manage and one that is difficult.

An easy to manage hydrologic environment would be one with low rainfall variability. In this case rain is distributed throughout the year and perennial river flows sustained by groundwater base flows. For example, many of the world's industrialized nations have a hydrologic environment that they can manage quite easily. This has helped them achieve water security early in their development.

A difficult to manage hydrologic environment is one with absolute water scarcity such as deserts or low-lying lands prone to severe flood risk. Regions where rainfall is very variable from one season to the next, or regions where rainfall varies a lot from one year to the next are also likely to face water security challenges. The term for this is high inter-annual climate variability. An example would be East Africa, where there have been prolonged droughts every two to three years since 1999. Most of the world's developing countries have challenges in managing hydrologies and have not achieved water security. This is not a coincidence.

The poverty and hydrology hypothesis states that regions with a difficult hydrology remain poor because the respective governments have not been able to make the large investments necessary to achieve water security. Examples of such regions would be those with rainfall variability within one year and across several years. This leads to water insecurity which constrains economic growth. There is a statistical link between increased changes in rainfall patterns and lower per capita incomes.

=== Socio-economic environment ===
Relative levels of economic development and equality or inequality are strong determinants of community and household scale water security. Whilst the poverty and hydrology hypothesis suggests that there is a link between poverty and difficult hydrologies, there are many examples of "difficult hydrologies" that have not (yet) resulted in poverty and water insecurity.

Social and economic inequalities are strong drivers of water insecurity, especially at the community and household scales. Gender, race and caste inequalities have all been linked to differential access to water services such as drinking water and sanitation. In particular women and girls frequently have less access to economic and social opportunities as a directly consequence of being primarily responsible for meeting household water needs. The entire journey from water source to point of use is fraught with hazards largely faced by women and girls. There is strong evidence that improving access to water and sanitation is a good way of addressing such inequalities.

=== Climate change ===
Impacts of climate change that are tied to water, affect people's water security on a daily basis. They include more frequent and intense heavy precipitation which affects the frequency, size and timing of floods. Also droughts can alter the total amount of freshwater and cause a decline in groundwater storage, and reduction in groundwater recharge. Reduction in water quality due to extreme events can also occur.^{: 558} Faster melting of glaciers can also occur.

Global climate change will probably make it more complex and expensive to ensure water security. It creates new threats and adaptation challenges. This is because climate change leads to increased hydrological variability and extremes. Climate change has many impacts on the water cycle. These result in higher climatic and hydrological variability, which can threaten water security. Changes in the water cycle threaten existing and future water infrastructure. It will be harder to plan investments for future water infrastructure as there are so many uncertainties about future variability for the water cycle. This makes societies more exposed to risks of extreme events linked to water and therefore reduces water security.

It is difficult to predict the effects of climate change on national and local levels. Water security will be affected by sea level rise in low lying coastal areas while populations dependent on snowmelt as their water source will be affected by the recession of glaciers and mountain snow.

Future climate change must be viewed in context of other existing challenges for water security. Other challenges existing climate variability in areas closer to the equator, population growth and increased demand for water resources. Others include political challenges, increased disaster exposure due to settlement in hazard-prone areas, and environmental degradation. Water demand for irrigation in agriculture will increase due to climate change. This is because evaporation rates and the rate of water loss from crops will be higher due to rising temperatures.

Climate factors have a major effect on water security as various levels. Geographic variability in water availability, reliability of rainfall and vulnerability to droughts, floods and cyclones are inherent hazards that affect development opportunities. These play out at international to intra-basin scales. At local scales, social vulnerability is a factor that increases the risks to water security, no matter the cause. For example, people affected by poverty may have less ability to cope with climate shocks.

== Challenges and threats ==
There are many factors that contribute to low water security. Some examples are:

- Water scarcity: Water demand exceeds supply in many regions of the world. This can be due to population growth, higher living standards, general economic expansion and/or greater quantities of water used in agriculture for irrigation.
- Increasing water pollution and low levels of wastewater treatment, which is making local water unusable.
- Poor planning of water use, poor water management and misuse. These can cause groundwater levels to drop, rivers and lakes to dry out, and local ecosystems to collapse.
- Trans-boundary waters and international rivers which belong to several countries. Country borders often do not align with natural watersheds. One reason is that international borders result from boundaries during colonialism.
- Climate change. This makes water-related disasters such as droughts and floods more frequent and intense; rising temperatures and sea levels can contaminate freshwater sources.

=== Water scarcity ===
A major threat to water security is water scarcity. About 27% of the world's population lived in areas affected by water scarcity in the mid-2010s. This number will likely increase to 42% by 2050.

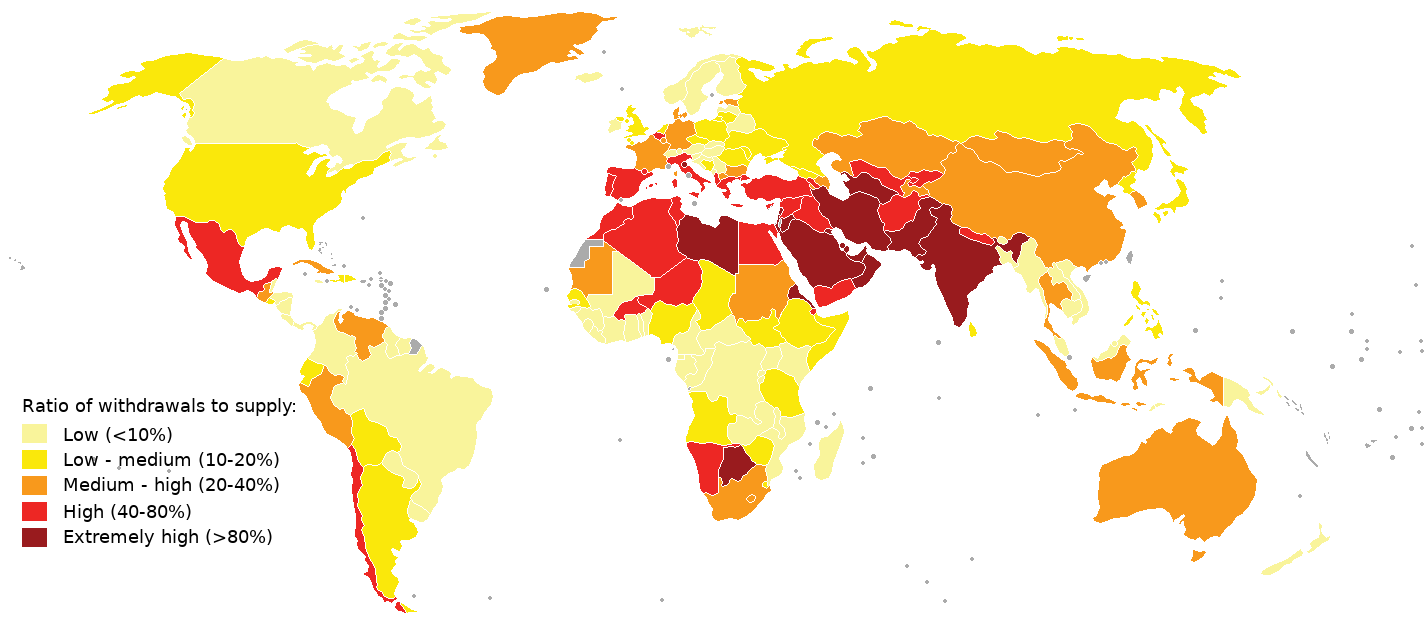
Map of global water stress (a symptom of water scarcity) in 2019. Water stress is the ratio of water use relative to water availability and is therefore a demand-driven scarcity.

Water scarcity (closely related to water stress or water crisis) is the lack of any, local or economically viably transportable, sources of fresh water resources to meet the standard water demand in a region. There are two types of water scarcity. One is physical. The other is economic water scarcity. Physical water scarcity is where there is not enough water to meet all demands. This includes water needed for ecosystems to function. Regions with a desert climate often face physical water scarcity. Central Asia, West Asia, North Africa, and most of Australia are examples of arid areas. Economic water scarcity results from a lack of investment in infrastructure or technology to draw usable water from rivers, aquifers, and other water sources. It also results from weak human capacity to meet water demand. Many people in sub-Saharan Africa are living with economic water scarcity.

There is and has always been enough physical supply of freshwater for current or near or distant future demand in a global scale. As such, water scarcity is caused by a mismatch between when and where people need water, and when and where it is available. This can happen due to an increase in the number of people in a region, changing living conditions and diets, and expansion of irrigated agriculture. Climate change (including droughts or floods), deforestation, water pollution and wasteful use of water can also mean there is not enough water. These variations in scarcity may also be a function of prevailing economic policy and planning approaches.

=== Water pollution ===
Water pollution is a threat to water security. It can affect the supply of drinking water and indirectly contribute to water scarcity.

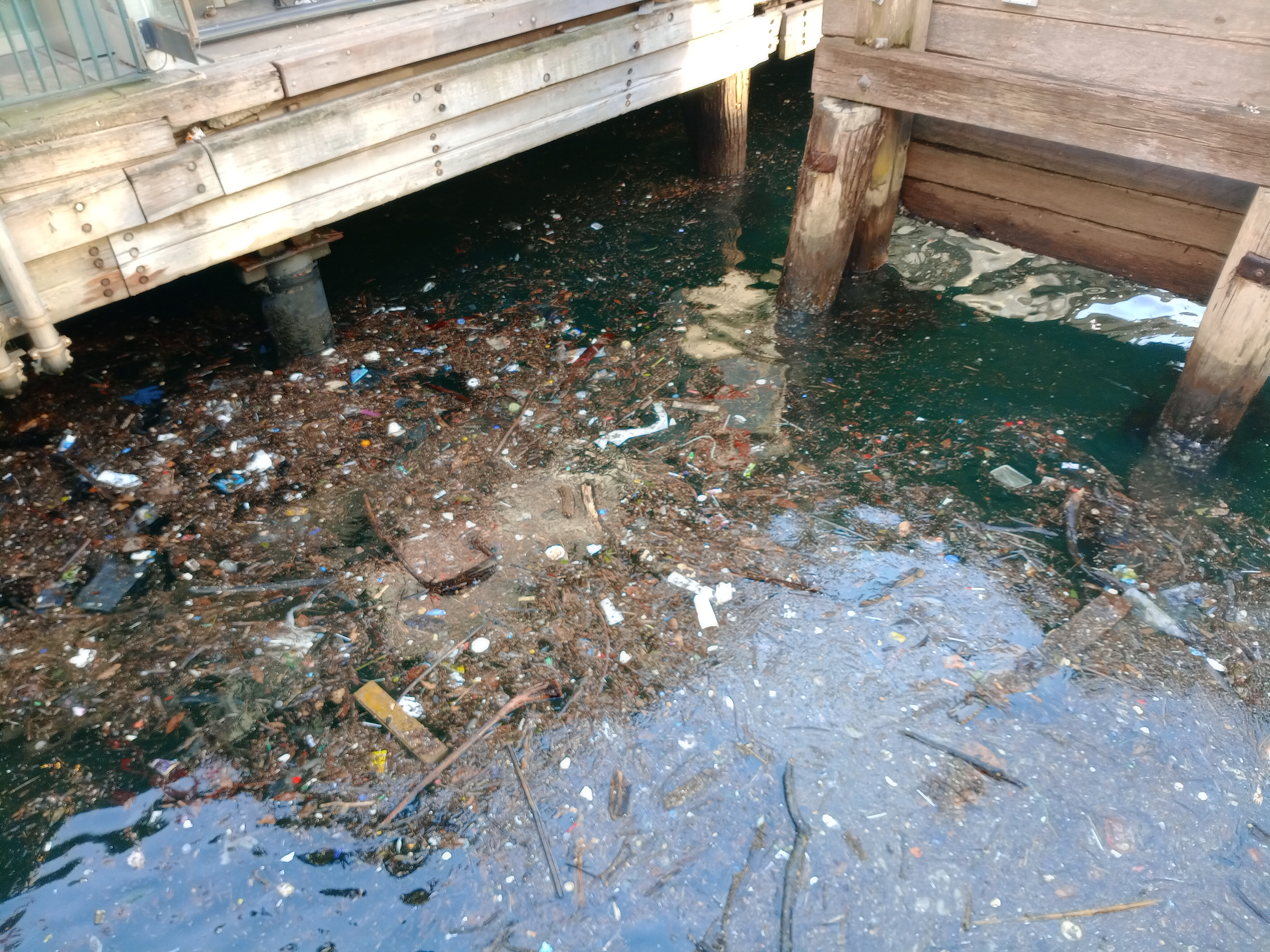
Garbage floating in water, Circular Quay, Sydney, Australia

Water pollution (or aquatic pollution) is the contamination of water bodies, which has a negative impact on how they can be used. It is usually caused by human activities. Water bodies include lakes, rivers, oceans, aquifers, reservoirs and groundwater. Water pollution results when contaminants mix with these water bodies. Contaminants can come from one of four main sources. These are sewage discharges, industrial activities, agricultural activities, and urban runoff including stormwater. Water pollution may affect either surface water or groundwater. This form of pollution can lead to many problems. One is the degradation of aquatic ecosystems. Another is spreading water-borne diseases when people use polluted water for drinking or irrigation. Water pollution also reduces the ecosystem services such as drinking water provided by the water resource.

=== Reduced water quality due to climate change ===
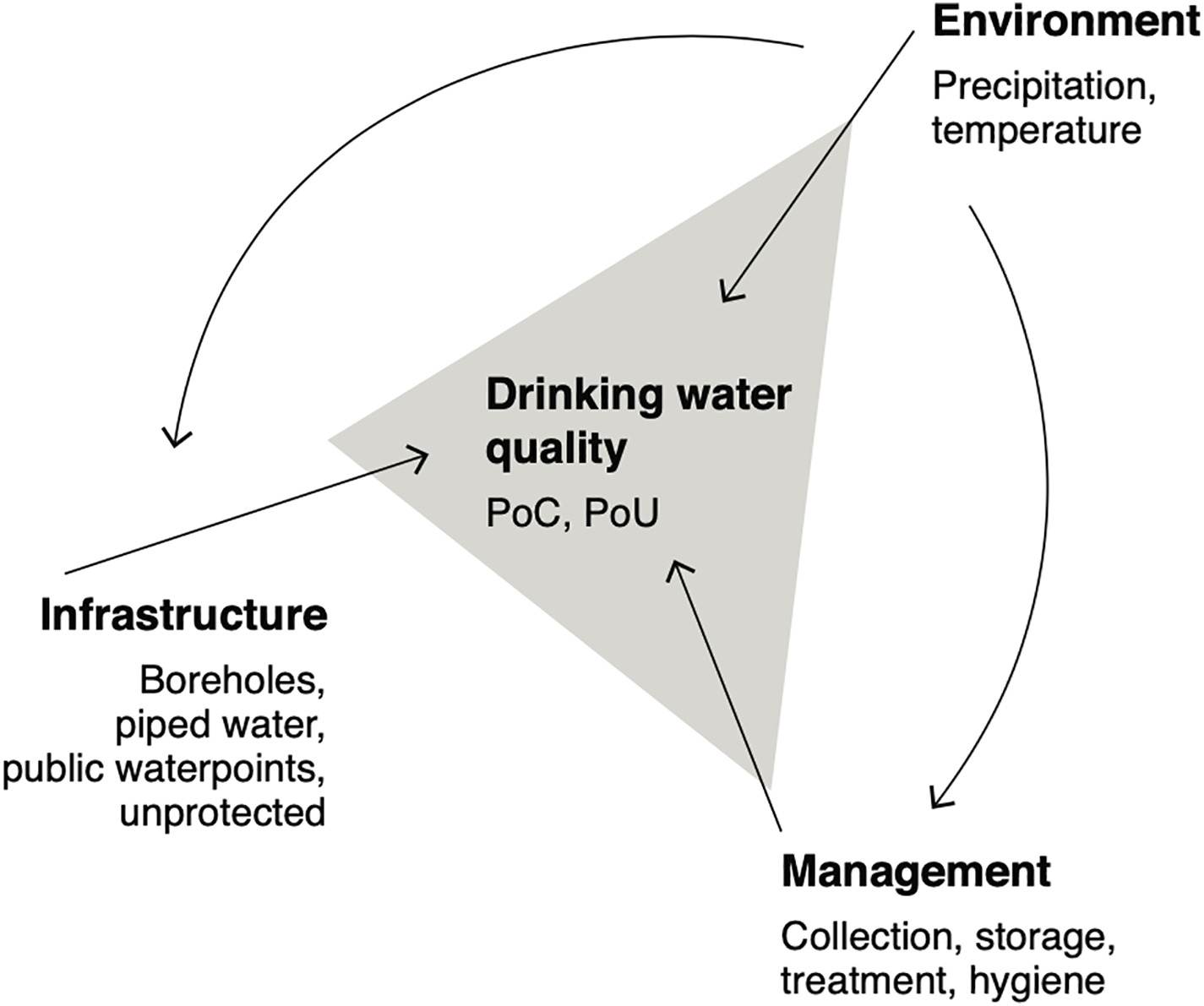
Drinking water quality framework: Environment (including weather events), infrastructure and management affect drinking water quality at the point of collection (PoC) and point of use (PoU).

Weather and its related shocks can affect water quality in several ways. These depend on the local climate and context. Shocks that are linked to weather include water shortages, heavy rain and temperature extremes. They can damage water infrastructure through erosion under heavy rainfall and floods, cause loss of water sources in droughts, and make water quality deteriorate.

Climate change can reduce lower water quality in several ways:

- Heavy rainfall can rapidly reduce the water quality in rivers and shallow groundwater. It can affect water quality in reservoirs even if these effects can be slow. Heavy rainfall also impacts groundwater in deeper, unfractured aquifers. But these impacts are less pronounced. Rainfall can increase fecal contamination of water sources.
- Floods after heavy rainfalls can mix floodwater with wastewater. Also pollutants can reach water bodies by increased surface runoff.
- Groundwater quality may deteriorate due to droughts. The pollution in rivers that feed groundwater becomes less diluted. As groundwater levels drop, rivers may lose direct contact with groundwater.
- In coastal regions, more saltwater may mix into freshwater aquifers due to sea level rise and more intense storms. This process is called saltwater intrusion.
- Warmer water in lakes, oceans, reservoirs and rivers can cause more eutrophication. This results in more frequent harmful algal blooms. Higher temperatures cause problems for water bodies and aquatic ecosystems because warmer water contains less oxygen.
- Permafrost thawing leads to an increased flux of contaminants.
- Increased meltwater from glaciers may release contaminants. As glaciers shrink or disappear, the positive effect of seasonal meltwater on downstream water quality through dilution is disappearing.

=== Poverty ===
People in low-income countries are at greater risk of water insecurity and may also have less resources to mitigate it. This can result in human suffering, sustained poverty, constrained growth and social unrest.

=== Destructive forces of water ===
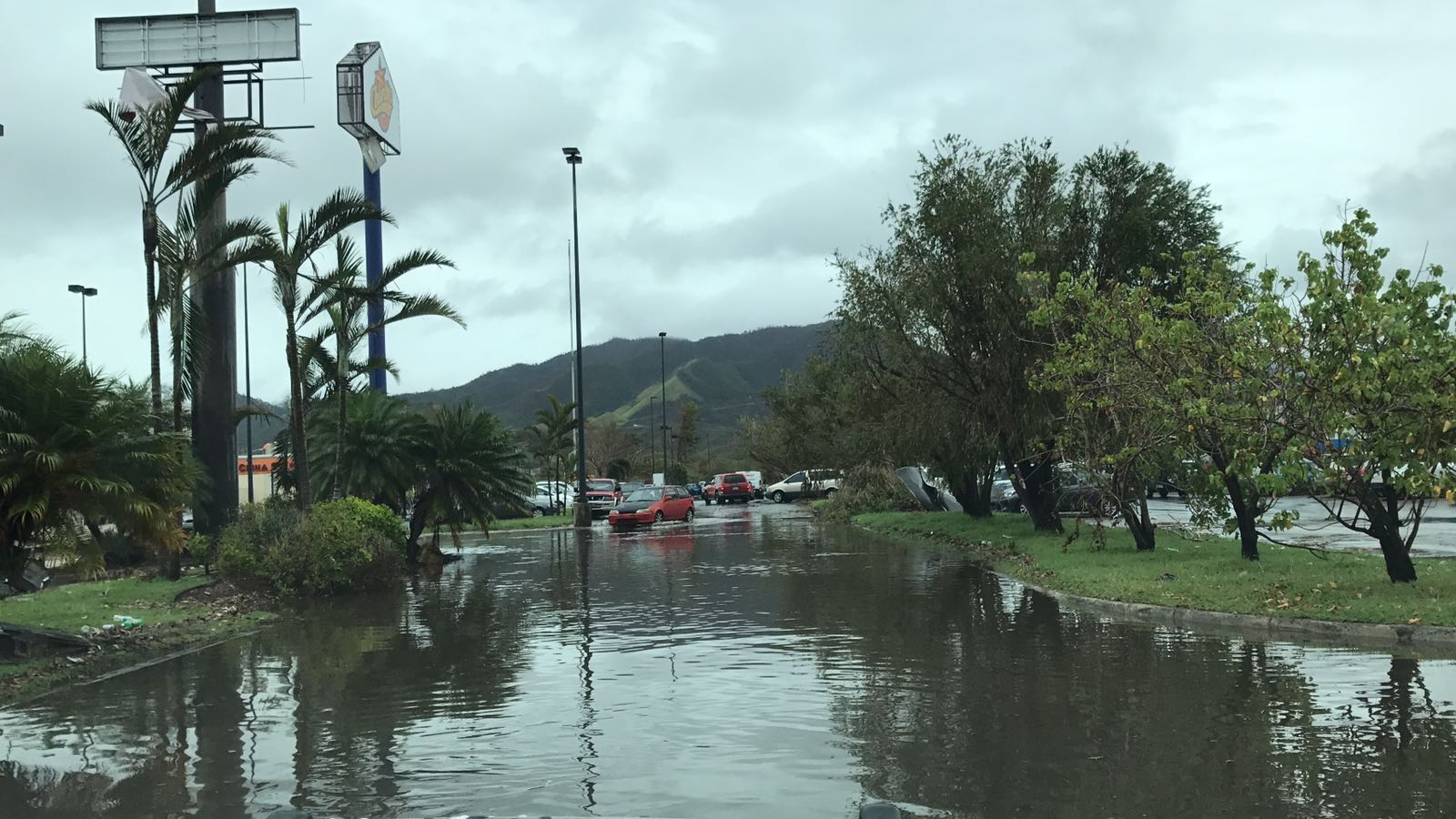
Flooded roads in Ponce, Puerto Rico, a week after Hurricane Maria devastated the island (2017).

Water can cause large-scale destruction due to its huge power. This destruction can result from sudden events. Examples are tsunamis, floods or landslides. Events that happen slowly over time such as erosion, desertification or water pollution can also cause destruction.

=== Other threats ===
Other threats to water security include:

- Disasters caused by natural hazards such as hurricanes, earthquakes, and wildfires. These can damage man-made structures such as dams and fill waterways with debris;
- Some climate change mitigation measures which need a lot of water. Bioenergy with carbon capture and storage, afforestation and reforestation may use relatively large amounts of water if done at inappropriate locations. The term for this is a high water footprint.
- Terrorism such as water supply terrorism;
- Radiation due to a nuclear accident;
- New water uses such as hydraulic fracturing for energy resources;
- Armed conflict and migration. Migration can be due to water scarcity at the origin or it can lead to more water scarcity at the target destinations.

== Management approaches ==
There are different ways to tackle water insecurity. Science and engineering approaches can increase the water supply or make water use more efficient. Financial and economic tools can be used as a safety net for poorer people. Higher prices may encourage more investments in water systems. Finally, management tools such as demand caps can improve water security. Decision makers invest in institutions, information flows and infrastructure to achieve a high level of water security.

=== Investment decisions ===
==== Institutions ====
The right institutions are important to improve water security. Institutions govern how decisions can promote or constrain water security outcomes for the poor. Strengthening institutions might involve reallocating risks and duties between the state, market and communities in new ways. This can include performance-based models, development impact bonds, or blended finance from government, donors and users. These finance mechanisms are set up to work jointly with state, private sector and communities investors.

Sustainable Development Goal 16 is about peace, justice and strong institutions. It recognizes that strong institutions are a necessary condition for sustainable development, including water security.

Drinking water quality and water pollution are linked. But policymakers often do not address them in a comprehensive way. For example, pollution from industries is often not linked to drinking water quality in developing countries. Keeping track of river, groundwater and wastewater is important. It can identify sources of contamination and guide targeted regulatory responses. The WHO has described water safety plans as the most effective means of maintaining a safe supply of drinking water to the public.

==== Information flows ====
It is important for institutions to have access to information about water. This helps them with their planning and decision-making. It also helps with tracking how accountable and effective policies are. Investments into climate information tools that are appropriate for the local context are useful. They cover a wide range of temporal and spatial scales. They also respond to regional climate risks tied to water.

Seasonal climate and hydrological forecasts can be useful to prepare for and reduce water security risks. They are especially useful if people can apply them at the local scale. Applying knowledge of how climate anomalies relate to each other over long distances can improve seasonal forecasts for specific regions. These teleconnections are correlations between patterns of rainfall, temperature, and wind speed between distant areas. They are caused by large-scale ocean and atmospheric circulation.

In regions where rainfall varies with the seasons and from year to year, water managers would like to have more accurate seasonal weather forecasts. In some locations the onset of seasonal rainfall is particularly hard to predict. This is because aspects of the climate system are difficult to describe with mathematical models. For example, the long rains in East Africa which fall March to May have been difficult to simulate with climate models. When climate models work well they can produce useful seasonal forecasts. One reason for these difficulties is the complex topography of the area. Improved understanding of atmospheric processes may allow climate scientists to provide more relevant and localized information to water managers on a seasonal timescale. They could also provide more detailed predictions for the effects of climate change on a longer timeframe.

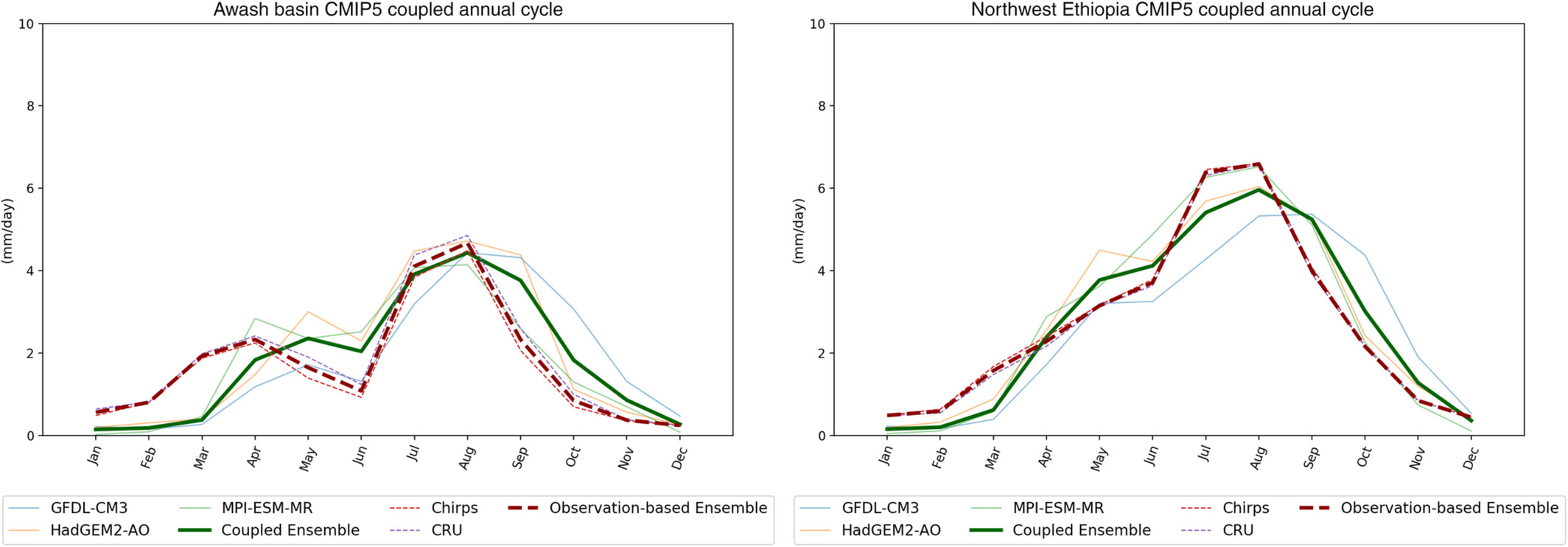
Annual rainfall pattern in two regions of Ethiopia. The lines represent observations (red dashed line) and model results (green line) in a climate model study of the region.

One example would be seasonal forecasts of rainfall in Ethiopia's Awash river basin. These may become more accurate by understanding better how sea surface temperatures in different ocean regions relate to rainfall patterns in this river basin. At a larger regional scale, a better understanding of the relationship between pressure systems in the Indian Ocean and the South Atlantic on the one hand, and wind speeds and rainfall patterns in the Greater Horn of Africa on the other hand would be helpful. This kind of scientific analysis may contribute to improved representation of this region in climate models to assist development planning. It could also guide people when they plan water allocation in the river basin or prepare emergency response plans for future events of water scarcity and flooding.

==== Infrastructure ====
Water infrastructure serves to access, store, regulate, move and conserve water. Several assets carry out these functions. Natural assets are lakes, rivers, wetlands, aquifers, springs. Engineered assets are bulk water management infrastructure, such as dams. Examples include:

- Improved water storage: using natural water storage systems such as aquifers and wetlands or built infrastructure such as storage tanks and dams.
- Using new water sources to add to the existing water supplies. This can be done through water reuse, desalination, rainwater harvesting and groundwater pumping.
- Embankments (or levee or dike) for flood protection.

Public and private spending on water infrastructure and supporting institutions must be well balanced. They are likely to evolve over time. This is important to avoid unplanned social and environmental costs from building new facilities.

For example, in the case of Africa, investments into groundwater use is an option to increase water security and for climate change adaptation. Water security in African countries could benefit from the distribution of groundwater storage and recharge on the continent. Recharge is a process where water moves to groundwater. Many countries that have low recharge have substantial groundwater storage. Countries with low storage typically have high, regular recharge.

=== Consideration of scales ===
People manage water security risks at different spatial scales. These range from the household to community, town, city, basin and region. At the local scale, actors include county governments, schools, water user groups, local water providers and the private sector. At the next larger scale there are basin and national level actors. These actors help to identify any constraints with regards to policy, institutions and investments. Lastly, there are global actors such as the World Bank, UNICEF, FCDO, WHO and USAID. They help to develop suitable service delivery models.

The physical geography of a country shows the correct scale that planners should use for managing water security risks. Even within a country, the hydrologic environment may vary a lot. See for example the variations in seasonal rainfall across Ethiopia.

=== Reducing inequalities in water security ===
Inequalities with regards to water security within a society have structural and historical roots. They can affect people at different scales. These range from the household, to the community, town, river basin or the region. High risk social groups and regions can be identified during political debates but are often ignored. Water inequality is often tied to gender in low-income countries. At the household level, women are often the "water managers". But they have limited choices over water and related issues.

=== Improving climate resilience of water and sanitation services ===
Many institutions are working to develop WASH services that are resilient to climate.

Climate-resilient water services (or climate-resilient WASH) are services that provide access to high quality drinking water during all seasons and even during extreme weather events. Climate resilience in general is the ability to recover from, or to mitigate vulnerability to, climate-related shocks such as floods and droughts. Climate resilient development has become the new paradigm for sustainable development. This concept thus influences theory and practice across all sectors globally. This is particularly true in the water sector, since water security is closely connected to climate change. On every continent, governments are now adopting policies for climate resilient economies. International frameworks such as the Paris Agreement and the Sustainable Development Goals are drivers for such initiatives.

Several activities can improve water security and increase resilience to climate risks: Carrying out a detailed analysis of climate risk to make climate information relevant to specific users; developing metrics for monitoring climate resilience in water systems (this will help to track progress and guide investments for water security); and using new institutional models that improve water security.

Climate resilient policies can be useful for allocating water, especially when regional water availability may change in future. This requires a good understanding of the current and future hydroclimatic situation. For example, a more accurate prediction of future changes in climate variability leads to a better response to their possible impacts.

To build climate resilience into water systems, people need to have access to climate information that is appropriate for their local context. Climate information products are useful if they cover a wide range of temporal and spatial scales, and provide information on regional water-related climate risks. For example, government staff need easy access to climate information to achieve better water management.

Four important activities to achieve climate resilient WASH services include: First, a risk analysis is performed to look at possible implications of extreme weather events as well as preventive actions. Such preventive actions can include for example elevating the infrastructure to be above expected flood levels. Secondly, managers assess the scope for reducing greenhouse gas emissions and put in place suitable options, e.g. using more renewable energy sources. Thirdly, the water utilities ensure that water sources and sanitation services are reliable at all times during the year, also during times of droughts and floods. Finally, the management and service delivery models are strengthened so that they can withstand a crisis.

To put climate resilience into practice and to engage better with politicians, the following guide questions are useful: "resilience of what, to what, for whom, over what time frame, by whom and at what scale?". For example, "resilience of what?" means thinking beyond infrastructure but to also include resilience of water resources, local institutions and water users. Another example is that "resilience for whom?" speaks about reducing vulnerability and preventing negative developments: Some top-down interventions that work around power and politics may undermine indigenous knowledge and compromise community resilience.

== Measurement tools ==
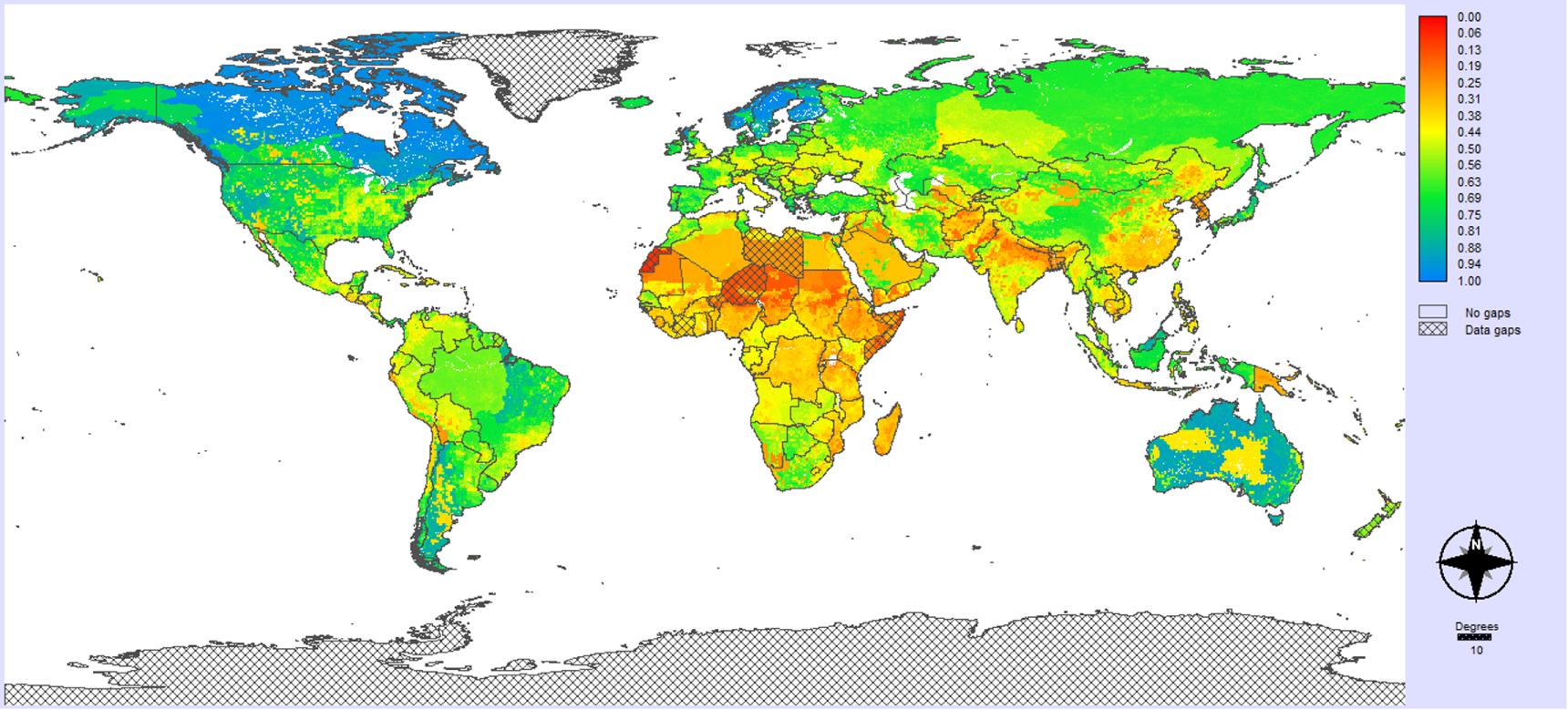
Aggregated global water security index, calculated using the aggregation of water availability, accessibility, safety and quality, and management indices. The value '0–1' (with the continuous color 'red to blue') represents 'low to high' security.

There is no single way to measure water security. There are no standard indicators to measure water security. That is because it is a concept that focuses on outcomes. The outcomes that are regard as important can change depending on the context and stakeholders.

Instead, it is common to compare relative levels of water security by using metrics for certain aspects of water security. For example, the Global Water Security Index includes metrics on:

- availability (water scarcity index, drought index, groundwater depletion);
- accessibility to water services (access to sanitation and drinking water);
- safety and quality (water quality index, global flood frequency);
- management (World Governance Index, transboundary legal framework, transboundary political tension).

Scientists have been working on ways to measure water security at a variety of levels. The metrics roughly fall into two groups. There are those that are based on experiences versus metrics that are based on resources. The former mainly focus on measuring the experiences of households and human well-being. Meanwhile the latter focuses on the amount of available freshwater.

The Household Water Insecurity Experiences (HWISE) Scale measures several components of water insecurity at the household level. These include adequacy, reliability, accessibility and safety. This scale can help to identify vulnerable subpopulations and ensure resources are allocated to those in need. It can also measure how effective of water policies and projects are.

== Global estimates ==
The IPCC Sixth Assessment Report summarises the current and future water security trends. It says that increasing weather and extreme climate events have led to acute food insecurity and reduced water security for millions of people. The largest impacts are seen in Africa, Asia, Central and South America, Small Islands and the Arctic.

The same report predicted that global warming of 2 °C would expose roughly 1–4 billion people to water stress. This would depend on regional patterns of climate change and the socio-economic scenarios. On water scarcity which is one factor in water insecurity the report finds 1.5–2.5 billion people live water scarce areas.

Water scarcity and water security are not always equal. There are regions with high water security even though they also experience water scarcity. Examples are parts of the United States, Australia and Southern Europe. This is due to efficient water services that have a high level of safety, quality, and accessibility. However, even in those regions, groups such as Indigenous peoples tend to have less access to water and face water insecurity at times.

== Country examples ==
=== Bangladesh ===
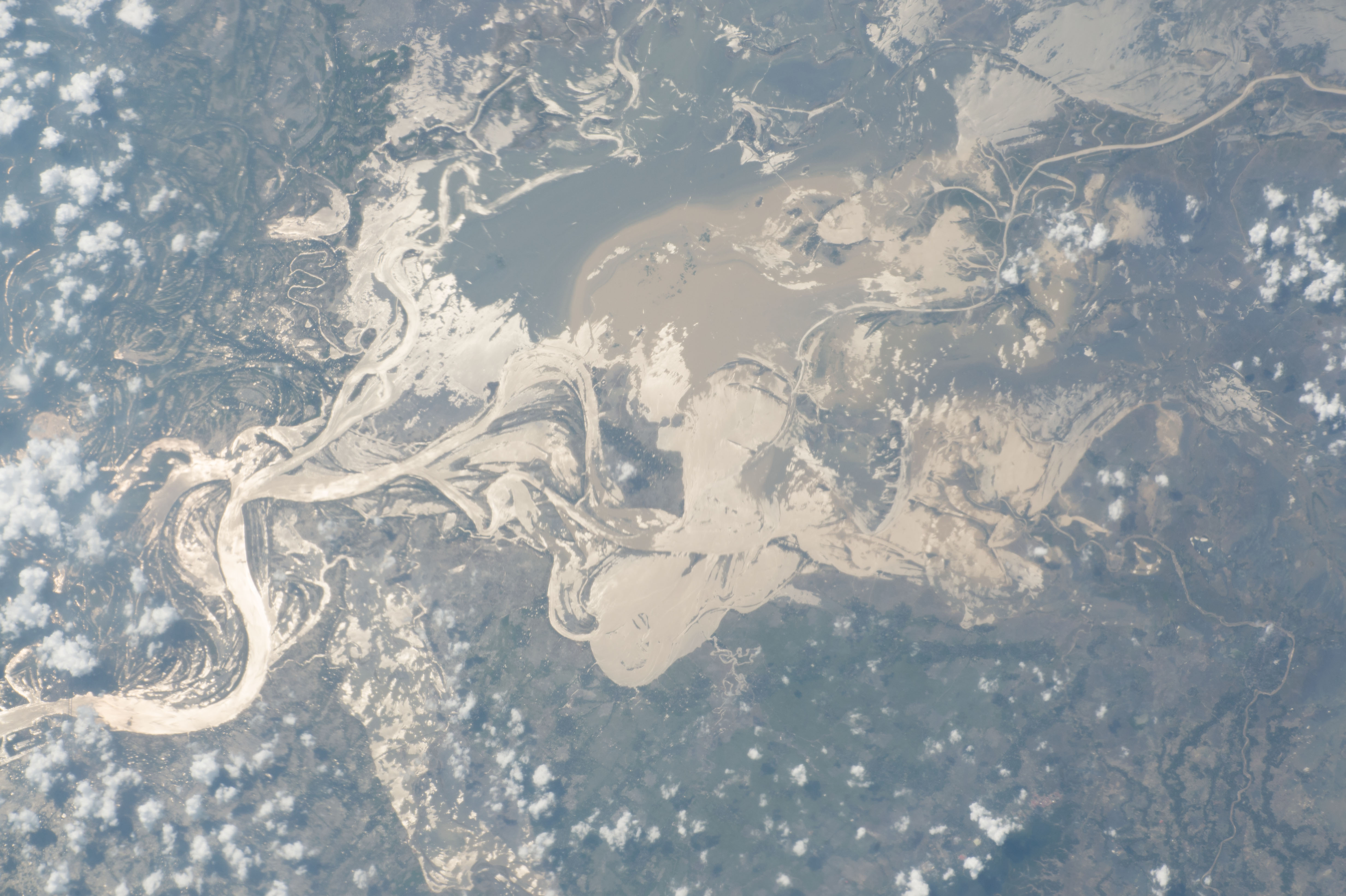
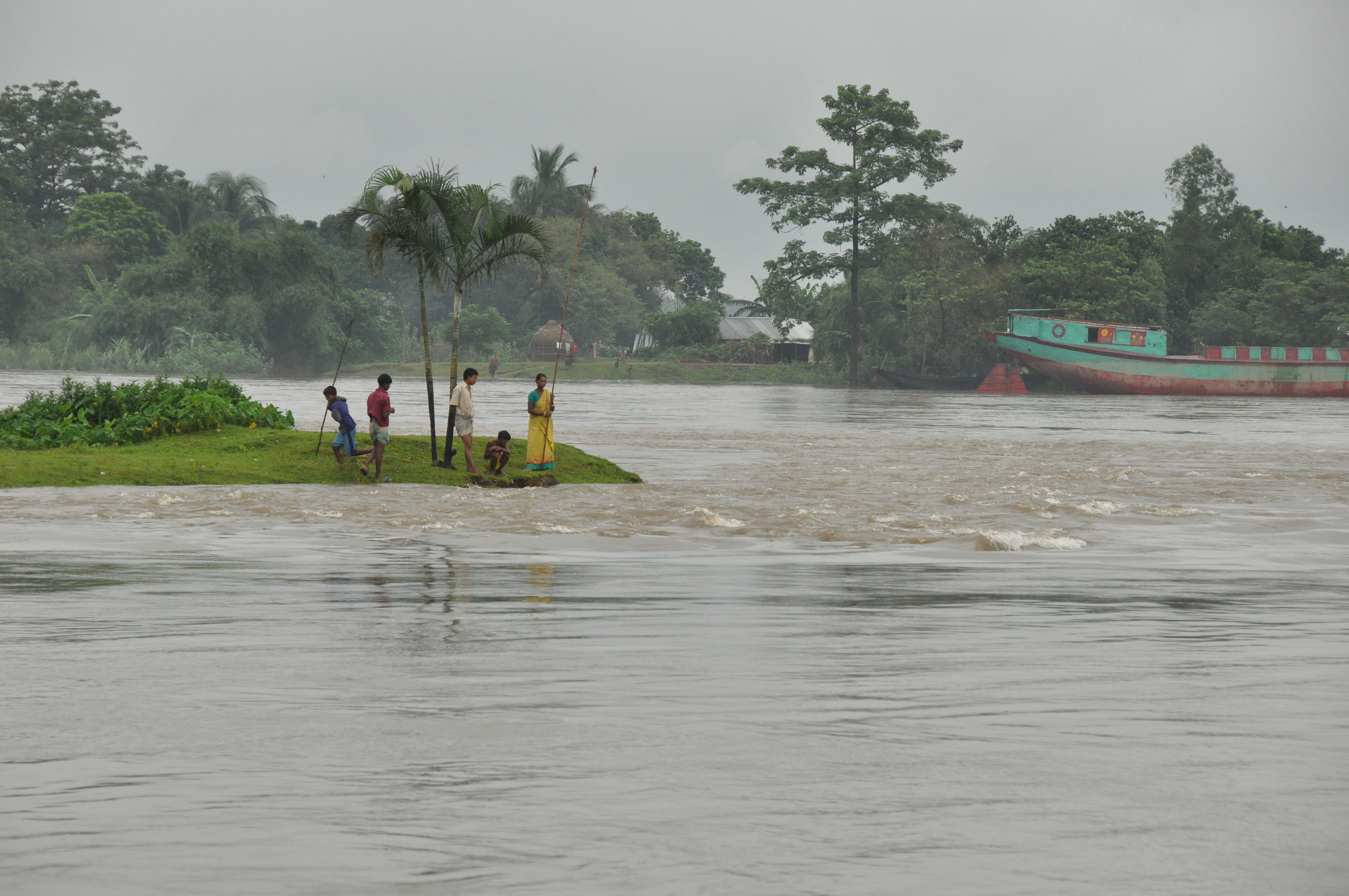
Too much water can also cause water insecurity. Left: Flooding in Bangladesh; right: People on an island in a flooded river in Bangladesh.

Risks to water security in Bangladesh include:

- natural hazards that related to the climate (climate hazards)
- some impacts of urbanization
- impacts from climate change such as changes to precipitation patterns and sea level rise.

The country experiences water security risks in the capital Dhaka as well as in the coastal region. In Dhaka, monsoonal pulses can lead to urban flooding. This can pollute the water supply. A number of processes and events cause water risks for about 20 million people in the coastal regions. These include aquifers that are getting saltier, seasonal water scarcity, fecal contamination, and flooding from the monsoon and from storm surges due to cyclones.

Different types of floods occur in coastal Bangladesh. They are: river floods, tidal floods and storm surge floods due to tropical cyclones. These floods can damage drinking water infrastructure. They can also lead to reduced water quality as well as losses in agricultural and fishery yields. There is a link between water insecurity and poverty in the low-lying areas in the Ganges-Brahmaputra tidal delta plain. Those low-lying areas are embanked areas in coastal Bangladesh.

The government has various programs to reduce risks for people who live in coastal communities. These programs also lead to increases in economic wellbeing. Examples include the "Coastal Embankment Improvement Project" by World Bank in 2013, the BlueGold project in 2012, UNICEF's "Managed Aquifer Recharge" program in 2014 and the Bangladesh Delta Plan in 2014. Such investments in water security aim to increase the continued use and upkeep of water facilities. They can help coastal communities to escape the poverty trap caused by water insecurity.

A program called the "SafePani framework" focuses on how the state shares risks and responsibilities with service providers and communities. This program aims to help decision makers to address climate risks through a process called climate resilient water safety planning. The program is a cooperation between UNICEF and the Government of Bangladesh.

=== Ethiopia ===
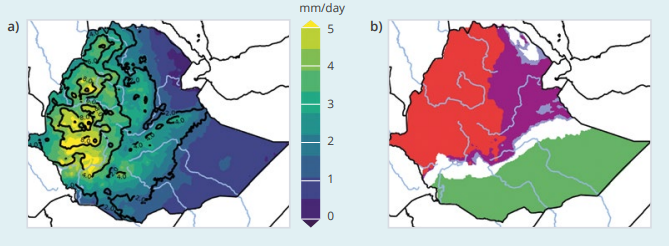
Rainfall regimes vary across Ethiopia. Left figure: Annual average rainfall in mm/day with the interquartile range (25th–75th) of monthly rainfall in mm/day indicated by black contours (1981–2020). Right figure: Three rainfall zones in Ethiopia with different seasonal rainfall patterns. The green zone has two separate rainy seasons, and the red zone has a single peak in rainfall in Jun to September.

Ethiopia has two main wet seasons per year. It rains in the spring and summer. These seasonal patterns of rainfall vary a lot across the country. Western Ethiopia has a seasonal rainfall pattern that is similar to the Sahel. It has rainfall from February to November (which is decreasing to the north), and has peak rainfall from June to September. Southern Ethiopia has a rainfall pattern similar to the one in East Africa. There are two distinct wet seasons every year, February to May, and October to November. Central and eastern Ethiopia has some rainfall between February and November, with a smaller peak in rainfall from March to May and a second higher peak from June to September.

In 2022 Ethiopia had one of the most severe La Niña-induced droughts in the last forty years. It came about due to four consecutive rainy seasons which did not produce enough rain. This drought increased water insecurity for more than 8 million pastoralists and agro-pastoralists in the Somali, Oromia, SNNP and South-West regions. About 7.2 million people needed food aid, and 4.4 million people needed help to access water. Food prices have increased a lot due to the drought conditions. Many people in the affected area have experienced food shortages due to the water insecurity situation.

In the Awash basin in central Ethiopia floods and droughts are common. Agriculture in the basin is mainly rainfed (without irrigation systems). This applies to around 98% of total cropland as of 2012. So changes in rainfall patterns due to climate change will reduce economic activities in the basin. Rainfall shocks have a direct impact on agriculture. A rainfall decrease in the Awash basin could lead to a 5% decline in the basin's overall GDP. The agricultural GDP could even drop by as much as 10%.

Partnerships with the Awash Basin Development Office (AwBDO) and the Ministry of Water, Irrigation and Electricity (MoWIE) have led to the development of new models of water allocation in the Awash basin. This can improve water security for the 18.3 million residents in the basin. With this they will have enough water for their domestic, irrigation and industry needs.

=== Kenya ===
Kenya ranked 46th out of 54 African countries in an assessment of water security in 2022. Major water security issues in Kenya include drinking water safety, water scarcity, lack of water storage, poor wastewater treatment, and drought and flood. Large-scale climate patterns influence the rainfall patterns in East Africa. Such climate patterns include the El Niño–Southern Oscillation (ENSO) and the Indian Ocean Dipole (IOD). Cooling in the Pacific Ocean during the La Niña phase of ENSO is linked with dryer conditions in Kenya. This can lead to drought as it did in 2016–17. On the other hand a warmer Western Indian Ocean due to a strong positive Indian Ocean Dipole caused extreme flooding in Kenya in 2020.

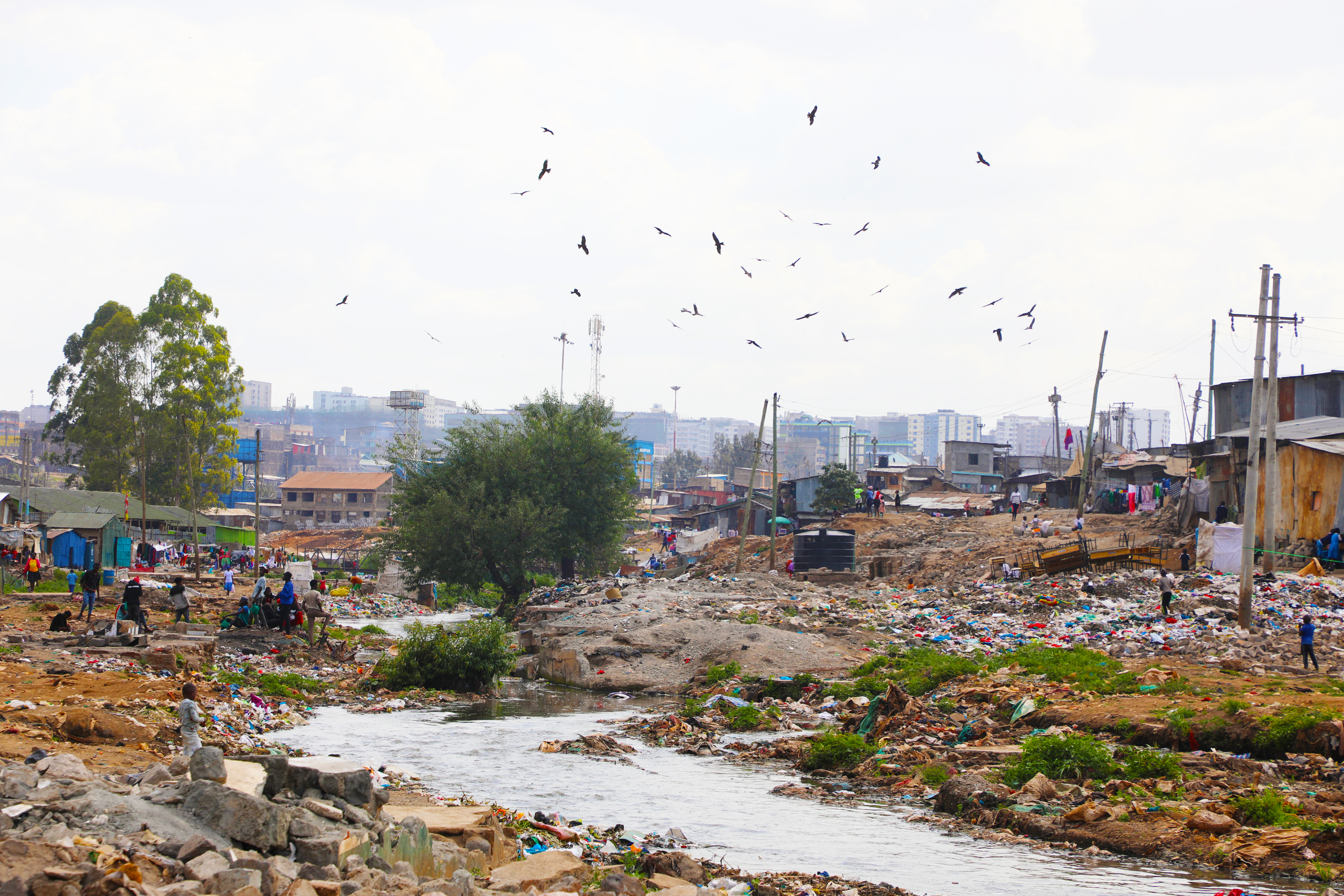
Mathare River- Nairobi, Kenya

Around 38% of Kenya's population and 70% of its livestock live in arid and semi-arid lands. These areas have low rainfall which varies a lot from one season to the next. This means that surface water and groundwater resources vary a lot by location and time of year. Residents in Northern Kenya are seeing increased changes in rainfall patterns and more frequent droughts. These changes affect livelihoods in this region where people have been living as migratory herders. They are used to herding livestock with a seasonal migration pattern. More people are now settling in small urban centers, and there is increasing conflict over water and other resources. Water insecurity is a feature of life for both settled and nomadic pastoralists. Women and children bear the burden for fetching water.

Groundwater sources! have great potential to improve water supply in Kenya. However, the use of groundwater is limited by low quality and knowledge, pumping too much groundwater, known as overdrafting, and salt water intrusion along coastal areas. Another challenge is the upkeep of groundwater infrastructure, mainly in rural areas.

=== Ukraine ===
Russian forces have destroyed one-third of Ukraine's freshwater storage since February 2022 to 2024. Potable, industrial and irrigation water supplies have been cut across the south and east of the country. Occupation of the southern and eastern regions of Ukraine and destruction of the Kakhovka Reservoir have all but terminated irrigation. Irrigated cereals and technical crops are now unprofitable, even where practicable – not least because of the difficulty of selling and exporting the produce. The strategic development of irrigation should be based on optimal technology to minimize water costs and redesign cultivation systems, for example, by drip irrigation, diverse crop rotations and focus on vegetable farming, orchards, and viticulture.

== See also ==
- Global Water Security & Sanitation Partnership – World Bank trust fund
- Human right to water and sanitation
- Water footprint – Extent of water use in relation to consumption by people
- Water security in Australia
- Water security in the United States
