= Farmgate Foot Over Bridge =

Farmgate Foot Overbridge
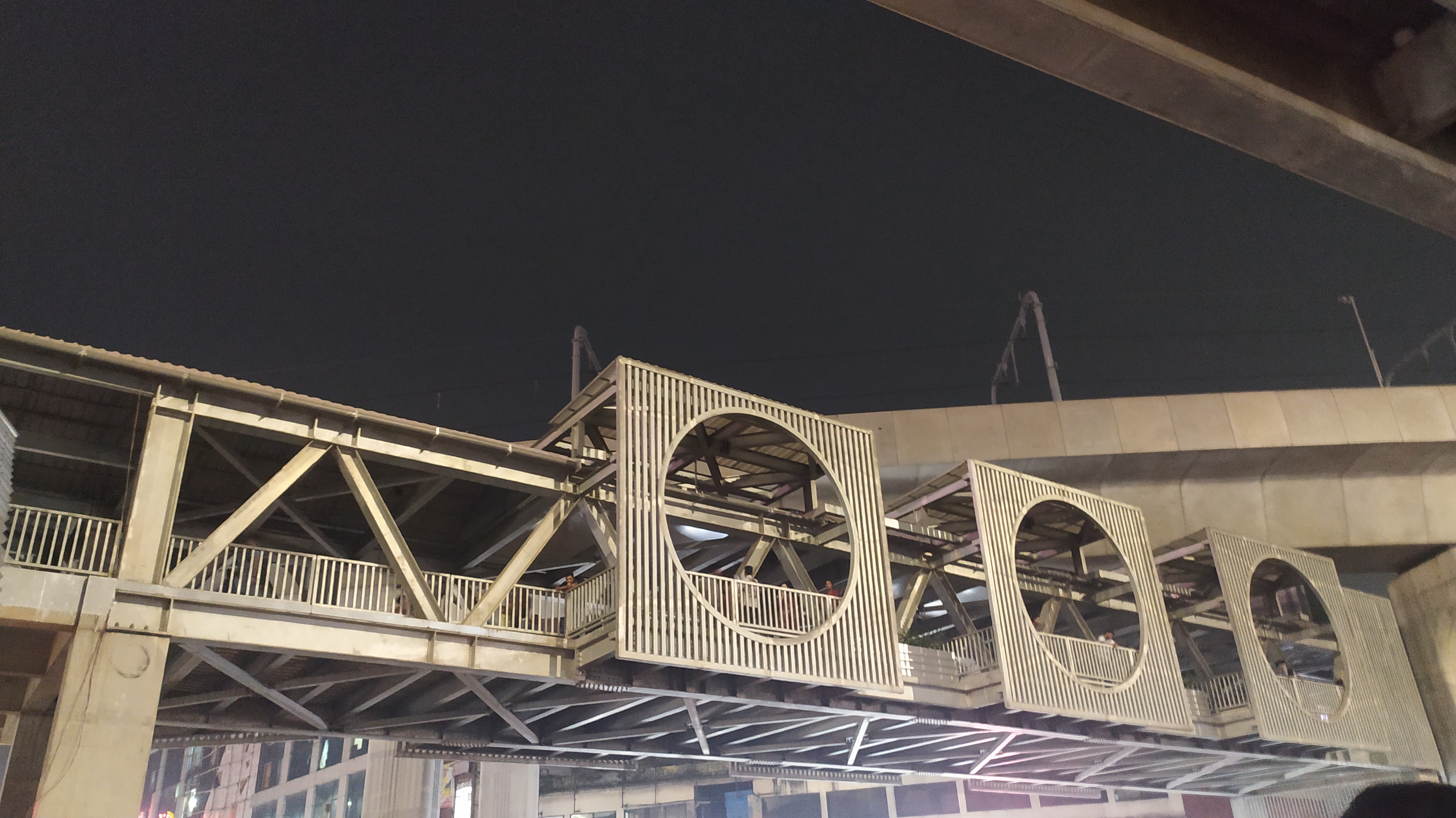
- Farmgate Foot Overbridge
- Locale: Farmgate, Dhaka, Bangladesh

Characteristics
- Design: Jatiya Sangsad Bhaban

History
- Opened: 2023

Statistics
- Toll: No

The Farmgate Foot Overbridge is a pedestrian overpass located in Farmgate, Dhaka, the capital of Bangladesh. It was constructed to facilitate pedestrian movement across one of the busiest intersections in the city, the Farmgate roundabout. Every day, many pedestrians use this bridge.

== History ==
The construction of the foot overbridge began in May 2022. It was built at a cost of approximately 200 million BDT, funded by the Bangladesh Bridge Authority. The bridge was inaugurated on October 15, 2023, by the Minister of Home Affairs, Asaduzzaman Khan. Also present at the event were the Mayor of Dhaka North City Corporation, Atiqul Islam, and chief executive officer Selim Reza.

== Design ==
The foot overbridge was designed to resemble the Jatiya Sangsad Bhaban (National Parliament House). Farmgate marks the beginning of the master plan of Sher-e-Bangla Nagar, designed by architect Louis Kahn. Inspired by his architectural style, the design of the foot overbridge reflects elements of his work.

== Construction ==
The Dhaka Elevated Expressway authorities funded the construction of the foot overbridge with 200 million BDT. The bridge was built under the supervision of Dhaka North City Corporation by the 24th Engineering Brigade of the Bangladesh Army at a cost of approximately 140 million BDT. The foot overbridge, funded by the Bangladesh Bridge Authority, is 206 feet long and 21 feet wide. It features escalators and is monitored by CCTV cameras at all times.
