= Chord line =

Chord line may refer to:

- a straight line connecting the leading and trailing edges of an airfoil
- Chord (geometry), a line segment joining two points on a curve
- Chord (astronomy), a line crossing a foreground astronomical object during an occultation which gives an indication of the objects size and/or shape

Chord Line may also refer to a railway line in India and Bangladesh:

- Chord Line, Tamil Nadu, in Tamil Nadu state
- Grand Chord, a line in the East Central Railway zone
- Howrah–Barddhaman chord line, a section of the Kolkata Suburban Railway
- Narayanganj–Laksam chord line, a proposed railway line in Bangladesh
