= Narayanganj–Laksam chord line =

Proposed railway line in Bangladesh

Narayanganj–Laksam chord

Overview
- Native name: নারায়ণগঞ্জ–লাকসাম কর্ড
- Status: Proposed
- Owner: Ministry of Railways
- Locale: Bangladesh
- Termini: Narayanganj railway station; Laksam Junction railway station
- Stations: 11

Service
- Type: Railway line
- System: Bangladesh Railway

Technical
- Line length: 90 km
- Track gauge: Dual gauge 1,676 mm (5 ft 6 in)
- Operating speed: 70 km/h

Narayanganj–Laksam chord line is a proposed 90km-long dual gauge railway. It will be constructed under the Ministry of Railways, Government of Bangladesh. The line will directly connect Dhaka to Chittagong through Narayanganj, Munshiganj and Comilla District.

== History ==
=== Background ===
The Dhaka State Railway opened the 144-kilometre (89 mi) long metre gauge railway from Narayanganj to Mymensingh via Dhaka in 1884–1885. This line was meant primarily for the collection of jute and its onward dispatch to Kolkata, then known as Calcutta. In response to the demand of the Assam tea planters for a railway link to Chittagong port, Assam Bengal Railway started construction of a railway track on the eastern side of Bengal in 1891. A 150-kilometre-long (93 mi) track between Chittagong and Comilla was opened to traffic in 1895. In an effort to link this line running on the eastern bank of the Meghna with the rail system on the western bank of the river, the Tongi–Akhaura line came up between 1910 and 1914.

To travel Chittagong by train from Dhaka, one have to go through the railway lines of Narayanganj–Bahadurabad Ghat, Tongi–Bhairab–Akhaura and Akhaura–Laksam–Chittagong, so the distance from Dhaka to Chittagong by rail is 324 km. It takes at least 6 hours to travel from Dhaka to Chittagong via the existing route. So a chord line was planned to be constructed two years before the independence of Bangladesh to reduce the distance of this route. According to the survey conducted as per the plan, it was revealed that if a planned chord line is constructed from Dhaka to Laksam, the distance between Dhaka and Chittagong by rail will be reduced by 214 km. The government of Pakistan had budgeted Rs. 26 crore (equivalent to Rs. 1,323 crore or US$4.6 million in 2021) for construction of the proposed chord line. But due to the beginning of the liberation war of Bangladesh and other issues, this project could not be implemented.

=== Development ===
A traffic survey of the chord line was then prepared about five years after the country was liberated. Two routes for the chord line were proposed in that survey. The length of the first proposed route was 110 km and the length of the second route was 90 km. The government of Bangladesh budgeted ৳27.638 crore for its construction. The government conducted a feasibility study for the chord line in the 1980s, but the project stalled after the 1990 Mass Uprising in Bangladesh. Then the Railway Reorganization Reforms Formulation Committee formed during the First Hasina ministry recommended an allocation of ৳900 crore (equivalent to ৳43 billion or US$350 million in 2023) for the chord line in the financial year 1998-1999. During the Third Khaleda ministry in 2006, the government commissioned SM AMEC International Private Limited to carry out another survey for the chord line. In that survey, its budget was pegged at ৳25,800 (equivalent to ৳82,890 in 2023).

In 2015, Mujibul Haque Mujib, the then railway minister of the country, announced the construction of a new line from Narayanganj railway station to Comilla railway station via Daudkandi in Comilla District instead of the previously scheduled route for the chord line, which was scheduled to start the following year but did not start. In 2018, the Third Hasina ministry started work on plans to build the Dhaka–Chittagong high-speed railway on the proposed route of the chord Line, which was criticized by transport experts. But considering the exorbitant cost, the project was shelved and a new feasibility study was started with emphasis on the chord line. On September 25, 2021, Railway Minister Md. Nurul Islam Sujon promised a new plan to construct the chord line, which will reduce the railway distance from Dhaka to Chittagong by 70 km. On January 11, 2023, the Cabinet Committee on Public Procurement gave permission to the Ministry of Railways to undertake a feasibility study and detailed design of the chord line construction project. In November 2023, the consortium responsible for the feasibility study submitted a summary of the study to the government. They proposed four possible route for the chord line. However, the government rejected and terminated the chord line construction project in March 2024.
