= Dhaka Subway =

Planned urban rail in Dhaka, Bangladesh

Overview
- Locale: Dhaka
- Transit type: Rapid transit
- Number of lines: 11 (proposed)

Technical
- System length: 258 km (160 mi)
- Track gauge: Standard gauge

Dhaka Subway is an underground urban rail network being planned in Dhaka, the capital city of Bangladesh, by the Bangladesh Bridge Authority. Dhaka Subway was conceived as a transport system separate from the Dhaka Mass Rapid Transit network, commonly known as Dhaka Metro Rail.

== Background ==
In August 2018, Bangladesh Bridge Authority (BBA) appointed a Spanish consulting company to conduct the feasibility study and preliminary design of Dhaka Subway. The initial plan was to construct a subway network of 90km, consisting of four lines, with stations spaced at an average distance of one kilometer. After some feasibility studies, the project was expanded to cover the entire Dhaka with a total length of 238 kilometers, later revised to 258 kilometers.

A number of geotechnical and geophysical surveys and investigations are to be carried out at a total of 250 locations, with boreholes being drilled at 180 proposed station locations, with seismic CPTu tests to be carried out at intermediate locations between stations. Traffic and transportation surveys, including household interviews, traffic counts, roadside origin/destination surveys, travel time and delay studies, and public transport surveys are also being carried out.

According to the final draft report of the feasibility study, the project will have 11 proposed lines with a total length of 258 kilometres (160 mi) at a cost of ৳871273 crore (US$71 billion). This budget will cover the construction of the total subway network, with each kilometer estimated to cost ৳3377 crore (US$280 million). The study underscores the significance of the public-private partnership (PPP) model for financing the construction of the subway.

During a meeting on 11 May 2022, chaired by Road Transport and Bridges Minister Obaidul Quader, the decision to establish a separate company for operating the subway was not approved. Instead, relevant authorities were instructed to proceed cautiously with this initiative. The executive director of BBA noted that construction will commence upon the government's final decision regarding the project.

== Phases ==
The consultancy firm conducting the feasibility study recommends completing the project in three phases. The total network consisting of 11 routes encompassing 85 underground stations is expected to be completed by mid-2050.

=== Phase one ===
The first phase consisting of four routes totaling 105 kilometres (65 mi), is estimated to be completed by 2030, with an estimated construction cost of ৳350066 crore (US$29 billion). The following routes will be implemented in this phase: Gabtoli to Mastul (Route B), Tongi to Jhilmil (Route O), Keraniganj to Kanchpur (Route S) and Narayanganj to Uttara Sector-13 (Route T).

=== Phase two ===
In the second phase of the project, an additional four routes are proposed to be completed by the year 2040. These routes are identified as D, G, J, and P.

=== Phase three ===
In the third phase of the project, three more subways are anticipated to be completed by mid-2050. These routes are designated as U, V, and W.

== Criticisms ==
Several criticisms have been leveled at the subway project. These include concerns about the lack of coordination between agencies, with Bangladesh Bridge Authority bypassing the Dhaka Transport Coordination Authority, leading to potential inefficiencies in planning and execution. Questions were raised about the suitability of the subway due to monsoon flooding and the lack of urban planning. Additionally, there have been challenges related to the unavailability of funds, raising doubts about the project's financial viability. Critics also point out that the summary of the feasibility study report offers scant insight into the necessity and utility of the subway.

The project has also been criticized for ignoring the Revised Strategic Transport Plan (RSTP), raising questions about the allocation of resources and the possibility of potentially wasting public funds. The fact that another agency, the Dhaka Mass Transit Company Limited (DMTCL), is already implementing the RSTP for building five metro lines adds complexity to the situation and raises doubts about the need for redundancy in planning and implementation efforts.

== Routes ==
Route	Expected Completion	Route Alignment	Stations	Length (km)	Terminals		Interchange Stations
O	2030	Teghoria Bazar, Muslimnagar, Sadarghat, Gulistan, Kakrail, Moghbazar, Hatirjheel, BG Press, Mohakhali, Kakoli, Rajanigandha Market (Kachukhet), Bhashantek, Kalshi, Uttara Sector-17, North Baunia, Uttara Sector-14, Uttara Sector-10, Machimpur	27	28.96	Tongi	Jhilmil	
B	2030	Mirpur 11, Ceramic Road, Matikata, Jamuna Future Park, Bashundhara Residential Area, Mostul	15	19.1	Gabtoli	Mostul	
S	2030	Lalbagh, Naya Bazar, Sayedabad, Rayerbagh, Signboard, Chittagong Road	18	18.96	Keraniganj	Sonarpur	
T	2030	Ashulia Model Town East, Uttara Sector-13, Uttara North, Azampur Kacha Bazar, Shah Kabir Mazar Road, Noddapara (Dakkhinkhan), Bashundhara South, Sunvalley North, Aftabnagar East, Nandipara, Green Model Town, Rayerbagh, Fatullah	33	38.47	Uttara Sector-13	Narayanganj	
D	2040	Keraniganj, Hazaribagh, Science Lab, Shahbagh, Kakrail, Rajarbagh, Bashabo	14	15.68	Bhawal	East Nandipara	
G	2040	Sashanghat Road, Sadarghat, Lalbagh, Hazaribagh, Mohammadpur Areas	15	17.33	Bashundhara Riverview	Gabtoli	
J	2040	Mohammadpur, Collage gate, Bijoynagar, Mohakhali, Gulshan-1, Badda, Jalshiri Sector-4			Hazaribagh	Purbachal Sector 2	
P	2040	Sayedabad, Bashabo, Rampura, Police Plaza, Gulshan-1, Gulshan-2, Matikata Road, Airport		22.99	Sadarghat	Shah Kabir Mazar	
U	2050	Teghoria, Kazigaon, Narayaganj Bandar	8	13.83	Teghoria	Narayanganj Bandar	
V	2050	Tongi, Konabari	10	16.99	Tongi	Konabari	
W	2050	Gabtoli-Jahangirnagar University-Ambagan	8	15.52	Gabtoli	Ambagan	
Total			148	258			

== See also ==
- Dhaka Metro Rail
- List of megaprojects in Bangladesh
