= Padma Barrage =

- Location within Bangladesh
- Official name: Padma Barrage
- Country: Bangladesh
- Location: Satbaria, Pabna to Char Jhikri, Rajbari
- Coordinates: 23°47′47″N 89°35′4″E
- Purpose: I,N,P
- Status: Planned
- Construction began: July 2026
- Opening date: 2033
- Construction cost: Tk 50,443.64 crore
- Owner: Bangladesh Water Development Board
- Operator: Bangladesh Water Development Board

Dam and spillways
- Impounds: Padma River
- Length: 2,100 metres (6,900 ft)
- Spillways: 78

Reservoir
- Total capacity: 2,900 million cubic meters
- Surface area: 628 km^{2} (242 sq mi)

Power Station
- Installed capacity: 113MW

Padma Barrage is a proposed dam in Bangladesh, extending from Satbaria, Pabna District to Char Jhikri, Rajbari District . It will be built to store water for Bangladesh during the dry season, in response of diverting water from India's Farakka Barrage.

== History ==
India started building the Farakka Barrage in the 1960s and unilaterally commissioned the Farakka Barrage in 1975, which caused extensive damage to the downstream region of Bangladesh. And the environment of the Sundarbans began to deteriorate. And there was a massive increase in salinity in the southwestern region of the country. In view of which, the then Pakistani government started examining the feasibility of building the dam. The feasibility was examined three more times until 2000 after Bangladesh's independence. When the Ganga Water Sharing Agreement was signed in 1996, the progress of the project was halted. The agreement was valid from 1996 to 2026. And since the fair share of water was not understood even during the agreement, the interim government of Bangladesh took the initiative to implement the project again in January 2026. Initially, the project was divided into two parts. The first part of which will include the construction of a 2.1-kilometer-long dam, river control and channel restoration of the Madhumati River and Hisna-Mathabhanga River, hydroelectric projects and irrigation for agricultural purposes in the Khulna, Jashore, Kushtia and Faridpur regions of the southwestern region. And will work for the environmental restoration of the Sundarbans. The first part is scheduled to be completed in 2031. The work on the second part is planned to start in 2028 and be completed by 2034. In this part, the remaining river basins in the southern region will be dredged and fully restored. And projects related to irrigation for agricultural lands in the Rajshahi and Pabna regions of the northern region have been taken up.

== First phase approval by ECNEC (May 2026) ==
On 13 May 2026, Bangladesh's ECNEC approved the first phase of the Padma Barrage project at a cost of Tk 34,497.25 crore (approx US$280 million). Water Resources Minister Shahiduddin Chowdhury Anee said the barrage aims to "negate the negative impact" of India's Farakka Barrage and is a matter of Bangladesh's own national interest requiring no discussion with India. The project, fully financed by Bangladesh and targeted for completion by 2033, will cover 19 districts across the Rajshahi, Dhaka and Barishal divisions.

== Water conservation and use ==
Once operational, the dam will store 2,900 million cubic meters of water during the dry season, which will generate 113 megawatts of electricity, and will release 570 cubic meters of water into the rivers of the southwestern region during the dry season, thereby maintaining the normal flow of the river and contributing to the reduction of salinity in the southwestern region.
