= Karnaphuli Tunnel =

First underwater road-tunnel of South Asia in Chittagong, Bangladesh

Coordinates: 22.2304°N 91.8044°E

- Location of the tunnel in Patenga To Anwara Upazila, Chattogram Division

Overview
- Location: Chittagong, Bangladesh
- Status: Operational
- Waterway: Karnaphuli River
- Route: 2
- Start: South Patenga
- End: Anwara Upazila

Operation
- Opened: 28 October 2023; 2 years ago
- Owner: Government of Bangladesh
- Traffic: 17,000 per day
- Toll: ৳200-৳1,000

Technical
- Design engineer: Chinese
- Length: 3.32 km (2.06 mi)
- No. of lanes: 4
- Operating speed: Maximum 80 km/h
- Width: 10.8 m (35 ft)
- Depth below water: 18 to 31 m
- Grade: A1

The Karnaphuli Tunnel (Bengali: কর্ণফুলী টানেল) is an underwater expressway tunnel in the port city of Chittagong, Bangladesh under the Karnaphuli River. The length of the entire route is 9.39 kilometres (5.83 mi), with the tunnel making up 3.32 kilometres (2.06 mi) of the length. The tunnel diameter is 10.80 metres (35.4 ft). It is expected, over 17,000 vehicles will be able to use this tunnel daily. The cost of the project is estimated at US$1.1B, of which around half is financed by the Exim Bank of China. The Karnaphuli Tunnel is the first underwater road tunnel in South Asia. It is expected to improve the Dhaka–Chittagong–Cox's Bazar highway network. A Chinese company, China Communications Construction Company, was selected to construct it. The tunnel segments were produced in Zhenjiang, China.

== History ==
On 14 October 2016, the Bangladesh Prime Minister and Chinese President Xi Jinping laid the foundation stone of the project. Prime Minister Sheikh Hasina and Chinese Communist Party general secretary Xi Jinping inaugurated the construction site of the tunnel on 14 October 2017. Hasina officially inaugurated the construction of the tunnel and inaugurated the tunnel boring phase on 24 February 2019. On 28 October 2023, Sheikh Hasina inaugurated the tunnel as Bangabandhu Sheikh Mujibur Rahman Tunnel and was made available for traffic from 6 am the next day.

It was renamed to Karnaphuli Tunnel on 26 February 2025 by the Interim government of Bangladesh.

== Financing ==
The construction of the tunnel cost ৳10374 crore (equivalent to ৳110 billion or US$930 million in 2024). In October 2016, during the visit of Chinese President Xi Jinping to Dhaka, the loan agreement for the construction of the Karnaphuli Tunnel was signed. According to the agreement, Exim Bank of China provided ৳5913 crore (US$480 million) as a 20-year loan at 2 percent interest rate. The rest of the funding was provided by the Bangladesh government.

According to the Karnaphuli Tunnel Authority, in the first year since its inauguration, the daily expenditure is four times more than the income. The tunnel authorities are facing financial losses, mainly due to the lack of expected traffic. According to the Bangladesh Bridge Authority, till 20 October 2024, an average of 3,910 vehicles used the tunnel daily, from which the average daily income was Tk 10 lakh 37 thousand, against the daily operating cost of Tk 37 lakh 47 thousand. As there is not enough income from the tunnel, these expenses are being paid from the state treasury.

== Technologies ==
Karnaphuli Tunnel has more than 100 cameras for security, capable of discerning license plate numbers.

== See also ==
- Dhaka-Chittagong Highway
- Chittagong port
- List of megaprojects in Bangladesh
- Sheikh Mujibur Rahman, namesake of the tunnel
- Belt and Road Initiative
