= Bangladesh Bridge Authority =

Government agency in Bangladesh

- বাংলাদেশ সেতু কর্তৃপক্ষ
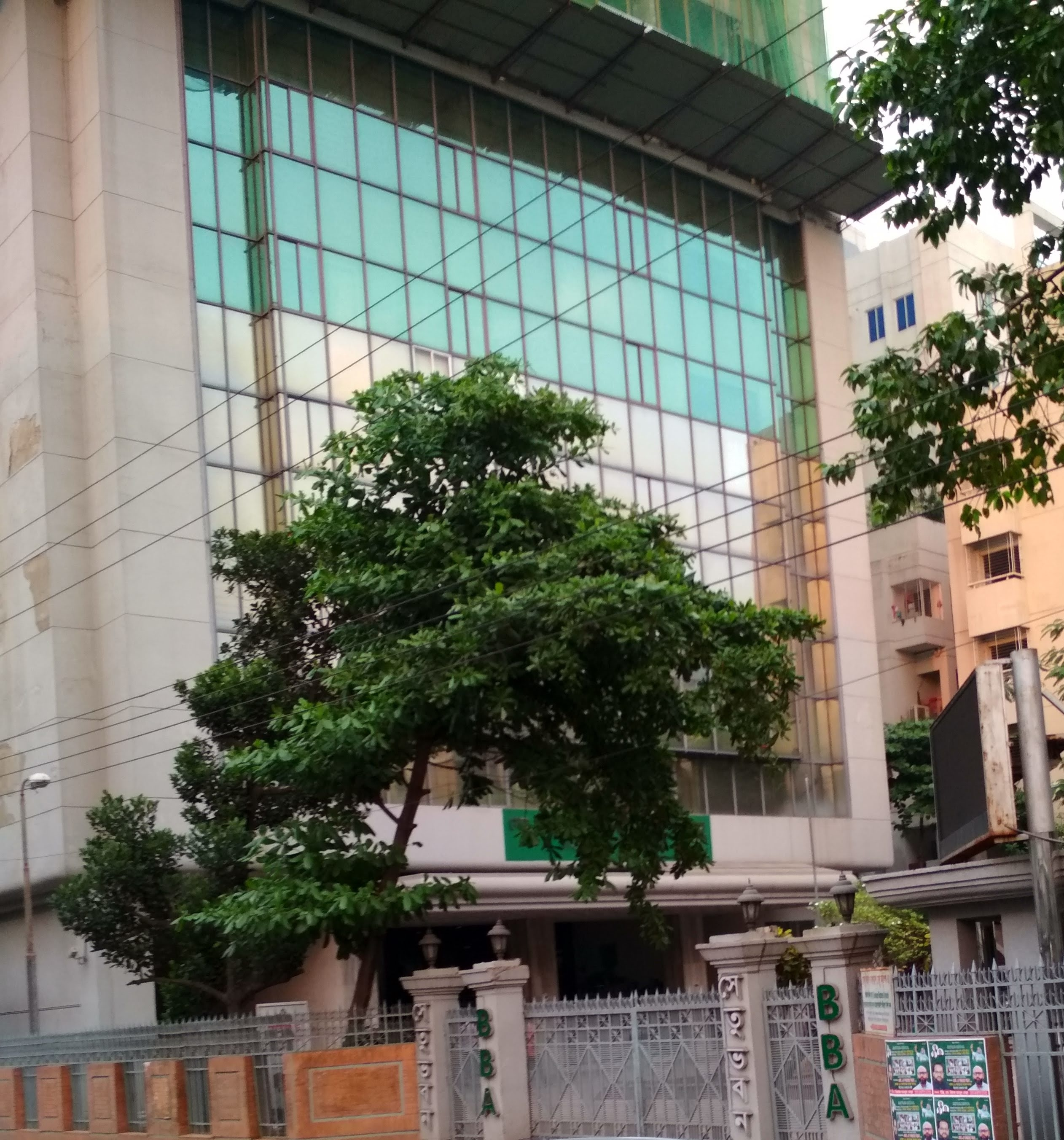
- Headquarter of Bangladesh Bridge Authority

Agency overview
- Formed: 1985; 41 years ago
- Jurisdiction: Bangladesh
- Headquarters: Setu Bhaban, Dhaka, Bangladesh
- Annual budget: Allocated by Government
- Agency executive: Rashidul Hasan, Executive Director
- Parent agency: Ministry of Road Transport and Bridges
- Website: www.bba.gov.bd

The Bangladesh Bridge Authority (BBA) is a statutory government body responsible for the construction and maintenance of bridges, tunnels, flyovers (elevated roads), overpasses, causeways, and subways in Bangladesh. It is headquartered in the capital Dhaka. The authority operates under the purview of the Bridges Division within the Ministry of Road Transport and Bridges.

== Background ==
In 1985, the Jamuna Multipurpose Bridge Authority was established by a presidential ordinance to construct the Jamuna Multipurpose Bridge. On 19 December 2007, the organization underwent a name change and became known as the Bangladesh Bridge Authority. According to the Bangladesh Bridge Authority Act of 2016, the authority is tasked with the implementation and maintenance of various infrastructure projects, including bridges spanning 1,500 meters or more, toll roads, flyovers, expressways, tunnels, causeways, ring roads, and other similar structures.

The agency is responsible for the implementation of the Padma Bridge, the longest in the country. In the mid-2010s, it was involved in the Padma Bridge Corruption Scandal. However, the charges were later dismissed by both the Canadian court and Bangladesh Anti-Corruption Commission.

== Ongoing projects ==
- Padma Multipurpose Bridge Project
- Support to Dhaka Elevated Expressway project
- Dhaka Elevated Expressway Project
- Construction of Multi Lane Road Tunnel under the River Karnaphuli
- Greater Dhaka Sustainable Urban Transport Project (BRT, Gazipur-Airport)
- Dhaka-Ashulia Elevated Expressway Project
- Feasibility Study Project for Subway Construction in Dhaka City
- Sajek Road Link Project- II Upgradation of Alenga-Hatikamrul-Rangpur Highway to Four Lanes (Bangladesh Bridge Authority Part -34 Kilometers)
- Dhaka Subway
- Master Plan and Feasibility Study Project for 6 Bridges
- Patuakhali-Amtali-Barguna-Kakichira road (R-880) Bridge Construction on Pigeon River
- Construction of Bridge on Bakerganj-Baupal Upazila Road (Z8806 & 8044) Factory River
- Bachcharanpur road (R-203) Bridge Construction on the Meghna River
- Construction of Bridge over Tetulia and Kalbadar River on Barisal-Bhola Road
- Patuakhali-Amtali-Barguna-Kakichira road (R-880) Bridge on the Bishkhali River
