= Shaheed Wasim Akram Flyover =

Second Elevated Expressway in Bangladesh

Shaheed Wasim Akram Flyover Chittagong Elevated Expressway
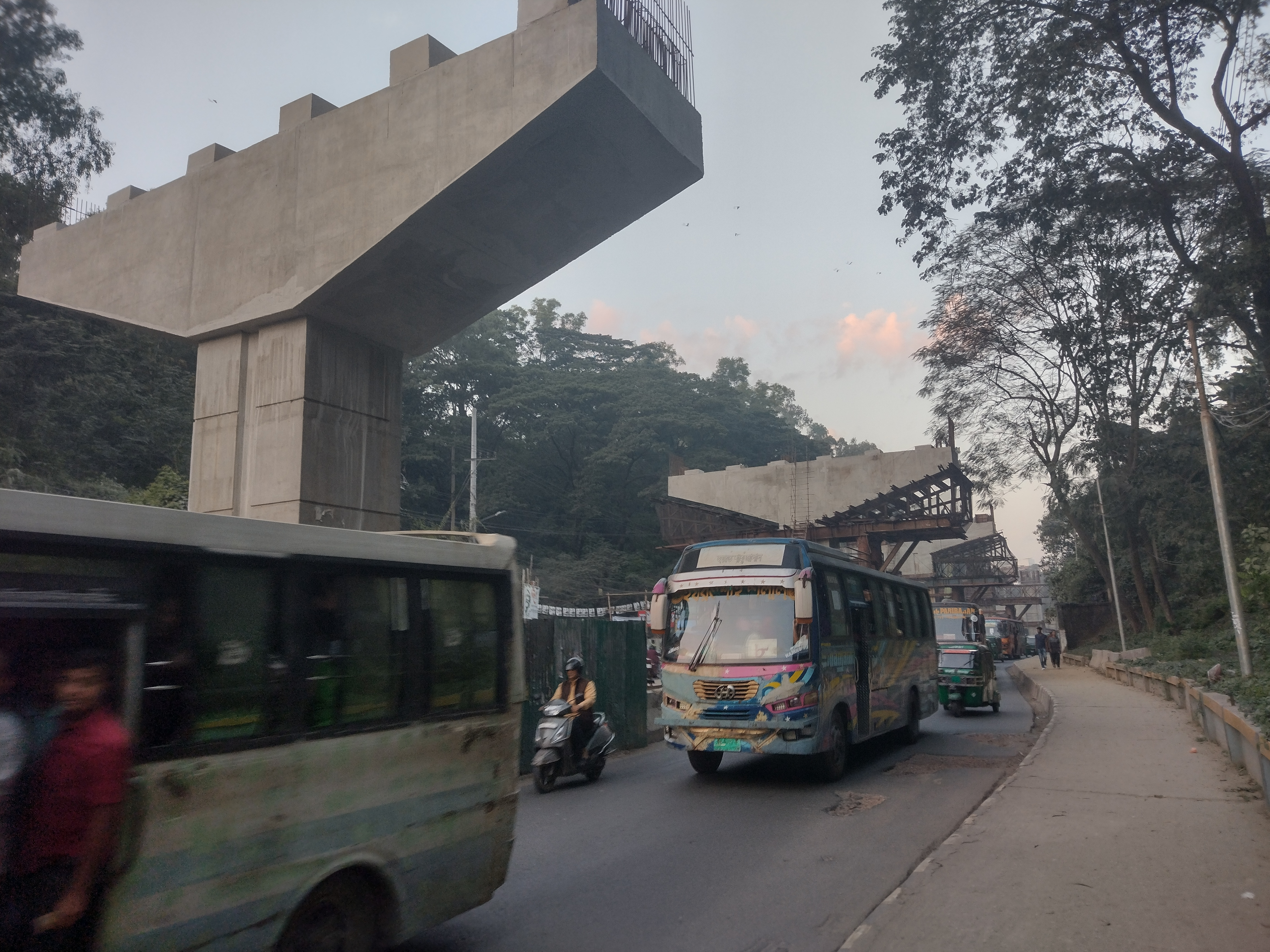
- Underconstruction Elevated Expressway near Tiger Pass, Chattogram, in December 2023

Route information
- Length: 16 km (9.9 mi)
- Status: Completed

Location
- Country: Bangladesh

Highway system
- Roads in Bangladesh

Shaheed Wasim Akram Flyover (Bengali: শহীদ ওয়াসিম আকরাম উড়ালসড়ক), or commonly known as Chittagong Elevated Expressway (Bengali: চট্টগ্রাম এলিভেটেড এক্সপ্রেসওয়ে), is Bangladesh's second elevated expressway project, which connects the Shah Amanat International Airport with Lalkhan Bazaar. Its total length is 16 km (9.9 mi)(28.5 km with the connecting ramps). It was opened for a trial run in August 2024. Since January 2025, Chittagong Development Authority (CDA) started collecting the toll.

== Contracts for the expressway ==
The Max-Ranken Joint Venture has entered contract with Chittagong Development Authority for building the Chittagong Elevated Expressway.

== Name ==
The expressway was initially named after former Chittagong Mayor A. B. M. Mohiuddin Chowdhury. In January 2025, the name was changed to "Shaheed Wasim Akram Flyover" after Wasim Akram, a student killed in the 2024 July massacre in Chattogram.

== See also ==
- List of megaprojects in Bangladesh
- List of roads in Bangladesh
- Dhaka Elevated Expressway
