= Bangladesh Delta Plan =

The Bangladesh Delta Plan 2100 is a comprehensive development plan formulated by the Government of Bangladesh in 2018 focusing on economic growth, environmental conservation, and enhanced climate resilience.

== See also ==
- Climate change in Bangladesh
