= Dhaka–Chittagong high-speed railway =

First Bangladeshi high speed Railway

Overview
- Owner: (undeclared)
- Line number: 1

Service
- Operator(s): (undeclared)

Technical
- Line length: 227.3 km (141.2 mi)
- Number of tracks: 2
- Track gauge: 1,435 mm (4 ft 8 1/2 in) standard gauge
- Electrification: 25 kV AC, 50 Hz, overhead catenary
- Operating speed: 300 km/h (190 mph)

The Dhaka–Chittagong high-speed railway was a proposed high-speed rail line connecting Dhaka, the capital and largest city, with the southeast harbour city of Chittagong. The project was estimated to cost ৳96,752 crore (US$11.4 billion). The project was shelved cancelled in 2021 for economic reasons.

The travel time between Dhaka and Chittagong would be 73 minutes for trains stopping at intermediate stations, and 55 minutes for nonstop trains. The ticket cost for one-way journey will be ৳2,000 without any discount or concession, more than three times higher than a conventional seat on current inter-city trains.

== History ==
On May 31, 2018, Bangladesh Railway signed an agreement with the China Railway Design Corporation and Mazumder Enterprise. This contract is designed to verify the design and feasibility of proposed high-speed train lines. According to this agreement, feasibility and design work will be completed in December 2019 at a cost of Tk102.10 crore. The government of Bangladesh is bearing this cost.

It is expected to reduce travel time to between 55 and 73 minutes between Dhaka and Chittagong while current inter-city trains has to spend around six hours of travel time are needed to cover the distance by the current 321 km (199 mi) metre-gauge railways. The new route will be 227.3 km (141.2 mi), making the route 90 kilometres (55 mi) shorter. (Note: Dhaka–Chittagong high-speed railway route on OSM) 464.2 hectares (4.642 km^{2}) of land will be needed to be acquired by Bangladesh Railway to implement the project.

Chinese companies and the World Bank have shown interest in providing funding for the project through public–private partnership and build-own-operate models.

The project was cancelled in 2021 for economic reasons.

== See also ==
- List of megaprojects in Bangladesh
