= Dhaka Elevated Expressway =

Toll road in Bangladesh

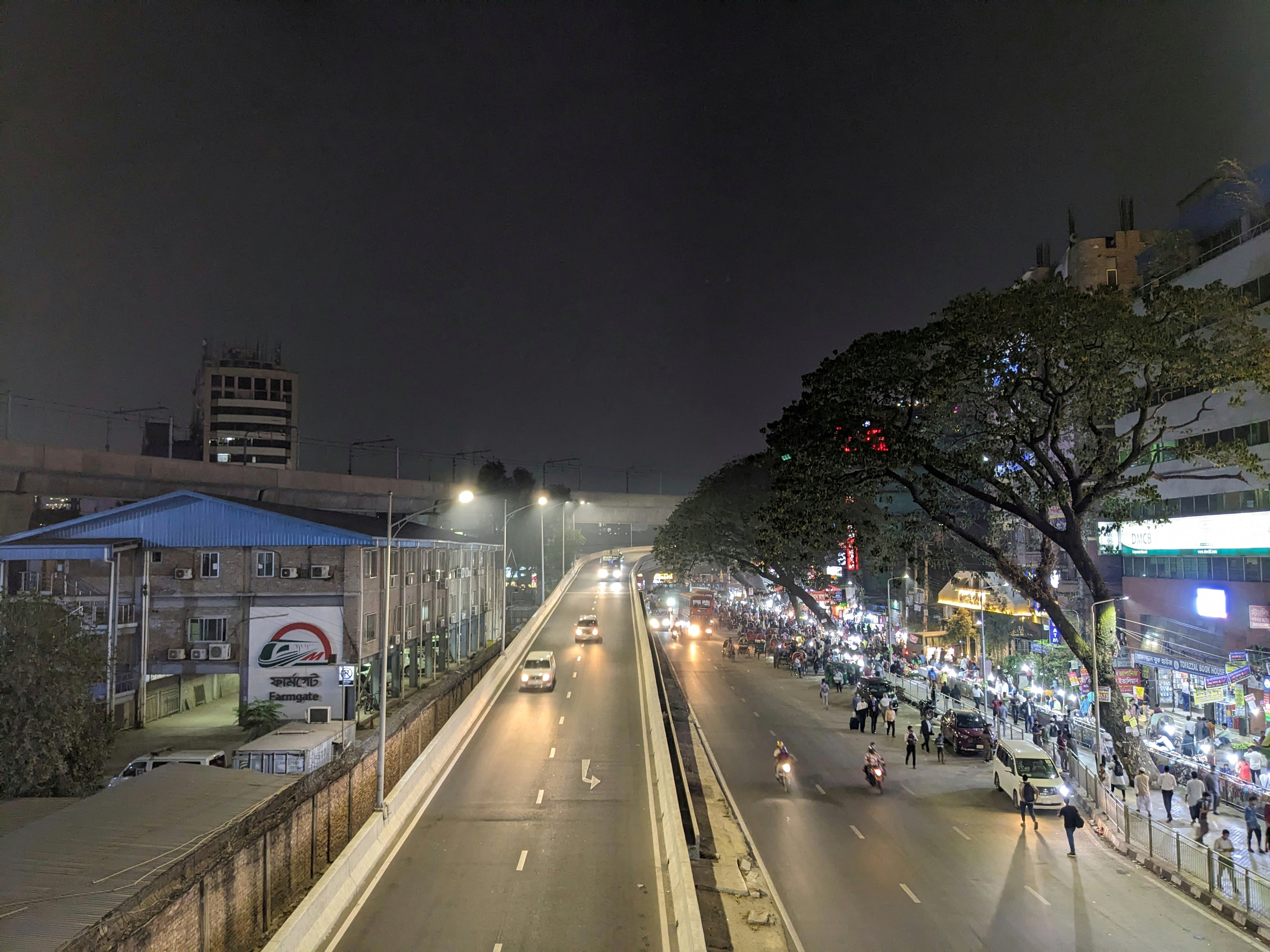
- Dhaka Elevated Expressway exit ramp near Farmgate metro station

Route information
- Length: 19.73 km (12.26 mi) 46.73 km (29.04 mi) including ramps 11.5 km (7.1 mi) in operation
- Status: Partially operational (78% Completed)
- Existed: 2023; 3 years ago–present
- Restrictions: Three-wheelers and motorcycles not permitted to use the roadway

Location
- Country: Bangladesh

Highway system
- Roads in Bangladesh

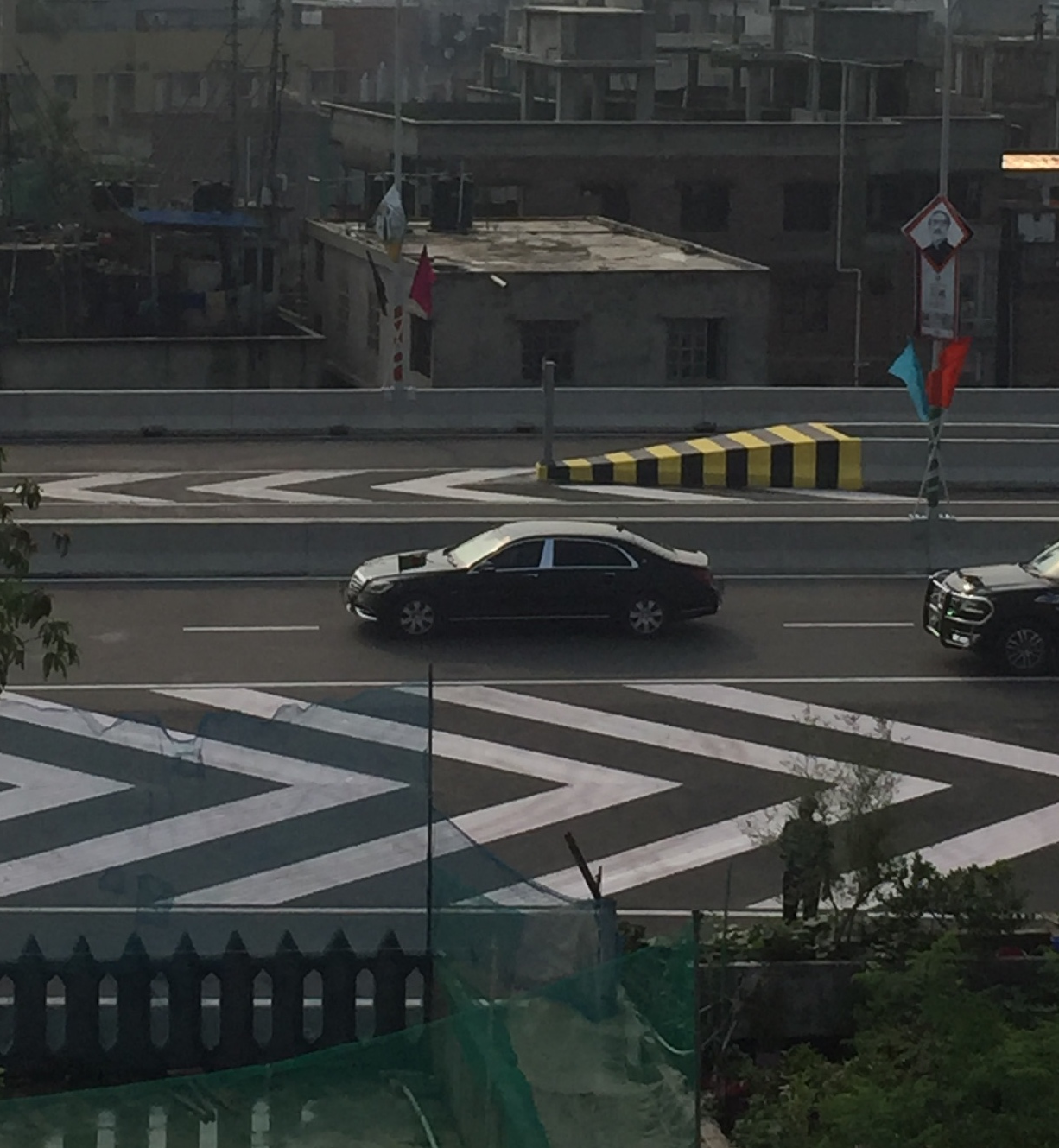
Prime minister's car passing Dhaka Elevated Expressway

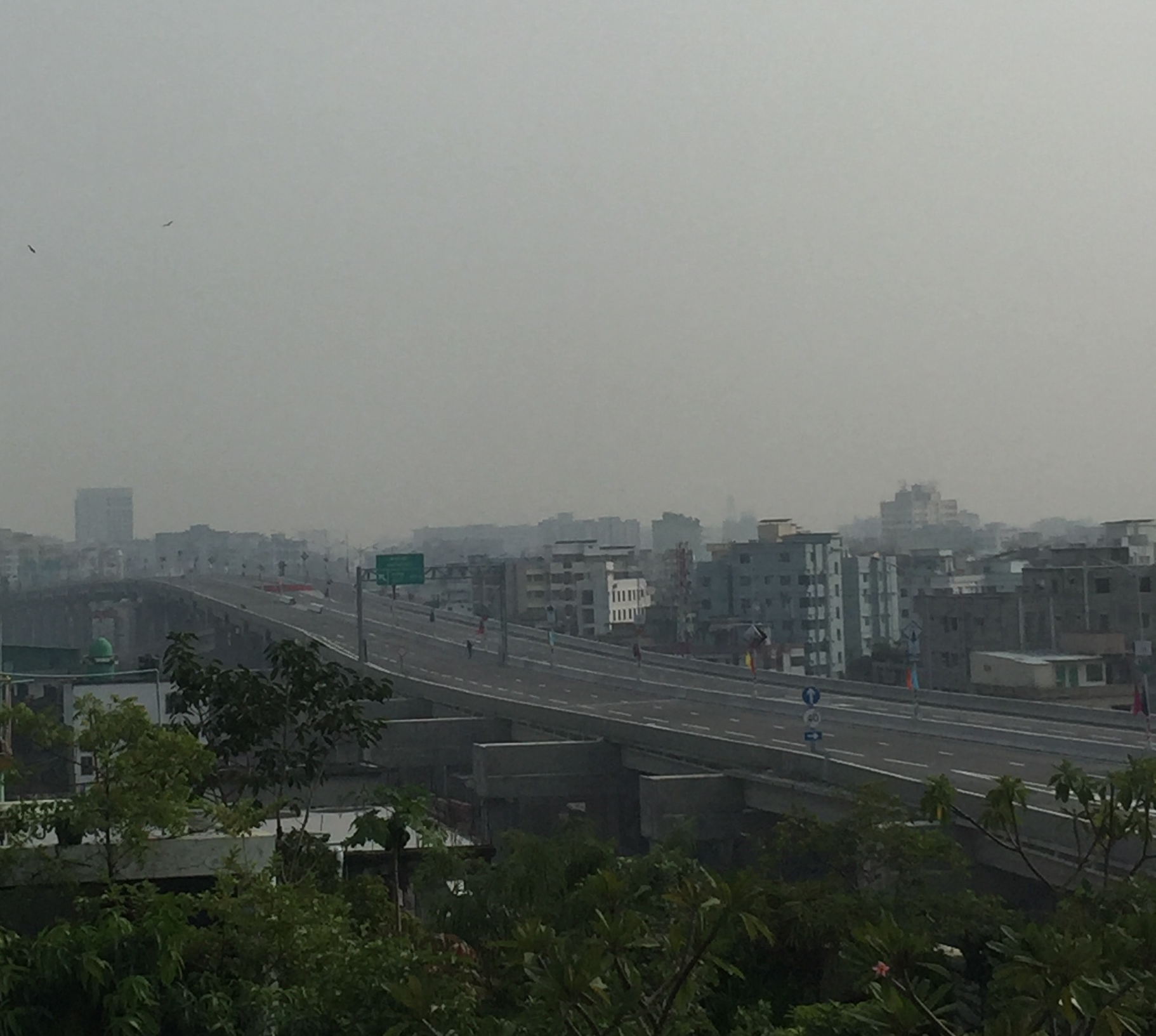
Elevated Expressway side view

The Dhaka Elevated Expressway (Bengali: ঢাকা উড়াল মহাসড়ক) is an all-elevated toll road in the Bangladeshi capital Dhaka. The 19.73-kilometre (12.26 mi) road, regarded as the country's first elevated expressway, partially opened in 2023. It connects Hazrat Shahjalal International Airport with Farmgate area in Tejgaon, with construction ongoing to connect it with the Dhaka–Chittagong Highway. Its construction aims to enhance traffic capacity within and around Dhaka city by improving connectivity between the northern part of the city and the central, southern, and south-eastern parts.

== Route description ==
The four-lane Dhaka Elevated Expressway route begins near Hazrat Shahjalal International Airport at Kawla and runs parallel to the railway line through Tejgaon, Maghbazar, Kamalapur, and ends at Kutubkhali near Jatrabari along the Dhaka–Chittagong Highway.

Once completed, the 19.73-kilometre (12.26 mi) expressway will feature ramps at 31 points, making its total length, including these ramps, 46.73 kilometres (29.04 mi). Additionally, there will be 11 toll plazas along the route.

As per the design specifications, the speed limit on the expressway is set at 80 kilometres per hour (50 mph). The expressway is toll-operated and accessible to eight types of vehicles, including buses, minibuses, sedans, SUVs, specific trucks, and pickups. Two- and three-wheel vehicles, including motorcycles, CNG-run auto-rickshaws, bicycles, and pedestrians are not permitted on the expressway.

== History ==
=== Background ===
In 2005, the government approved a 20-year Strategic Transport Plan (STP) for Dhaka, which included proposals for projects like the metrorail, elevated expressway, and ring road. This plan was revised in 2015 and the Dhaka Elevated Expressway was included as part of this plan.

The Dhaka Elevated Expressway project commenced in 2011. On 15 December 2013, the Bangladesh Bridge Authority signed a revised agreement with the First Dhaka Elevated Expressway Company Limited, the investment company of the project.

The project is being implemented under the public–private partnership model, involving the China-based China Shandong International Economic & Technical Cooperation Group and Sinohydro Corporation Limited. While Thailand-based Italian-Thai Development was originally a major stakeholder in the project, it is no longer involved following a legal dispute in late 2024.

The project is being executed in three phases. Phase one spans from Kawla near Hazrat Shahjalal International Airport to Banani Railway Station, phase two stretches from Banani Railway Station to Moghbazar railway crossing, and phase three extends from Moghbazar rail crossing to Kutubkhali on the Dhaka–Chittagong highway. The total cost of the project, including main construction cost of the expressway, land acquisition, resettlement of the displaced, relocation of utility service lines, and consultation, amounts to ৳138.57 billion (US$1.1 billion).

==== Controversy ====
Construction of the expressway was temporarily halted for ten months starting in February 2024 due to financial challenges and legal disagreements among the project's stakeholders. The pause was extended by a court-issued stay order concerning the transfer of shares among the contractor companies, which was lifted by the Supreme Court's Appellate Division on 1 September 2024. By November, construction had resumed following a decision by the Singapore International Arbitration Centre (SIAC), which directed Italian-Thai Development to transfer its stake in the project to its Chinese partners, marking the end of its involvement in the project.

Construction of the expressway was halted again in 2025 following protests by environmental groups, who raised concerns about tree removal in Panthakunja Park and potential damage to the water bodies in Hatirjheel. The project coordinator rejected these claims and stated that the project's completion deadline would be extended to December 2026.

=== Operation ===
On 2 September 2023, the 11.5-kilometre (7.1 mi) Airport–Farmgate segment was inaugurated by the former Prime Minister Sheikh Hasina and opened to traffic on 3 September.

On 18 September 2023, the Bangladesh Road Transport Corporation inaugurated a bus service on the Airport–Farmgate route via the expressway.

On 20 March 2024, the Karwan Bazar ramp of the expressway in front of the Bangladesh Film Development Corporation (BFDC) has been opened for transport movement.

== Entry and exit list ==
As of March 2024, the expressway has a total of 16 entry and exit ramps. Upon full completion, it will feature 15 entry and 16 exit ramps.

=== Entry ramps ===
==== Southbound ====
Entry ramps for southbound vehicles are situated at Kawla near Hazrat Shahjalal International Airport, in front of the Army Golf Club on Airport Road, and at Kuril along Pragati Avenue, and at Banani Chairmanbari near Setu Bhaban, and at Mohakhali near Mohakhali Bus Terminal, and at Bijoy Sarani overpass

==== Northbound ====
To get on the expressway from the south, the entrances to the expressway are the north and south lanes of Bijoy Sarani overpass and Banani railway station on Kemal Ataturk Avenue in Banani.

=== Exit ramps ===
==== Southbound ====
When heading south, exit ramps are situated at Kemal Ataturk Avenue in Banani, Mohakhali Bus Terminal, Indira Road in Farmgate, and Karwan Bazar in front of Bangladesh Film Development Corporation.

==== Northbound ====
When travelling north from the south, the four exit ramps are located at the Mohakhali Bus Terminal, the Airport Road opposite Kemal Ataturk Avenue, Kuril Bishwa Road, and the third terminal of Hazrat Shahjalal International Airport.

== Tolls ==
The expressway will have 11 toll plazas when fully completed. Tolls for entering the expressway are collected in four categories.

Vehicle types	Toll rate
Private cars, microbuses (16 seats) and light trucks (below three tonnes)	৳80
Buses and mini-buses (16 seats and above)	৳160
Medium-sized trucks (up to six wheels)	৳320
Large trucks (more than six wheels)	৳400

== See also ==
- Dhaka–Ashulia Elevated Expressway, another elevated expressway under construction in Dhaka.
- List of roads in Bangladesh
- List of megaprojects in Bangladesh
