= DGDP =

DGDP may refer to:

- Deoxyguanosine diphosphate (dGDP)
- Directorate General of Defence Purchase (Bangladesh)
- Directorate General Defence Purchase (Pakistan)
