= Bir Uttam Ziaur Rahman Road =

Road in Dhaka, Bangladesh

- Bir Uttom Ziaur Rahman Road
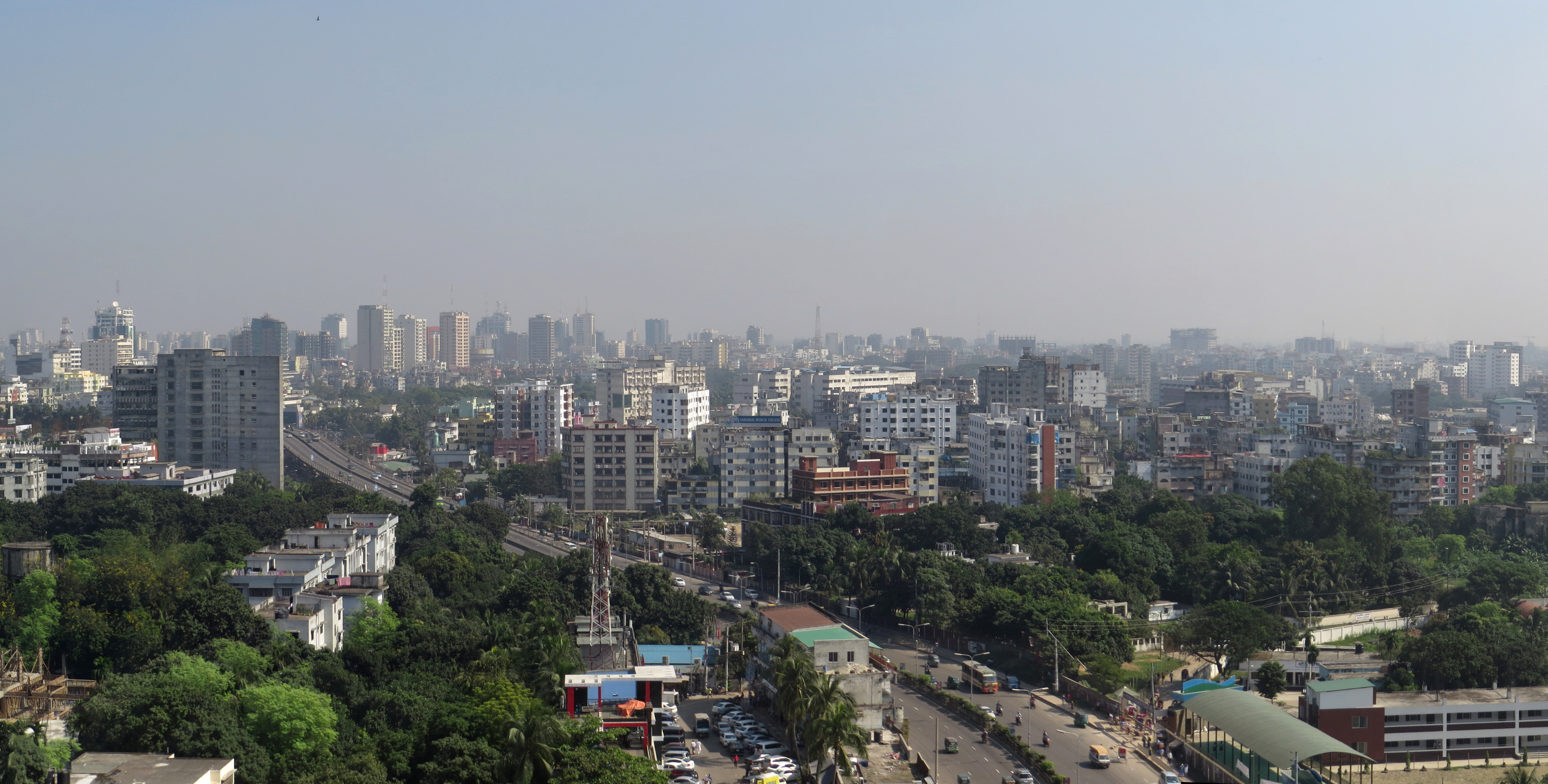
- Interactive map of Bir Uttam Ziaur Rahman Road
- Native name: Bengali: বীর উত্তম জিয়াউর রহমান সড়ক
- Namesake: Ziaur Rahman
- Type: Road
- Maintained by: Dhaka North City Corporation
- Location: Dhaka, Bangladesh
- Coordinates: 23.776155°N 90.393639°E

Bir Uttam Ziaur Rahman Road is a major commercial road located in the Tejgaon, Dhaka Cantonment, Mohakhali and Banani area of Dhaka city, Bangladesh. It is currently under the jurisdiction of Dhaka North City Corporation. The some offices of government and private business organizations and banks in Dhaka city are located here. This road is named after Ziaur Rahman, one of the political leaders of Bangladesh and the late President of Bangladesh.

== Description ==
The road extends from Bijoy Sarani Intersection to Mohakhali Flyover and some areas of Banani. There are various shops including commercial establishments on both sides of the road.

== Notable places ==
- BAF Base Bashar
- Birsrestho Shaheed Jahangir Gate
- Soinik Club
- Sena Kalyan Sangstha
- Banani DOHS
- Maasranga Television
- BAF Shaheen College Dhaka
- Mohakhali Flyover
- BAF Shaheen English Medium College
- Civil Aviation School And College, Tejgaon
- Directorate General of Defence Purchase
- Mohakhali DOHS
