= Directorate General of Defence Purchase =

Directorate General of Defence Purchase refers to:

- Directorate General of Defence Purchase (Bangladesh)
- Directorate General Defence Purchase (Pakistan)
