= KRISS Vector =

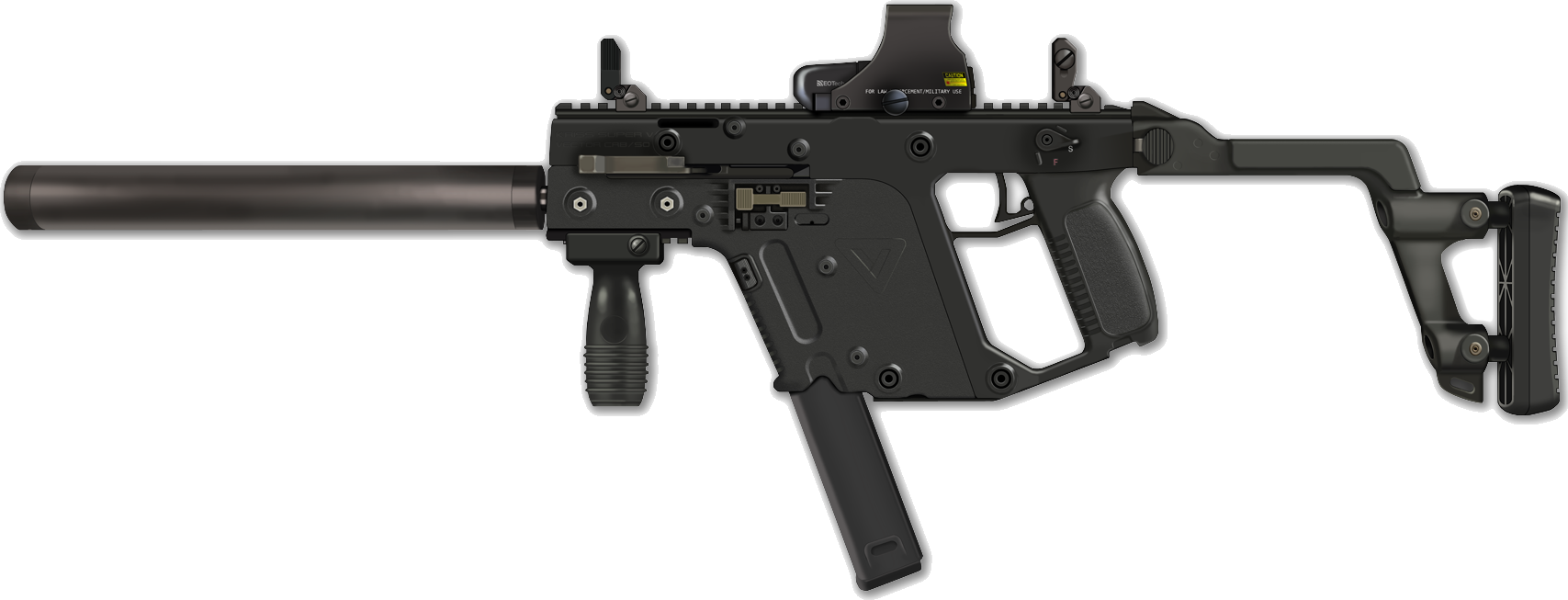
- KRISS Vector Gen I with an EOTech sight, suppressor and aftermarket foregrip
- Type: Submachine gun Pistol caliber carbine
- Place of origin: United States

Service history
- In service: 2010–present

Production history
- Designed: 2006
- Manufacturer: Kriss USA, Inc.
- Produced: 2009–present
- Variants: See Variants

Specifications
- Mass: 6 lb (2.7 kg) (SMG, SBR); 7 lb (3.2 kg) (CRB)
- Length: 24.3 in (620 mm) (SMG, SBR); 16 in (410 mm) w/ stock folded 34.8 in (880 mm) (CRB); 26.5 in (670 mm) w/ stock folded
- Barrel length: 5.5 in (140 mm) (SMG, SBR, SDP); 6.5 in (170 mm) (Optional for SMG, SBR, SDP Gen II); 16 in (410 mm) (CRB); 18.6 in (470 mm) (CRB, Canadian version)
- Cartridge: .22 LR.357 SIG.40 S&W.45 ACP; 9×19mm Parabellum; 9×21mm 10mm Auto
- Action: Off-axis bolt travel blowback, closed bolt
- Rate of fire: 1,200 rounds/min
- Effective firing range: 55 yards (50 meters); 70 yards (64 meters) with 16-inch barrel
- Feed system: Detachable box magazine, capacities; 9×19mm Parabellum: 10-, 17-, 19-, 33-round detachable Glock magazine or 40-round "MagEx2" extension; .45 ACP/10mm Auto: 10-, 13-round detachable Glock magazine or ~25-round "MagEx 25+" extension, 30-round "MagEx2" extension
- Sights: Flip-up iron sights and MIL-STD-1913 rail provided for optics

The KRISS Vector is a submachine gun developed by the American company KRISS USA, formerly Transformational Defense Industries (TDI). Civilian variants in semi-automatic only configuration are also available.

Designed in 2006 and seeing limited production since 2009, the KRISS Vector uses an unconventional delayed blowback system combined with in-line design to reduce perceived recoil and muzzle climb, invented by French engineer Renaud Kerbrat. The KRISS Vector is designed to accept extended Glock magazines and fires a variety of pistol cartridges.

== History ==
In the spring of 2007, TDI announced their development of a new submachine gun. It was an experimental weapon under advanced stages of development at that time.

The name Kriss comes from a Southeast Asian dagger with a flame-shaped blade.

The second generation prototype of the Vector, called the K10, was announced at 2011 SHOT Show. It is a slightly more compact version of the Vector that is based on the same Super V system. The main difference is a redesign of the lower receiver intended for easy caliber interchangeability; utilizing just a single takedown pin, users can change between 9×19mm, .40 S&W and .45 ACP by mounting different lower receivers. This also brought a redesign of the charging handle, which now travels diagonally, almost vertically, and can be mounted on either side of the K10.

Other notable differences were a new telescoping stock instead of a folding one, and a four-sided accessory rail tube around the barrel. The K10 was not displayed after SHOT Show 2013 and its status is unknown and likely has been canceled.

Kriss announced "Gen II" versions of the original Vector models in 2015. These feature a redesigned pistol grip, trigger, safety selector, and compatibility with a new 9×19mm lower. These appear to have replaced the K10 prototypes, though no features from the K10 were carried over.

At the 2024 SHOT Show, Kriss unveiled the "Gen III" vector. This new generation has a redesigned upper housing that has a slimmer profile and is also lighter compared to the "Gen II". Further updates include an ambidextrous magazine release, the replacement of the handguard's Picatinny rail with an M-LOK mounting system and improved trigger handling.

== Design ==
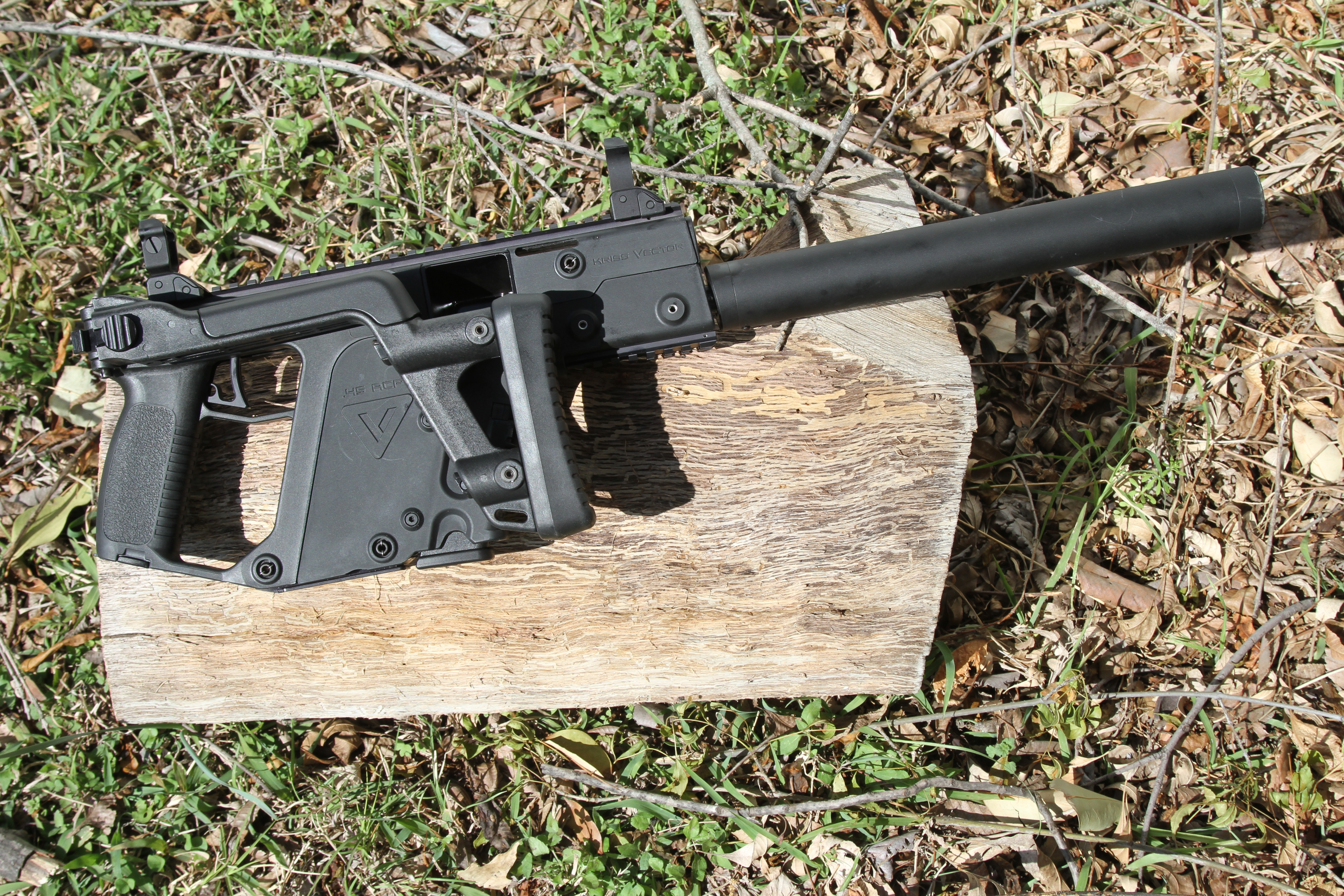
KRISS Vector CRB Generation 1 with the stock folded, and standard barrel shroud (not a functioning suppressor)

The Vector uses an articulated mechanism referred to as the "Kriss Super V", which allows the bolt and an inertia block to move downward into a recess behind the magazine well.

The theory is that at the end of this travel, the energy is transmitted downward rather than rearward, thus reducing the felt recoil. When fired, the barrel axis is in line with the shoulder as in the M16 rifle, but also in line with the shooter's hand.

This is intended to reduce muzzle climb when combined with the off-axis bolt travel, though it also greatly raises the sight line in comparison to the bore axis. The initial prototype model by TDI achieved a rate of fire of 1,500 rounds per minute, though this was brought down to around 1,200 rounds per minute on the production models. Civilian models are limited to semi-automatic only.

The Vector is split into two major assemblies in a similar manner to the AR-15 rifle, secured together with four push pins. Due to the weapon's unusual layout, the lower contains the action, charging handle, magazine well and barrel, while the upper contains the ejection port, rail system, pistol grip and fire control components, as well as the stock for configurations that have one. This modular design allows for toolless caliber conversions by swapping out only the lower.

The Vector's safety is ambidextrous (as well as the fire mode selector on the auto trigger pack) while the ejection port, charging handle, bolt release catch and magazine release are not, and are only available in a right-handed configuration.

Calibers such as .22 LR, .40 S&W and 9×19mm Parabellum were mentioned when the gun was first released. The Generation II versions with multiple design changes including a new 9mm variant were confirmed at SHOT Show 2015, though the .22LR version had yet to materialize and was thought to have been canceled up until SHOT Show 2020, when they announced its release.

Vectors chambered in .45 ACP are designed to accept standard Glock 21 pistol magazines. A special "MagEx 30" kit was available to convert a factory 13-round .45 ACP Glock magazine to an extended high-capacity version, but was later marketed as a "25+" round kit.

Vectors chambered in 9×19mm Parabellum use standard Glock 17 magazines. In 2019, KRISS released the "MagEx2" which extends the capacity of a factory standard Glock Magazine. The MagEx 2 is available in 9mm for an overall capacity of 40 rounds, 33 rounds of 10mm and 30 rounds of .45 ACP.

== Variants ==
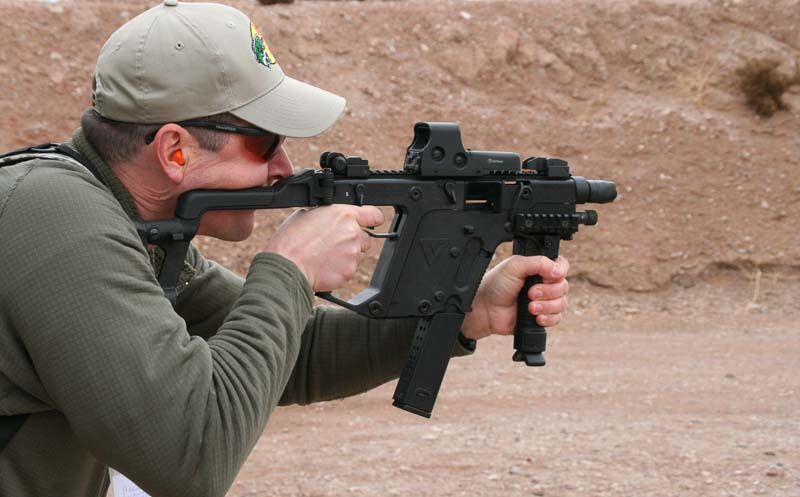
KRISS Vector SMG on a shooting range at the 2010 SHOT Show

The KRISS Vector has undergone two generations of modification. The Gen I version is the baseline model of the Vector family. It was later replaced by the improved Gen II version which features a redesigned pistol grip and trigger and has the swing angle of the safety lever reduced from 120 to 45 degrees.

The Gen II also eliminates the opening above the barrel for the original Vector's optional Surefire weapon light, since these are no longer manufactured. In addition to the original Flat Black finish, optional factory Cerakote coatings now come in Olive Drab (green), Flat Dark Earth (tan), Alpine (white), or Combat Gray.

The Vector SMG variant is only available for military and law enforcement use. It features a 5.5-inch barrel (with an option of a 6.5-inch barrel on the Gen II version), a folding stock, flip-up Midwest Industries back-up iron sights (BUIS) (KRISS Sights on Gen II weapons), a full-length Picatinny rail for mounting various optics/scopes, and either two mode fire selector (single and full-auto) or a three mode fire selector (single, two-round burst and full-auto). The Vector SMG is only available in .45 ACP and 9×19mm Parabellum; due to the nature of its design, the auto trigger pack is not compatible with any semi-automatic Vector lower. The 9mm model uses Glock 17-compatible magazines (typically the extended 33-rounder used by the Glock 18) and the .45-caliber model uses Glock 21 magazines.

Semi-automatic variants are produced and available for the US civilian market. There are three main configurations, the Vector CRB, Vector SBR and Vector SDP. In addition to 9×19mm Parabellum and .45 ACP, they can also be chambered in .40 S&W (using Glock 22 magazines), 10mm Auto (using Glock 20 magazines), or .357 SIG (using Glock 31 magazines).

A variant chambered for 9×21mm IMI that feeds from standard 9×19mm Glock 17 magazines is available for the Italian civilian market. The .22 LR variant feeds from a proprietary 10-round magazine, and functions using a traditional straight blowback operating system rather than the Super V delayed system.

The Canadian civil market versions only came with the blocked to 10-round magazines (until the rifle was banned by Order in Council on December 5th, 2024). Some American civil market versions only come with 10-round magazines rather than the full capacity magazines. Like the Law Enforcement / Military SMG models, the civilian model Vectors can be converted to chamber and fire other calibers if the lower receiver groups are changed.

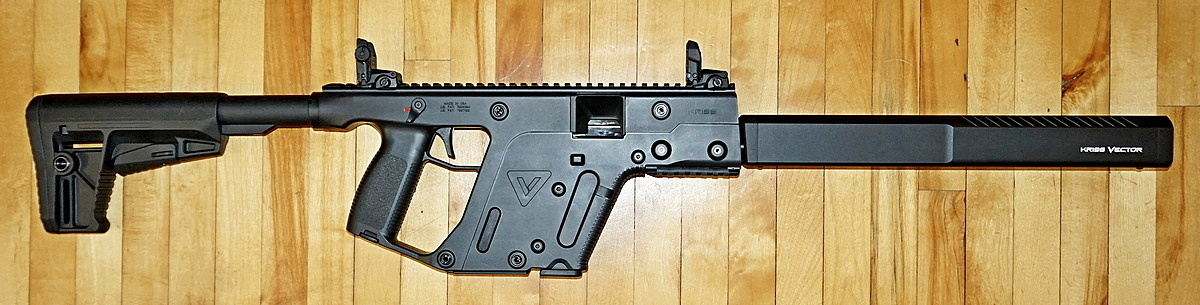
KRISS Vector CRB 18.6 inch barrel (Canadian version)

- The Vector CRB (carbine) is a semi-automatic carbine with a permanently affixed barrel shroud to the standard 5.5-inch barrel, extending it to 16-inch (410 mm), intended for states with short-barrel rifle bans, with an 18.6-inch (470 mm) version produced for the Canadian market before it was banned on Dec 5th, 2024. The standard model has a folding stock (fixed in states where state law prohibits). Variants exist for compliance with various state gun laws, including a California-legal "featureless" variant with a Kydex grip-wrap barrier (prohibits gripping the back of the pistol grip), a hand stop replacing the usual vertical foregrip, and a permanently affixed Defiance DS150 stock to give an overall length of 36.5-inch (930 mm).
- The Vector SBR (Short Barrel Rifle) is a semi-automatic short-barreled configuration featuring the same 5.5-inch barrel as the selective fire submachine gun.
- The Vector SDP (Special Duty Pistol) is a semi-automatic pistol configuration that has a permanently affixed cap with a sling mount in place of a folding stock. There is also a configuration of the Vector SDP fitted with an SB Tactical arm brace called the Vector SDP-SB (Special Duty Pistol – Stabilizing Brace).

The "Enhanced" versions of the Gen II CRB and SBR are also available with collapsing M4-style stock adaptors instead of the standard folding stock (with a Magpul UBR stock included) and a rectangular barrel shroud for the CRB, though these accessories can also be purchased separately.

== Derivatives ==
KRISS announced development of a semi-automatic pistol called the "KRISS KARD" in 2010, using the Super V system in a much smaller package to minimize recoil and muzzle rise in 9×19mm Parabellum and .45 ACP calibers. It does not have a blowback slide, instead it has a T-shaped cocking handle on the rear.

As TDI, KRISS also announced a 12-gauge shotgun called the MVS and a .50 BMG heavy machine gun using a double Super V mechanism called the "Disraptor," but the Disraptor has not been mentioned since their name change, while the MVS was removed from the TDI website in late 2009.

== Users ==
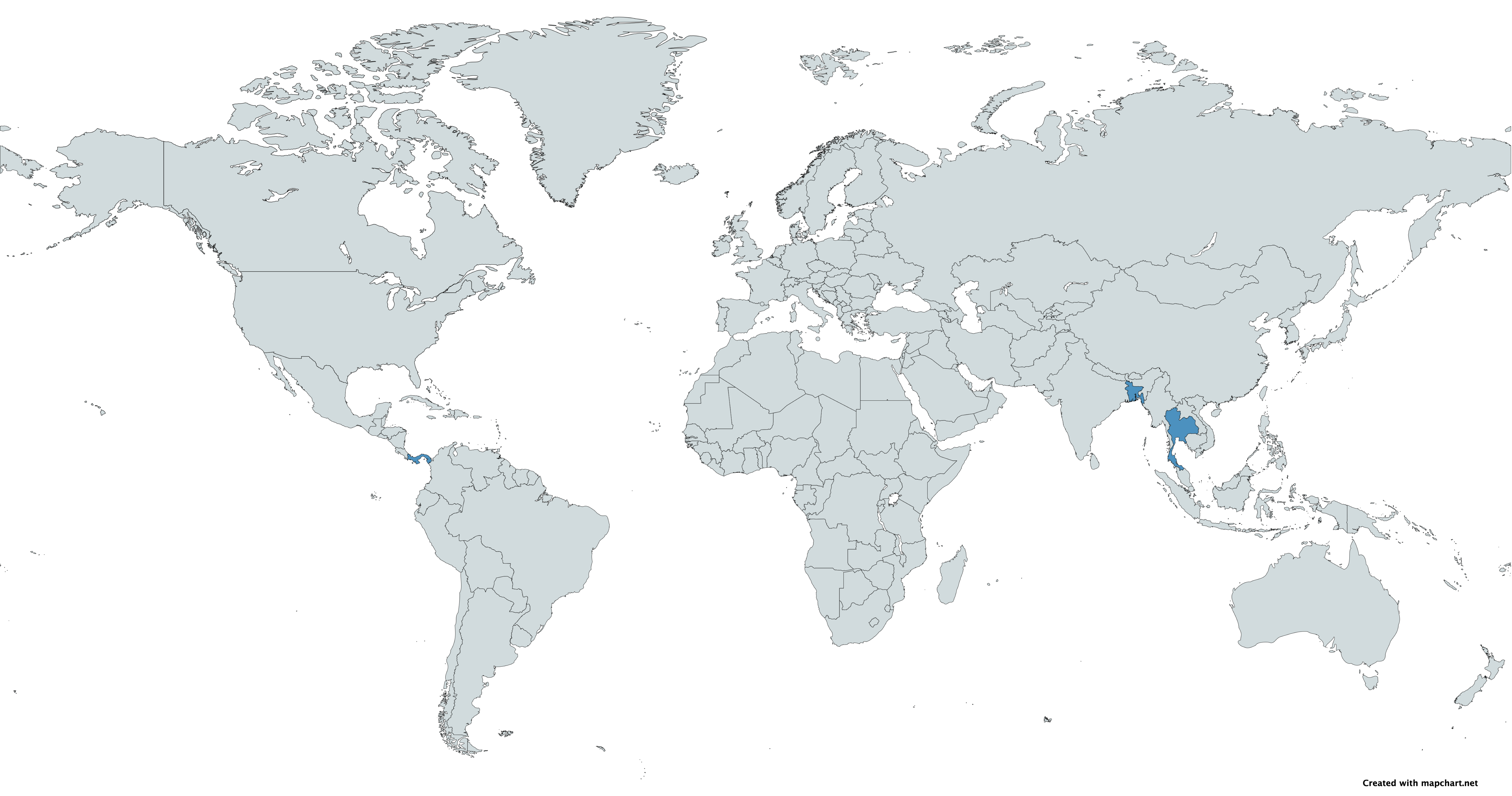
Map with KRISS Vector users in blue

- Bangladesh: Gen II variant used by Bangladesh Army and Gen I variant used by Bangladesh Police. In January 2022, the Directorate General of Defence Purchase floated a tender to procure further 100 Gen II variants.
- Panama: Used by Panamanian National Police.
- Thailand: Used by Royal Thai Army and Royal Thai Police.

== See also ==
- Jatimatic
