= College of Nursing =

A college of nursing is an educational institution that provides nursing education, often part of a university.

College of Nursing may also refer to:

- Australian College of Nursing, a professional body for nurses in Australia, created by merging the Royal College of Nursing, Australia and the College of Nursing,
- Royal College of Nursing, a professional body and trade union for nurses in the UK, founded as the College of Nursing in 1916
- College of Nursing, first nursing college in Dhaka, Bangladesh

== See also ==
- Category:Nursing schools by country
