= KRISS KARD =

- Type: Semi-automatic pistol
- Place of origin: United States

Production history
- Manufacturer: KRISS USA

Specifications
- Cartridge: .45 ACP

The KRISS KARD (KRISS Automatic, Research & Development) is a prototype of a semi-automatic pistol developed by KRISS USA (formerly Transformational Defense Industries (TDI)). It is chambered in .45 ACP, and utilizes the same Super V System as the KRISS Vector, but in a much smaller package to minimize recoil and muzzle rise. It does not have a blowback slide; instead, it has a T-shaped cocking handle on the rear.

== Design and features ==
The KARD is a handgun with a fixed barrel, unlike the more conventional and common tilting barrel system present among most pistols. To provide inertia, a weight is installed at the front of the weapon with a bolt actuator. The weight, which tilts downwards during recoil, provides the same functionality of inertia as a slide on conventional pistols. By the time the bolt and barrel separate, the pressure inside the barrel will be at safe levels. A recoil spring pulls the bolt back into battery and strips a round off the magazine on its return, ready for firing. The recoil mechanism transfers some of the recoil energy downward at the front of the weapon, rather than rearwards like a slide does in conventional pistols. This is to assist in keeping the weapon on target. Due to the fact there is no slide present, optical attachments can be more easily installed on the weapon. A fixed barrel is more accurate than a tilting barrel and assists in making it easier to install muzzle attachments such as suppressors.

Magazine capacity is not mentioned in the promotional materials. However, the magazine interface most likely will use standard 10- or 13-round Glock 21 magazines (like the semi-automatic KRISS Vector CRB, SBR, or SDP models) or their proprietary 25-round MagEx 25+ extended capacity magazine (like the full automatic KRISS Vector SMG). Any other calibers it will be chambered in (like 9 x 19mm Parabellum or .40 Smith & Wesson) will most likely use standard Glock magazines as well.
