= Renaud Kerbrat =

French gun designer and inventor

- Born: Brittany, France
- Occupations: Gun designer and inventor

Renaud Kerbrat is a French gun designer and inventor. He is the owner or co-owner of various patents related to armament and precision technology.

Born in Brittany, France, Renaud Kerbrat worked for various companies manufacturing ammunition and weapons in France and Belgium before establishing a company in Switzerland and creating weapons using his patented designs.

== Firearm design work ==
Renaud Kerbrat has designed a number of firearm actions claimed to eliminate most of the weapon's muzzle jump and recoil, thus making them more controllable during automatic fire. Kerbrat's work as a small arms designer has resulted in several patents being granted by the US Patent Office. The KRISS Vector submachine gun family manufactured in the USA are thus far the only production weapons to use Kerbrat's designs; in this case, the so-called "Super V" system, a blowback action using an off-axis recoil track for the block and bolt.
