= National Institute of Cancer Research and Hospital =

Healthcare organization and hospital in Dhaka, Bangladesh

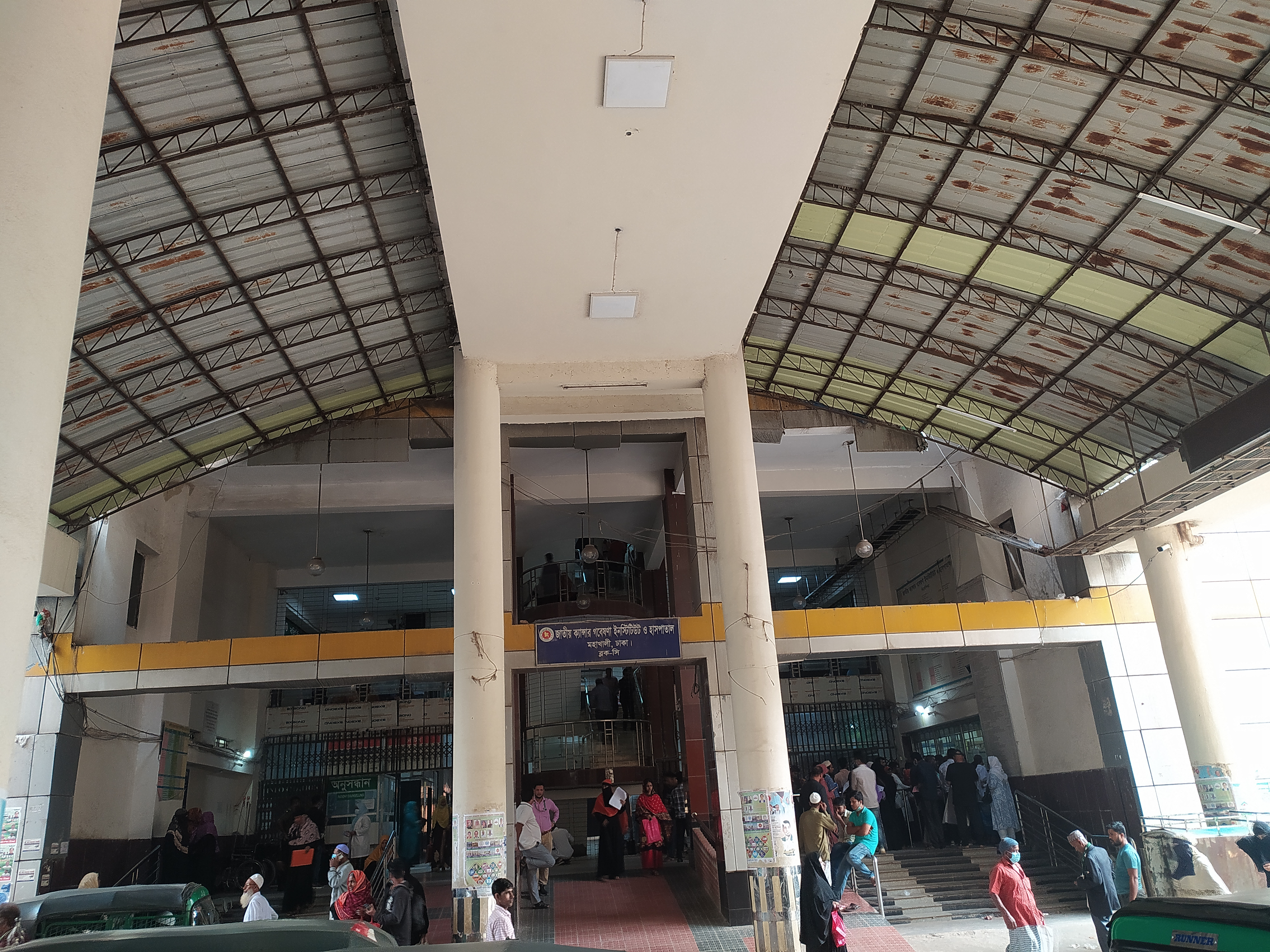
- National Institute of Cancer Research and Hospital

Geography
- Location: Mohakhali, TB Gate Road, Dhaka, Bangladesh
- Coordinates: 23.7783°N 90.4093°E

History
- Opened: 1982

Links
- Website: nicrh.gov.bd
- Lists: Hospitals in Bangladesh

National Institute of Cancer Research & Hospital (NICRH) (Bengali: জাতীয় ক্যান্সার গবেষণা ইনস্টিটিউট ও হাসপাতাল) is dedicated to cancer patient management, education and research. This is the only tertiary level center of the country engaged in multidisciplinary cancer patient management. It started its activity in a tin-shade building of Dhaka Medical College and Hospital in 1982, soon it is shifted to the present location at Mohakhali in 1986. According to a Memorandum of Understanding signed between the Ministry of Health and the Rotary Club of Dhaka the latter built the Rotary Cancer Detection Unit (RCDU) and the Cancer Institute started working as an outdoor cancer detection unit only. In 1991, 50 bed indoor facilities incorporated. In 1994 the cancer institute renamed as National Institute of Cancer Research & Hospital (NICRH) and the first radiation treatment was applied to a patient in 1995 with a Cobalt 60 Teletherapy machine. With the provision of support from the Saudi Fund for Development (SFD), the up-gradation works of this Institute to 300 bedded Center has been completed. In April 2015 it was upgraded to a 300-bed hospital. In 2019 the Health Minister Jahid Maleque M.P. consented to convert NICRH as a 500-bed hospital and the work is almost completed.

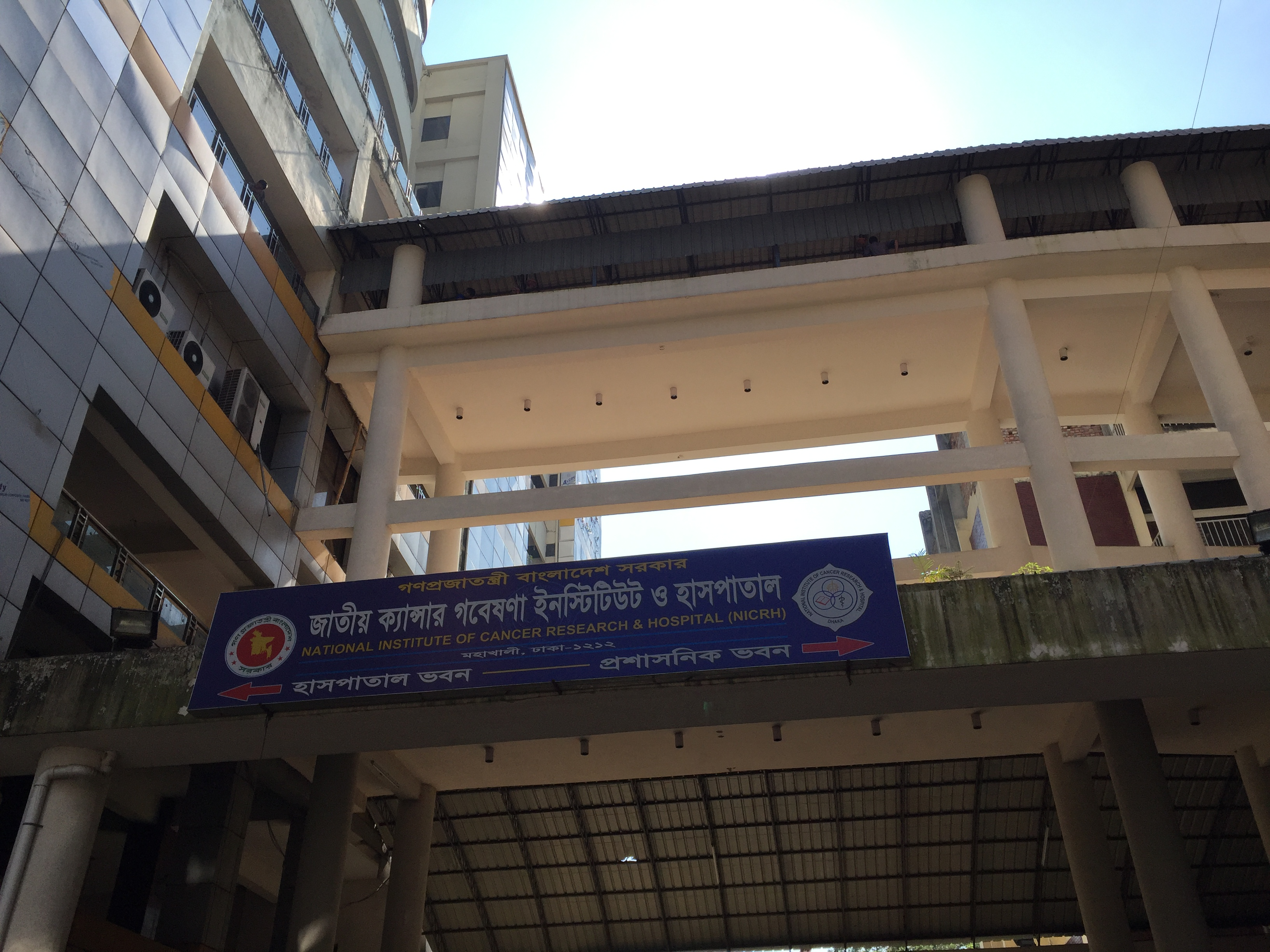
NICRH main view

NICRH offers the following courses:

- MD in Radiation Oncology
- MD in Medical Oncology
- MS in Surgical Oncology

== Activities ==
- All diagnostic activities- for cancer detection
- All kinds of treatments- surgery, radiotherapy, chemotherapy, etc.
- Hospital Based Cancer Registry
- It has formulated National Guidelines for high-quality, cost-effective cancer treatment plans for 4 common cancers of our country.
- Different training programs- for health professionals –histopathologists, gynecologists, nurses, technologists, community leaders, etc.
- Organizing tobacco prevention & cessation programs in the community.
- Participation in national activities- such as observance of World Cancer Day, World Pediatric Cancer Day, No Tobacco Day, Breast & Cervical cancer awareness month, and chalking out of special Breast Cancer Screening Campaign in the victory month of December from 2015.
- Telemedicine services
- Publication of NICRH journal
- Palliative care services
- Academic activities

== Departments of NICRH ==
- Department of Radiation Oncology
- Department of Medical Oncology
- Department of Surgical Oncology
- Department of Gyanecological Oncology
- Department of Cancer Epidemiology
- Department of Haematology
- Department of Pediatric Haematology & Oncology
- Department of Radiology & Imaging
- Department of Histopathology
- Department of Cytopathology
- Department of Laboratory Medicine
- Department of Microbiology
- Department of Immunology and Molecular Biology
- Department of Blood Transfusion Medicine
- Department of ENT Oncology
- Department of Dental and Faciomaxillary Surgical Oncology
- Department of Plastic and Reconstructive Surgical Oncology
- Department of Orthopedic Surgical Oncology
- Department of Genito-urinary Surgical Oncology
- Department of Anesthesiology
- Department of Physical medicine & rehabilitation
- Department of Psychotherapy
- Department of Emergency Oncology
