= National Institute of Diseases of the Chest and Hospital =

Research institute in Dhaka, Bangladesh

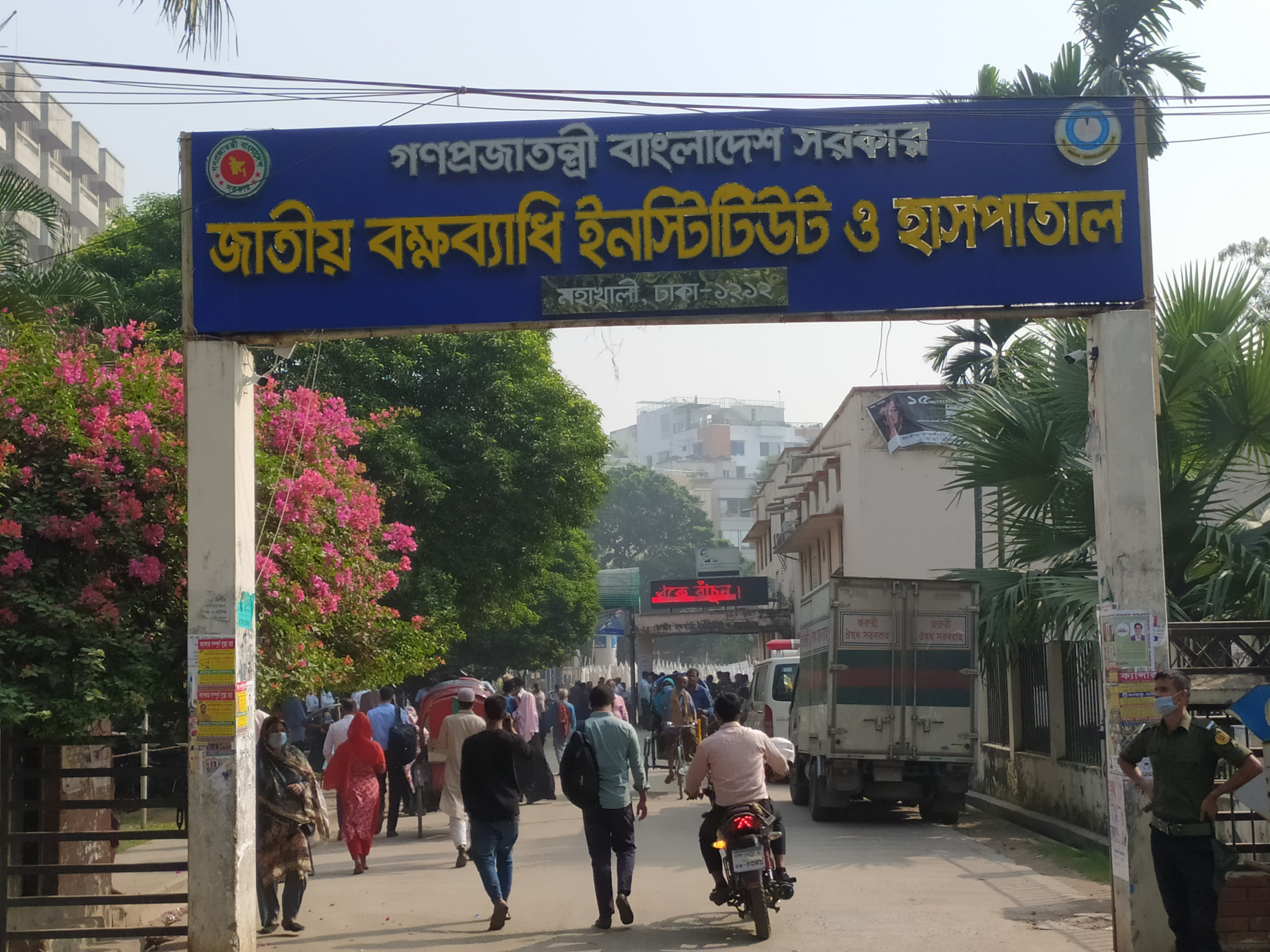
- National Institute of Diseases of the Chest and Hospital Main Gete

Geography
- Location: Mohakhali, Dhaka 1212, Bangladesh
- Coordinates: 23.7776°N 90.4090°E

Organisation
- Type: Specialist

Services
- Speciality: Chest diseases

History
- Opened: 1955

Links
- Website: www.nidch.gov.bd
- Lists: Hospitals in Bangladesh

National Institute of Diseases of the Chest and Hospital (NIDCH) (Bengali: জাতীয় বক্ষব্যাধি ইনস্টিটিউট ও হাসপাতাল) is a state supported research institute and hospital in Bangladesh. It was established in 1955 as TB Hospital. In 1962 it was upgraded as National Chest Diseases Institute.

== Courses ==
The institute provides postgraduate training for the students of Diploma in Tuberculosis and Chest Diseases (DTCD), Doctor of Medicine (MD, Chest), FCPS, MS, and also undergraduate teaching in tuberculosis for the students of different medical colleges.

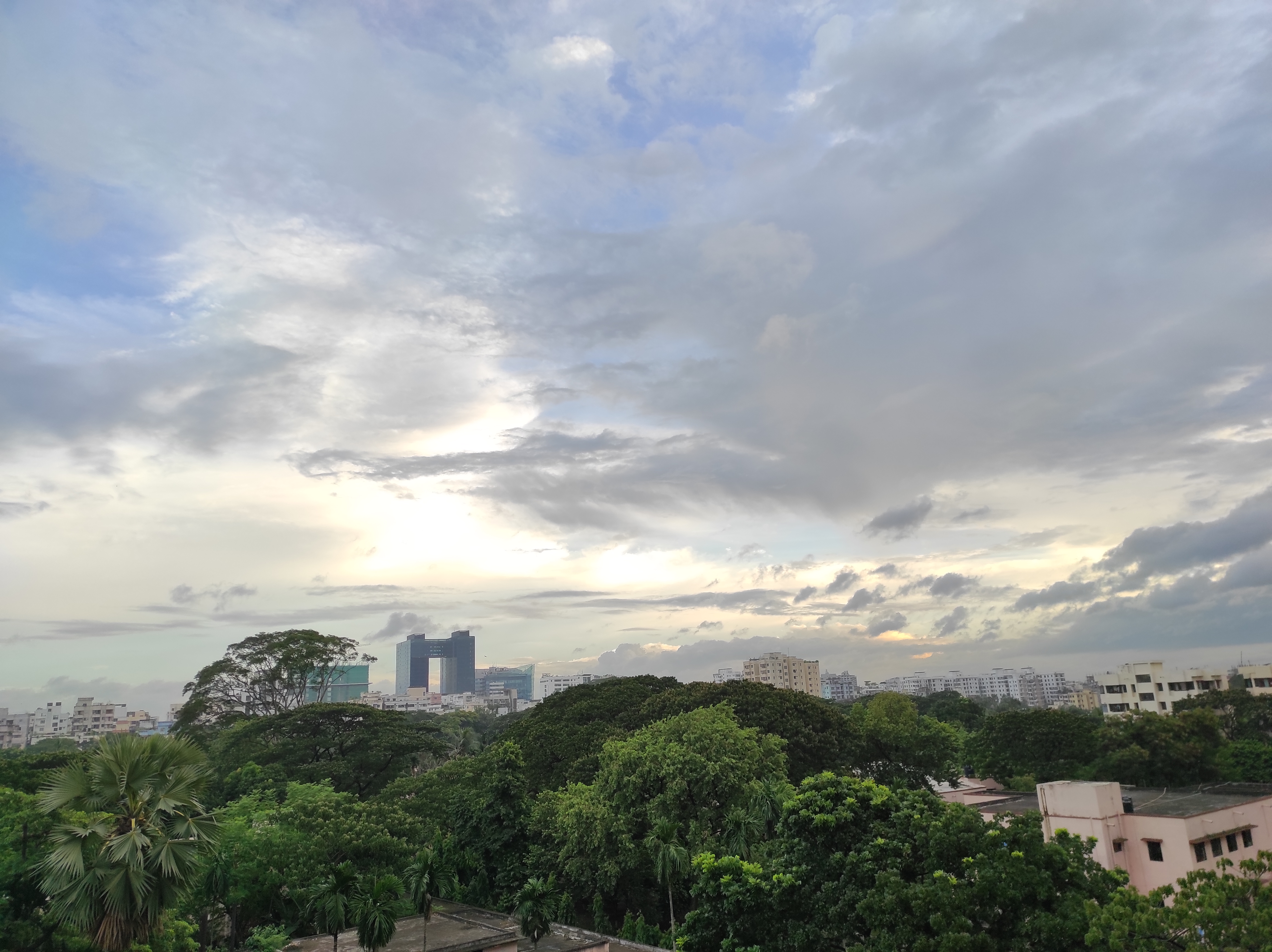
Skyline of NIDCH

== Objectives ==
These are:

- To provide diagnosis and treatment facilities for tuberculosis and chest diseases.
- To conduct postgraduate courses and training facilities for DTCD, MD (Chest), MS (Thoracic Surgery), FCPS (Pulmonary), FCPS (Thoracic Surgery).
- To provide specialized training facilities for the chest specialists, nurses, medical technologists and field workers.
- To conduct research activities in the field of chest diseases.
- To provide surgical treatment of chest diseases.
- To provide and co-ordinate management of the avian influenza, pandemic H1N1.

== Criticism ==
There are allegations about lack of proper logistics support and skilled manpower. Such as the Intensive Care Unit in the hospital was not operative because of lack of ability of the hospital to maintain it.
