= College of Nursing, Dhaka =

Research institute in Bangladesh

College of Nursing, Mohakhali, Dhaka
- Formation: 1970
- Headquarters: Mohakhali, Dhaka, Bangladesh
- Region served: Bangladesh
- Official language: Bengali
- Main organ: Bangladesh Nursing and Midwifery Council
- Parent organization: Directorate General of Health Services
- Website: www.bnmc.gov.bd

College of Nursing (Bengali: সেবা মহাবিদ্যালয়) is the first nursing college in Bangladesh and is located in Mohakhali, Dhaka, Bangladesh.

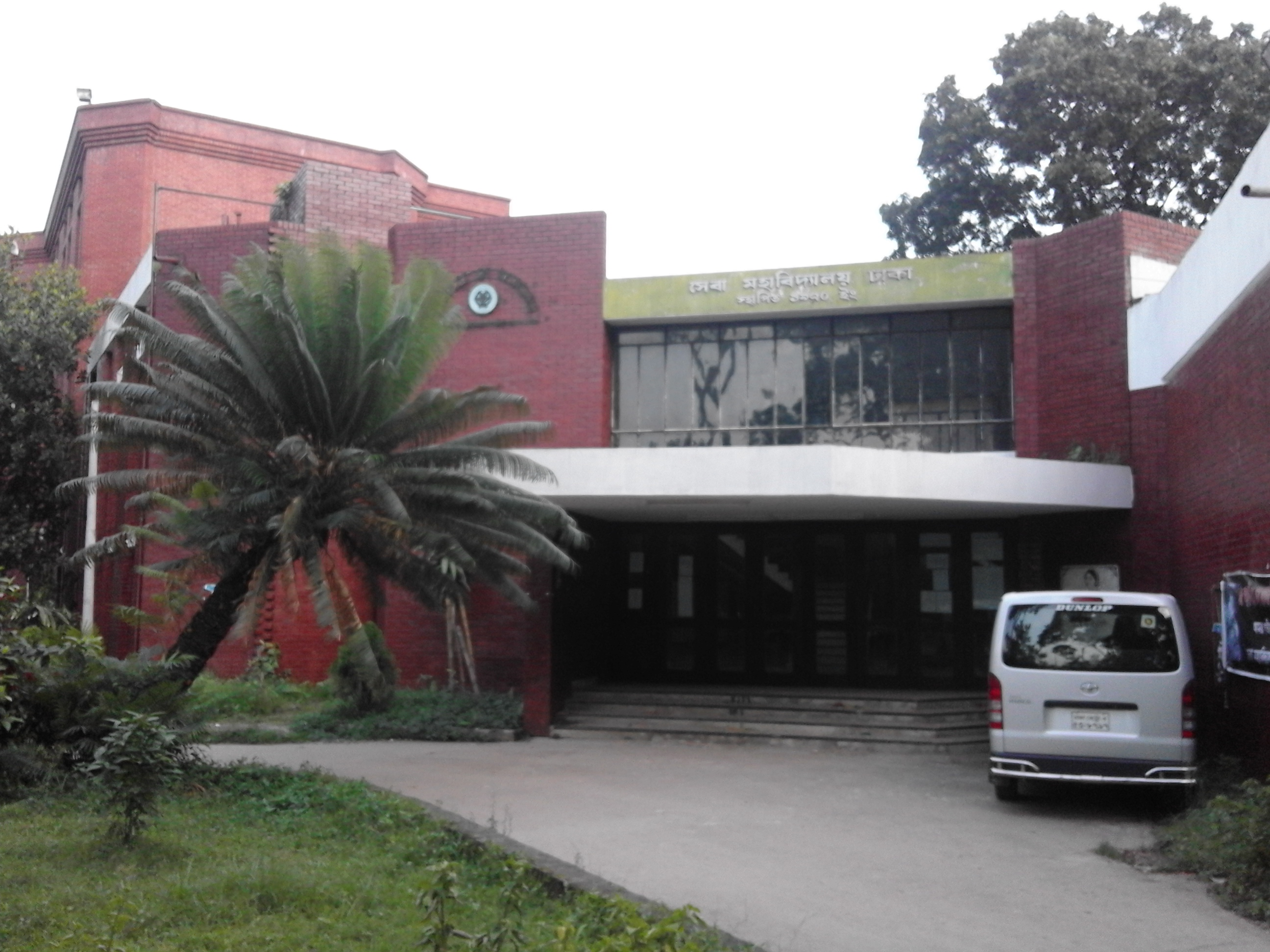
College of Nursing, Mohakhali, Dhaka

Any candidate who has passed from any nursing institute of the country can get admission in this college on the basis of merit. But must have three years of practical experience in professional work.

== History ==
The College of Nursing was established in 1970 in Mohakhali, Dhaka. In 1978, the college became affiliated with the University of Dhaka. In the 1990s, the college diploma program was suspended, and it now offers a BSc in Nursing and a BSc in Public Health Nursing.
