= Civil Aviation School and College, Tejgaon =

College in Dhaka, Bangladesh

Civil Aviation School and College, Tejgoan
- সিভিল এভিয়েশন স্কুল এন্ড কলেজ, তেজগাঁও

Location
- Bir Uttom Ziaur Rahman Road, Tejgaon, Dhaka, Bangladesh; 1215; 23°46′30″N 90°23′31″E

Information
- Type: College
- Motto: "Read in the Name of Your Lord"
- Established: July 22, 1963
- School board: Dhaka Education Board
- School district: Dhaka
- Principal: Group Captain Tasin Ferdous Ahmed Khan
- Staff: 90
- Grades: 1-12
- Enrollment: 3,500
- Language: Bengali, English
- Campus size: 1.71 acres
- Campus type: Urban
- Colours: Navy Blue School Pant White Shirt School & College Gray College Pant
- Website: casc.edu.bd

Civil Aviation School and College, Tejgoan (Bengali: সিভিল এভিয়েশন স্কুল এন্ড কলেজ, তেজগাঁও) is an educational institution located in Tejgaon, Dhaka, Bangladesh. Situated on Old Airport Road, the school is operated by the Civil Aviation Authority of Bangladesh (CAAB). It caters to students from primary through higher secondary levels and offers instruction in both Bengali and English.

== History ==
Established on July 22, 1963, as Staff Welfare High School, the institution was renamed Civil Aviation High School on July 23, 1996. It became Civil Aviation School and College on June 19, 2018, following an upgrade to include higher secondary education. The English medium classes commenced in 2017, and the school began offering eleventh-grade classes in 2020.

== Academics ==
Civil Aviation School and College provides education from Kindergarten through Grade 12. It is divided into three main divisions: Primary (KG to Class 5), Junior Secondary (Class 6 to Class 10), and Higher Secondary (Class 11 and Class 12). The curriculum covers Humanities, Science, and Business Studies.

== Extracurricular activities ==
The school offers a range of extracurricular activities, including:

- CASC BNCC Air Wing
- CASC Photography Club
- CASC Science Club
- CASC Quiz Club
- CASC Debate Club
- CASC Literature and recitation club

== Facilities ==
The campus covers 1.71 acres and includes: - 49 sections in Bengali medium and 5 sections in English medium - 1 computer lab - 6 science laboratories - 1 library

== Administration ==
The institution is governed by a managing committee approved by the Dhaka Education Board. The principal is Group Captain Tasin Ferdous Ahmed Khan, and the governing body is chaired by Air Commodore Sadikur Rahman Chowdhury.

== Gallery ==
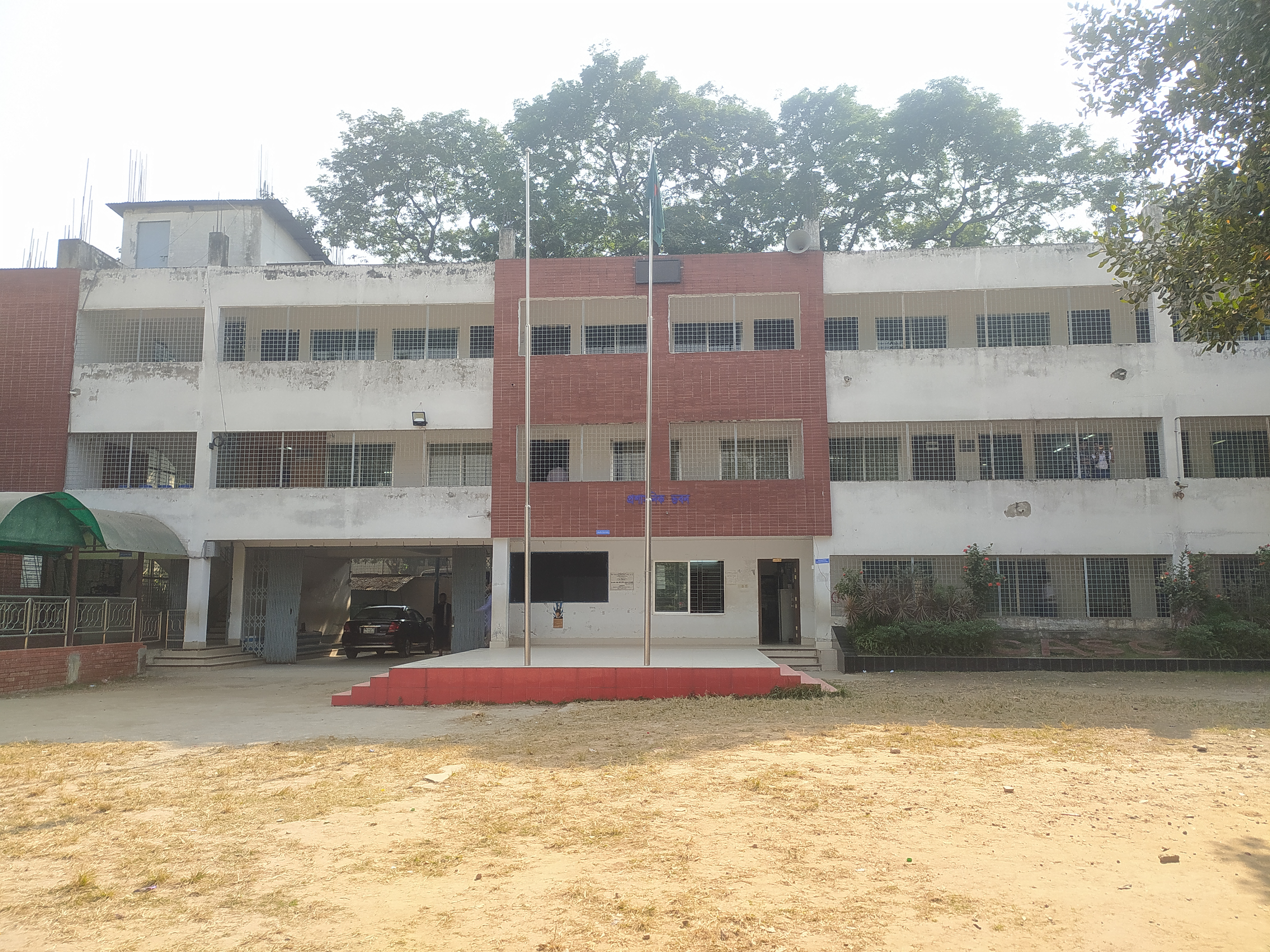
Civil Aviation School and College Administrative Building

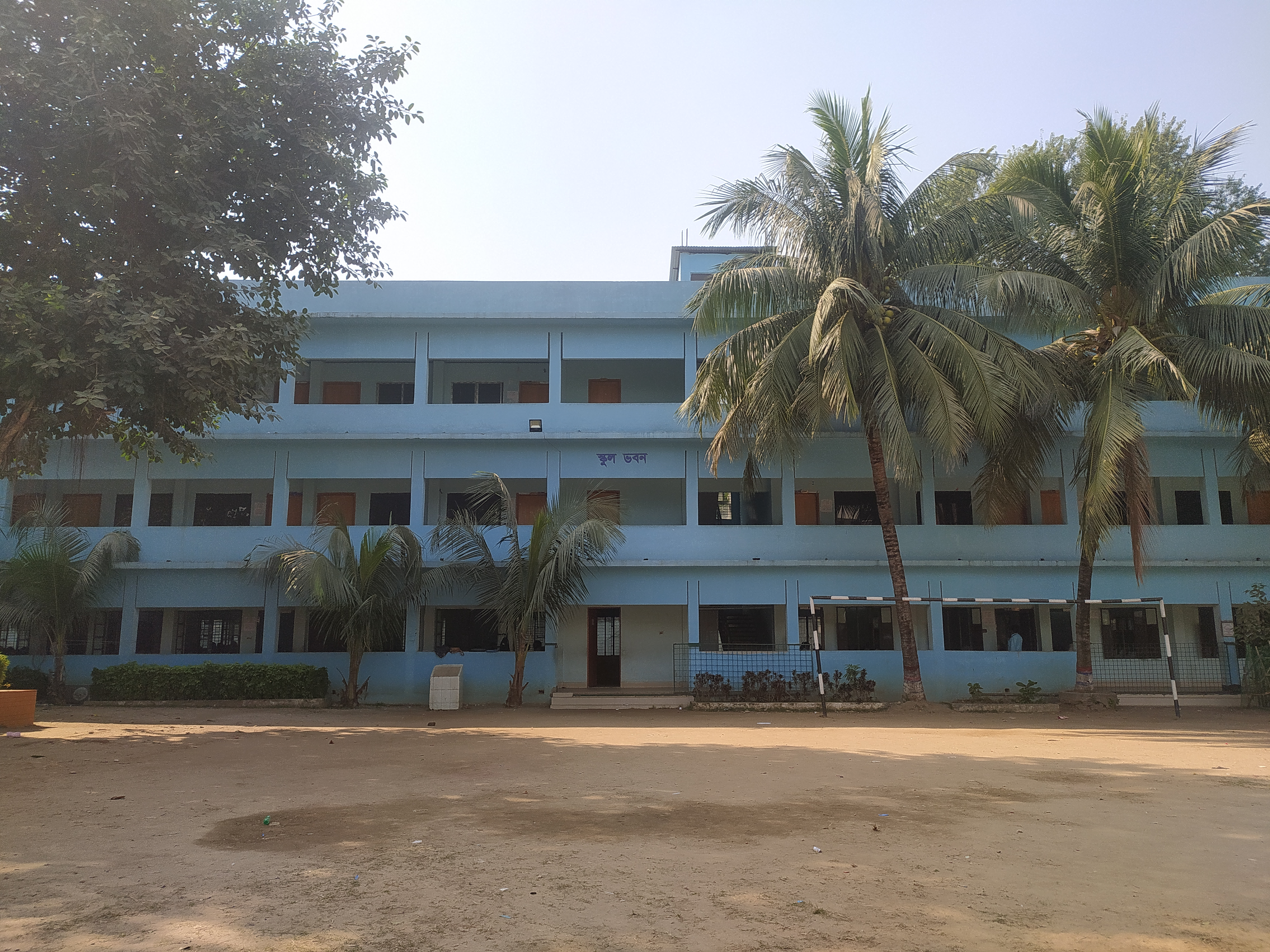
Civil Aviation School and College School Building

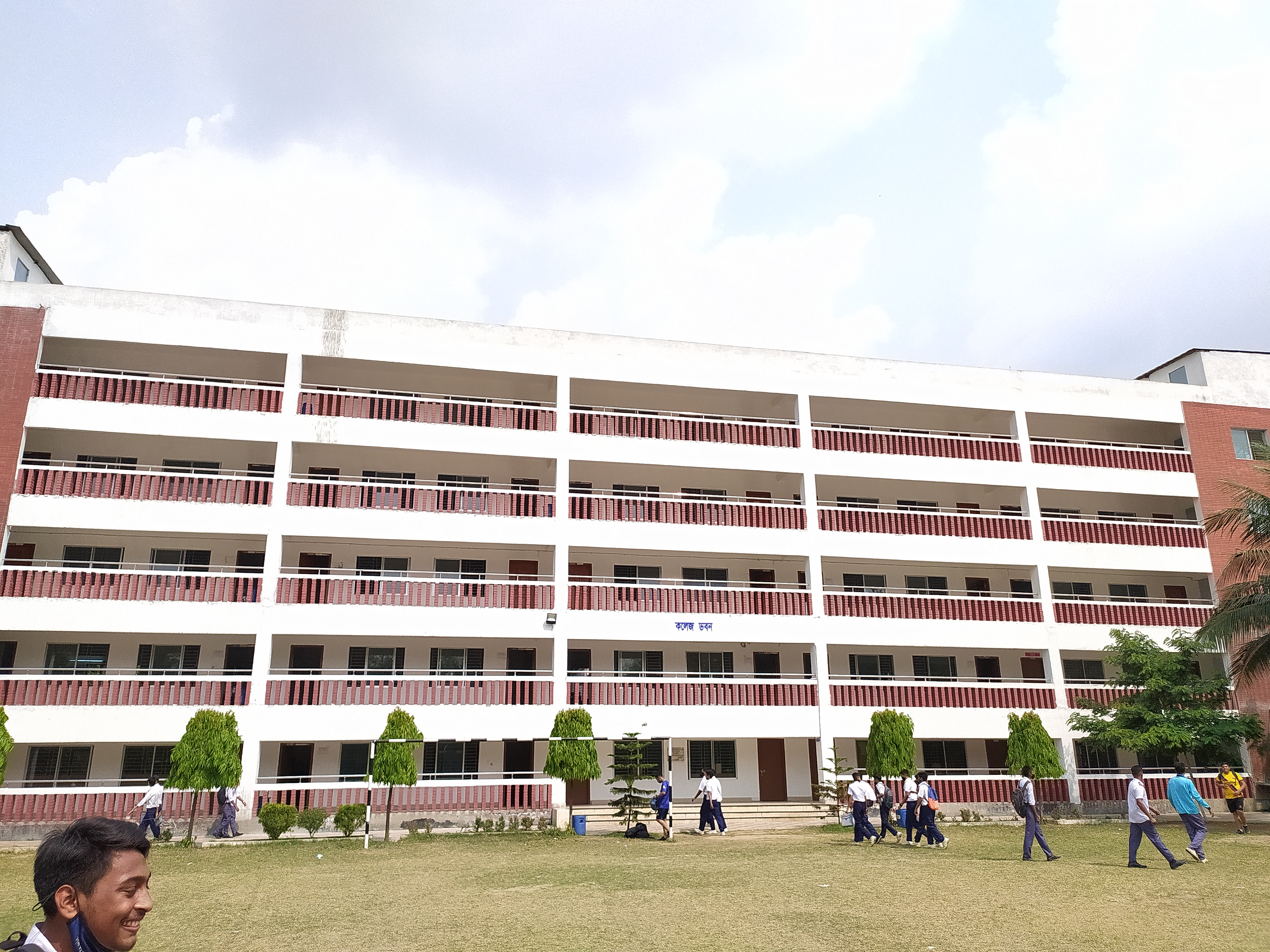
Civil Aviation School and College Building

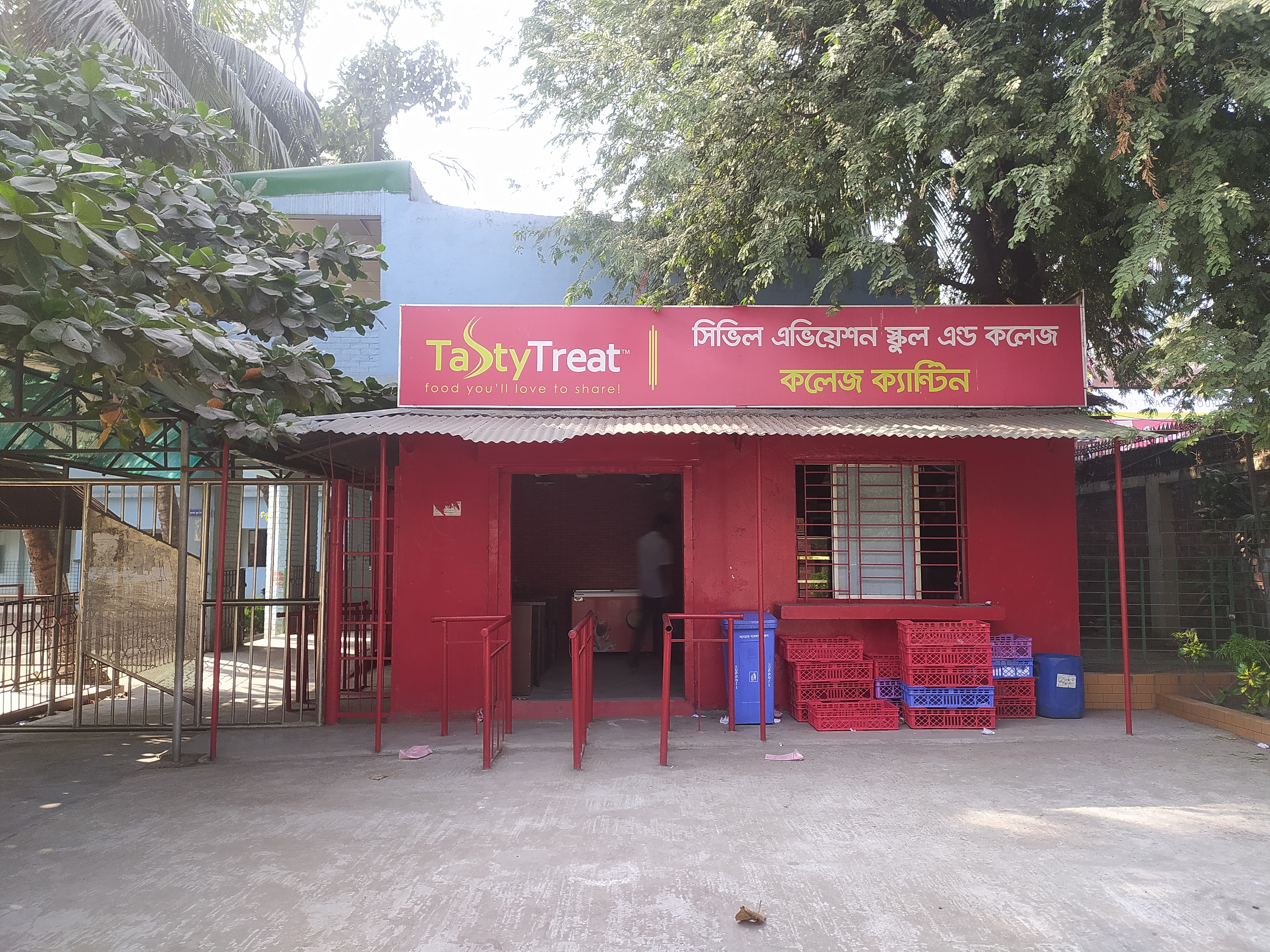
Civil Aviation School and College Canteen

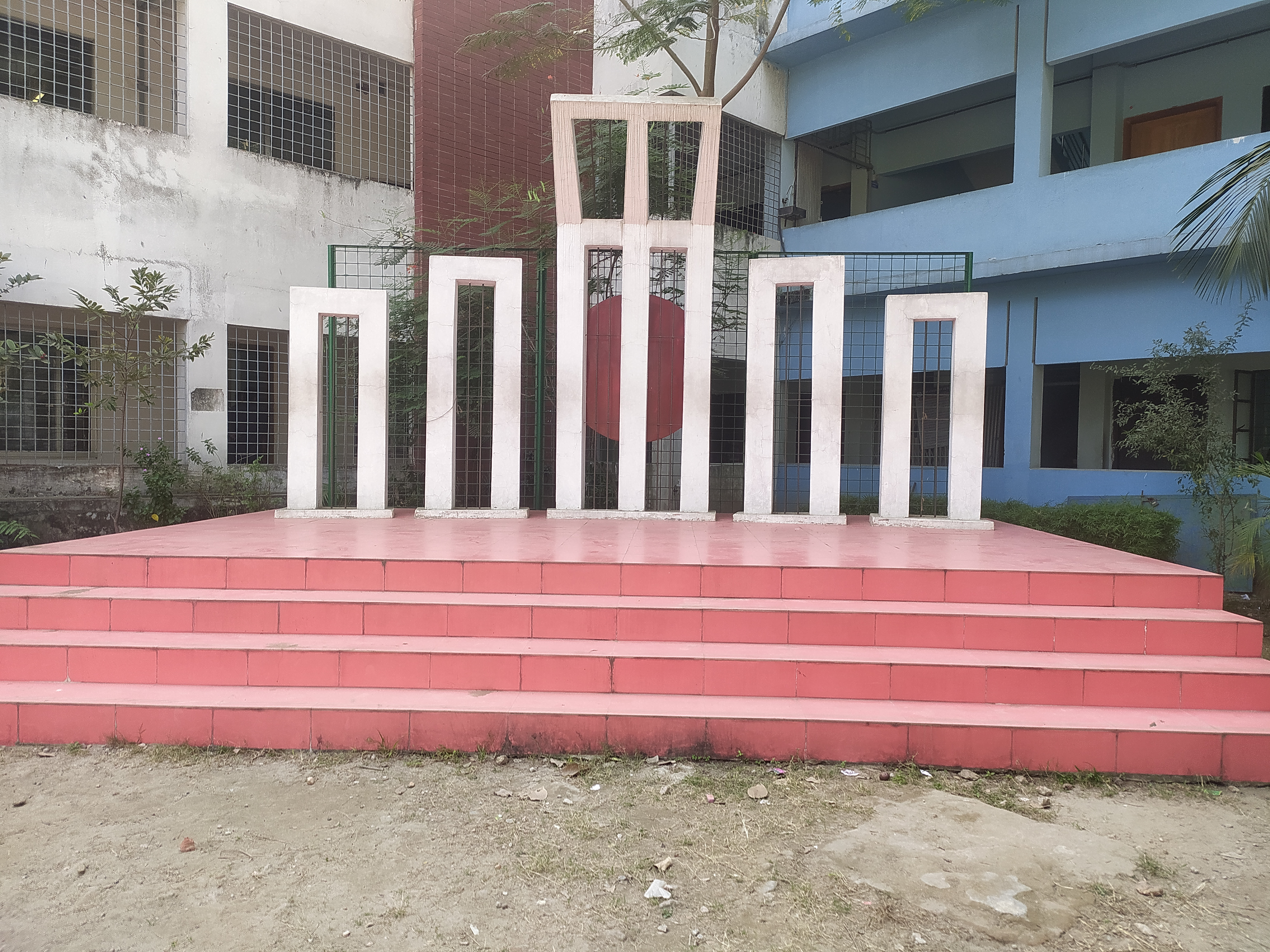
Shaheed Minar of Civil Aviation School and College
