= Mohakhali Interdistrict Bus Terminal =

Bus station in Mohakhali

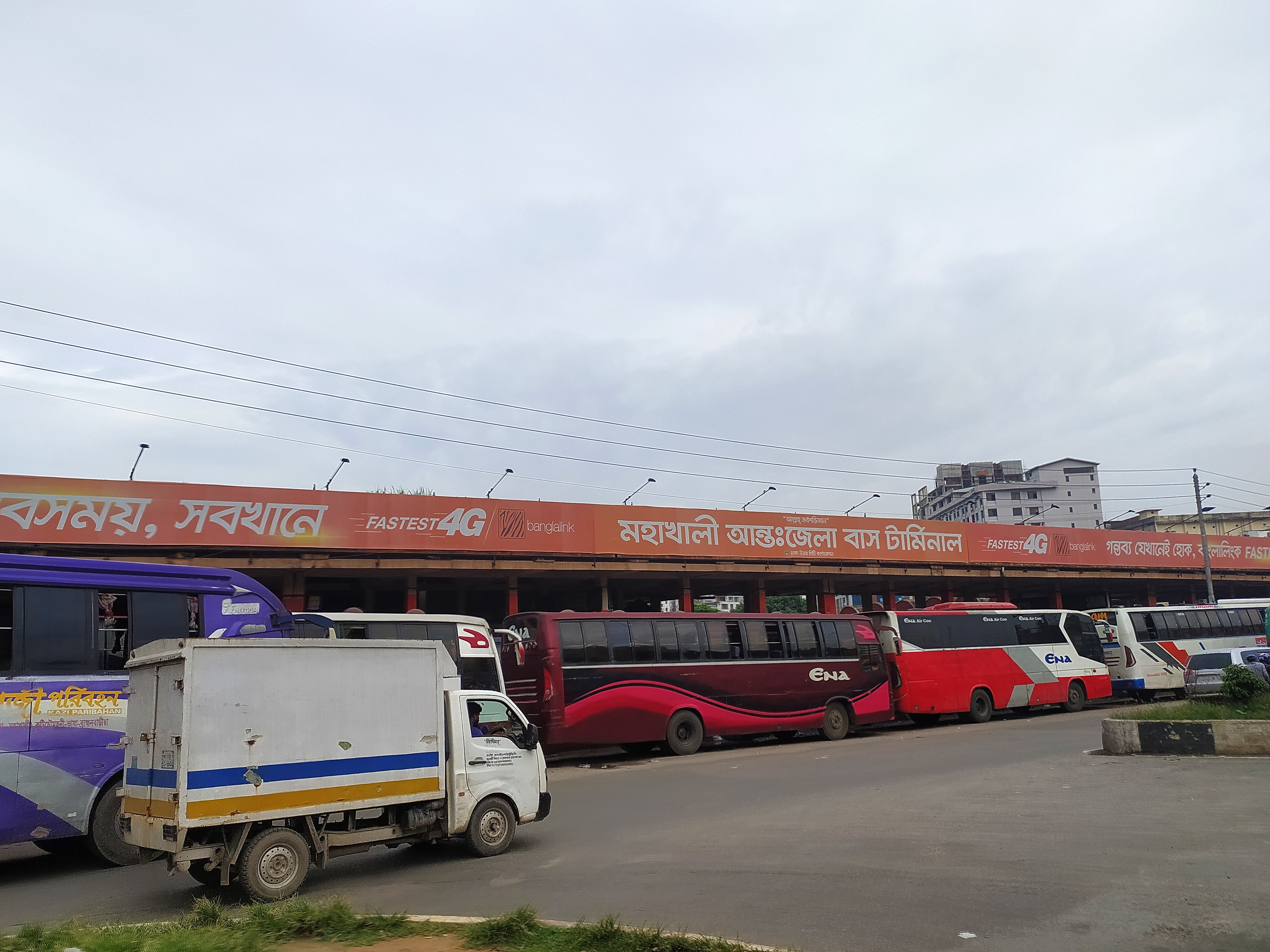
- Mohakhali Interdistrict Bus Terminal

General information
- Location: Mohakhali, Dhaka
- Coordinates: 23°46′22.63″N 90°24′04.90″E
Location

Mohakhali Interdistrict Bus Terminal or Mohakhali Bus Terminal is one of three main inter-city bus stations in Dhaka, opened in 1984. Located in the Mohakhali neighbourhood, it primarily serves destinations in northern Bangladesh, including Tangail, Mymensingh, Netrokona, Jamalpur, Sherpur, Kishoreganj and Bogura.

Renovation of the terminal was completed in 2005. The 15 crore taka ($2.3M) rehabilitation was part of the Dhaka Urban Transport Project, funded by a World Bank loan.

The 36,400-square-metre (9.0-acre) site can simultaneously accommodate 300 buses. As of 2015, companies operate 800 daily trips from the terminal, on 60 different routes.

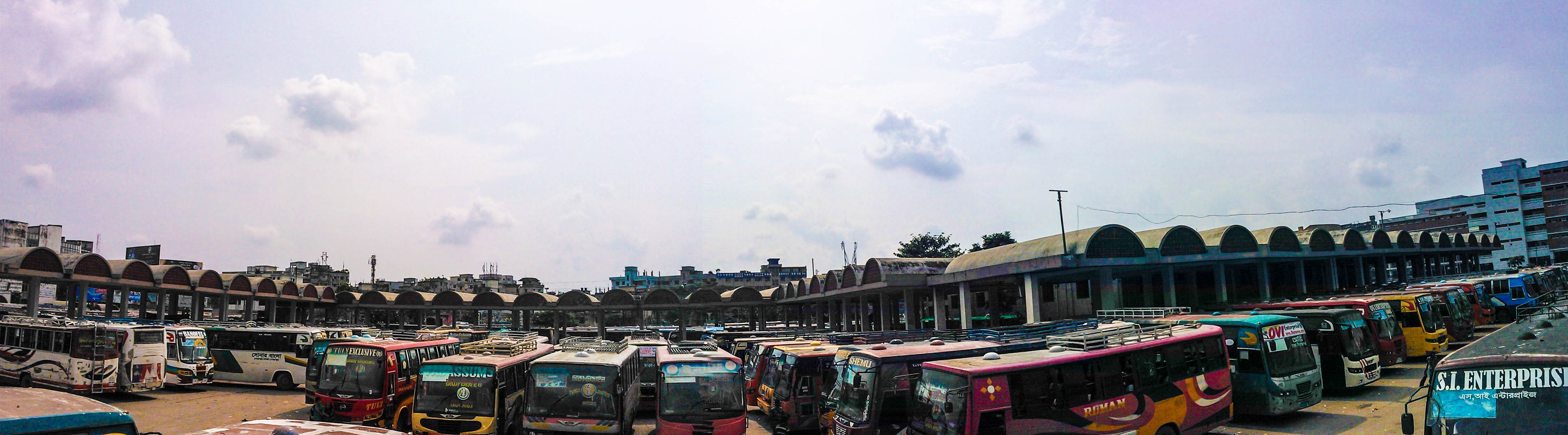
Mohakhali Interdistrict Bus Terminal panorama
