= Directorate General of Defence Purchase (Bangladesh) =

Bangladeshi agency

- প্রতিরক্ষা ক্রয় মহা পরিদপ্তর
- Insignia of the DGDP

Agency overview
- Formed: 8 January 1972; 54 years ago
- Headquarters: Bir Uttom Ziaur Rahman Road, Tejgaon, Dhaka-1216, Bangladesh
- Annual budget: Classified
- Agency executives: Major general Mohammad Saadat Hossain, Director General; Major Firoz Wahid, BGBMS, General Staff Officer
- Parent agency: Ministry of Defence
- Website: dgdp.gov.bd

The Directorate General of Defence Purchase or DGDP is a government agency responsible for purchases related to Bangladesh Armed Forces and is located in Dhaka, Bangladesh.

== History ==
The agency traces its origins to the Director Defence Purchase of Pakistan. The Directorate General of Defence Purchase was established in 1971 after the independence of Bangladesh from Pakistan. There was a purchase wing of Director Defence Purchase (DDP) of the then Pakistan near Dhaka Cantonment. After independence in 1971, DGDP started its journey. The seven Bangladeshi employees of the then DDP wing in Dhaka formed a nucleus and have started the job of DDP. Five more also came back from Pakistan and joined in DDP. At that time, DDP had been working on an ad-hoc basis. On 8 January 1972 under a memorandum of the Ministry of Defence, DDP formed officially and started function from the combined workshop which was located at Dhaka Cantonment. During that time, DDP was accommodated at building number 202 and 208 in a combined workshop in Dhaka Cantonment.

On 9 November 1972, DDP was formed and had started job from a tin shed building which is located near Jahangir gate MP Check Post. On 13 January 1973, DDP was relocated to Cantonment Bazar in Dhaka Cantonment. Directorate General of Defence Purchase in short, DGDP became the new name of the then DDP on 30 March 1976. On 19 April 1977, DGDP again relocated to 110/A Banani which was known as the house of Abdul Monem Khan (the Ex-Governor of East Pakistan). DGDP relocated itself to the present location near Mohakhali in 1981.

With the work volume increased, DGDP was re-structured under the order of the Ministry of Defence on 29 May 1997.

== Functions ==
Functions of DGDP are given below:

- Procurement of defence stores indented by three Services Headquarters and other defence organisations.
- Disposal of surplus serviceable/repairable, obsolete and obsolescent defence stores.
- Liaison with three Services Headquarters, National Board of Revenue, Financial Controller (Defence Purchase), Financial Controllers of three Services, Sadharan Bima Corporation and other concerned organisations in connection with the defence procurement.
- Liaison with Embassies/High Commissions of Bangladesh abroad in connection with defence procurement.
- Liaison with capability of defence oriented local industries and manufacturers.
- Render advice to Prime Minister's Office, Armed Forces Division regarding policy of defence procurement.
