= Mohakhali Flyover =

Flyover in Dhaka, Bangladesh

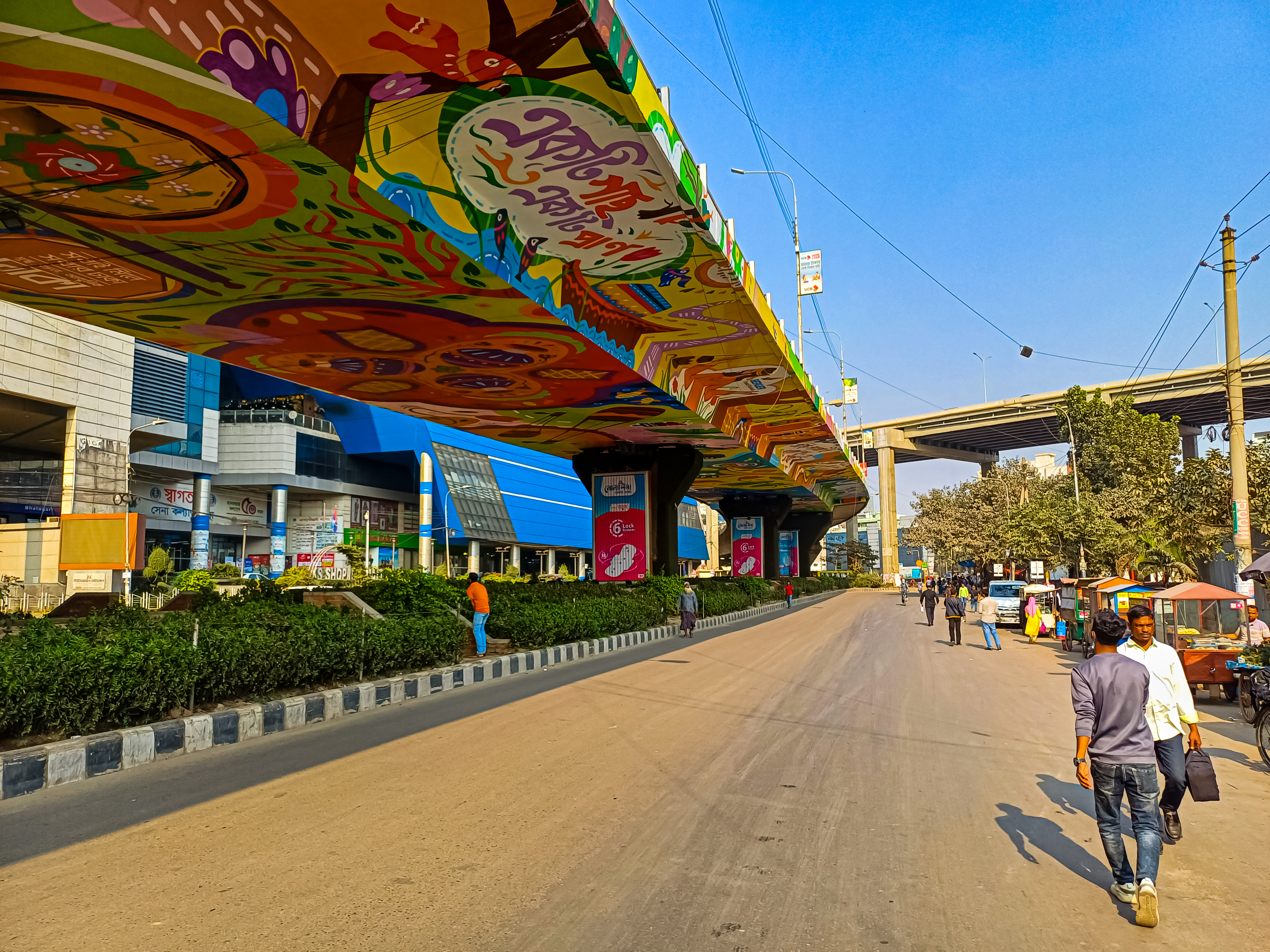
- Coordinates: 23.778200°N 90.397452°E
- Locale: Mohakhali, Dhaka

Characteristics
- Total length: 1.12 km

History
- Constructed by: First Metallurgical Construction Company of China
- Construction start: December 2001
- Construction end: November 2004
- Construction cost: 114 crore Taka

Location
- Interactive map of Mohakhali Flyover

Mohakhali Flyover (Bengali: মহাখালী উড়ালসেতু) is an overpass located at Mohakhali in Dhaka, the capital of Bangladesh. Upon its completion in November 2004, it was the first flyover to open to traffic in Bangladesh. Although the construction of Khilgaon flyover had started earlier, Mohakhali flyover was completed first and inaugurated before Khilgaon flyover, making Mohakhali the country's first functional flyover.

Construction of the Mohakhali flyover began in December 2001, and it was opened to traffic in November 2004. The length of this flyover is 1.12 km and it was built with the help of 19 pillars. There is a 7.5m wide road for vehicular movement and a 0.6m footpath on both sides. The flyover took about three years to complete at a cost of about 114 crore taka.

== Gallery ==
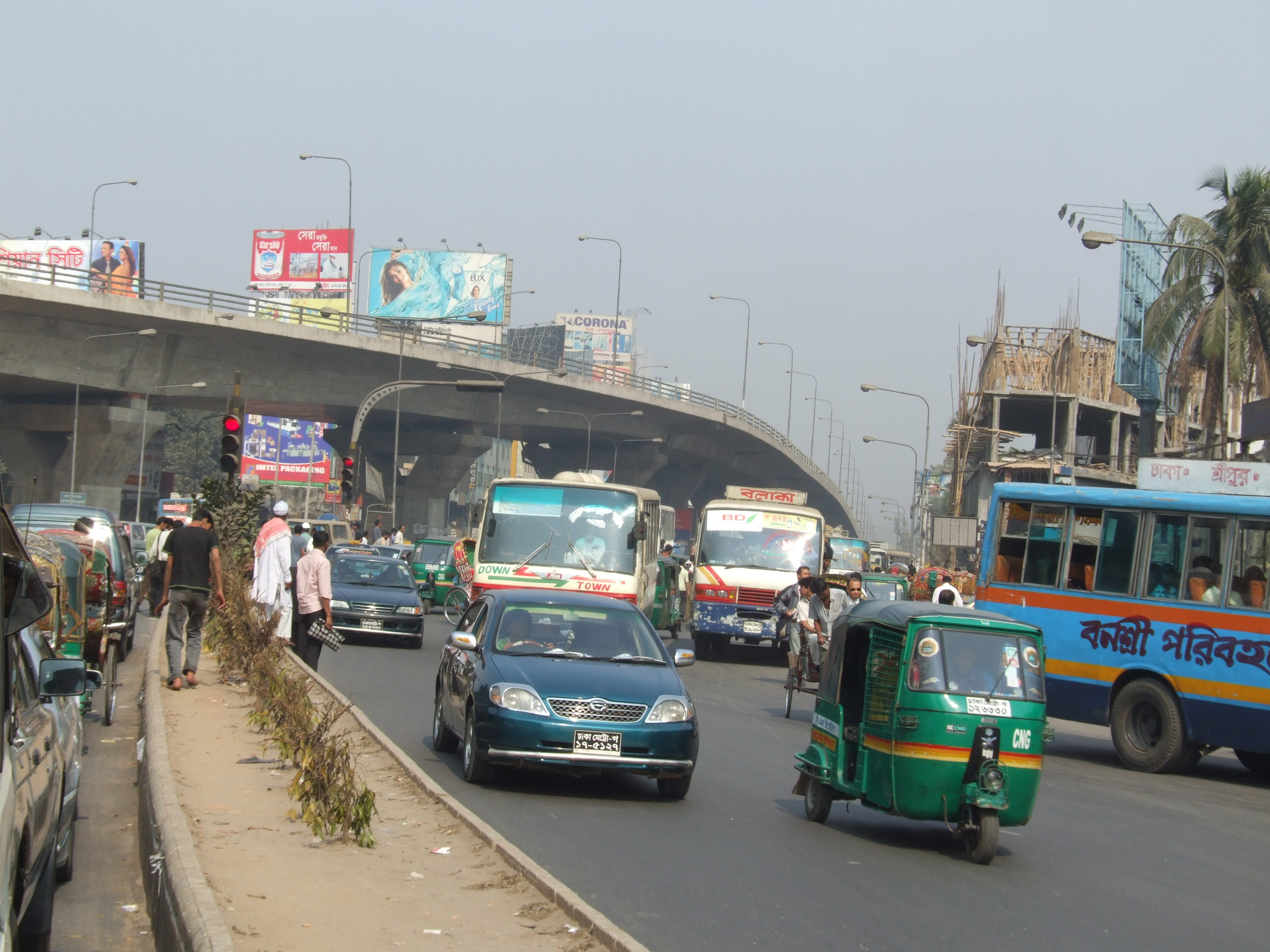

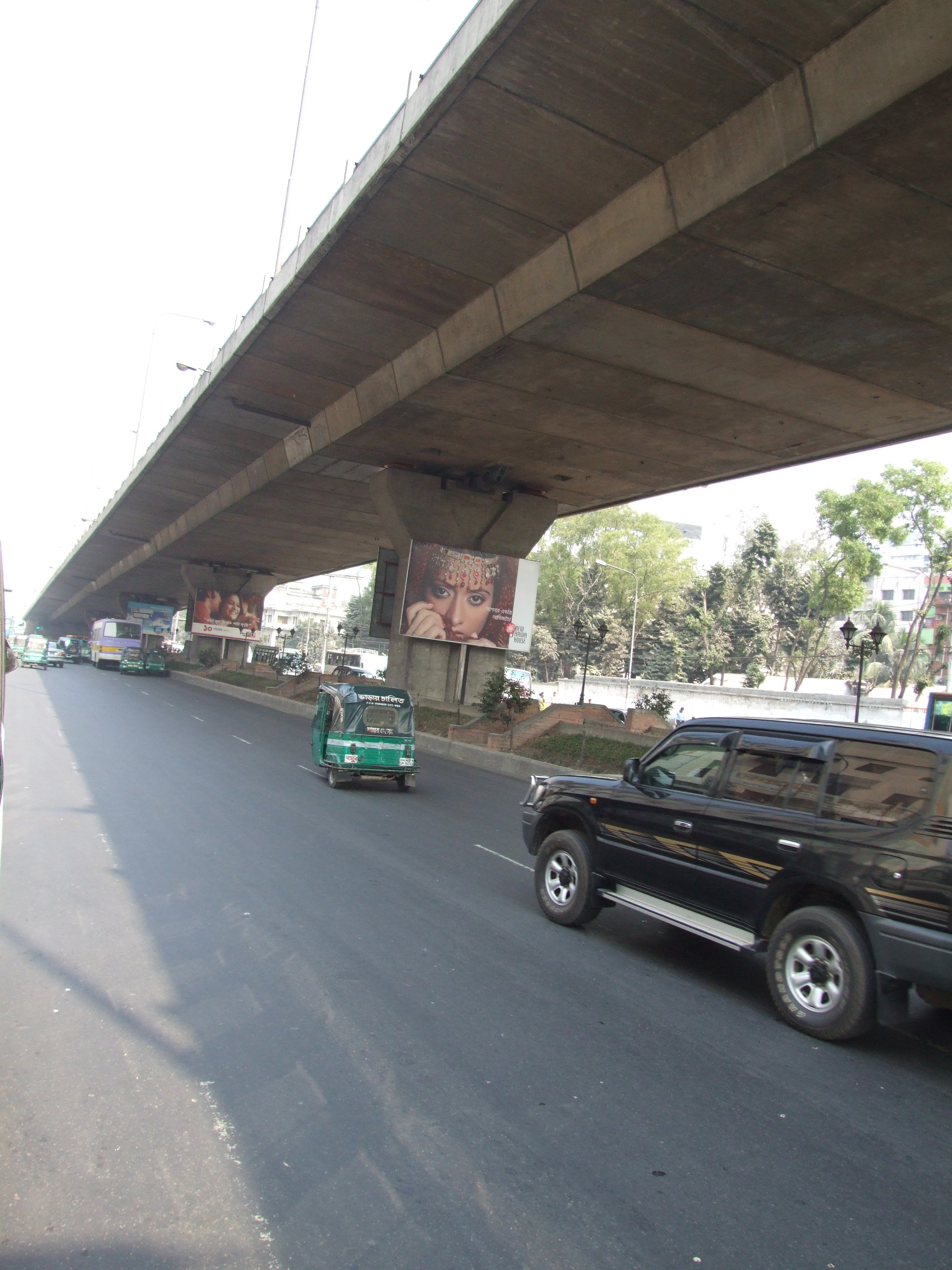

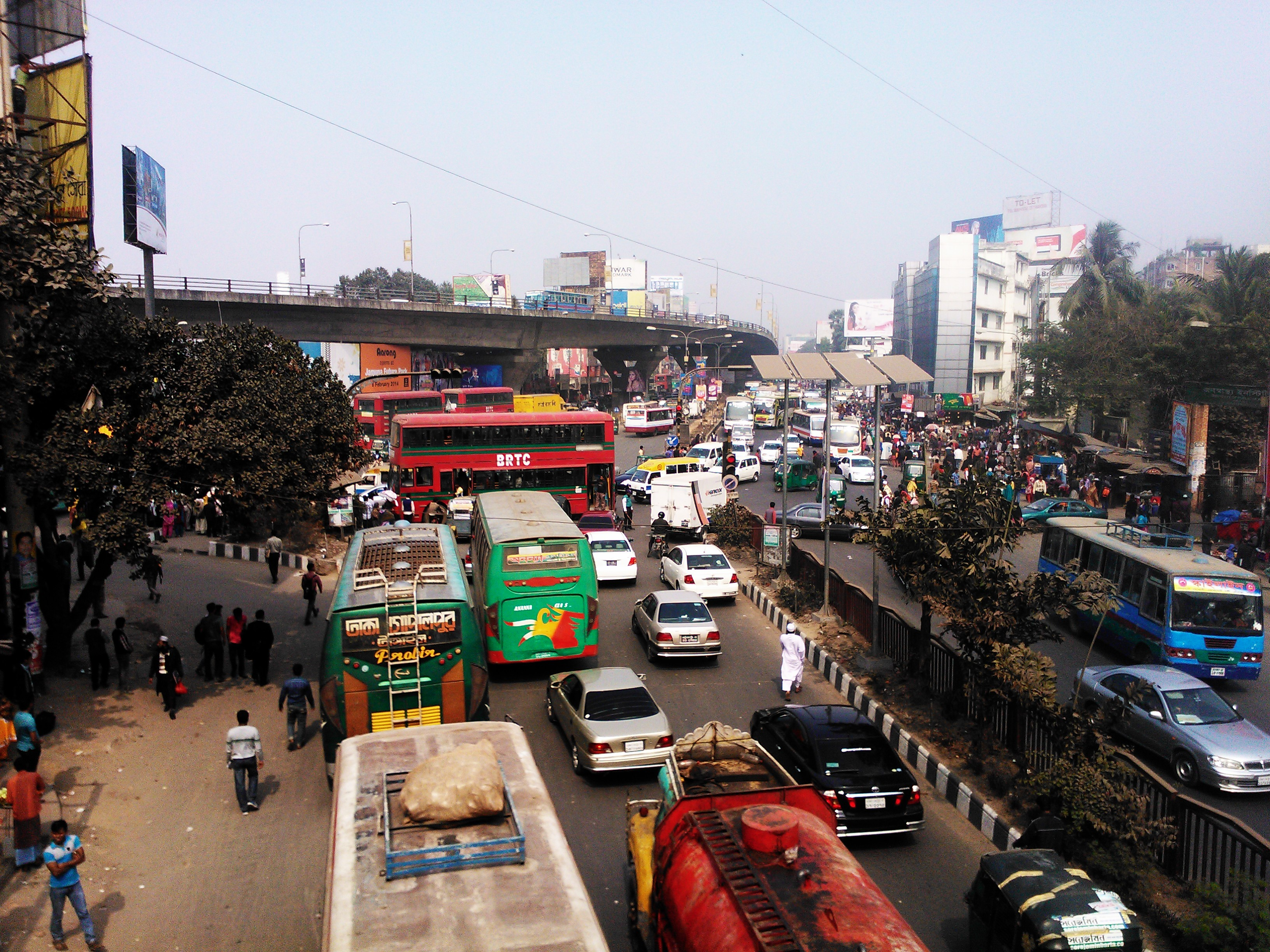

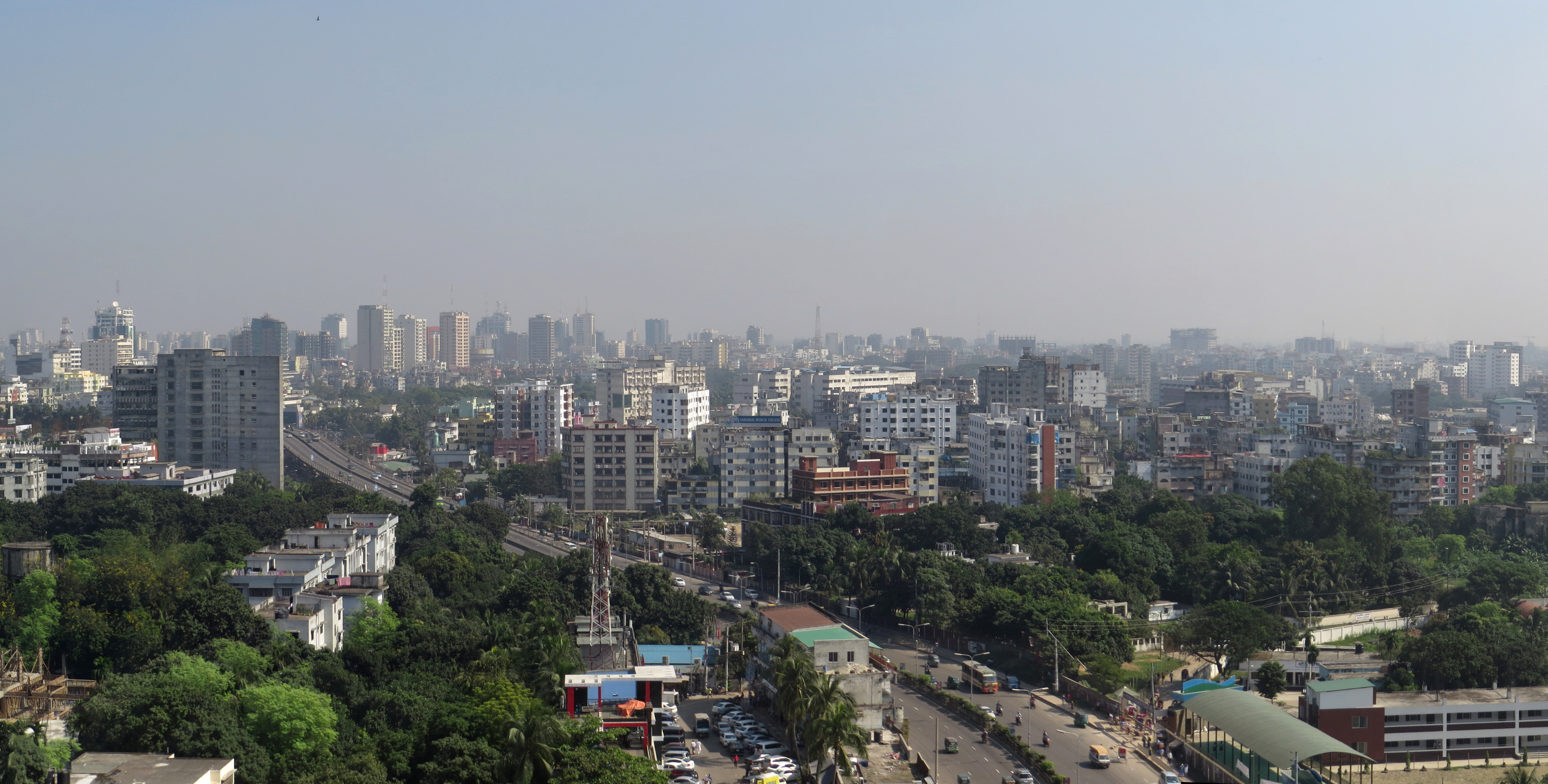
