= China Shandong International Economic & Technical Cooperation Group =

Chinese construction company

China Shandong Economic & Technical Cooperation Group Co., Ltd.
- Founded: 1984
- Headquarters: Jinan, China
- Parent: Shandong Hi-Speed Group (SDHS)
- Website: china-csi.com.cn

China Shandong International Economic & Technical Cooperation Group (CSI) is a Chinese construction company that specializes in international engineering contracts in Chad, Serbia, and other countries. For contracting work it often executes international aid projects for the Chinese government. It also invests in agriculture projects, being a major investor in cotton in Sudan.

== Chad ==
The company is a major construction contractor in Chad having built a number of projects. It also works in projects in technical and agricultural fields, one of three such Chinese companies in 2011 that took part on projects.

One completed construction project is the House of Women, a foreign aid project of China in 2014. The $12 million women's center is equipped with a 500-seat conference room, meeting halls, office space, and recreational areas and was opened in March 2015 with the First Lady of Chad in attendance.

== Sudan ==
An early project for the company in Sudan was the construction of an agricultural technology demonstration center in Faw, Qedarif that funded by Chinese foreign aid. Construction was completed in April 2011. CSI worked on further agricultural projects in Sudan, announcing two major investments. The first project was the acquisition of the right to utilize 67 square km for the Rahad Irrigation Scheme in May 2012 and there are plans for the cultivation of a total of 667 square km for cotton production in several Sudanese states.

== Serbia ==
In Europe, the company is active in Serbia where it is the contractor in a $333.74 million contract for the construction of road segments that form part of the Belgrade – Pozega Highway. The project started in 2014 and is expected to be completed in 2017.

China Shandong International Economic & Technical Cooperation Group are interested in developing Ponikve Airport and its commercialization, as well as cooperation on the project of building an exclusive hotel accommodation in Tara.
