= Directorate General Defence Purchase (Pakistan) =

Directorate General Defence Purchase (DGDP)
Agency overview
- Formed: 1970
- Preceding agency: Defence Purchase Directorate
- Headquarters: Rawalpindi, Pakistan
- Agency executive: Rear Admiral Javaid Iqbal, Commander Coast
- Parent agency: Ministry of Defence Production
- Website: dgdp.gov.pk

The Directorate General of Defense Purchase (DGDP) is a department under the Ministry of Defense Production responsible for procurement and disposal of defense stores established in 1970 when it was separated from the Directorate General of Munitions Production. Its headquarters are located in Rawalpindi, Pakistan.

== History ==
DGDP was initially established in 1953 as the Defense Purchase Directorate. In 1967 it was merged with the Directorate General Munitions Production and then separated in 1970 and was given the dual responsibility of procurement of defense stores/equipment in the country and their local production.

After the independence of Bangladesh from Pakistan in 1971, it was split into the Directorate General of Defence Purchase.

=== Recent developments ===
In November 2017, DGDP renewed a Memorandum of Understanding (MoU) with Pakistan National Shipping Corporation (PNSC). They have been in working relationship for more than two decades.

In June 2019, the federal government sanctioned an additional fund of Rs 410 million for the upkeep and repair of two VVIP Gulfstream planes.
