= Mohakhali =

Major neighbourhood of Dhaka, Bangladesh

Mohakhali মহাখালী
- Neighbourhood
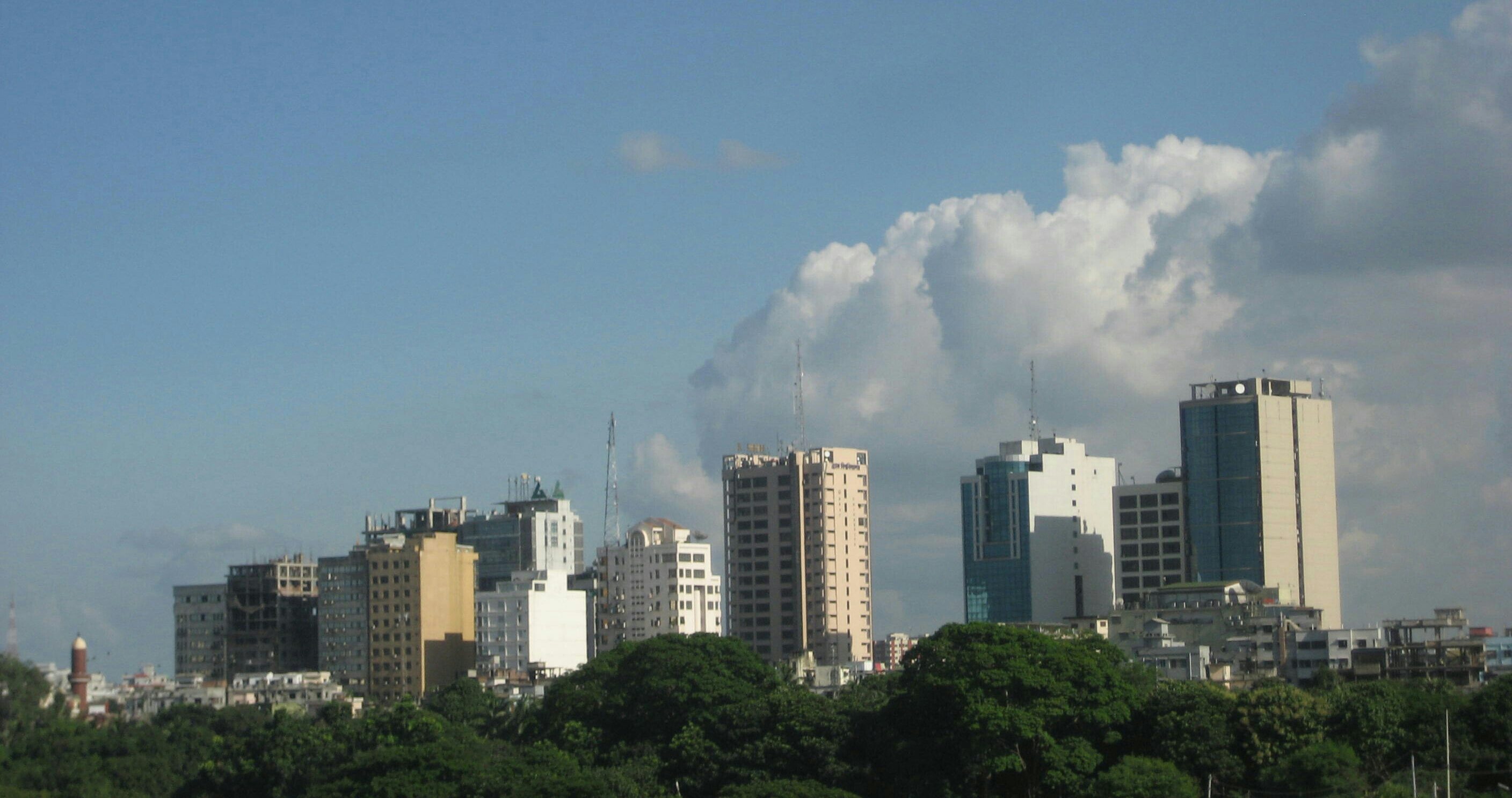
- Skyline of Mohakhali
- Interactive map of Mohakhali
- Coordinates: 23.777264°N 90.403492°E
- Country: Bangladesh
- Division: Dhaka
- District: Dhaka
- Time zone: UTC+06:00 (BST)

Mohakhali (Bengali: মহাখালী) is a neighborhood of Dhaka city, the capital of Bangladesh. Mohakhali is one of the busiest places in Dhaka city. Mohakhali is bounded by Banani in the north, Tejgoan area in the south, Gulshan and Niketan is in the east and Mohakhali DOHS in the west. Many important offices and institutions are based in Mohakhali. Mohakhali Inter District Bus Terminal is one of the most important terminals of Dhaka city. DGHS, NICRH, NIDCH, BCPS, Institute of Health Technology, Dhaka, BRAC Centre, Titumir College, ICDDR,B and SKS Tower are situated in Mohakhali. T & T satellite offices are situated on the west side of the Korail slum. Mohakhali Flyover, the first flyover to open to traffic in the country, in November 2004, is located in Mohakhali. Mohakhali General Market is situated beside the flyover bridge close to the Dhaka–Mymensingh highway.

== Events ==
Korail Slum is located in Mohakhali. In December 2016, a fire destroyed over 500 shanty homes in the slum. That year, the Saat Tola slum which is also located in the Mohakhali caught fire. On 26 October 2023, a massive fire at Khawaja Tower occurred and 3 people died due to the incident.
