= Bangladesh Atomic Energy Commission =

Bangladeshi governmental agency

- Logo of Bangladesh Atomic Energy Commission
- Formation: 27 February 1973; 53 years ago
- Type: Autonomous-Government Organization
- Location: Agargaon, Dhaka-1207, Bangladesh
- Chairman: M. Moinul Islam
- Parent organization: Ministry of Science and Technology
- Staff: 800
- Website: baec.gov.bd

The Bangladesh Atomic Energy Commission is a scientific research organization under the Ministry of Science and Technology of the government of Bangladesh. Its main objective is to promote the use of atomic energy for peaceful purposes. It was established on 27 February 1973, two years after the independence of Bangladesh.

== History ==
The Bangladesh Atomic Energy Commission was established in 1973 after a presidential order by then President Sheikh Mujibur Rahman. In 1975, following the efforts of M. A. Wazed Miah, the Atomic Energy Research Establishment was built in Savar.

The Bangladesh Atomic Energy Commission started its activities at a building of the Jute Research Institute. Afterwards, it was transferred to Dhaka University at 4 Kazi Nazrul Islam Avenue. Before 1988, it was spelled 'Bangladesh "Anobik Shakti Kamishon" (Bangladesh Molecular Energy Commission) in Bengali, from then on, it was renamed "Bangladesh Paramanu Shakti Kamishon"(Bangladesh Atomic Energy Commission). In 2006, the headquarters of BAEC was shifted to the newly built 'Poromanu Bhaban' building at Agargaon, Shere Bangla Nagar, Dhaka. All the research and development activities of BAEC are conducted under three branches: physical sciences, biological sciences, and engineering.

BAEC signed a memorandum of understanding (MoU) with Rosatom in 2009 to enhance cooperation between the two countries in the peaceful use of nuclear energy. The MoU lays the groundwork for negotiations to set up the 600–1,000 MW Ruppur Nuclear Power Plant in Bangladesh.

In May 2018, the commission signed a memorandum of understanding with Daffodil International University. The commission is tasked with the implementation of the Rooppur Nuclear Power Plant, the country's first nuclear power plant. After completion, the plant will be managed by the newly created Nuclear Power Plant Company Bangladesh Limited.

In 2022, the Parliament of Bangladesh passed the Bangladesh Atomic Energy Commission (Amendment) bill, which changed the titles of senior executives in the commission.

In February 2025, the salaries of employees of the commission were postponed following a disagreement with the Ministry of Science and Technology over payment processes. The employees protested against interference by ministry officials in the Ruppur Nuclear Power Plant.

== Research organisations ==
- Atomic Energy Centre, Dhaka
- Atomic Energy Research Establishment (AERE), Savar
  - Institute of Nuclear Science and Technology (INST)
  - Institute of Food and Radiation Biology (IFRB)
  - Institute of Electronics (IE)
  - Institute of Computer Science (ICS)
  - Center for Research Reactor (CRR)
  - Tissue Banking and Biomaterial Research Unit (TBBRU)
  - Nuclear Minerals Unit (NMU)
  - Central Engineering Facilities (CEF)
  - Energy Institute (EI)
  - Institute of Radiation and Polymer Technology (IRPT)
  - Training Institute (TI)
  - Scientific Information Unit (SIU)
- Nuclear Safety and Radiation Control Division (NS&RCD)
- Atomic Energy Center (AECD), Chittagong
- Beach Sand Minerals Exploitation Centre (BSMEC), Cox's Bazar
- Nuclear Power and Energy Division (NPED)

=== Institute of Nuclear Medicine and Allied Science ===
- NINMAS, Bangladesh Medical University Campus, Shahbag, Dhaka
- INMAS, Dhaka Medical College Campus
- INMAS, Sir Salimullah Medical College Campus, Mitford, Dhaka
- INMAS, Chittagong Medical College Campus
- INMAS, Mymensingh Medical College Campus
- INMAS, Sylhet MAG Osmani Medical College Campus
- INMAS, Rajshahi Medical College Campus
- INMAS, Dinajpur Medical College Campus
- INMAS, Rangpur Medical College Campus
- INMAS, Khulna Medical College Campus
- INMAS, Sher-e-Bangla Medical College Campus
- INMAS, Faridpur Medical College Campus
- INMAS, Shaheed Ziaur Rahman Medical College Campus
- INMAS, Comilla Medical College Campus
- INMAS, Kalatoli, Cox's Bazar
- INMAS, Shaheed Suhrawardy Medical College Campus, Dhaka
- INMAS, National Institute of Diseases of the Chest and Hospital, Mohakhali, Dhaka
- INMAS, Jashore Medical College Campus
- INMAS, Gopalganj Medical College Campus
- INMAS, Satkhira Medical College Campus
- INMAS, Pabna Medical College Campus
- INMAS, Kushtia Medical College Campus

== Gallery ==
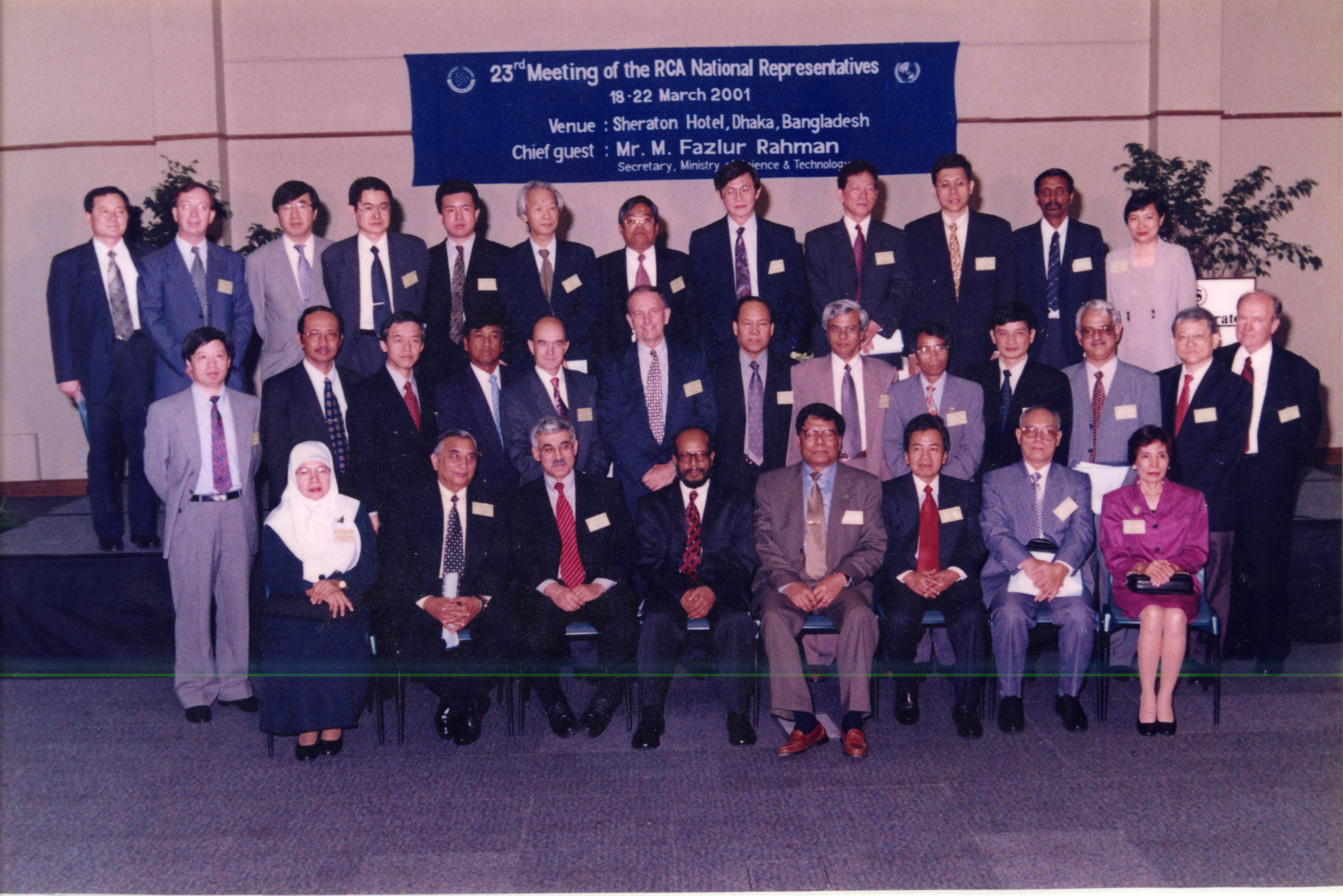
23rd Meeting of the RCA National Representatives held in Dhaka Sheraton Hotel in 1998

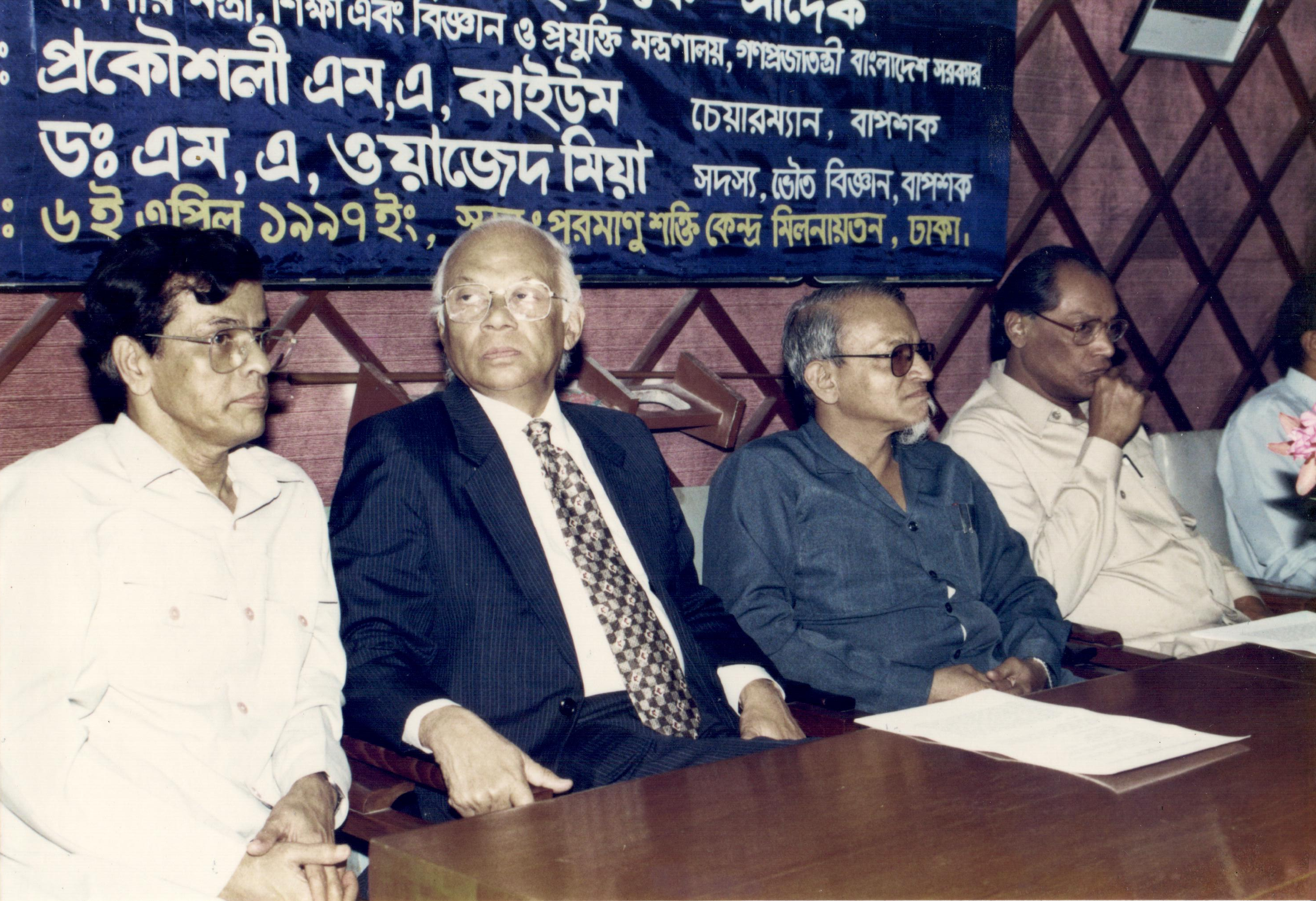
Bangladesh Atomic Energy Scientists Association (BAESA) meeting, attended by Dr. MA Wazed Miah and Dr. Naiyyum Choudhury
