= Minister of Science and Technology (Bangladesh) =

Head of the Ministry of Science and Technology of the Government of Bangladesh

People's Republic of Bangladesh Minister of Science and Technology Of Bangladesh
- বাংলাদেশের বিজ্ঞান ও প্রযুক্তি মন্ত্রী
- Government Seal of Bangladesh

- Flag of Bangladesh

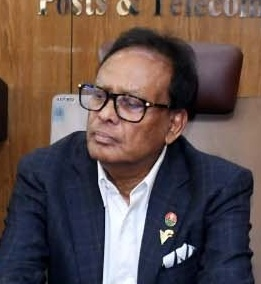
- Incumbent; Fakir Mahbub Anam Swapan since 17 February 2026
- Ministry of Science and Technology
- Style: The Honourable (formal); His Excellency (diplomatic)
- Type: Cabinet minister
- Status: Minister
- Member of: Cabinet
- Reports to: Prime Minister
- Seat: Bangladesh Secretariat
- Nominator: Prime Minister of Bangladesh
- Appointer: President of Bangladesh; on the advice of the Prime Minister
- Term length: Prime Minister 's pleasure
- Formation: 2002; 24 years ago
- Salary: ৳245000 (US$2,000) per month (incl. allowances)
- Website: www.most.gov.bd

The minister of science and technology of Bangladesh is the minister in charge of the Ministry of Science and Technology of the government of the People's Republic of Bangladesh. He is also the minister of all departments and agencies under the Ministry of Science and Technology.

== History ==
National Museum of Science and Technology was the best organization under the ministry for the 2019-2020 year.

== See also ==
- Government of Bangladesh
- Science and technology in Bangladesh
