= Bangladesh Botanical Society =

Research institute in Bangladesh

- Formation: 1972
- Headquarters: Dhaka, Bangladesh
- Region served: Bangladesh
- Official language: Bengali
- Website: www.bdbotsociety.org

Bangladesh Botanical Society is a non-profit organisation that supports botanical research in Bangladesh. It provides scholarships to botany students in Bangladesh. It is located in the Department of Botany, University of Dhaka, Bangladesh.

== History ==
Bangladesh Botanical Society was established in 1972. It started publishing the Bangladesh Journal of Botany in 1972 biannually. The society is funded by the Ministry of Science and Technology. The first president of the society was A. M. Eunus of the University of Rajshahi. The first secretary general of the society was M. A. Hannan of the Atomic Energy Centre, Dhaka. The first editor of Bangladesh Journal of Botany was Ahmad Shamsul Islam of the University of Dhaka. In 1986, the society started the publication Udvid Barta which was a Bengali language botany journal. In February 2017, Bangladesh Botanical Society and the Biology Faculty of Chittagong University held the first Botanical Olympiad in Bangladesh at the Chittagong University. Another Botanical Olympiad was held at Chittagong University in October 2017.

== Leadership and fellows ==
The Bangladesh Botanical Society is governed by an executive committee elected biannually, consisting of a President, Secretary General, and other office bearers.

=== Executive leadership ===
Selected Executive Committees of the Bangladesh Botanical Society
Term	President	Secretary General	Notes
1972–1973	A. M. Eunus	M. A. Hannan	Founding executive committee
1974–1975	Quazi Akhtar Ahmed	A. K. M. Nurul Islam	—
1976–1977	Syed Bazley Ali	Quazi Abdul Fattah	—
1978–1980	Ashraful Haque	M. Akhtaruzzaman	Haque served as President until 1982
1997–1999	M. Akhtaruzzaman	—	Former Chairman, Department of Botany, University of Dhaka
2015–2017	Syed Hadiuzzaman	Sk. Shamimul Alam	—
2018–2020	M. A. Gafur	Mihir Lal Saha	University of Chittagong / University of Dhaka
2021–2023	Md. Abul Bashar	Ashfaque Ahmed	University of Dhaka
2024–2026	Md. Azizur Rahman	Mohammad Zashim Uddin	University of Chittagong / University of Dhaka

=== Honorary Fellows ===
The society confers Honorary Fellowships upon distinguished national and international botanists and agricultural scientists.

International Fellows

- Norman Borlaug (1979) – Nobel Peace Prize laureate and leader of the Green Revolution.
- Arun Kumar Sharma (1979) – Indian cytogeneticist and former President of the Indian National Science Academy.
- M. S. Swaminathan (1986) – FRS, Indian agricultural scientist and former Director General of the International Rice Research Institute.

National Fellows

- Ahmad Shamsul Islam (1997) – First Chief Editor of the Bangladesh Journal of Botany.
- A. K. M. Nurul Islam (1997) – Phycologist and former Secretary General.
- Md. Salar Khan (2002) – Angiosperm taxonomist and founder of the Bangladesh National Herbarium.
- Quazi Abdul Fattah (2005) – Plant physiologist and former Secretary General.
- M. Akhtaruzzaman (2008) – Cytogeneticist, textbook author, and former President.
- M. R. Khan (2008) – Plant pathologist and microbiologist.
- A. M. Eunus (2011) – First President of the Society.
