= Aere =

Aere or AERE may refer to:

- Association of Environmental and Resource Economists, in the United States
- Atomic Energy Research Establishment, in the United Kingdom
- Atomic Energy Research Establishment (Bangladesh)
- Tropical Storm Aere, various tropical storms
