= Biotechnology and genetic engineering in Bangladesh =

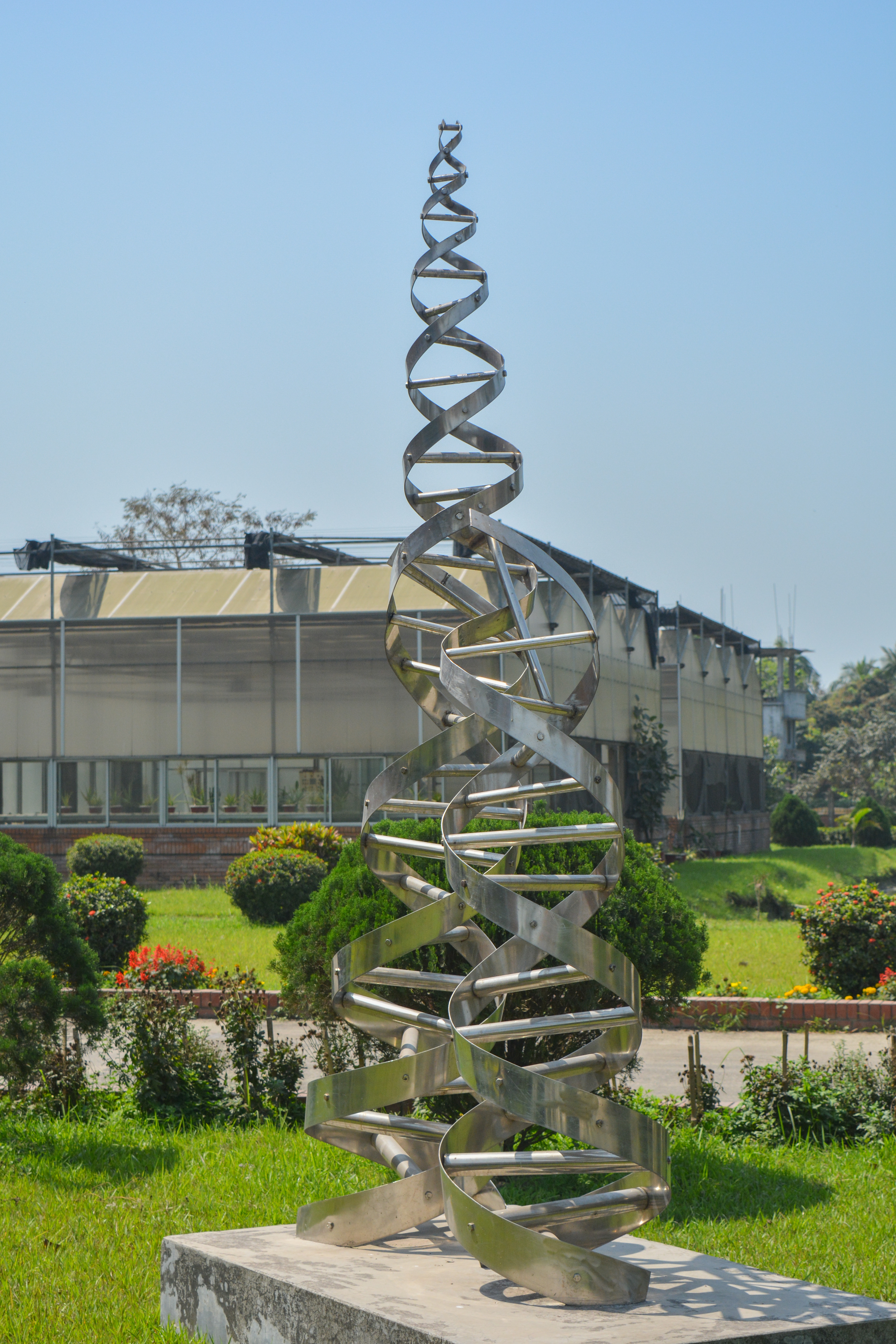
DNA Helix (Sculpture) at National Institute of Biotechnology

Biotechnology and genetic engineering in Bangladesh is one of the thriving fields of science and technology in the country.

== History ==
The research for biotechnology in Bangladesh started in the late 1970s. The root cause behind the initiation was the significance of agricultural sector, which had been the backbone of the national economy since the ancient times. The research first started in the department of Genetics and Plant Breeding in Bangladesh Agricultural University through Tissue culture on jute. Subsequently, within the next 10–12 years, similar research programs began to take place in the Faculty of Biotechnology & Genetic Engineering at:

- Mawlana Bhashani Science and Technology University
- University of Rajshahi
- University of Chittagong
- Khulna University
- Islamic University, Kushtia
- Jagannath University
- Jahangirnagar University
- Shahjalal University of Science and Technology
- Bangladesh Rice Research Institute
- Bangladesh Jute Research Institute
- Gopalganj Science and Technology University
- Sylhet Agricultural University
- Gazipur Agricultural University
- Bangladesh Agricultural Research Institute
- Bangladesh Agricultural University
- Bangladesh Forest Research Institute
- Bangladesh Institute of Nuclear Agriculture
- Bangladesh Council of Scientific and Industrial Research
- Bangladesh Livestock Research Institute
- Bangladesh Atomic Energy Commission
- National Institute of Biotechnology

In 1990, Bangladesh Association for Plant Tissue Culture (BAPTC) was formed which has been organising several international conferences since its inception. In September 1993, the government of Bangladesh formed a National Committee on Biotechnology Product Development to select potential biotechnological projects which could be leased out for commercialisation. In collaboration with BAPTC, the Ministry of Science and Technology organised a workshop on Biosafety Regulation in 1997, after which a task force was formed to formulate biosafety guidelines and biosafety regulations in the light of the regulation of the workshop. In the late 1990s, Bangladesh became a member of the International Centre for Genetic Engineering and Biotechnology (ICGEB). In 1999, the National Institute of Biotechnology was established as the centre of excellence in biotechnological education. To accelerate multidimensional biotechnological research, in 2006, the government adopted the national policy guidelines on biotechnology which was approved by the National Task force on biotechnology. In 2012, the cabinet approved the draft of National Biotechnology Policy, 2012 which was aimed at eradicating poverty through increasing productivity in agriculture and industrial sectors.

== Genome sequencing projects ==
=== Jute ===
In 2008, with the funding of the government, the University of Dhaka, DataSoft IT firm and Bangladesh Jute Research Institute initiated a collaborative genome research program on jute under the leadership of Dr. Maqsudul Alam who had previously sequenced the genomes of papaya and rubber. Subsequently, in 2010, the group of scientists successfully sequenced the genome of jute, through which, Bangladesh became only the second country after Malaysia, among the developing nations, to have successfully sequenced a plant genome.

=== Fungus ===
In 2012, the same group of scientists decoded the genome of Macrophomina phaseolina, a Botryosphaeriaceae fungus, which is responsible for causing seedling blight, root rot, and charcoal rot of more than 500 crop and non-crop species throughout the world. The sequencing took place at the laboratory of Bangladesh Jute Research Institute and was done as part of The Basic and applied Research on Jute project.

=== Rice ===
In 2021, scientists at the Bangladesh Institute of Nuclear Agriculture (BINA) and Bangladesh Agricultural University (BAU) unveiled the full genome sequence of salinity and submergence-tolerant rice for the first time.

== Biotechnology industry ==
The biotechnology industry is yet to be a major contributor on the national economy, however, according to the experts, the results of some ongoing research shows enough lacks of this sector. BCSIR has undertaken the production of Spirulina and a certain quantity of it is being marketed as tablets by several private manufacturers. BCSIR has also explored the production of baker's yeast using molasses which are by-products of the sugarcane manufacturing plants in the northern part of the country. The net production of molasses numbers about 100,000 million tons per year, about half of which is used in the distilleries for the production of ethanol. The production of Rhizobium is also perceived to have commercial potential. Several private pharmaceutical companies have started to develop separate and dedicated biotech units. Some private firms like BRAC Biotechnology Center, Square Agric-tech and Aman Agro Industries are producing virus-free potato seeds in substantial quantities, gradually reducing the dependency on imported potato seeds. Proshika Tissue Culture Center is now exporting varieties of tissue culture derived orchid plants. Pharmaceutical companies like the Incepta Pharmaceuticals have begun to produce and market insulin and preparing to export abroad. Incepta has also signed an agreement with ICGEB to receive the technological know-how for commercially manufacturing hepatitis B vaccine.
