= Naiyyum Choudhury =

Bangladeshi biotechnologist and nuclear scientist (1944–2019)

- নঈম চৌধুরী
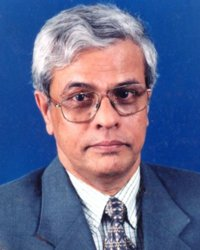
- Naiyyum Choudhury
- Born: 27 September 1944; Comilla, Bengal Presidency, British India
- Died: 7 September 2019 (aged 74); Dhaka, Bangladesh
- Resting place: Banani, Dhaka
- Education: Chowmuhani College (HSC); Dhaka University (BSc Hons); Dhaka University (MSc); University of New South Wales (PhD)
- Known for: National Biotechnology Policy of Bangladesh
- Spouse: Shamima K Choudhury (m. 1978–2019)
- Children: 2 (Sarah, Sajid)
- Awards: Journalists Association Award, 2000; Zaki Memorial Gold Medal, 2002; BAS Gold Medal, 2002
- Scientific career
- Workplaces: BAERA; BAEC; Dept of Microbiology, DU; Dept of Genetic Engineering, DU; Dept of Chemical Engineering, BUET; BRAC University; Institute for Developing Health Science; National Oceanographic And Maritime Institute; Bangladesh Academy of Sciences
- Thesis: Enzymic saccharification of sugar cane bagasse. (1982)
- Doctoral advisor: Noel Dunn, Peter Grey

Founding Chairman, BAERA
- In office November 2014 – 7 September 2019

Chairman, BAEC
- In office 1 August 2002 – 23 September 2003
- Website: https://naiyyumchoudhury.com

Naiyyum Choudhury (27 September 1944 – 7 September 2019) was a Bangladeshi biotechnologist and a nuclear scientist. He pioneered the development and adoption of the National Biotechnology policy of Bangladesh. He served as the Chairman of Bangladesh Atomic Energy Commission, and also served in many important positions in Bangladesh. He was serving as the founding Chairman of Bangladesh Atomic Energy Regulatory Authority (BAERA) at the time of his death. He was the Chairman of the Department of Microbiology, Dhaka University, Professor and Coordinator of Biotechnology at BRAC University, and served as faculty member in Jahangir Nagar University and BUET. He was also the IAEA Regional Cooperation Agreement (RCA) Chair person. He was also a fellow of Bangladesh Academy of Sciences (BAS), and was serving as the Vice President of BAS at the time of his death. He was also the contact person for Inter Academic Panel (IAP) of Bangladesh.

Choudhury also organised a number of international seminars and symposiums.

== Academic qualifications ==
Choudhury held a PhD in biotechnology (1982) from University of New South Wales. He had his MSc in biochemistry (Thesis group) from Dhaka University in 1967, and had 1st Class (3rd in order of merit). He received the European Economic Community Fellowship, 1988–1989, for post-doctoral research at the University of Karlsruhe, West Germany.

== Liberation War of Bangladesh ==
Choudhury obtained the Commonwealth scholarship to attend the McGill University for his PhD degree. But as the liberation war broke out in Bangladesh in 1971, Choudhury actively protested the massacre by the Pakistani Army of the Bangladeshi people. He was the founder secretary of Bangladesh Association of Quebec, Canada, formed on 7 March 1971. On his active protest, a shipping of Sabre Jet spare parts for Chittagong, East Pakistan, was cancelled. Choudhury could not finish his PhD and returned home to Bangladesh.

== Teaching career ==
- PhD, M.Phil. & M.Sc. supervisor of more than 25 students in Dhaka University and Jahangirnagar University.
- Professor and chairman, Department of Microbiology, Dhaka University, November 1993– July 1994; teaching, research and administration.
- Part-time teacher, Life Science Institute, Jahangirnagar University; teaching Advanced Microbiology at the post-graduate level, 1990–1998.
- Part-time teacher, Department of Chemical Engineering, B.U.E.T. teaching the course: Principles of Food Preservation and Processing in the 3rd year B.Sc. Chem. Engineering, 1986–91.
- Part-time teacher, Department of Microbiology, Dhaka University, January 1983 – June 1993, teaching Food Microbiology and Microbial Biotechnology at the B.Sc.(Hons) and M.Sc. level.
- Course Coordinator, Basic Nuclear Orientation Course (six months) 1984; Organized by the Bangladesh Atomic Energy Commission for orientation of the fresh recruits in the commission.
- Course Coordinator, Radiation Biology course, 1983. Institute of Food and Radiation Biology,. AERE, Savar, Dhaka.
- Tutor (Part-time), 1st year Biology Teaching Unit and School of Biotechnology, University of N.S.W., Australia, July 1978 to June 1982.
- Lecturer, Chemistry, Chaumuhani College, teaching organic chemistry and physical chemistry at the undergraduate and graduate level Noakhali, February 1968 – September 1968.
- Guest professor, Department of Genetic Engineering and Biotechnology, D.U., April 2004 – to date
- Guest professor, Department of Microbiology, D.U., 2003– to date, teaching Bioprocess Technology at M.S. level.
- Professor, Department of Mathematics & Natural Science, BRAC University.

== Positions held ==
- Chairman, Bangladesh Atomic Energy Regulatory Authority, 2014-2019
- Chairman, Bangladesh Atomic Energy Commission, August 2002 – September 2003
- Project Director, National Institute of Biotechnology, Ministry of Science and Information & Communication Technology; 1999–2003
- Member, Bio Science, Bangladesh Atomic Energy Commission, March 1999 – August 2002
- Project Director; Research, Development and Academic programme of BAEC; 1999–2002
- Director, International Affairs, Bangladesh Atomic Energy Commission, March 1998 – July 1999
- Director, Planning & Development, Bangladesh Atomic Energy Commission, July 1994 – Feb 1998
- Chairman, Department of Microbiology, Dhaka University, November 1993 – July 1994
- Director, Planning & Development, Bangladesh Atomic Energy Commission, July 1993 – October 1993
- Director, I.F.R.B., Bangladesh Atomic Energy Commission, Oct. 1989 – June 1993
- Director, Bio-science, Bangladesh Atomic Energy Commission, March 1988 – September 1988
- Head, Microbiology Division, Institute of Food and Radiation Biology, AERE, Savar, 1982–1988

== International assignments ==
- Resource Person in the Training Workshop on Project Planning, organised by the International Atomic Energy Agency at Argonne National Laboratory, Chicago, Illinois, US, 12–23 April 1999
- Facilitator in the Regional Training Course (RTC) on Planning and Design of TC Projects organised by the International Atomic Energy Agency, Beijing, PRC, 28 June – 7 July 1999
- National TC Liaison Officer for International Atomic Energy Agency TC projects supported every year by IAEA, 1996–1999
- Project Counterpart for IAEA/ non-RCA project on Sustainability and Self-reliance of National Nuclear Research Institutions (RAS/0/032), 1999–2001
- RCA Chairperson, 2000–2001, Chairing RCA National Representative Meetings (17 Member States in the East Asia and the Pacific Region) and the General Conference Meeting held in IAEA Headquarters, Vienna for formulating strategy for Regional Projects, decide on policy issues and harmonising RCA projects in line with the TC strategy of the IAEA
- Chairperson, RCARO Advisory Committee, 2001–2003, RCA Regional Office was opened in Republic of Korea under the aegis of the RCA and IAEA in 2001

== Membership/executive of professional bodies ==
=== International ===
- New York Academy of Sciences, 1993
- American Society for Microbiology, 1989
- British Society for Applied Bacteriology, 1989

=== National ===
- Fellow, Bangladesh Academy of Sciences since 2000
- Elected Secretary, Bangladesh Academy of Sciences, 2004–2008, 2008–2012
- President Bangladesh Atomic Energy Scientists Association, 1995–1996, 1997–1998
- President Bangladesh Association of Scientists and Scientific Professions, 1997–1998, 1999–2001
- President Section-II, Bangladesh Association for the Advancement of Science (BAAS) 1996–1998, 1998–2000
- President Bangladesh Society of Microbiologists, 1997–1999; 1999–2001
- President Bangladesh Biochemical Society, 2000–2002
- President Bangladesh Tissue Banking Society 2000 to 2019
- Life Member of Bangladesh Association for the Advancement of Science, Bangladesh Biochemical Society, Bangladesh Botanical Society, Bangladesh Association of Scientists and Scientific Professions, Nutrition Society of Bangladesh, Asiatic Society of Bangladesh.
- Vice President, Bangladesh Academy of Science, Council (July 2016 - June 2019)

== Publications ==
Choudhury has 31 international publications, 96 national publications and edited 5 books and proceedings, and written 18 articles.

== Awards received ==
- Journalists Association Award, 2000
- Zaki Memorial Gold Medal, 2002
- BAS Gold Medal, 2002

== Personal life ==
Naiyyum was born in 1944 in Munsefbari, Comilla. He was married to Professor Shamima K Choudhury till his death. Shamima and Naiyyum have two children, Dr. Sarah Nahin Choudhury, FRCP and Dr. Sajid Muhaimin Choudhury.

== Gallery ==
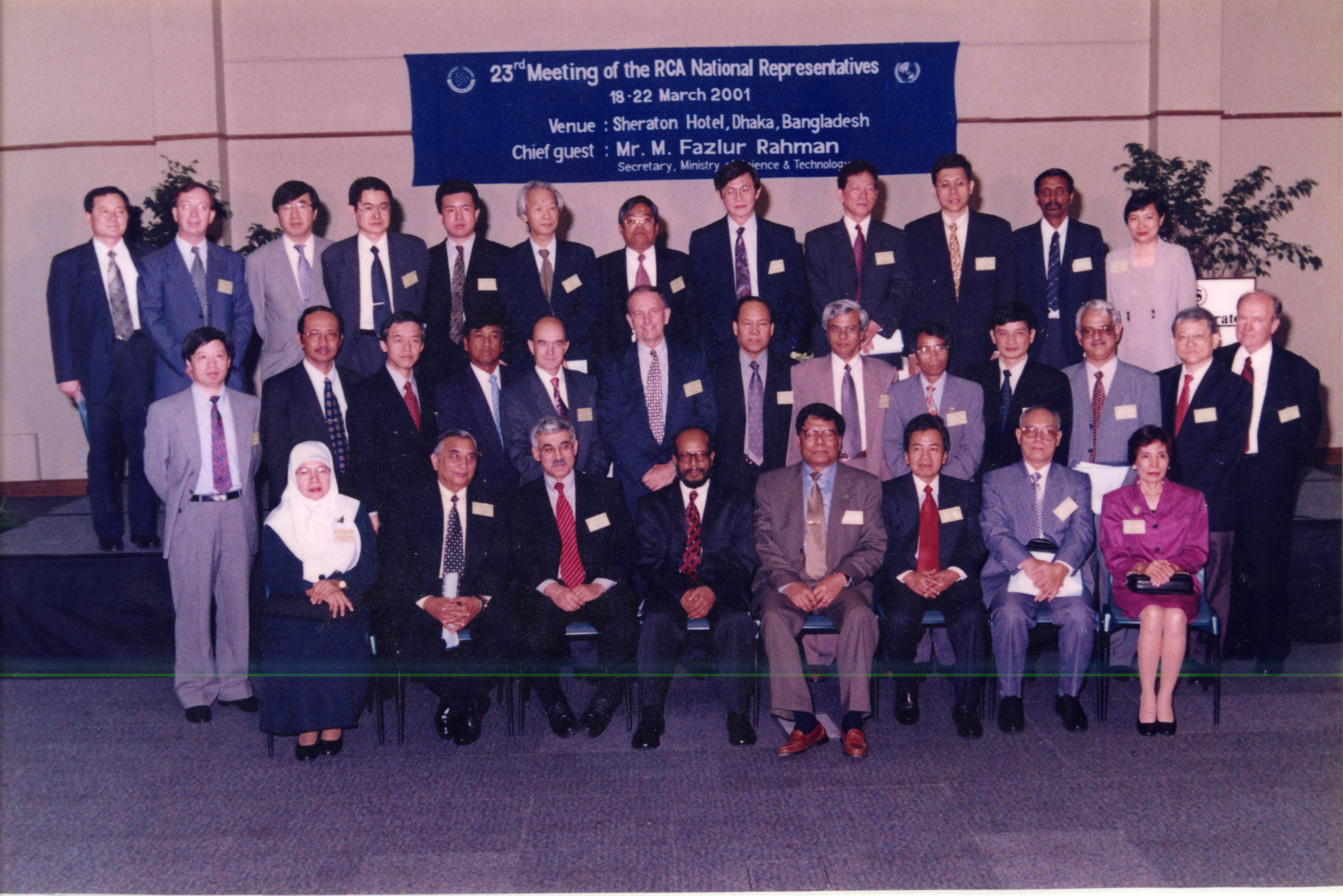
23rd Meeting of the RCA National Representatives held in Dhaka Sheraton Hotel in 1998

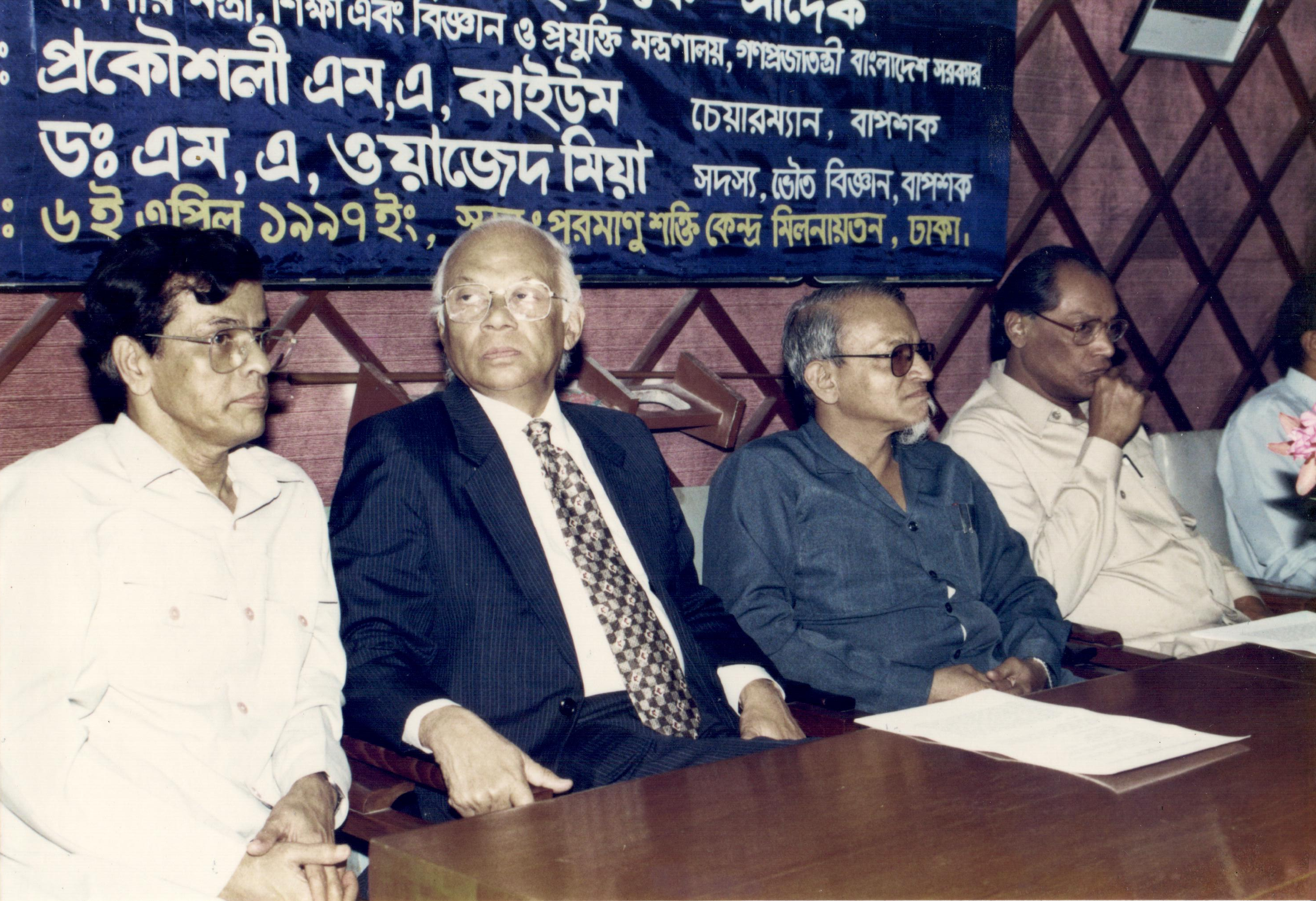
Bangladesh Atomic Energy Scientists Association (BAESA) meeting, attended by Dr. M. A. Wazed Miah

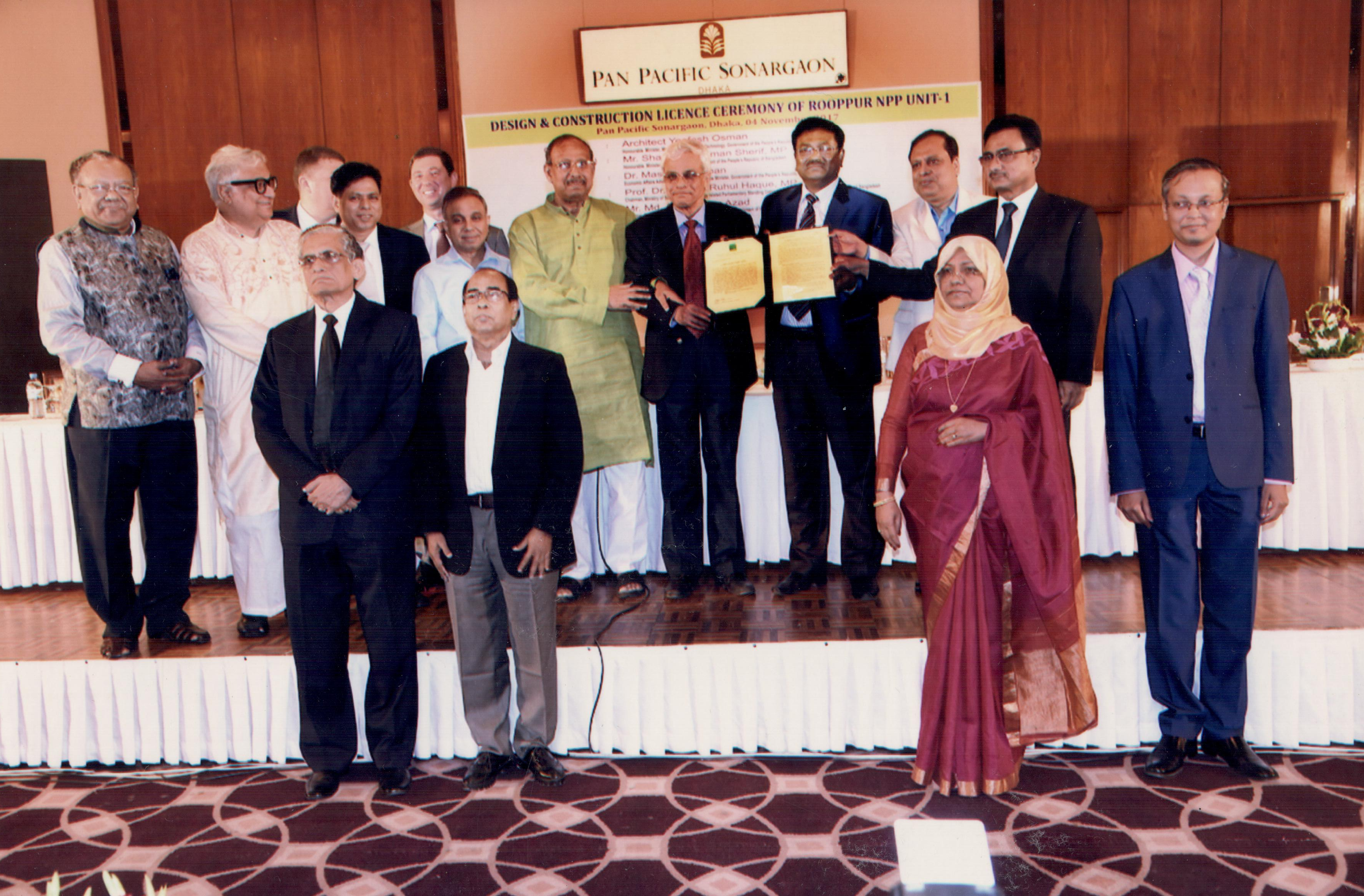
License Awarding Ceremony of the Rooppur Nuclear Power Plant

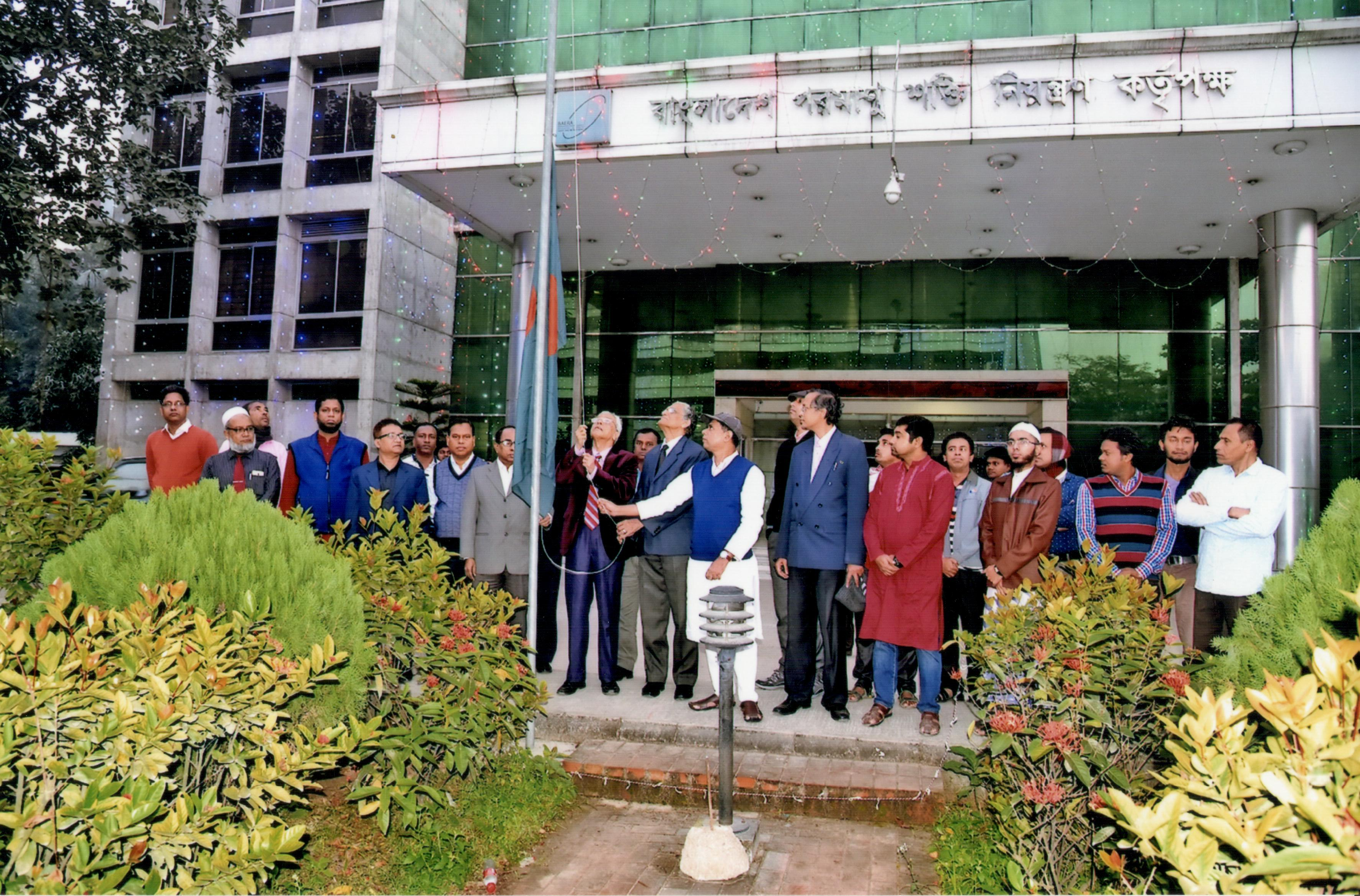
Bangladesh Atomic Energy Regulatory Authority in Victory Day 2017
