= M. Akhtaruzzaman =

Bangladeshi botanist and academic (1933–2010)

- ম. আখতারুজ্জামান
- Born: 1 March 1933
- Died: 2 December 2010 (aged 77)
- Education: University of Dhaka; University of Notre Dame
- Known for: Research in cytogenetics and Bengali-language textbooks on cytology, genetics and evolution
- Scientific career
- Fields: Botany, cytogenetics
- Workplaces: University of Dhaka

M. Akhtaruzzaman (Bengali: ম. আখতারুজ্জামান; 1933–2010) was a Bangladeshi botanist, cytogeneticist, academic, and professor at the University of Dhaka. He served as the chairman of the Department of Botany, noted for his cytogenetics research in Bangladesh, authoring several foundational Bengali-language textbooks on cytology and evolution. He served as the General Secretary and President of the Bangladesh Botanical Society.

== Early life and career ==
Akhtaruzzaman completed his B.Sc. (1953) and M.Sc. (1960) from the University of Dhaka, followed by a Ph.D. in biology from the University of Notre Dame in 1967. His doctoral dissertation was titled Cytogenetics of Gamma-Ray-Induced Reciprocal Translocations in Collinsia heterophylla. Akhtaruzzaman was a professor and head of the Department of Botany, University of Dhaka. Following his doctoral studies, his research in cytogenetics focused on gene organization, karyotype analysis, and fluorescent chromosome banding. His subsequent studies and supervision involved around the genetic structures of native plant species and fungi.

During his tenure at University of Dhaka, he authored several foundational Bengali-language textbooks on botany, cytology, and genetics that became standard curriculum texts in Bangladeshi universities and public schools. He also translated global scientific works. He formulated the courses titled Cytology, Cytogenetics and Evolution at the department. He furthermore served as an Honorary Professor at the department after his formal retirement. He supervised the first Ph.D. fellow of the department.

He was the president of the Bangladesh College-University Teachers’ Association (BCUTA), of which he was an official delegate representing Bangladesh at the UNESCO World Conference on Higher Education 1998 in Paris. He also served as the Secretary General (1978–1980), and President (1997–1999) of the Bangladesh Botanical Society.

Akhtaruzzaman advocated for teaching evolution as a science in the national curriculum and defended the scientific method against creationist arguments in educational policies.

Akhtaruzzaman was a lifetime member of the Bangladesh Botanical Society (BBS). In 2008, the BBS awarded him an Honorary Fellowship in recognition of his lifetime contributions to the field of botany in Bangladesh. In his memory, the Department of Botany at the University of Dhaka established the Professor Dr. M. Akhtaruzzaman Gold Medal, an academic award presented to students who achieve the highest marks in the department's Master of Science (M.S.) examination.

== Selected publications ==
=== Textbooks ===
- Akhtaruzzaman, M. (1974). Koshbidhya (কোষবিদ্যা) [Cytology] (in Bengali). Dhaka: Bangla Academy. (Later editions published by Hassan Book House.)
- Akhtaruzzaman, M. (1998). Kosh-bangshagatibidhya (কোষ-বংশগতিবিদ্যা) [Cytogenetics] (in Bengali). Dhaka: Bangla Academy. ISBN 984-07-3732-5.
- Akhtaruzzaman, M. (1998). Bibortonbidya (বিবর্তনবিদ্যা) [Evolutionary Biology] (in Bengali). Dhaka: Bangla Academy. ISBN 984-07-3829-1.
- Akhtaruzzaman, M. (1991). Bangshagati Bidya (বংশগতি বিদ্যা) [Genetics] (in Bengali). Dhaka: Bangla Academy. ISBN 984-07-3732-5.

=== Translations ===
- Darwin, Charles. Jibjatir Utpotti (জীবজাতির উৎপত্তি). Translated by M. Akhtaruzzaman. (Bengali translation of On the Origin of Species).
- Jones, Steve. Gener Bhasha (জিনের ভাষা). Translated by M. Akhtaruzzaman. (Bengali translation of The Language of the Genes).

=== Selected scientific literature ===
- Zaman, M. A.; Rai, K. S. (1972). "Cytogenetics of Thirteen Radiation-Induced Reciprocal Translocations in Collinsia heterophylla". Cytologia. 37 (4): 629–638. doi:10.1508/cytologia.37.629.
- Zaman, M. A.; Patwary, M. U.; Matin, A. (1977). "Karyomorphology and Meiotic Behaviour of Galphimia gracilis Bartl. (Malpighiaceae)". Caryologia. 30 (4): 429–434. doi:10.1080/00087114.1977.10796717.
- Akhtaruzzaman, M. (1980). "Studies on the organization of genes controlling lysine biosynthesis in Neurospora crassa: VI. Interallelic complementation at locus lysine-5". Pakistan Journal of Botany. 12 (1): 55–67. ISSN 0556-3321.
- Ahmed, Lubna; Begum, Rabeya; Noor, Sharif S.; Zaman, M. A.; Alam, Sheikh S. (2004). "Reversible Fluorescent Chromosome Banding in Three Crinum spp. (Amaryllidaceae)". Cytologia. 69 (1): 69–74. doi:10.1508/cytologia.69.69.
