= Mokabbir Hossain =

Md Mokabbir Hossain is the senior secretary of the Ministry of Water Resources. Prior to that, he served at the Ministry of Science and Technology and former secretary of the Public Security Division of the Bangladesh Ministry of Home Affairs. Earlier, he was chairman of Bangladesh Energy and Power Research Council. He also served as managing director and chief executive officer of Biman Bangladesh Airlines.

== Career ==
Hossain led an investigation team of the Ministry of Civil Aviation and Tourism to examine an attempted plane hijacking in Chittagong Airport on 24 February 2019.

In September 2019, Hossain was appointed managing director and chief executive officer of Biman Bangladesh Airlines, the national airlines of Bangladesh by chairman of the board Muhammad Enamul Bari. He replaced AM Mosaddique Ahmed who was removed following allegations of corruption. He promised to bring transparency to the operations of Bangladesh Biman. In December 2020, Hossain was appointed Secretary of the Ministry of Railways replacing Salim Reza. In September 2021, Abu Saleh Mostafa Kamal replaced him as managing director and chief executive officer of Biman Bangladesh Airlines.

In July 2023, Hossain was appointed chairman of Bangladesh Energy and Power Research Council. He was promoted to senior secretary in November 2023.

On 15 August 2024, Hossain was made secretary of the Public Security Division of the Ministry of Home Affairs after the fall of the Sheikh Hasina led Awami League government. Hossain was transferred to Ministry of Science and Technology on 18 August. He was replaced by Mohammad Abdul Momen.
