= Shamima K. Choudhury =

Bangladeshi academic and women-in-science advocate

Shamima K Choudhury
- শামীমা করিম চৌধুরী
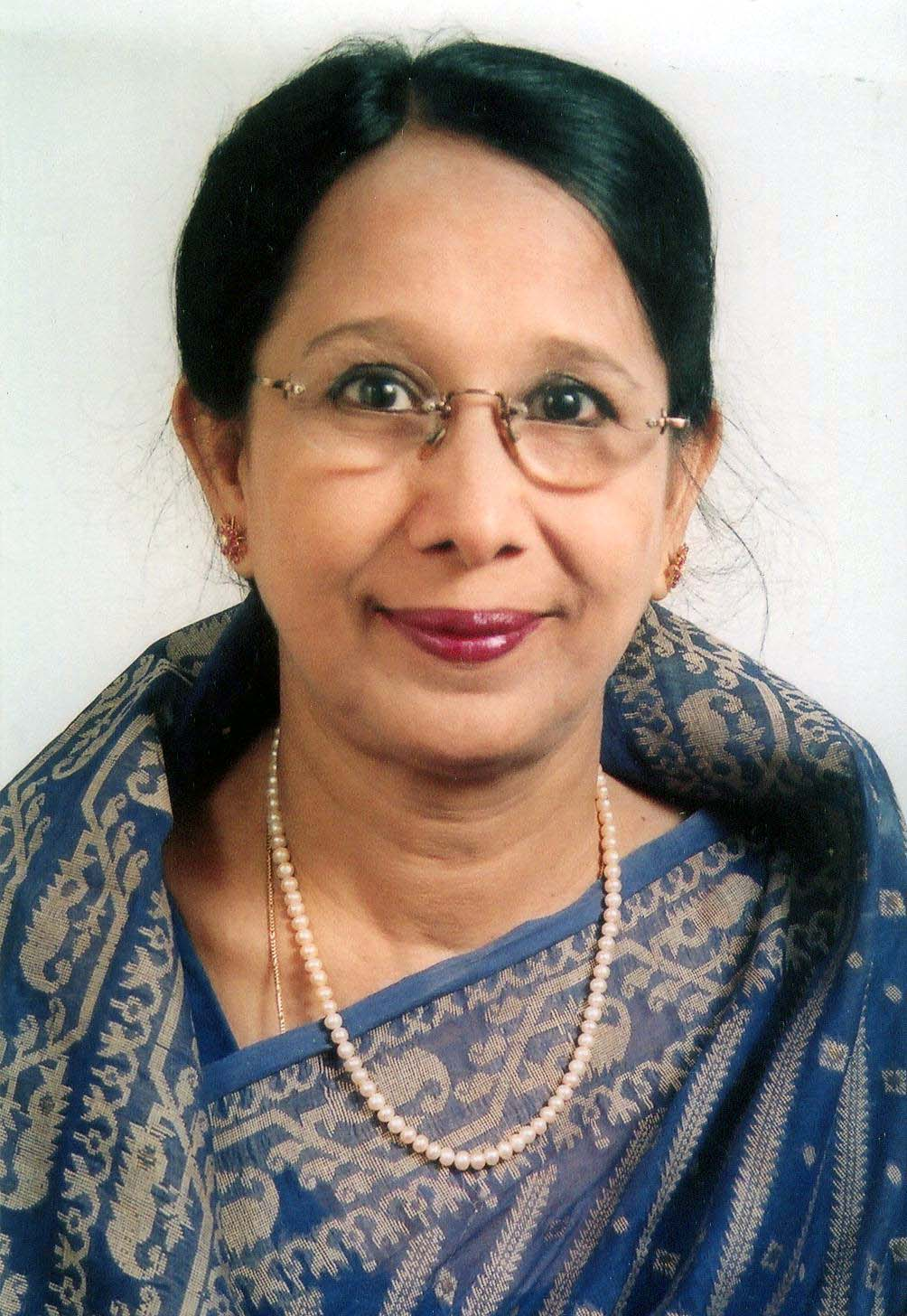

Director of the Bose Center, Dhaka University
- In office March 2010 – June 2017

Provost, Rokeya Hall, Dhaka University
- In office October 1999 – February 2002

Personal details
- Born: Shamima Karim; 12 February 1951 Comilla, Bangladesh
- Spouse: Naiyyum Choudhury
- Children: 2
- Education: Dhaka University; University of New South Wales
- Occupation: Teaching, research, university administration
- Website: Official website

Shamima Karim Choudhury (born February 12, 1951) is a Bangladeshi physicist, academician, researcher, and women-in-science advocate. She retired as a professor from the Department of Physics, University of Dhaka on 30 June 2016 after 44 years of teaching and research. She supervised more than 70 Masters and MPhil students in Physics. She is a Fellow of Bangladesh Physical Society. She is a member of OWSD, IOP and many national science societies. She is the team Leader of WIP in Bangladesh. She worked as the Provost of Rokeya Hall and as director of the Bose Centre for Advanced Study and Research in Natural Sciences (named after Prof. Satyendra Nath Bose) at Dhaka University.

== Education ==
Choudhury studied in the Department of Physics at Dhaka University beginning in 1967 and obtained her B.Sc. (Honors) in 1970 (exam held in 1971). She graduated with an M.Sc. in 1973, in the thesis group (1971 batch). She did her M.S. in physics at the Laboratory of Biophysics and Crystallography, School of Physics in the University of New South Wales, Australia, from 1978 to 1982. She also worked with Prof. Louise Johnson as a visiting scientist at the Laboratory of Molecular Biophysics, University of Oxford, U.K. in 1986 and 1988.

== Career ==
=== Academic ===
Choudhury worked as a research scholar in the Department of Physics, Dhaka University from 1973-1975, before joining as a lecturer in 1975. She worked as a part-time tutor in the School of Physics, University of New South Wales, Australia, 1980-82. She came back to Bangladesh to join the Department of Physics, Dhaka University as an assistant professor in 1983. She became associate professor in 1988 and was promoted to professor in January 1998. She retired from the same department as a selection grade professor in July 2016.

=== University administration ===
Choudhury worked as the provost of Rokeya Hall, Dhaka University, from October 1999 to February 2002. She served as a member of the advisory committee of Semiconductor Technology Research Centre (STRC), University of Dhaka from 1993 to 2016. She also served as the director, Bose Centre for Advanced Study & Research In Natural Sciences, University of Dhaka, from March 2010 to June 2017. As the director of Bose Centre, she organised the 1st and 2nd International Bose Conference at the Nabab Nawab Ali Chowdhury Senate Bhaban of the Dhaka University in 2013 and 2015 respectively. Prof. Partha Ghose spoke as the keynote speaker of the event. She also organized many international workshops, Bose lectures, and birth and death anniversary of S.N.Bose, where many eminent national and international academicians and scientists attended. Prof. M. Zahid Hasan delivered Bose lecture in November 2015, in the Nawab Ali Chowdhury Senate building. She was a member of the Dhaka University Senate from 2013- 2016

=== Research ===
Choudhury worked on various aspects of thin-film properties, solar cells, ferrite and ceramic materials, nano and advanced materials, biophysics, and crystallography throughout her career. She has over 200 peer-reviewed national and international publications and has over 555 citations according to the Google Scholar (as of September 2020) and 456 citations according to ResearchGate.

== Advocacy ==
=== Women in STEM advocacy ===
Choudhury has been participating as an invited speaker in a number of International conferences, IEEE-WIE, Women in Physics and Gender summit advocating the gender equality in science, engineering and technology. In an interview with the Daily Star, she pointed out that percentage of women in physics and science are disproportionately low compared to the enrollment in medicine or other fields. She actively spoke for gender equality of women in ICT, science, and physics.

== Philanthropy ==
Bangladesh Physical Society awards the Shamima Karim Choudhury Trust Fund Scholarship every year since 2015. The Scholarship is awarded to one male and one female student obtaining highest CGPA in their B.Sc. Hons. in Physics exam and one financial disadvantageous student while studying in the Dhaka University Physics Department.

Rokeya Hall Alumni Association also awards one scholarship to a meritorious, financially disadvantageous undergraduate student from the Shamima Karim Choudhury trust fund organized by Rokeya Hall Alumni Association.

== Personal life ==
Shamima Choudhury was born in 1951 in Comilla. Her father, Fazlul Karim was the first Muslim professor and the vice-principal of Comilla Victoria College. Her mother, Zohara Karim was a social worker and the vice-president of the then All Pakistan Women's Association (APWA) in Comilla. She was married to Naiyyum Choudhury on March 7, 1976, until his death. They have two children.
