= Peter Gray (bioengineer) =

Bioengineer in Australia

Professor Peter Gray AO FRSN FTSE
- Born: 1946; Sydney, Australia
- Education: University of Sydney (BA); University of New South Wales (PhD)
- Known for: Industrial Biotechnology; Antibody development using mammalian cell lines; stem cell bioprocesses
- Scientific career
- Fields: Biotechnology
- Workplaces: University of New South Wales (UNSW), Sydney, from 1988 – 2003; Australian Institute for Bioengineering and Nanotechnology (AIBN); The University of Queensland
- Thesis: (1970)
- Doctoral students: Naiyyum Choudhury

Peter Philip Gray AO FRSN FTSE (born in Sydney in 1946) is an Australian bioengineer. He was professor and head of biotechnology at the University of New South Wales, Sydney, from 1988–2003, and was the inaugural director of the Australian Institute for Bioengineering and Nanotechnology (AIBN) at The University of Queensland in Brisbane, Australia from 2003–2015.

== Biography ==
Gray undertook postdoctoral research as a Science Research Fellow at University College London (UCL) in the group of Professors Malcolm Lilly and Peter Dunnill. The group was receiving major funding to investigate the application of immobilised enzymes processes for industrial bioprocessing. While at UCL, Gray carried out research on a number of unit operations required for the large scale production of bioactive proteins production by bacteria, unit operations which subsequently became widely used for the production of proteins made using recombinant DNA (rDNA) technology. He then moved to the United States to work for Eli Lilly and Company, in Indianapolis, Indiana, as a Senior Scientist. At Lilly’s he was responsible for developing production scale antibiotic fermentations. Lilly’s was one of the first companies to link the new knowledge of microbial genetics with bioengineering to improve the strains and bioprocesses used for antibiotic production.

In 1984, he was a founder of the Australian Biotechnology Association, which subsequently became AusBiotech, and was one of its early Presidents.

He serves on the Boards of: BioPharmaceuticals Australia Pty Ltd; Engineering Conferences International (ECI) Inc, New York; ACYTE Biotechnology Pty Ltd, the UQ Diamantina Institute (UQDI), and on a number of state and federal government committees in the fields of biotechnology, pharmaceuticals and education.

Gray was appointed an Officer of the Order of Australia in the 2017 Australia Day Honours and elected a Fellow of the Royal Society of New South Wales in 2024.

== Australian Institute for Bioengineering and Nanotechnology (AIBN) ==
In 2003 Gray was appointed the Inaugural Director of the Australian Institute for Bioengineering and Nanotechnology (AIBN) and Professor of Bioengineering by The University of Queensland, Brisbane, Australia. Under his tenure the institute grew of more than 500 people with an annual turnover of AUD$40 million, which is now known nationally and internationally as an institute with sustained multi-disciplinary research excellence, and strong collaborative links to leading global research groups and corporations. In September 2015 it was announced that Professor Gray would step down from the role of AIBN Director, to be succeeded by Professor Alan Rowan.

== Research ==
Gray has been publishing in antibody development using mammalian cell lines and stem cell bioprocesses.

His work, and primarily that of others, helped to lure attract AUD$17 million in seed funding from the Queensland Government and Australian Government in 2011 to establish a facility in the state run by DSM Biologics. At the announcement attended by former Queensland Premier Anna Bligh, Professor Gray said, "The collaboration with DSMB will ensure that Australian bioresearchers will be able to rapidly progress their therapeutic leads into high purity material ready for evaluation in the clinic."

Gray has also helped to manufacture an antibody against Hendra virus on licence from the Henry Jackson Foundation, Uniformed Services University. The antibody entered phase 1 clinical trials in 2015. The work is the first clinical trial for a Hendra virus treatment. The work has led to further collaborations to develop an antibody for Middle East respiratory syndrome coronavirus
