= Ministry of Science and Technology (Bangladesh) =

Government ministry of Bangladesh

- বিজ্ঞান ও প্রযুক্তি মন্ত্রণালয়
- Government Seal of Bangladesh

Ministry overview
- Formed: 2002; 24 years ago
- Preceding Ministry: Ministry of Science, Information and Communications Technology
- Jurisdiction: Government of Bangladesh
- Headquarters: Bangladesh Secretariat, Dhaka
- Annual budget: ৳18115 crore (US$1.5 billion) (2026-2027)
- Minister responsible: Andaleeve Rahman, Minister
- Ministry executives: Mokabbir Hossain, Senior Secretary
- Website: www.most.gov.bd

The Ministry of Science and Technology (Bengali: বিজ্ঞান ও প্রযুক্তি মন্ত্রণালয়; Bijñāna ō prajukti Montronaloya) (abbreviated as MOST) is a ministry of the government of Bangladesh which coordinates science and technology activities in Bangladesh.

== History ==
National Museum of Science and Technology was the best organization under the ministry for the 2019-2020 year.

== Agencies and departments under the MOST ==
- Bangladesh Atomic Energy Commission (BAEC)
- Bangladesh Council of Scientific and Industrial Research (BCSIR)
- National Museum of Science and Technology (NMST)
- Bangladesh National Scientific and Technical Documentation Centre (BANSDOC)
- Novo Theatre, Dhaka
- Bangladesh Atomic Energy Regulatory Authority (BAERA)
- National Institute of Biotechnology (NIB)
- Bangladesh Oceanographic Research Institute (BORI)
- Nuclear Power Plant Company Bangladesh Limited
- Science and Technology Fellowship Trust (STFT)

== See also ==
- Government of Bangladesh
- Science and technology in Bangladesh
