= Atomic Energy Research Establishment (Bangladesh) =

Research institute in Bangladesh

- Formation: 1975
- Type: Nuclear research institute
- Headquarters: Savar Upazila, Dhaka District, Bangladesh
- Region served: Bangladesh
- Official language: Bengali

Atomic Energy Research Establishment is a government nuclear research station in Bangladesh and is located in Savar Upazila, Bangladesh. It was built to develop skilled manpower trained in the uses of nuclear resources. It is under the control of Bangladesh Atomic Energy Commission and it is the largest institute under the commission.

== History ==
President Sheikh Mujibur Rahman ordered the establishment of an atomic research institute on 27 January 1973. Most of the research centres and educational institutions of Pakistan Atomic Energy Commission were in West Pakistan. At independence, Bangladesh only possessed Atomic Energy Centre in Dhaka, Bangladesh Institute of Nuclear Agriculture and three nuclear medical centres. Atomic Energy Research Establishment was established in 1975 at Ganakbari, Savar Upazila, Dhaka District. It was placed under the administration of Bangladesh Atomic Energy Commission, which had been facing manpower shortages since the Independence of Bangladesh in 1971.

In 1986 a 3 MWth TRIGA Mark-II research reactor was added to the establishment. The institution campus also has an AERE clinic, a Central Administration Division building, and a Central Finance and Accounts Division building. In 1999 the plan was placed to build Energy Unit, Central Engineering Workshop, and Central Library to add to the establishment.

=== Institutions ===
There are 12 independent institutions in its Savar campus that research nuclear related fields:

- Institute of Nuclear Science and Technology
- Institute of Food and Radiation Biology
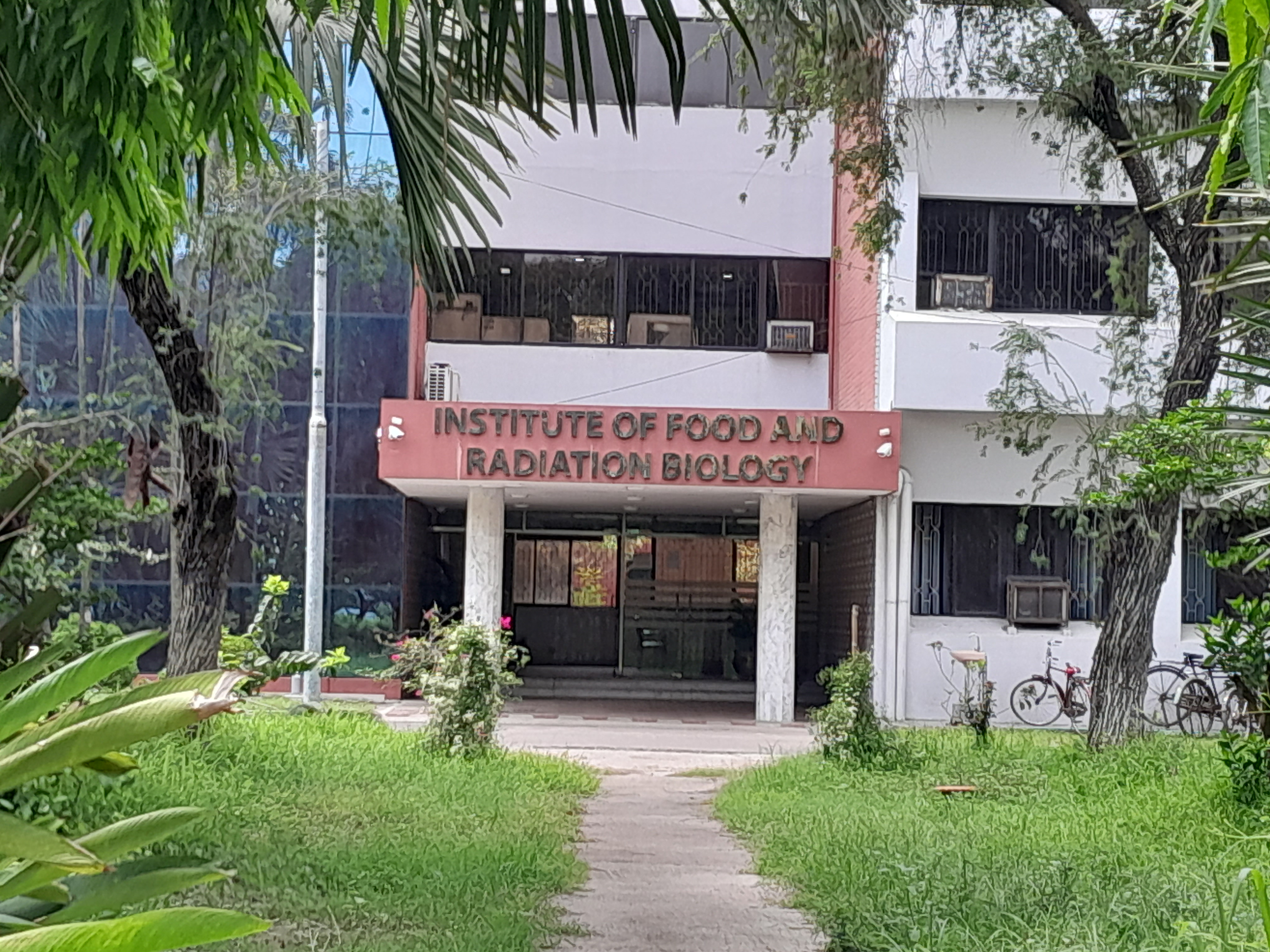
  Institute of Food and Radiation Biology
- Institute of Electronic
- Institute of Computer Science
- Institute of Radiation and Polymer Technology
- Institute of Tissue Banking and Biomaterial Research
- Institute of Nuclear Mineral
- Institute of Energy Science
- Training Institute
- Center for Research Reactor
- Central Engineering Facilities
- Scientific Information Unit
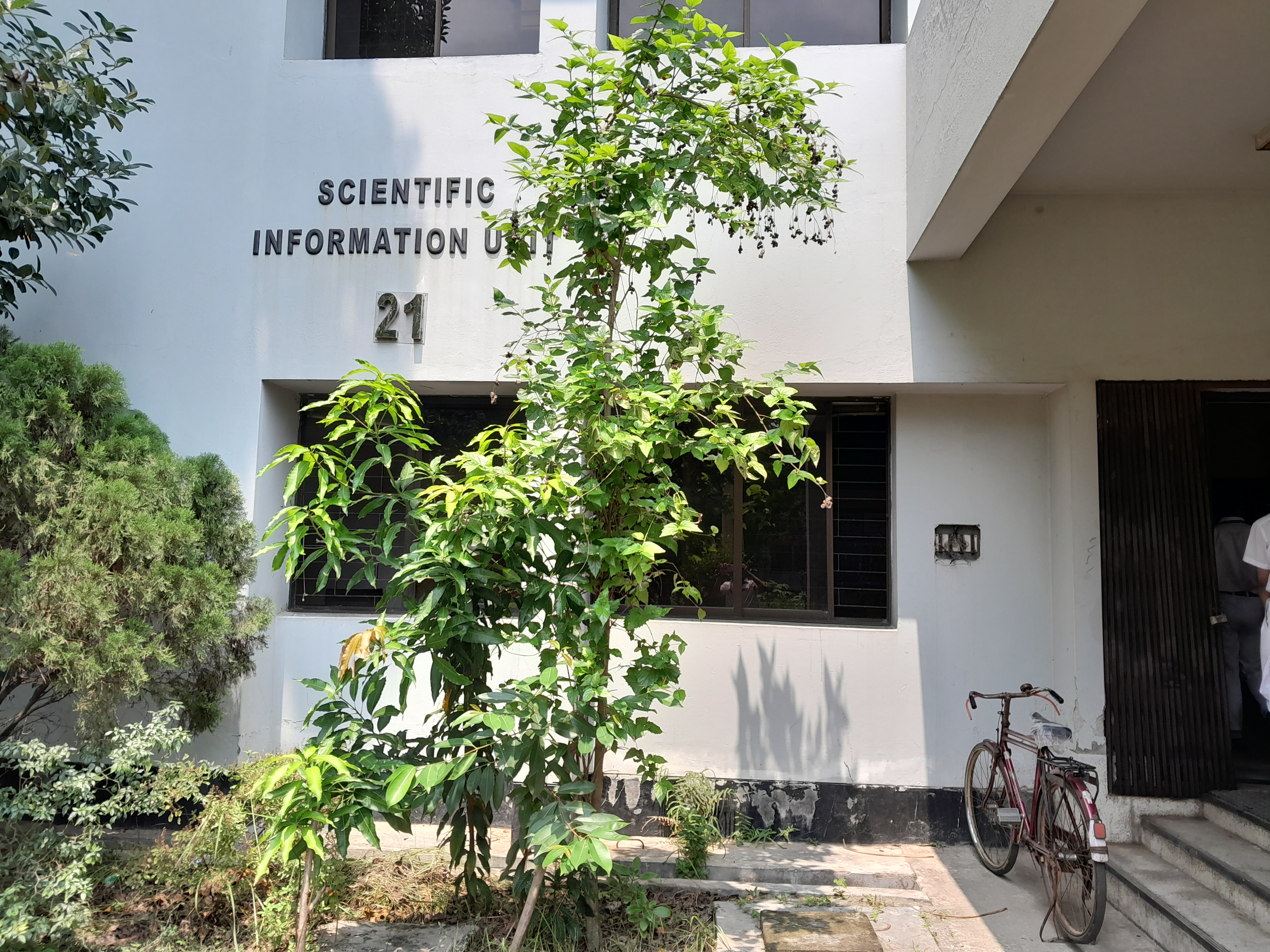
  Scientific Information Unit
