= Bangladesh Atomic Energy Regulatory Authority =

State nuclear energy regulatory body in Bangladesh

- বাংলাদেশ পরমাণু শক্তি নিয়ন্ত্রণ কর্তৃপক্ষ; Bangladesh Poromanu Shokti Niyontron Kortripokkho
- Government Seal of Bangladesh

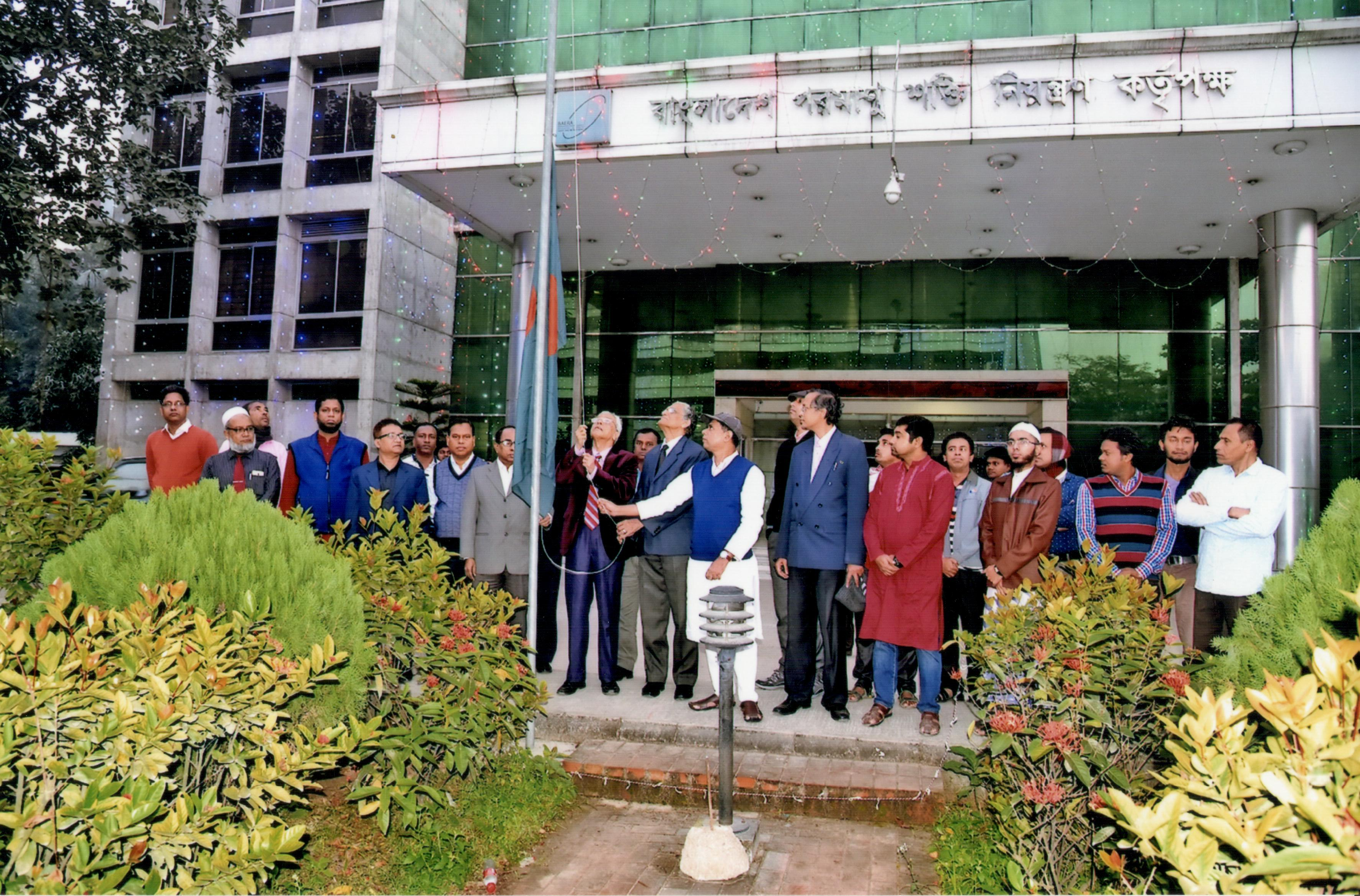
- Bangladesh Atomic Energy Regulatory Authority in Victory Day 2017

Agency overview
- Formed: 2013
- Headquarters: Agargaon, Dhaka, Bangladesh
- Agency executives: Mahmudul Hasan, Chairman
- Website: www.baera.gov.bd

Bangladesh Atomic Energy Regulatory Authority (Bengali: বাংলাদেশ পরমাণু শক্তি নিয়ন্ত্রণ কর্তৃপক্ষ) is a Bangladesh government regulatory agency under the Ministry of Science and Technology responsible for regulating nuclear energy in Bangladesh.

== History ==
The Bangladesh Atomic Energy Regulatory Authority was established in 2013 after the Bangladesh Atomic Energy Regulatory Act 2012 was passed by the parliament of Bangladesh. The authority is responsible for formulating safety rules regarding the use of nuclear energy. The agency is accountable to a special committee of the parliament of Bangladesh. The agency was formed on 12 February 2013. Naiyyum Choudhury was the founder chairman of the Authority and worked till his death in the post.

== Activities ==
BAERA oversees the safety aspects of the Rooppur Nuclear Power Plant. The authority gave the site license on 26 June 2016 and gave the required license for the design and construction of the plant on 4 November 2017. On 8 July 2018, BAERA granted the license for the second nuclear power plant in Rooppur.

== Gallery ==
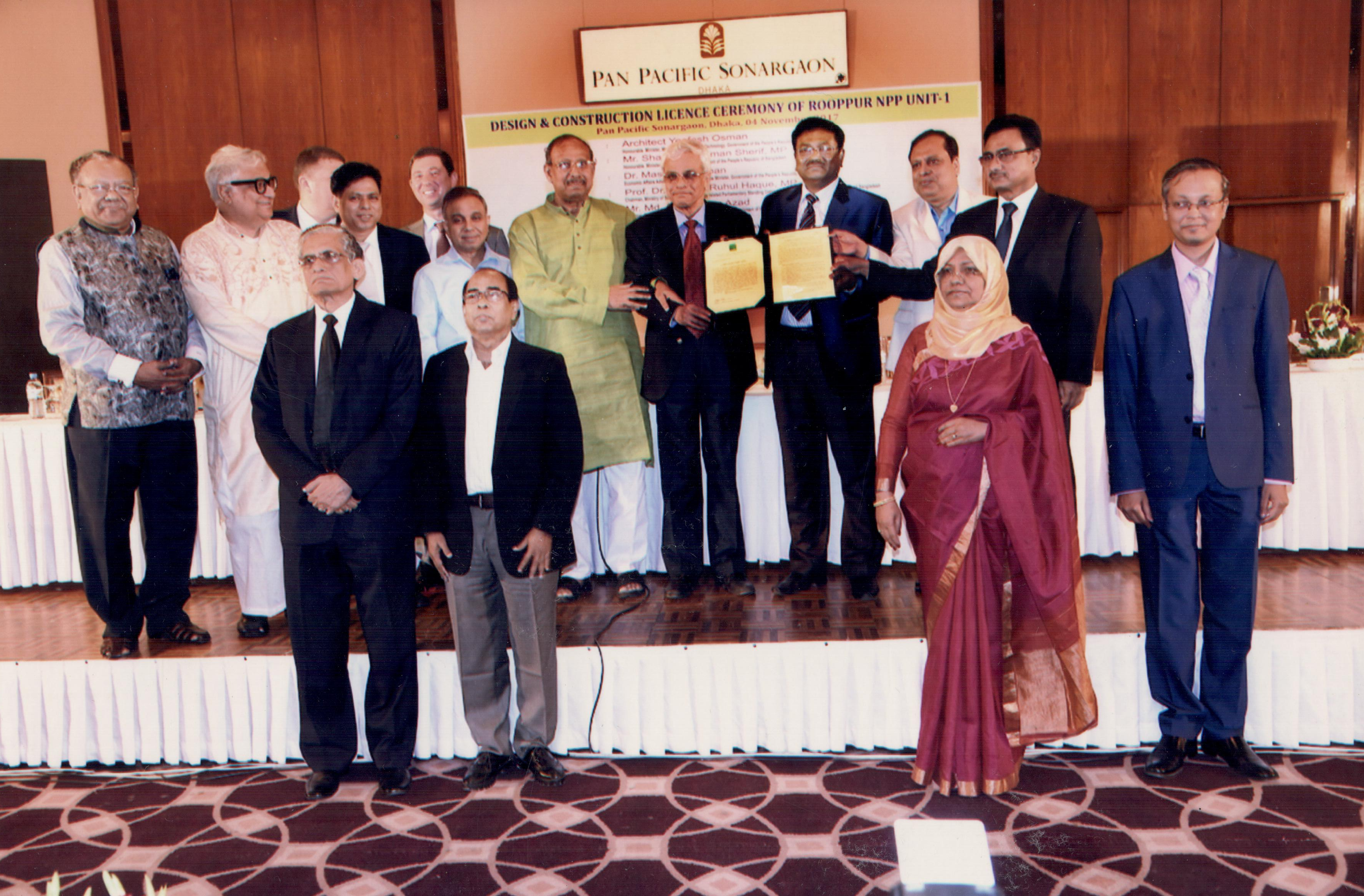
License Awarding Ceremony of the Rooppur Nuclear Power Plant

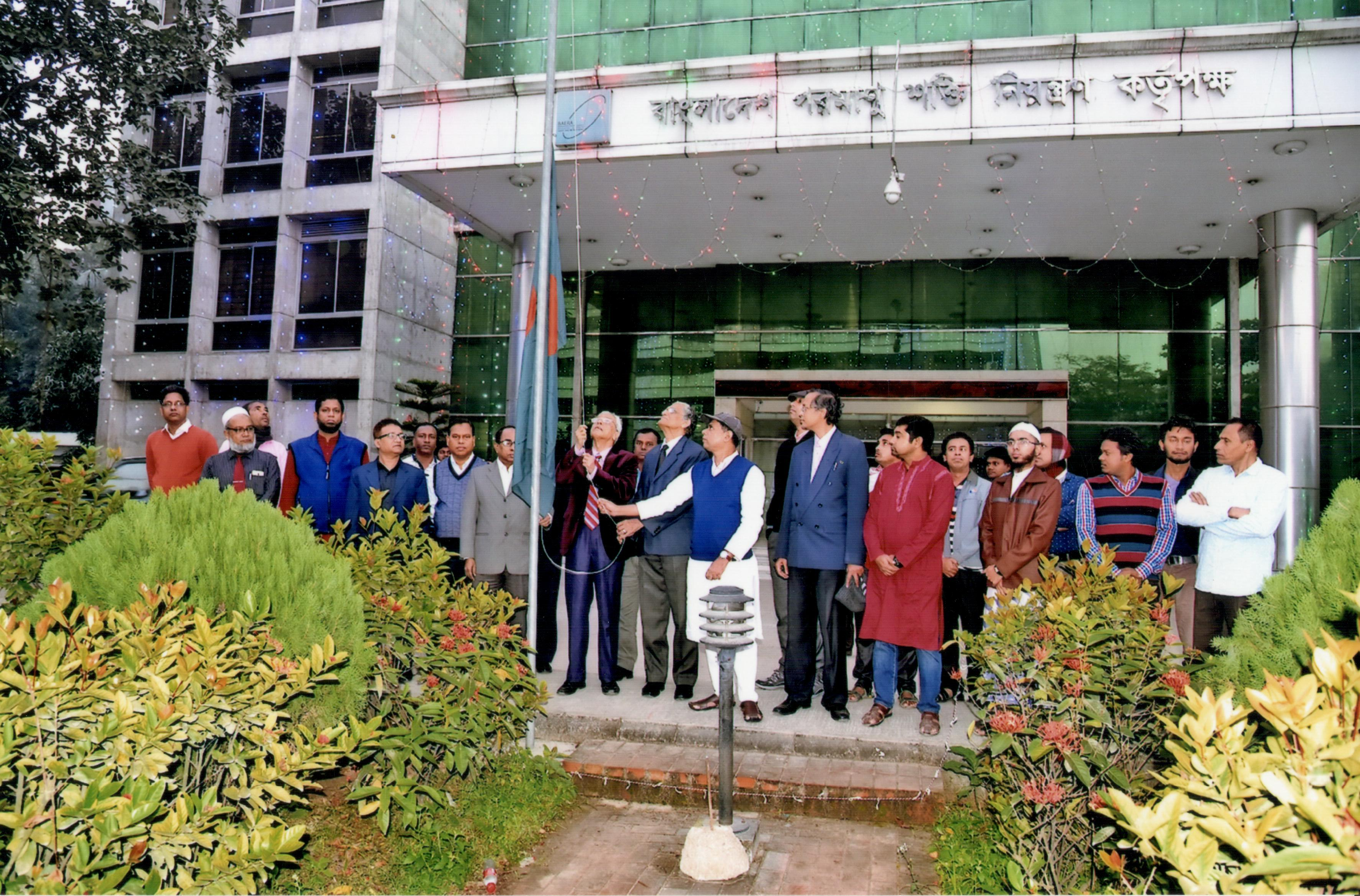
Bangladesh Atomic Energy Regulatory Authority in Victory Day 2017

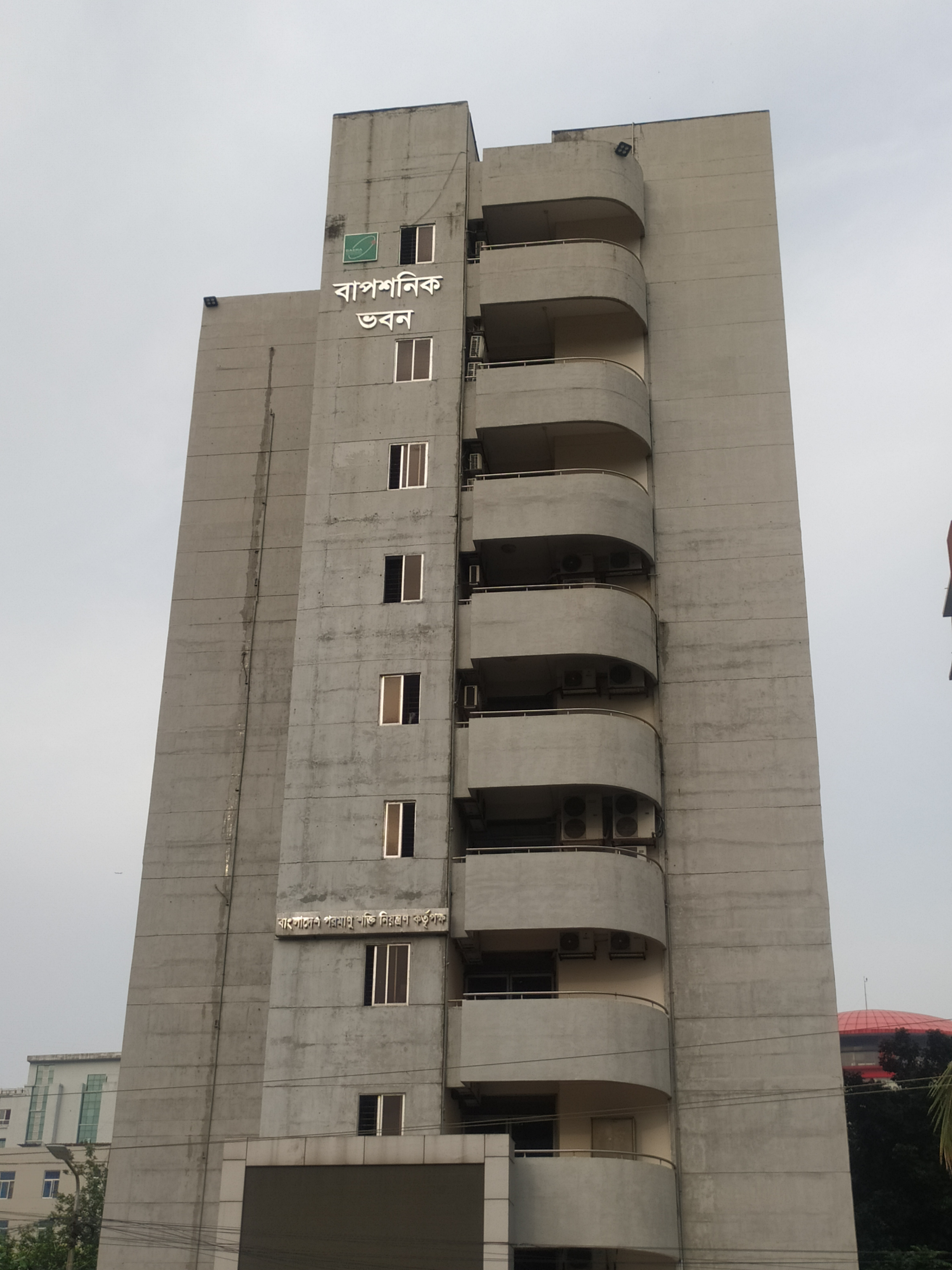
Bangladesh Atomic Energy Regulatory Authority Building
