= Ashraful Haque (botanist) =

Bangladeshi botanist and academic (1919–1982)

- আশরাফুল হক
- Haque at the John Innes Centre, 1952
- Born: 15 March 1919; Banaras, British Raj
- Died: 19 January 1982 (aged 62)
- Education: Banaras Hindu University; University of London
- Known for: Contributions to cytology and entomology; Former Vice-Chancellor of Bangladesh Agricultural University
- Scientific career
- Fields: Botany, Cytology, Entomology
- Workplaces: University of Dhaka; Bangladesh Agricultural University

Ashraful Haque (15 March 1919 – 19 January 1982) was a Bangladeshi botanist, cytologist, and academic. He served as the Vice-Chancellor of Bangladesh Agricultural University (BAU) and was an elected Fellow of the Bangladesh Academy of Sciences.

Haque was a Senior Fellow at the University of Oxford from 1966 to 1967 as well as a Visiting Professor at his alma mater, Banaras Hindu University, from 1977 to 1978. During the 1950s, he worked at the John Innes Horticultural Institution in the United Kingdom. There, he collaborated with the British geneticist C. D. Darlington on foundational research in cytology and entomology, co-authoring papers on chromosomal behavior and meiosis.

Haque acted as the Vice-Chancellor of Bangladesh Agricultural University. He served as the President of the Bangladesh Botanical Society from 1979 until his death in 1982. In his honor, Bangladesh Agricultural University established a residential student dormitory named "Ashraful Haque Hall" in 1982.
