= Cytologia =

Cytologia is a peer-reviewed scientific journal of cell science and genetics, including cytology, cytogenetics, and cell biology, on a wide range of organism. It is published by The Japan Mendel Society. The journal was established in 1929 by Kenjiro Fujii as the founding editor-in-chief.

== History ==
Cytologia was the first international journal published in Japan, with the first edition appearing in 1929 by Kenjiro Fujii. He first established cytogenetics research at the Tokyo Imperial University (now The University of Tokyo) in Japan and devoted himself to the study of genetics.

Hitoshi Kihara, who first proposed the concept of the "genome", was one of the most active contributors to Cytologia in the early days of the journal. Since his article was placed on the front page of the first issue (1929), he maintained annual contributions to Cytologia. In 1930, he published a paper in German entitled “Genomanalyse bei Triticum und Aegilops”. This paper is famous for proposing “genome analysis”, a cytogenetic method for revealing the genomic relationships between biological species.

George W. Beadle, a Nobel Prize laureate and a founder of Biochemical Genetics, also contributed to Cytologia. His paper entitled “A Gene in Zea mays for Failure of Cytokinesis during Meiosis” was published on Cytologia in 1932. The paper first proposed the idea of meiosis being genetically controlled.
