= National Museum of Science and Technology (Bangladesh) =

- জাতীয় বিজ্ঞান ও প্রযুক্তি জাদুঘর

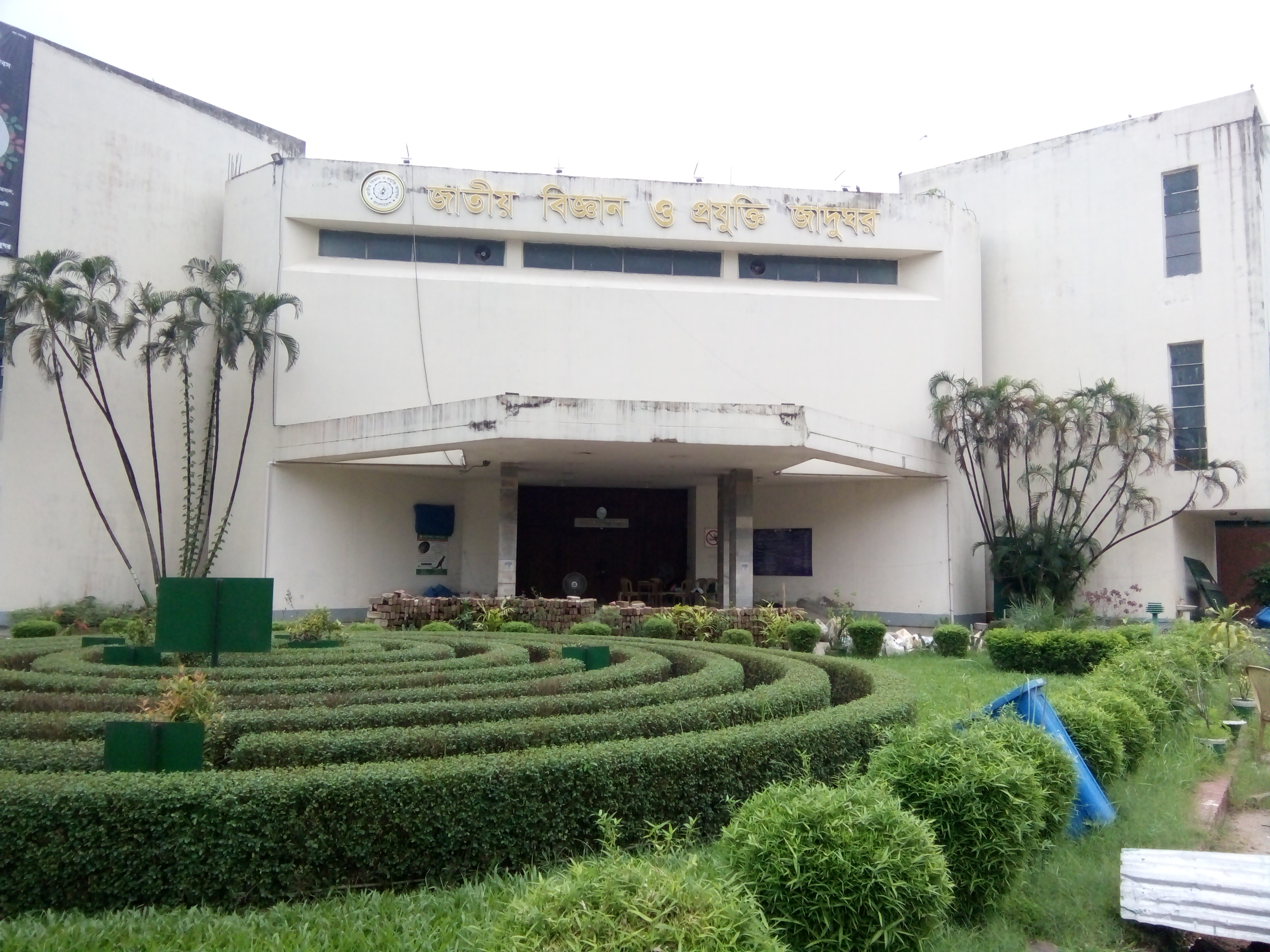

- Location within Bangladesh
- Established: 26 April 1965
- Location: Dhaka, Bangladesh
- Coordinates: 23.7788°N 90.3716°E
- Type: Science museum
- Accreditation: Asia Pacific Network of Science & Technology Centres (ASPAC)
- Visitors: 4,000 per month
- Director: Mohammad Munir Chowdhury (Director General)
- Curators: Sukalyan Bachhar (Senior Curator), Md. Anisur Rahman, Masudue Rahman, Md. Abdul Aziz
- Owner: Ministry of Science and Technology
- Parking: Yes
- Website: nmst.gov.bd

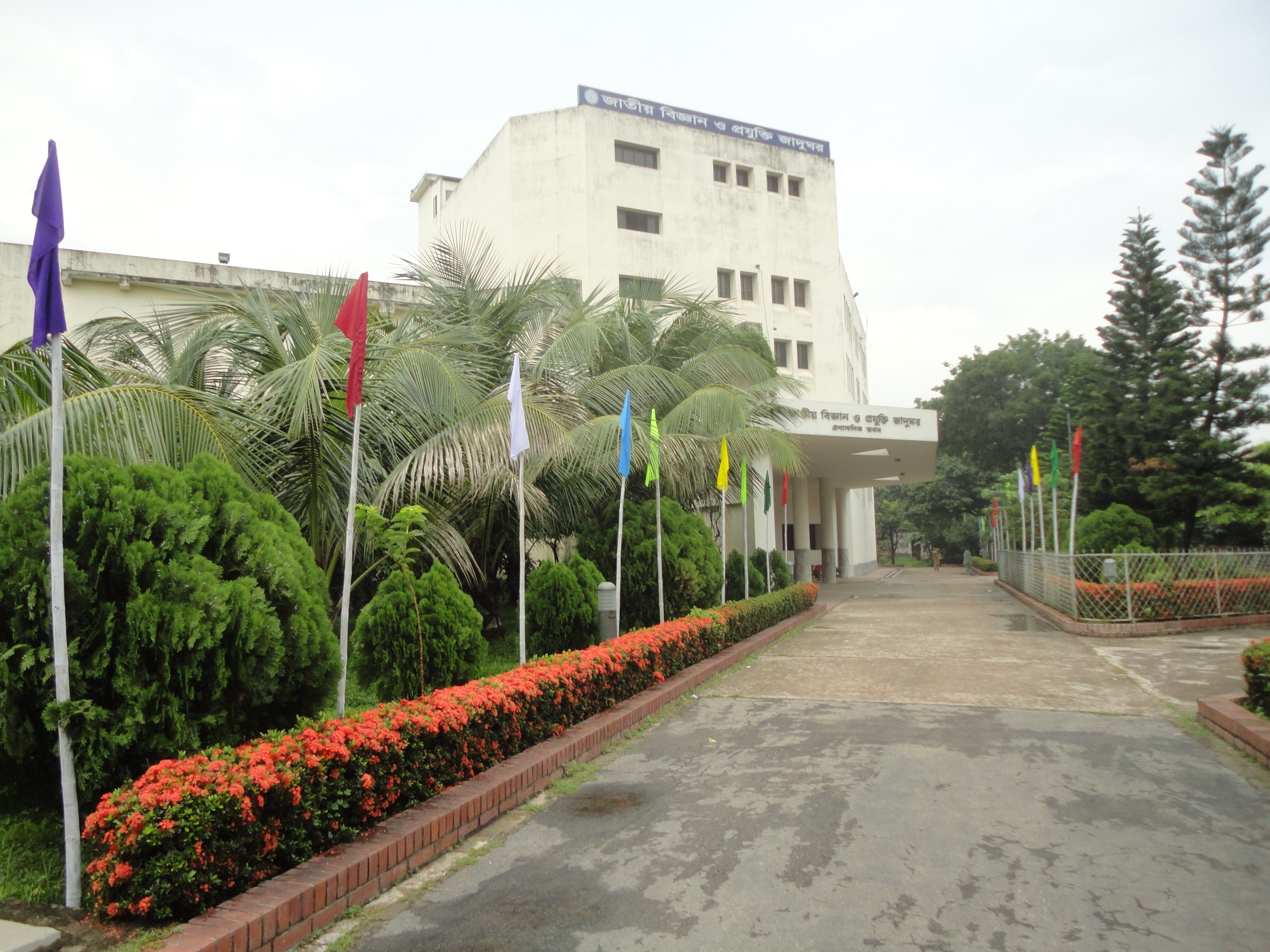
Entrance to the National Museum of Science and Technology

The National Museum of Science and Technology (NMST) (Bengali: জাতীয় বিজ্ঞান ও প্রযুক্তি জাদুঘর, romanized: Jātīẏa Bijñāna ō Prayukti Jādughara) in Dhaka, Bangladesh was founded on April 26, 1965, by the Pakistani government and became a part of Bangladesh's Ministry of Science and Technology following the Bangladesh Liberation War. It was first based in the Dhaka Public Library, and moved a number of times before its permanent home was completed in 1981. The NMST serves as Bangladesh's only science museum and organizes science education activities at a national level.

== Exhibits ==
The museum has several galleries such as its physical science gallery, fun science gallery (1 & 2), biological science gallery, technological gallery, IT gallery, space science gallery, young scientist's gallery, science library, a sky observatory, and science park. In addition to its permanent exhibits the museum also puts on popular science lectures, scientific film shows and a children's science festival.

== National Science and Technology Week ==
NMST organizes National Science & Technology Week every year both at a district and national level. Only two participants from each district (one from junior level and the other from senior or college level) can participate at the national level. Students whose projects are selected as viable from each science week are encouraged to further develop their projects (see below).

=== Young scientist activities ===
NMST assists with student science projects both financially and technologically. Each year NMST selects potential projects according to national interest and socioeconomic benefit, and these projects are developed for a three-month period. Each student is given a monthly allowance and assigned a mentor who is an expert in the relevant field. In addition, a special workshop and the required raw materials are provided.

== Publications ==
Young Scientist (Bengali: নবীন বিজ্ঞানী — Nabin Biggani), a quarterly science magazine

Innovation (Bengali: উদ্ভাবন — Udbhaban), a yearly report on young scientists

A yearly report on science and technology Week from the national level

Yearly proceedings on popular science conducted by the museum

== Gallery ==
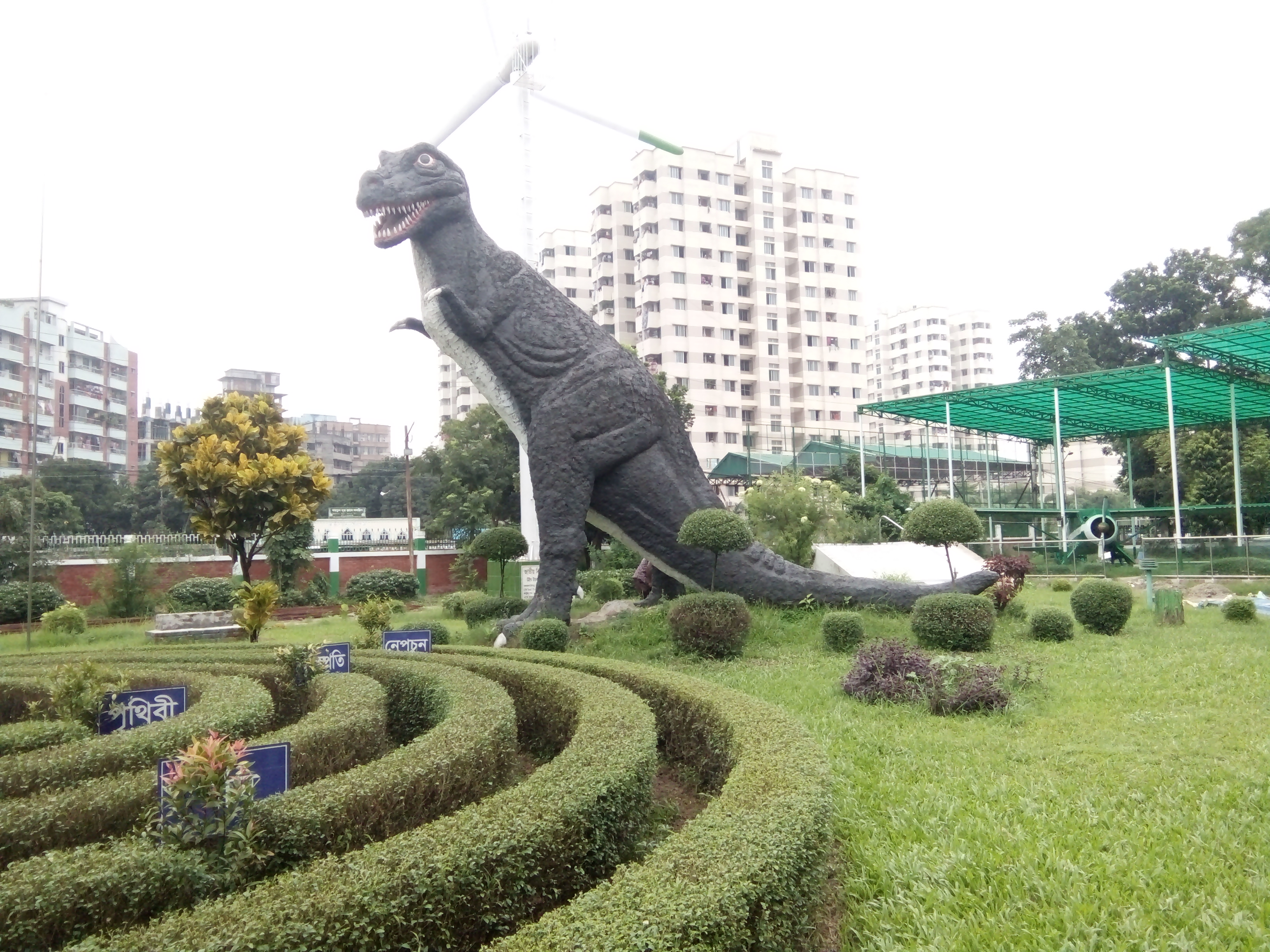
Statues of Dinosaur National Museum of Science and Technology

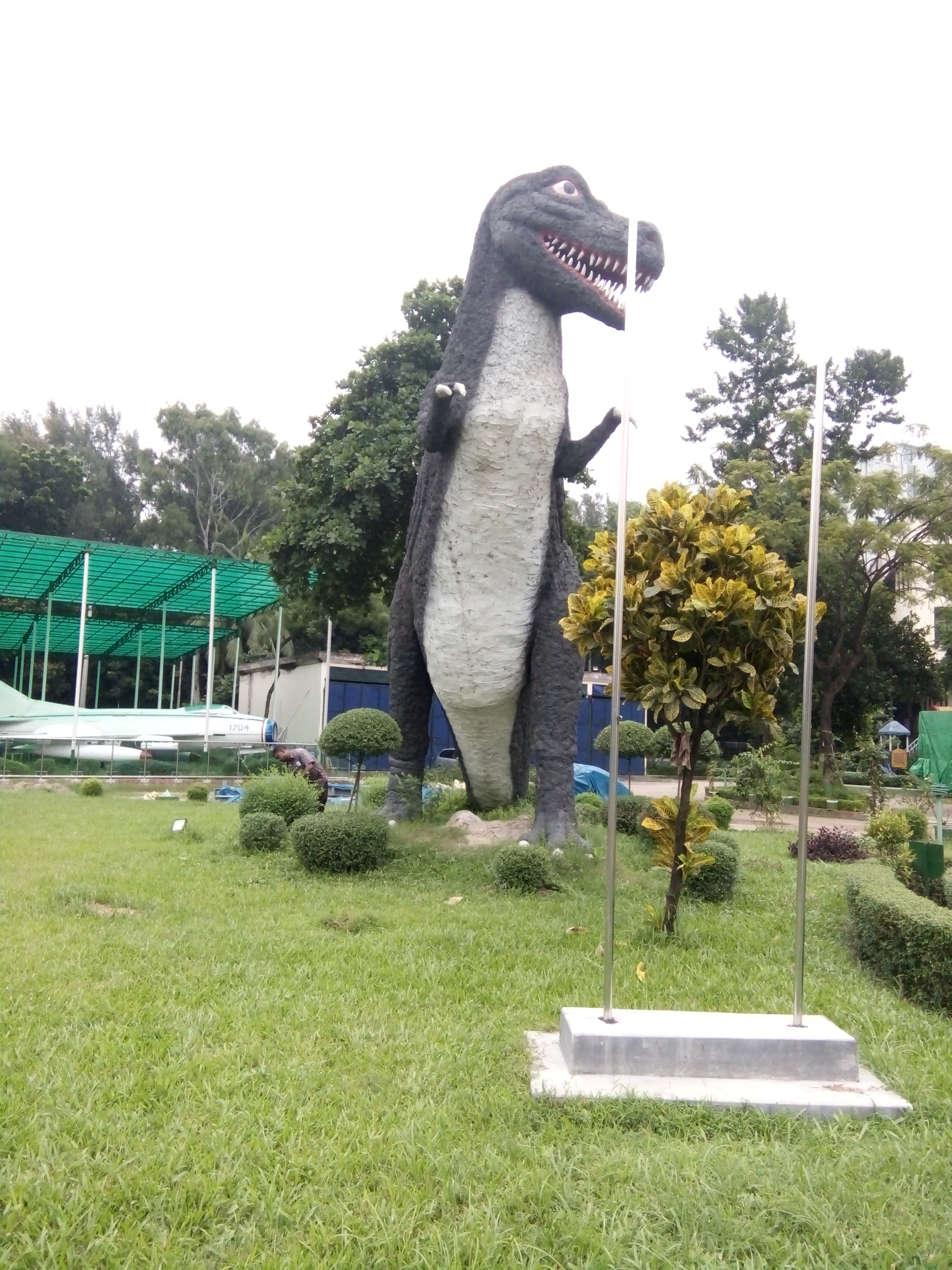
Statues of Dinosaur National Museum of Science and Technology

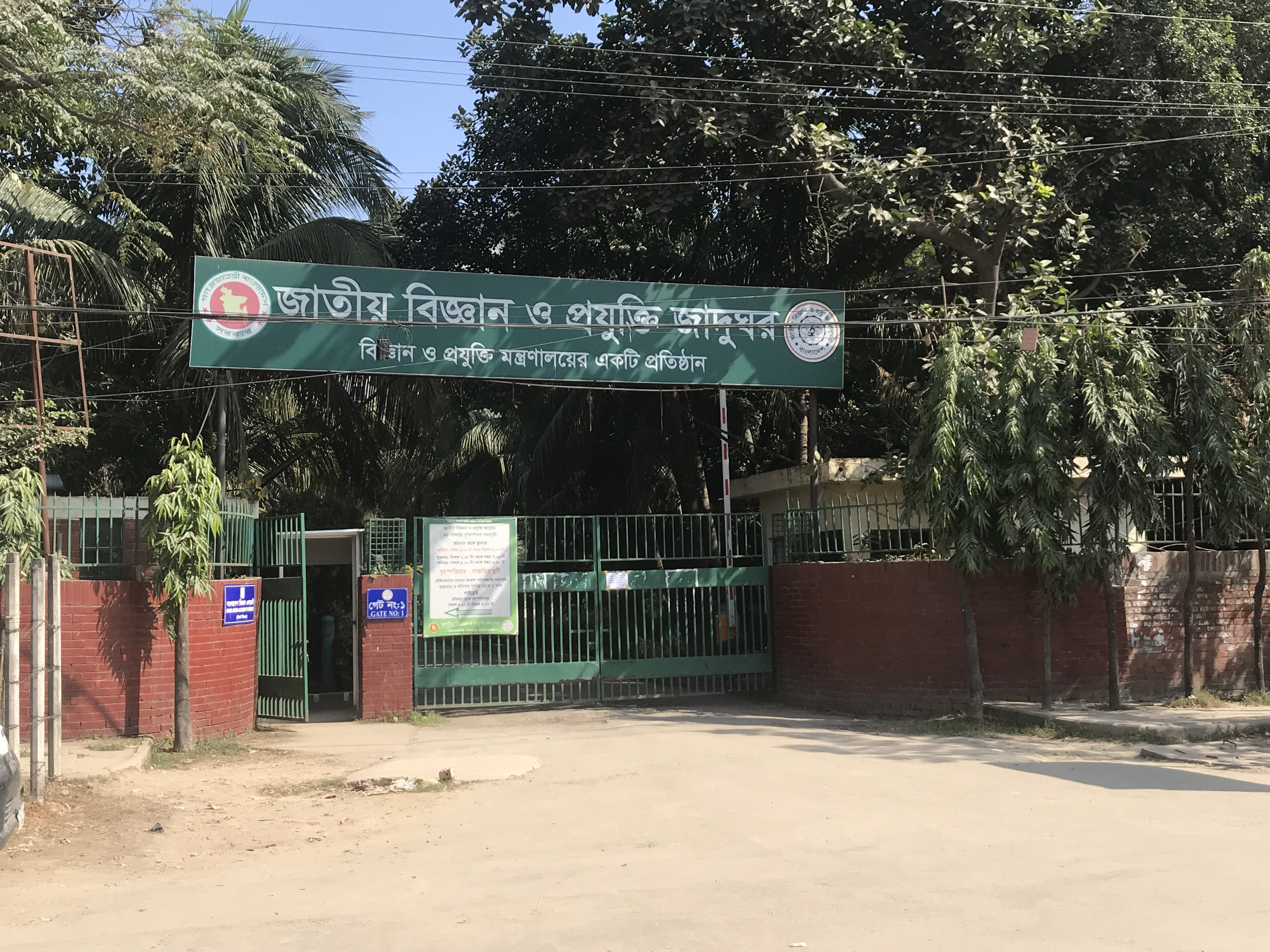
National Museum of Science and Technology

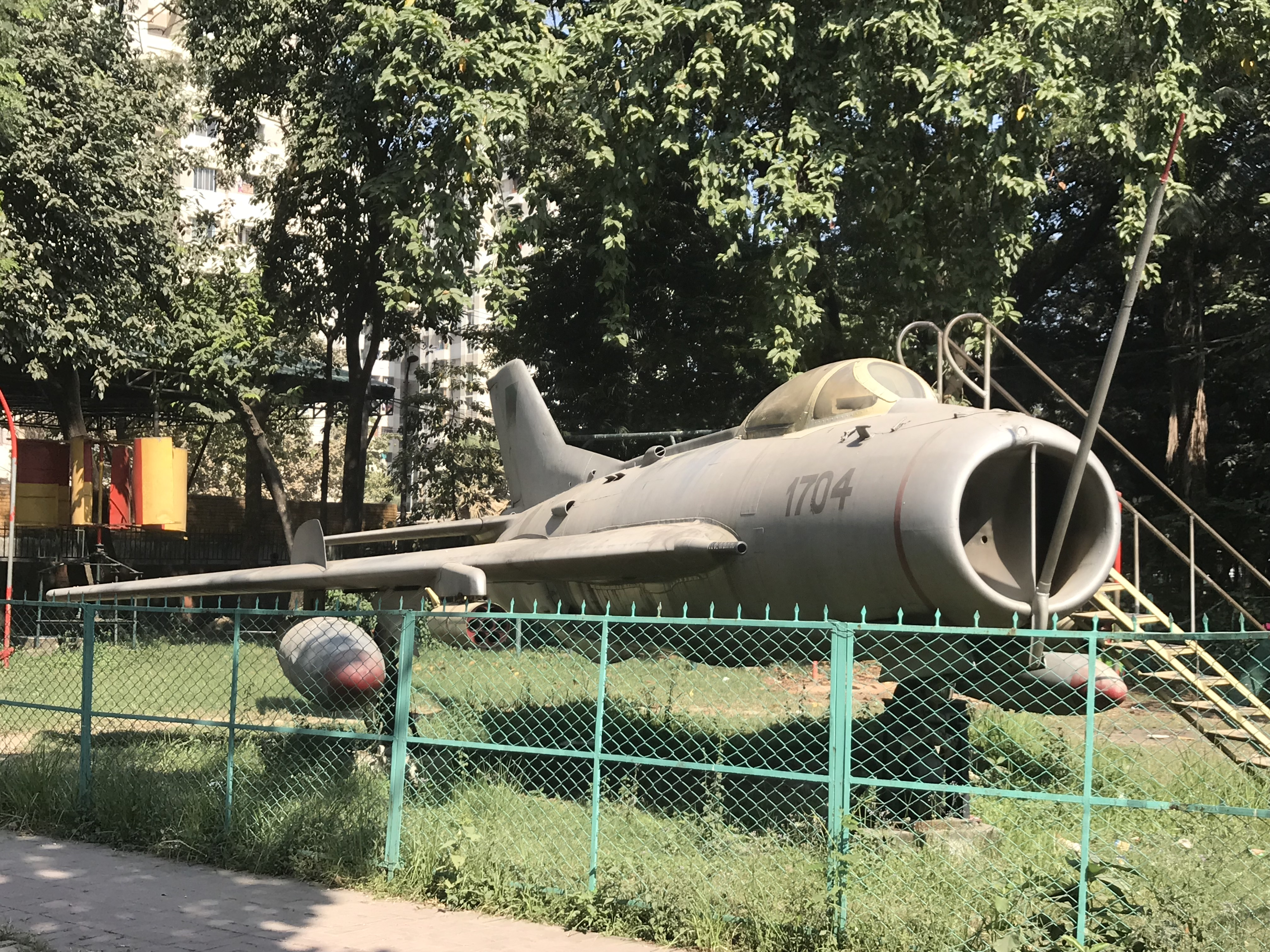
National Museum of Science and Technology

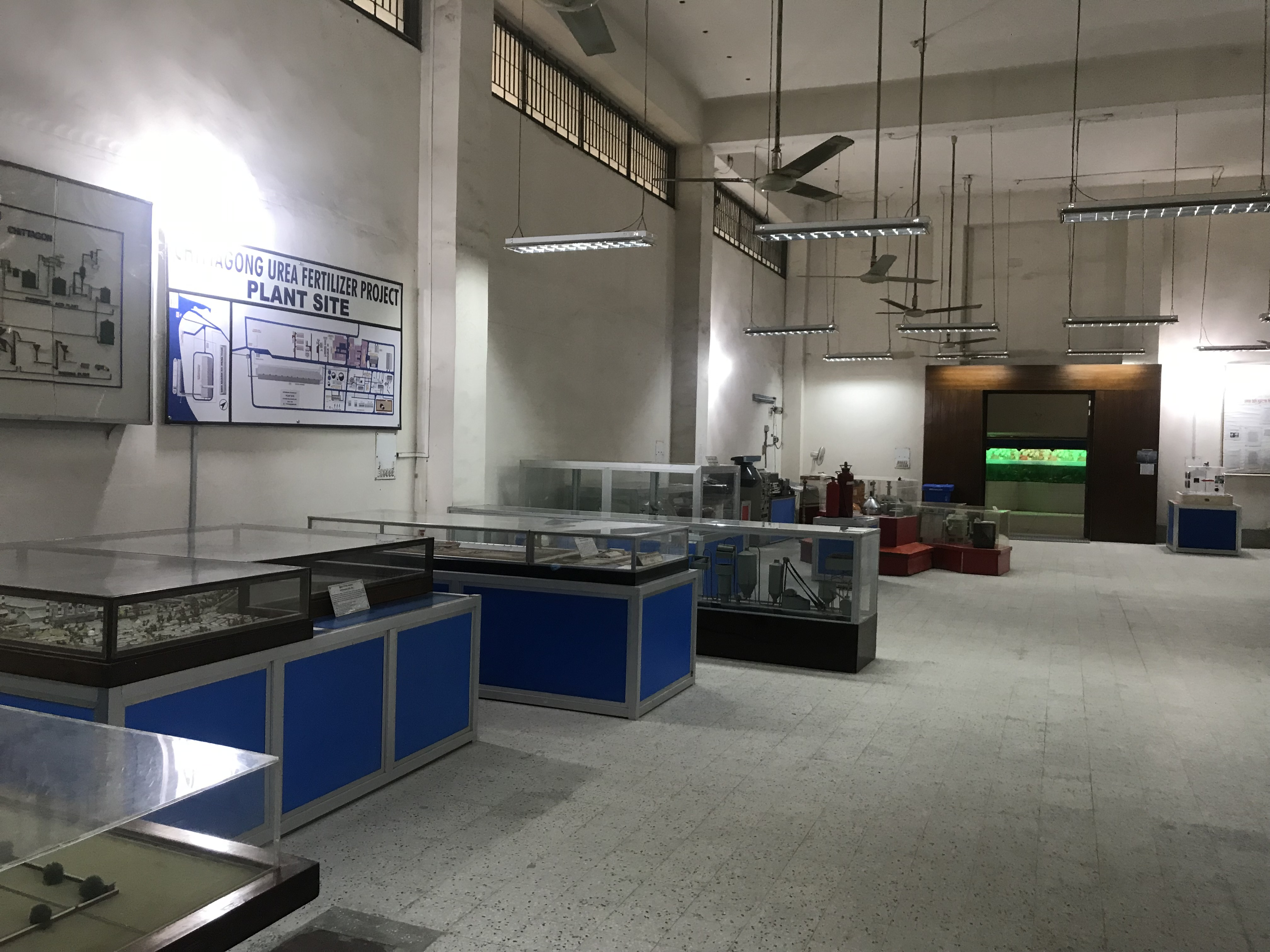
National Museum of Science and Technology

== See also ==
- Science and technology in Bangladesh
