= Gopalganj Medical College =

- গোপালগঞ্জ মেডিকেল কলেজ
- Former name: Sheikh Sayera Khatun Medical College
- Type: Public medical school
- Established: 2011
- Academic affiliations: University of Dhaka
- Principal: Dr. Amal Chandra Paul
- Students: 300
- Undergraduates: M.B.B.S
- Location: Gopalganj Sadar Upazila, Bangladesh; 22.9934°N 89.8204°E
- Campus: Urban
- Language: English
- Website: https://www.ggmc.edu.bd/

Gopalganj Medical College (Bengali: গোপালগঞ্জ মেডিকেল কলেজ) is a government medical college in Bangladesh.

== History ==
Gopalganj Medical College was established in 2011. It is located in Gopalganj. The college is affiliated with Dhaka University as a constituent college.

Gopalganj Medical College began with only 50 students and few infrastructure facilities. The first step in its creation and expansion was the training of undergraduate students.

Sheikh Sayera Khatun Medical College was renamed to Gopalganj Medical College Hospital in November 2024 after the fall of the Sheikh Hasina led Awami League government.

== Organization and administration ==
In 2014, the Directorate General of Health Services (DGHS) was reportedly unable to attract applicants for lectureships at the college in the basic subjects of anatomy, biochemistry, and physiology. As a stop gap measure, the college borrowed teachers from other medical schools in order to keep classes running.

== Entrance examination ==
Every year, after passing their Higher Secondary School Certificate examinations, nearly 1,20,000 applicants from all over the country sit for the medical college admission test. The top 5300 students get the opportunity to study at the government Medical Colleges.

== See also ==
- List of medical colleges in Bangladesh
