= Bangladesh Energy and Power Research Council =

Bangladeshi government agency

- Formation: 2015
- Headquarters: Dhaka, Bangladesh
- Region served: Bangladesh
- Official language: Bengali
- Website: eprc.gov.bd

Bangladesh Energy and Power Research Council (Bengali: বাংলাদেশ জ্বালানি ও বিদ্যুৎ গবেষণা কাউন্সিল) is a government agency responsible for providing funding and support to research institutions and Startup companies in the power sector. It provides long term planning and evaluation on the energy and power sector to the government. Mohammad Wahid Hossain ndc is the chairman of Bangladesh Energy and Power Research Council.

== History ==
Bangladesh Energy and Power Research Council was established by passing the Bangladesh Energy and Power Research Council Act, 2015, in the parliament. The law had been approved by the cabinet of Bangladesh.

In May 2019, Subir Kishore Chowdhury was made chairman of Bangladesh Energy and Power Research Council replacing Shahin Ahmed Chowdhury.
