= Institute of Food and Radiation Biology =

Research institute in Bangladesh

- Formation: 1974
- Headquarters: Savar, Bangladesh
- Region served: Bangladesh
- Official language: Bengali

Institute of Food and Radiation Biology (IFRB) is a government research institute that studies methods for food preservation through irradiation. The institute is part of the Bangladesh Atomic Energy Commission.

== History ==
The institute was established on 1974 as the Irradiation and Pest Control Research Institute. In 1979, the institute was moved to Atomic Energy Research Establishment and renamed Institute of Food and Radiation Biology. The institute has an irradiation facility that offers its services at subsidized rate to Bangladeshi companies. The institute has a cobalt-60 gamma irradiator that is operated by the Gamma Source Division.

== List of Divisions ==
Abbreviation	Divisions
AERD	Agrochemical & Environmental Research Division
FSQAD	Food Safety and Quality Analysis Division
GSU	Gamma Source Unit
IBD	Insect Biotechnology Division
MIID	Microbiology and Industrial Irradiation Division
MRBD	Molecular Radiobiology and Biodosimetry Division
PBGED	Plant Biotechnology and Genetic Engineering Division
READ	Radiation Entomology and Acarology Division
VDRAD	Veterinary Drug Residue Analysis Division
