= National Institute of Biotechnology =

Research institute in Bangladesh

Coordinates: 23.9615°N 90.2789°E

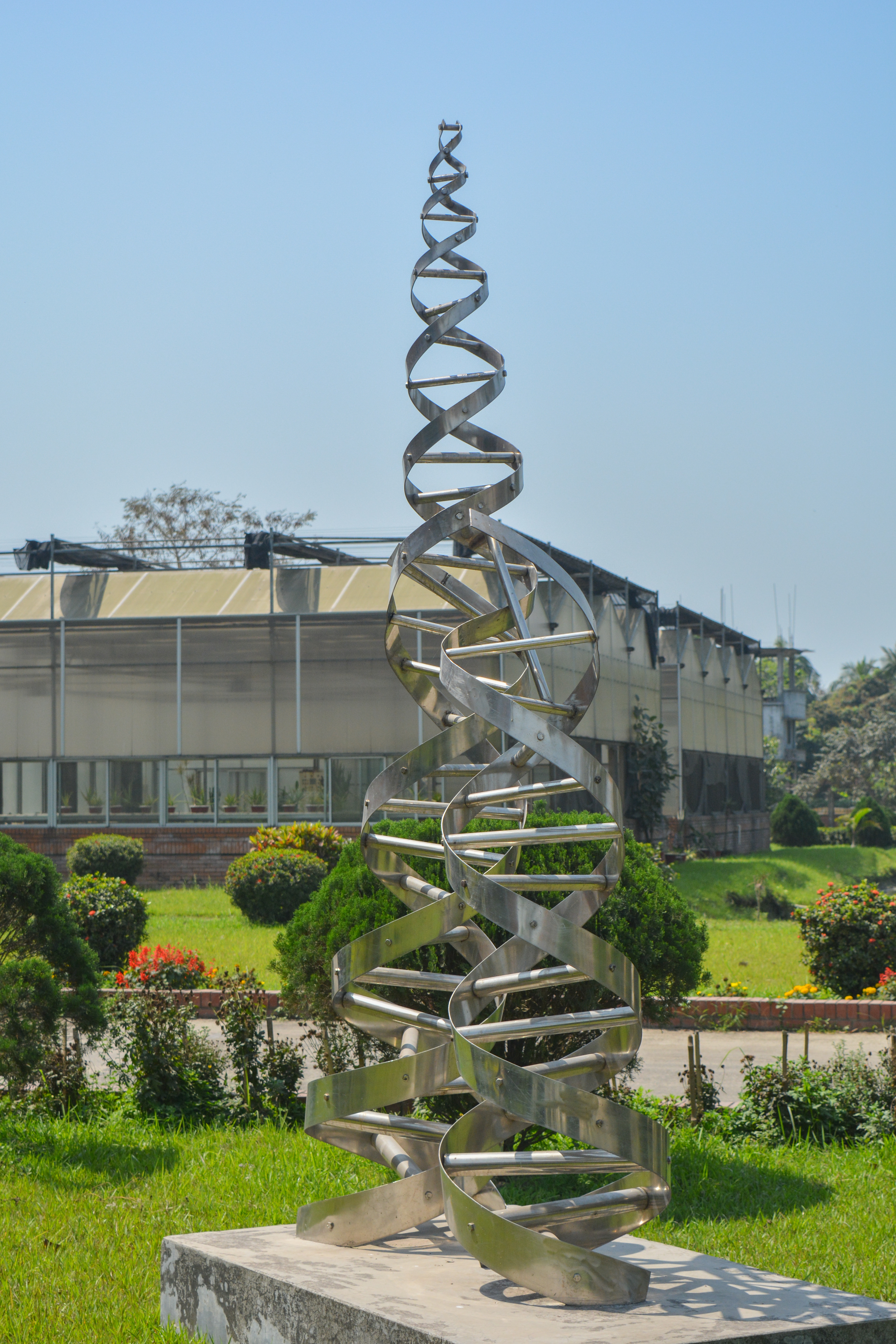
- Established: 1999
- Focus: Biotechnology
- Key people: Dr. Md. Sagir Ahmed (Director General)
- Location: Savar, Dhaka Division, Bangladesh
- Website: http://www.nib.gov.bd/

National Institute of Biotechnology (NIB) (Bengali: ন্যাশনাল ইনস্টিটিউট অব বায়োটেকনোলজি) is a government research institute in Bangladesh under the Ministry of Science and Technology.

== History ==
It was established in 2010 by the government as part of an ADP(Annual Development Project) project (started in 1999) to intensify the biotechnological research in the country. Dr. Naiyyum Choudhury was the founding project director of the institute. The main objective of the institute is to coordinate the biotechnological research carried out throughout the country as well as conducting its own research programs in different areas of biotechnology. The institute is also responsible for creating skilled manpower for biotechnology and genetic engineering.

Started from 2009 National Institute of Biotechnology started many job opportunities with help of NIB Job Circular portal. Many scientists are already working in this government institute.
