= Beach Sand Minerals Exploitation Centre =

Research institute in Bangladesh

- Formation: 1980
- Headquarters: Kolatoli Square, Cox's Bazar, Bangladesh
- Region served: Bangladesh
- Official language: Bengali
- Website: baec.gov.bd

Beach Sand Minerals Exploitation Centre is an autonomous national research institute which carries out research on sand and minerals in Bangladesh and is located in Kalatali, Cox's Bazar District, Bangladesh. It has a pilot project for the extraction of sands from the beaches in Cox's Bazar District.

== History ==
In 1961, the Geological Survey of Pakistan discovered radioactive and heavy metal in beach sands. Pakistan Atomic Energy Commission carried out surveys in 1967. Beach Sand Minerals Exploitation Centre was formed to exploit those minerals found in sands of coastal East Pakistan. It is now under the administration of Bangladesh Atomic Energy Commission. It was established in 1980 as the Beach Sand Exploitation Centre. The Beach Sand Exploitation Centre was renamed to Beach Sand Minerals Exploitation Centre later.
