= Science and technology in Bangladesh =

In Bangladesh, the cultivation of modern science started during the British Raj when the first modern educational institutions, focused on scientific fields, were established in the Bengal Presidency. The University of Dhaka, established in 1921, acted as the driving force in producing many renowned scientists in Bangladesh.

Since its independence in 1971, Bangladesh has been plagued with many social issues such as poverty and illiteracy, and science and technology have lagged behind in the priority list of the successive governments. However, induced by the recent economic progress, science and technology has been witnessing intense growth in the country after a period of stagnation, most notably in the information technology and biotechnology sectors. The national policies for science and technology is planned and developed by the National Council for Science and Technology which is controlled by the ministry of science and technology. Bangladesh was ranked 106th in the Global Innovation Index in 2025.

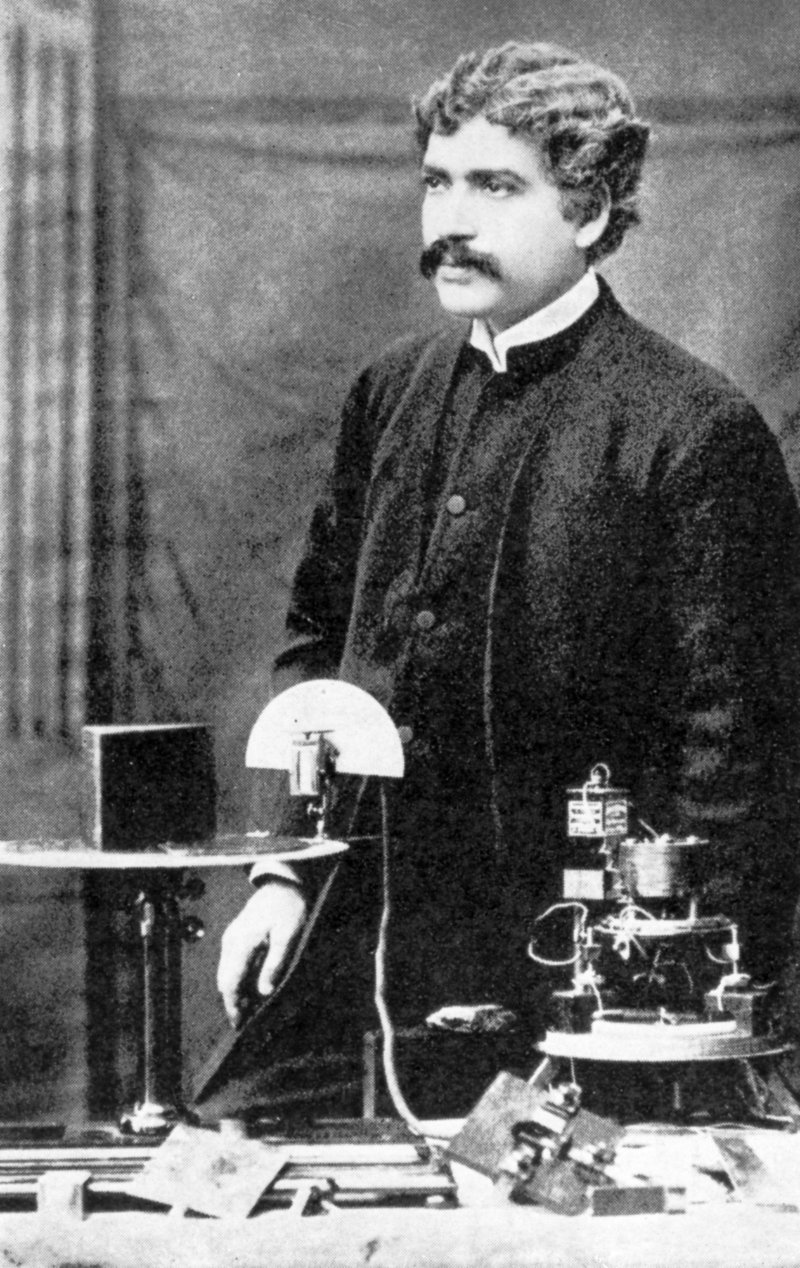
Jagadish Chandra Bose, Bengali-born Scientist from Bikrampur, Bangladesh (During British colonization in the subcontinent) who invented that plants have life too

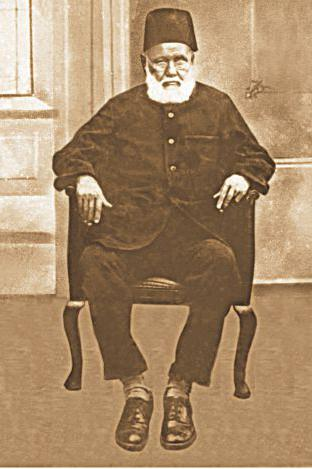
Khan Bahadur Qazi Azizul Haque, a Bengali scientist from the British period who invented fingerprint classification

== History ==
The history of science began after the establishment of the British Empire in the Bengal region. The educational reforms during this period gave birth to many distinguished scientists in the region. Sir Jagadish Chandra Bose pioneered the investigation of radio and microwave optics, made very significant contributions to plant science, and laid the foundations of experimental science in the Indian subcontinent. IEEE named him one of the fathers of radio science. He was the first person from the Indian subcontinent to receive a US patent, in 1904. In 1924–25, while researching at the University of Dhaka, Prof Satyendra Nath Bose well known for his works in quantum mechanics, provided the foundation for Bose–Einstein statistics and the theory of the Bose–Einstein condensate.

After the Partition of India in 1947, Bangladesh or erstwhile East Bengal (later named as East Pakistan) became a part of the Muslim majority Dominion of Pakistan and several talented Hindu scientists of Bangladeshi origin decided for moving to the Dominion of India because of the growing communal dissonance in the region. The regional branch of Pakistan Council of Scientific and Industrial Research was established in 1955 in Dhaka, which was the first scientific research organisation in East Pakistan. It was later renamed as Bangladesh Council of Scientific and Industrial Research. The economic and other discriminations towards East Pakistan and extensive investments in militarisation by the central Government of Pakistan led to a slow growth in the positive development of science and technology in this period. At the time of independence of Bangladesh, there were six research organisations with twenty institutions operating under their authority.

After gaining independence in 1971, some more research institutions began to be established. Several universities were also established focusing on major disciplines of science and technology. In 1983, the National Committee on Science and Technology was created, having the President of Bangladesh as its head, to set up a national policy.

The government of Bangladesh passed a university act in 1986 to give special importance in science and technology education. Shahjalal University of Science and Technology was established as the first specialised science & technology university of the country. After SUST, seven more science and technology universities have been established in Bangladesh.

== See also ==
- Biotechnology and genetic engineering in Bangladesh
- Information technology in Bangladesh
- National Museum of Science and Technology
