= Atomic Energy Centre, Dhaka =

Research institute in Bangladesh

Atomic Energy Centre
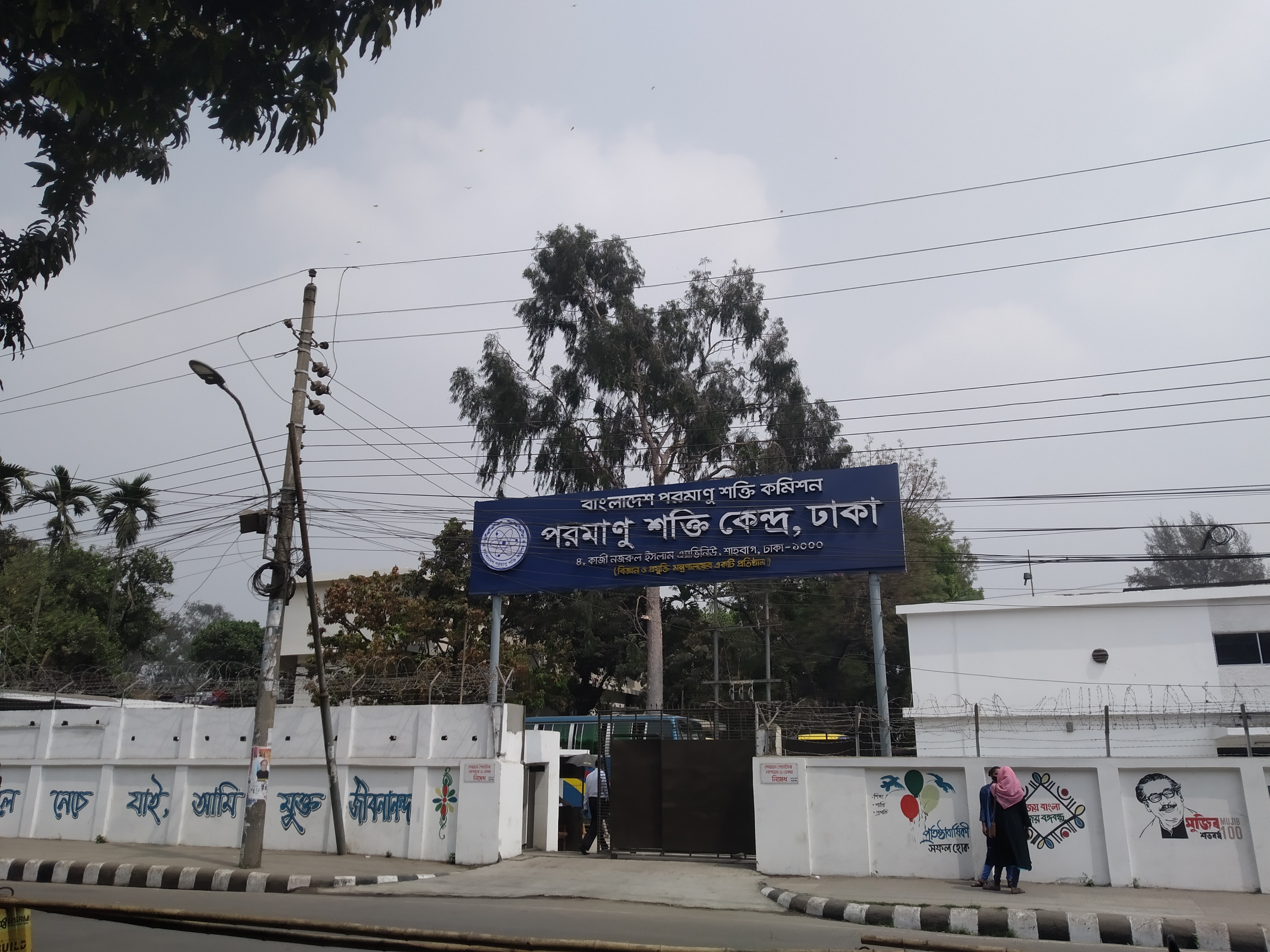
- Formation: 1964
- Purpose: Nuclear research
- Headquarters: Dhaka, Bangladesh
- Region served: Bangladesh
- Official language: Bengali
- Website: Atomic Energy Centre

Atomic Energy Centre is the oldest nuclear research centre in Bangladesh and is located in the capital Dhaka. It falls within the campus of University of Dhaka and is under the management of Bangladesh Atomic Energy Commission.

== History ==
Atomic Energy Centre was completed in December 1964 and was formally inaugurated on 27 April 1965 by Pakistan Atomic Energy Commission. The facility had a 5000 curie Cobalt-60 gamma radiation source, an IBM 1620 computer, and a Van de Graaff accelerator. On 16 December 1971 Bangladesh Liberation war ended and Bangladesh became an independent country. On 3 March 1972 a scientist was made an Officer on Special Duty in the Ministry of Education and Cultural Affairs in charge of atomic affairs. Through a presidential order on 27 February 1973 Bangladesh Atomic Energy Commission was formed and the centre was placed under it. The centre has developed Iratom-24 and Iratom-38, two high yielding rice variety and one high yield pulse called Hyprosola. The centre researched ways of preserving food through radiation and the sterilisation of medical equipment.
