= Dhaka District =

Dhaka District ঢাকা জেলা
- District of Bangladesh
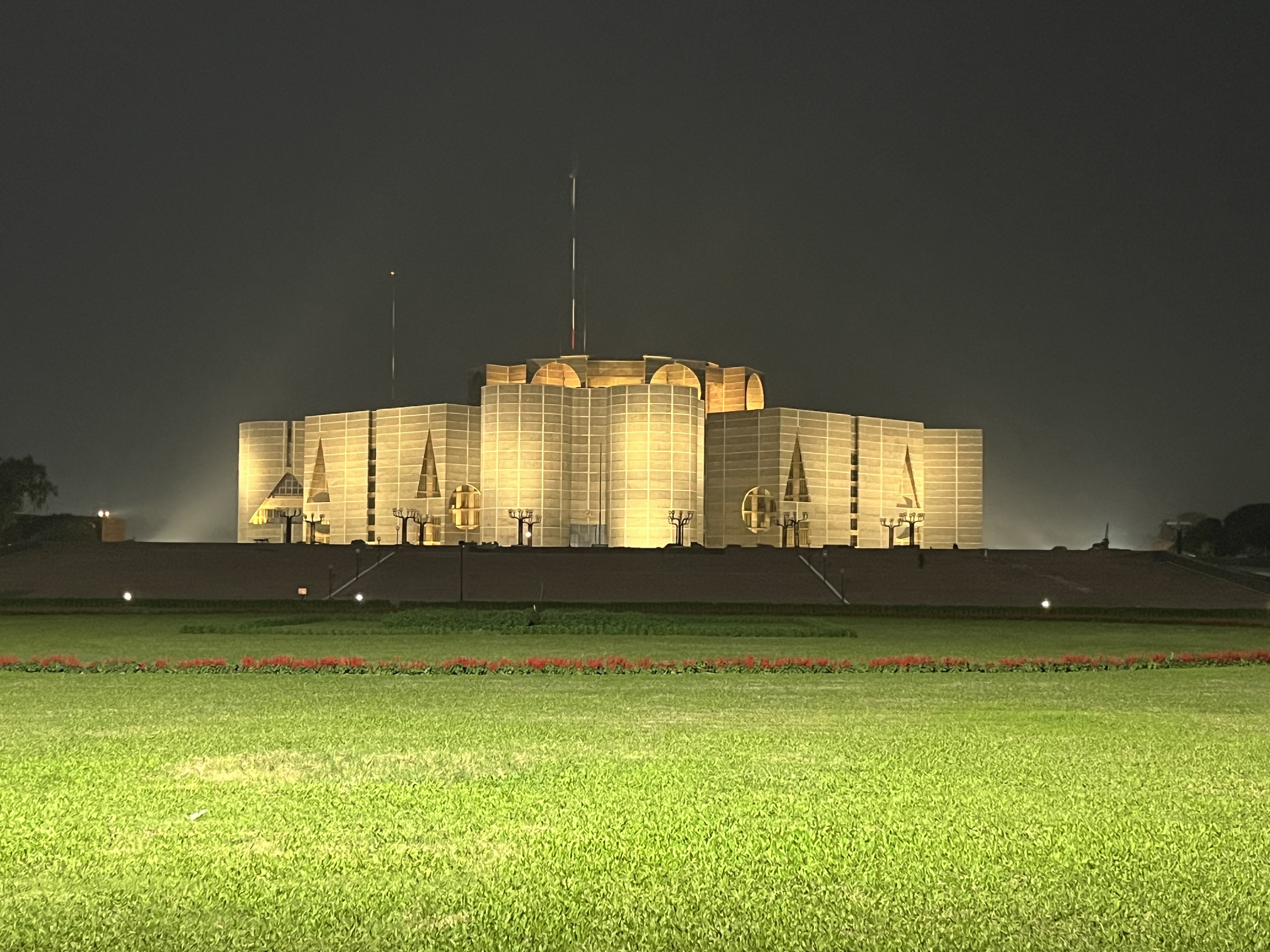
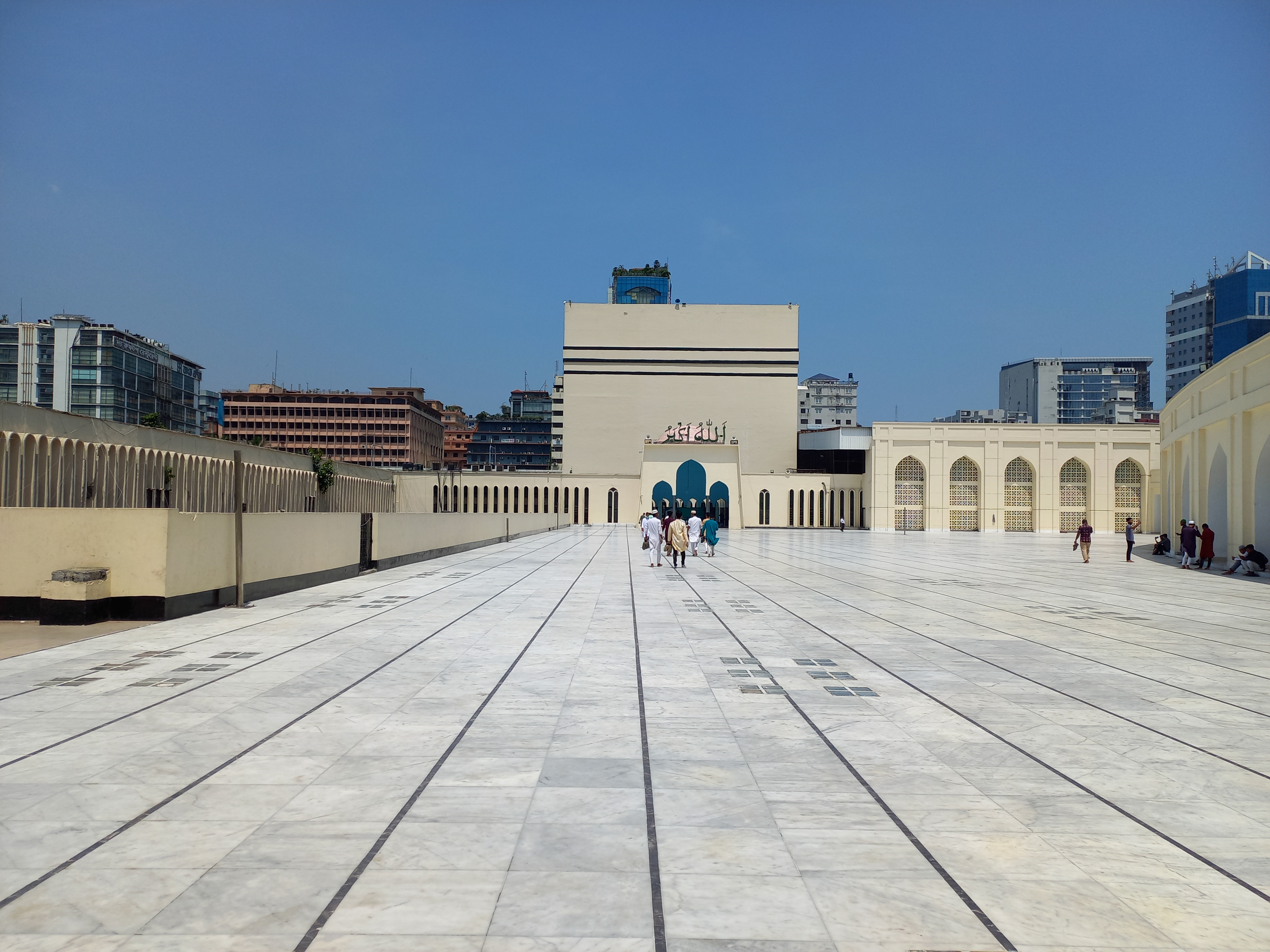
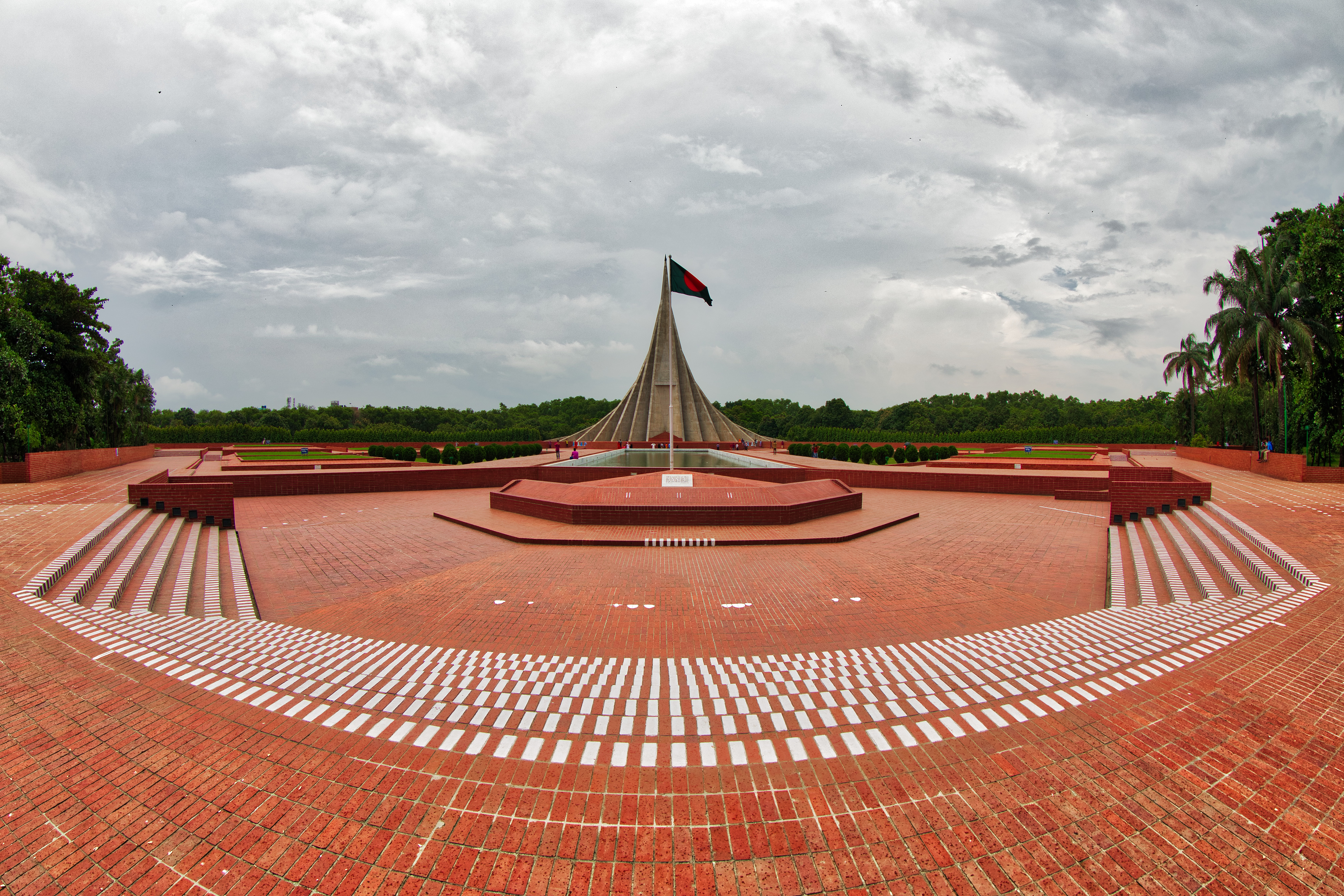
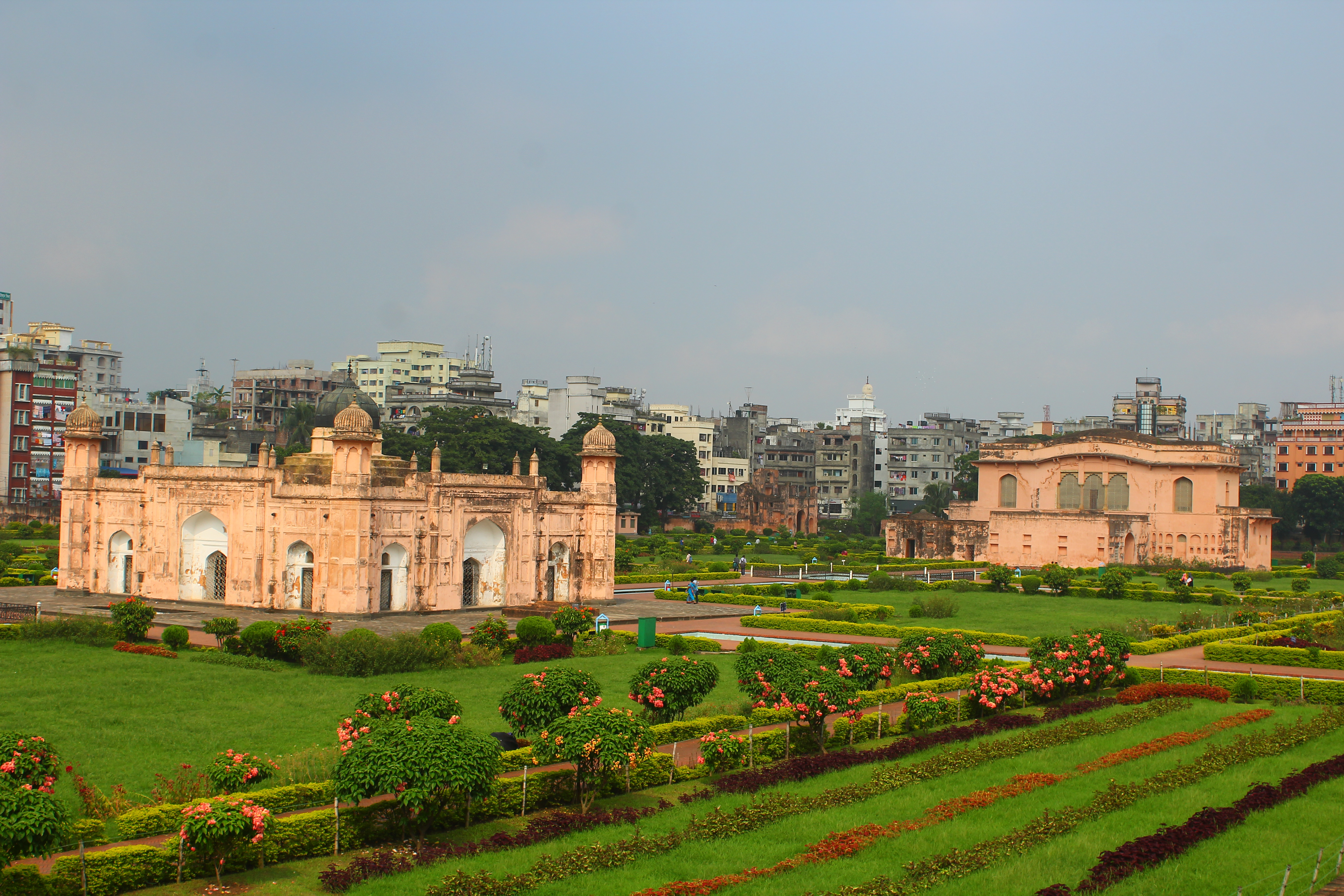
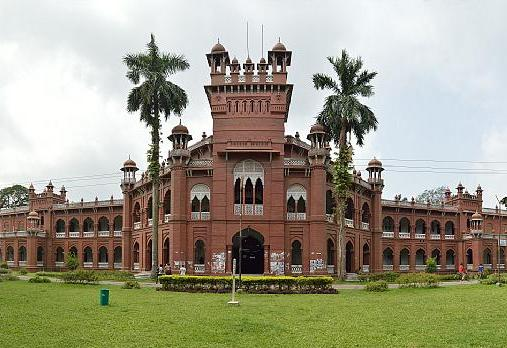
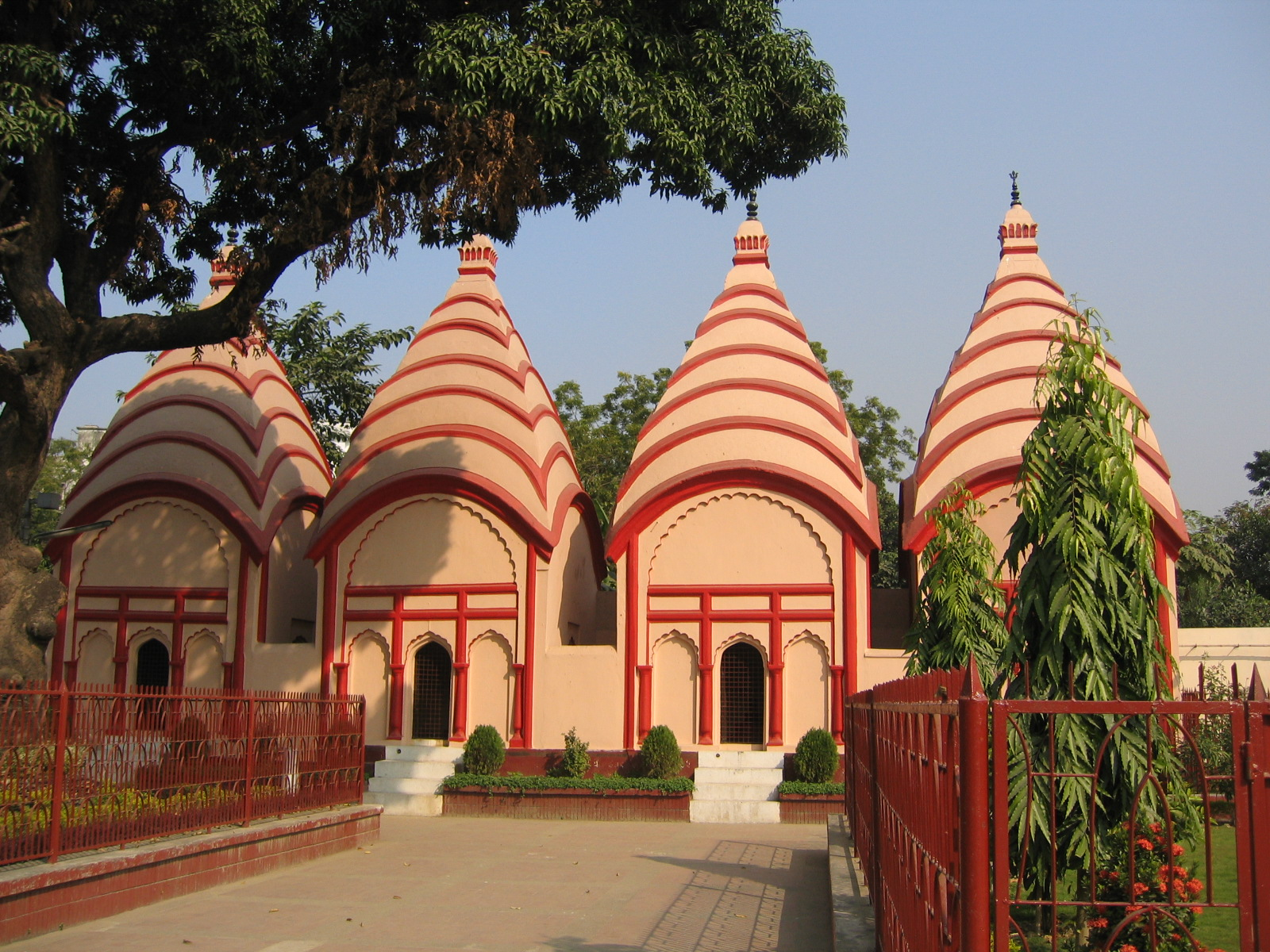
- Jatiya Sangsad Bhaban, Baitul Mukarram National Mosque, Lalbagh Fort, Curzon Hall, Dhakeshwari Temple, National Martyrs' Memorial

- Location of Dhaka District within Bangladesh
- Interactive map of Dhaka District
- Coordinates: 23.79°N 90.30°E
- Country: Bangladesh
- Division: Dhaka
- Headquarters: Dhaka

Government
  - Deputy Commissioner: Md Rezaul Karim
  - District Council Chairman: Md Mahbubur Rahman
  - Chief Executive Officer: Md Mamunur Rashid

Area
  - District of Bangladesh: 1,463.6 km^{2} (565.1 sq mi)

Population (2022)
  - District of Bangladesh: 14,734,701
  - Rank: 1st in Bangladesh
  - Density: 10,067/km^{2} (26,075/sq mi)
  - Urban: 11,237,217
  - Rural: 3,497,484
- Demonym(s): Dhakai, Dhakaiya

GDP (2015 US dollar)
  - Total: $50.1 billion (2023)
  - Per capita: $2,600 (2025)

GDP (PPP, 2025 international dollar)
  - Total: $150.2 billion (2025)
  - Per capita: $8,100 (2025)
- Postal code: 1000
- Area code: 02
- ISO 3166 code: BD-13
- HDI (2025): ▲0.741 high · 1st of 20
- Website: www.dhaka.gov.bd

Dhaka District (Bengali: ঢাকা জেলা, romanised: Ḍhākā jēlā) is a district in central Bangladesh, and is the densest district in the nation. It is a part of the Dhaka Division. Dhaka, the capital of Bangladesh, rests on the eastern banks of the Buriganga River which flows from the Turag to the southern part of the district. The former Dhaka city corporation occupied only about a fifth of the area of Dhaka district until 2011 where the municipal corporation was fractionated and rearranged in North and South corporations due to being the economic, political and cultural centre of the district and also the country. Dhaka District consists of the upazillas of Keraniganj, Nawabganj, Dohar, Savar and Dhamrai, alongside the city of Dhaka. Dhaka District is an administrative entity, and like many other cities, it does not cover the modern conurbation which is Greater Dhaka, which has spilled into neighbouring districts, nor does the conurbation cover the whole district, as there are rural areas within the district.

== Geography ==
Dhaka District shares borders with Gazipur and Tangail to the north, Munshiganj and Rajbari to the south, Narayanganj to the east and Manikganj to the west. The main rivers flowing through this district are Padma, Kaliganga, Dhaleshwari, Ichamati, Shitalakshya, Buriganga and numerous smaller rivers including Bangshi, Turag, Balu, Elamjani, Alam, Bherujkha, Ramkrishnadi, Elisamari, Tulsikhali. Major lakes (Bengali: বিল) include Belai, Saldaher, Labandaher, Churain, Damsharan and Kiranjir Beel. The annual average temperature of the district is maximum 41.1 °C, minimum 11.5 °C; the average annual rainfall 1931mm.

== History ==
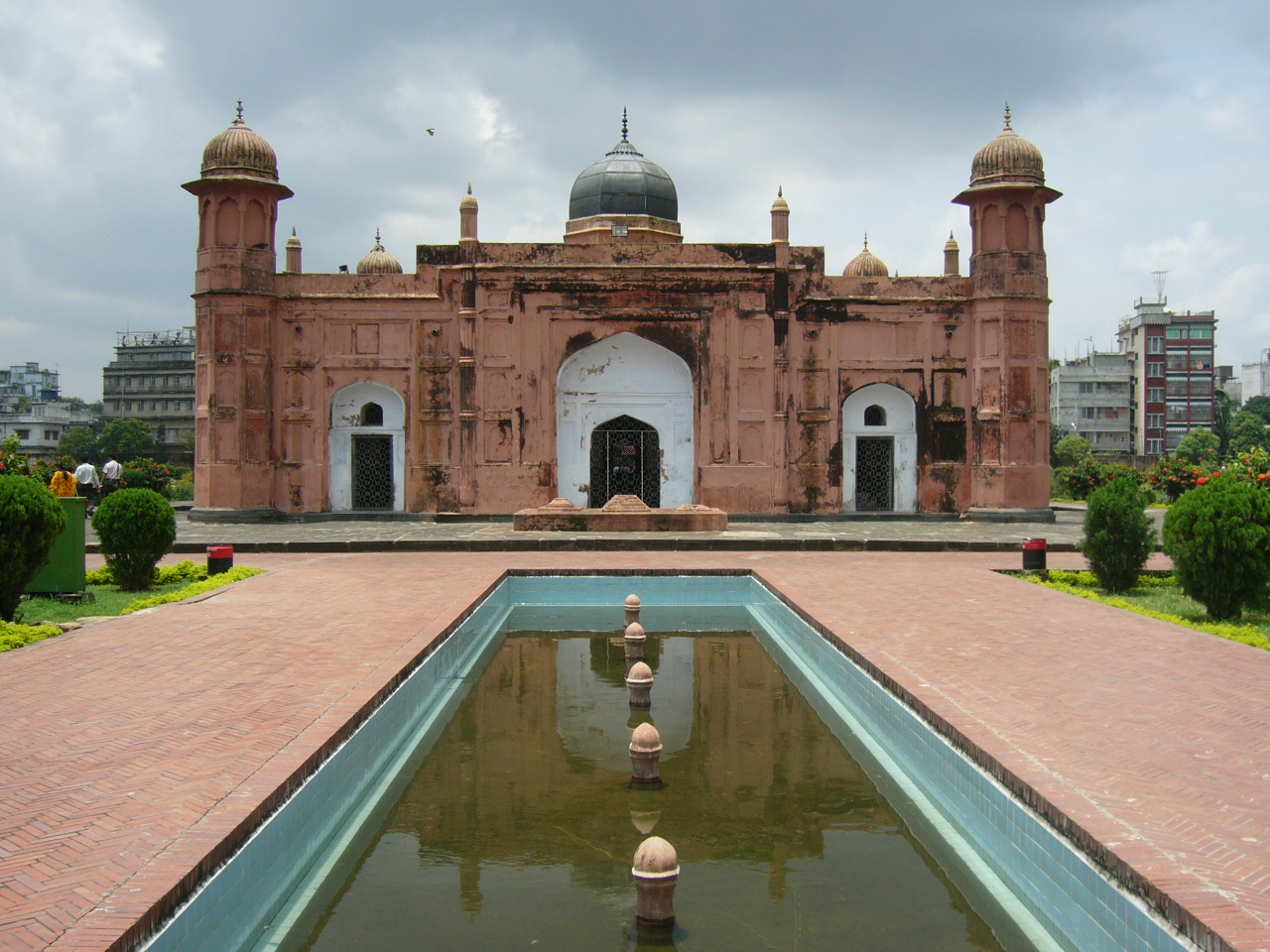
Lalbagh Fort was developed by Shaista Khan.

The administrative Dhaka District was first established in 1772, but the existence of urbanised settlements in the area that is now Dhaka city—dates from the 7th century. The present-day Savar was the capital of the Sanbagh Kingdom during the seventh and eighth centuries. The city area of Dhaka was ruled by the Buddhist kingdom of Kamarupa and the Pala Empire before passing to the control of the Hindu Sena dynasty in the 9th century. Many believe that the name of the city was derived after the establishment of the goddess Dhakeshwari's temple by Ballal Sena in the 12th century. Dhaka and its surrounding area were identified as Bengalla around that period. The town itself consisted of a few market centres like Lakshmi Bazar, Shankhari Bazar, Tanti Bazar, Patuatuli, Kumartuli, Bania Nagar and Goal Nagar. After the Sena dynasty, Dhaka was successively ruled by the Turkish and Afghan governors descending from the Delhi Sultanate before the arrival of the Mughals in 1608.

The development of townships and significant growth in population came as the city was proclaimed the capital of Bengal under Mughal rule in 1608. During Mughal rule the areas currently under Dhaka district were famous for their textile products—especially the Muslin. Mughal subahdar Islam Khan was the first administrator of the city. Khan named the town "Jahangir Nagar" (City of Jahangir) in honour of the Mughal emperor Jahangir, although this name was dropped soon after Jahangir's death. The main expansion of the city took place under the Mughal general Shaista Khan. The city then measured 19 by 13 kilometres (11.8 by 8.1 mi), with a population of nearly a million people. The city passed to the control of the British East India Company in 1757 after the Battle of Plassey and eventually to the Crown, British Empire, in 1765 at the Battle of Buxar. The city's population shrank dramatically during this period as the prominence of Kolkata rose, but substantive development and modernisation eventually followed. A modern civic water supply system was introduced in 1874 and an electricity supply was launched in 1878. The Dhaka Cantonment was established near the city, serving as a base for British Indian military personnel.

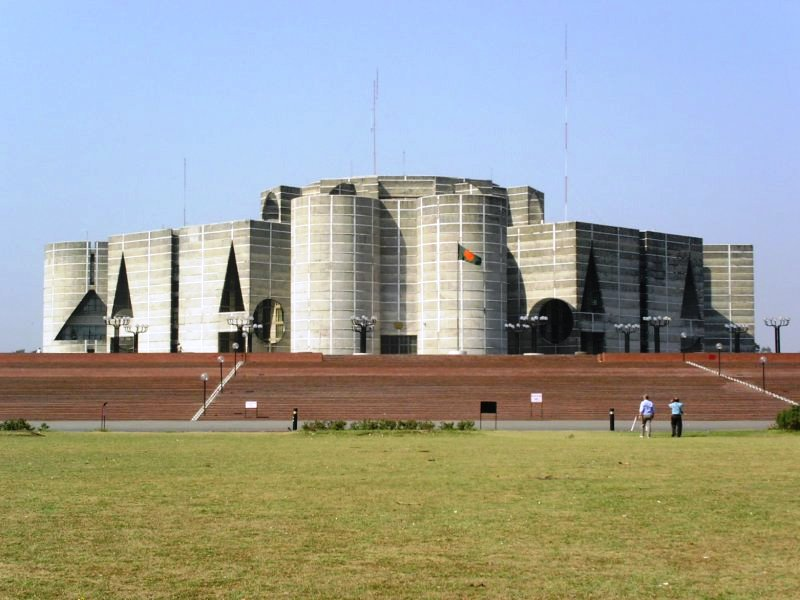
Jatiyo Sangshad Bhaban houses the national parliament.

During the abortive Partition of Bengal in 1905, Dhaka was declared to be the capital of the newly established state of Eastern Bengal and Assam, but Bengal was reunited in 1911. The rural areas under the present Dhaka district, especially Dohar Upazila were used for the production of indigo.

Following the partition of Bengal in (1947) appending the partition of British India in 1947, Dhaka became the capital of East Bengal as a part of the new Muslim state of Pakistan, while the western part of Bengal with a majority Hindu population had become a part of the new and independent India, designated as West Bengal with Calcutta as state capital. Calcutta witnessed communal violence that left thousands of people dead. A large proportion of the city's Hindu population departed for India, while the city received hundreds of thousands of Muslim immigrants from Calcutta, India. The city's population rose dramatically in a very short period of time, which created severe shortages and infrastructural problems. As the centre of regional politics, Dhaka saw an increasing number of political strikes and incidents of violence. The adoption of Urdu as the sole official language of Pakistan led to protest marches involving large crowds. Known as the language movement of 1952, the protests resulted in police firing which killed students who were demonstrating peacefully. Throughout the 1950s and '60s, Dhaka remained a hotbed of political activity, and the demands for autonomy for the Bengali population gradually gained momentum.

The 1970 Bhola cyclone devastated much of the region, killing an estimated 500,000 people. More than half the city of Dhaka was flooded and millions of people were marooned. With public anger growing against ethnic discrimination and poor cyclone relief efforts from the central government, Bengali politician Sheikh Mujibur Rahman held a nationalist rally on 7 March 1971 at the Race Course Ground. An estimated one million people attended the gathering, leading to Ziaur Rahman's 26 March declaration of Bangladesh's independence. In response, the Pakistan Army launched Operation Searchlight, which led to the arrests, torture and killing of hundreds of thousands of people, mainly Hindus and Bengali intellectuals.

During the Bangladesh Liberation War the Pakistan army arrested and killed fourteen Muktijoddhas from Dhamrai Bazar. A mass grave created during the war still exists in the western side of Kalampur Bazar. The Pak army also burnt down many houses in Konakhola, Basta, Brahmankirtha, Goalkhali and Khagail Kholamora villages of Keraniganj Upazila.

The fall of Dhaka city to the allied forces led by Jagjit Singh Aurora on 16 December marked the surrender of the Pakistani army. The post-independence period has seen a rapid and massive growth of the city population, attracting migrant workers from rural areas across Bangladesh. A real estate boom followed with urban sprawl and the development of new settlements such as Gulshan, Banani and Motijheel.

On 1 July 2026, Purbachal was incorporated into Dhaka District for administrative convenience. It previously straddled between Rupganj Upazila of Narayanganj District and Kaliganj Upazila of Gazipur District.

== Administration ==
- Administrator of Zila Parishad: Mr. Md Mahbubur Rahman
- Deputy Commissioner (DC): Md. Mominur Rahman

== Subdivisions ==
Dhaka District upazila geocode map

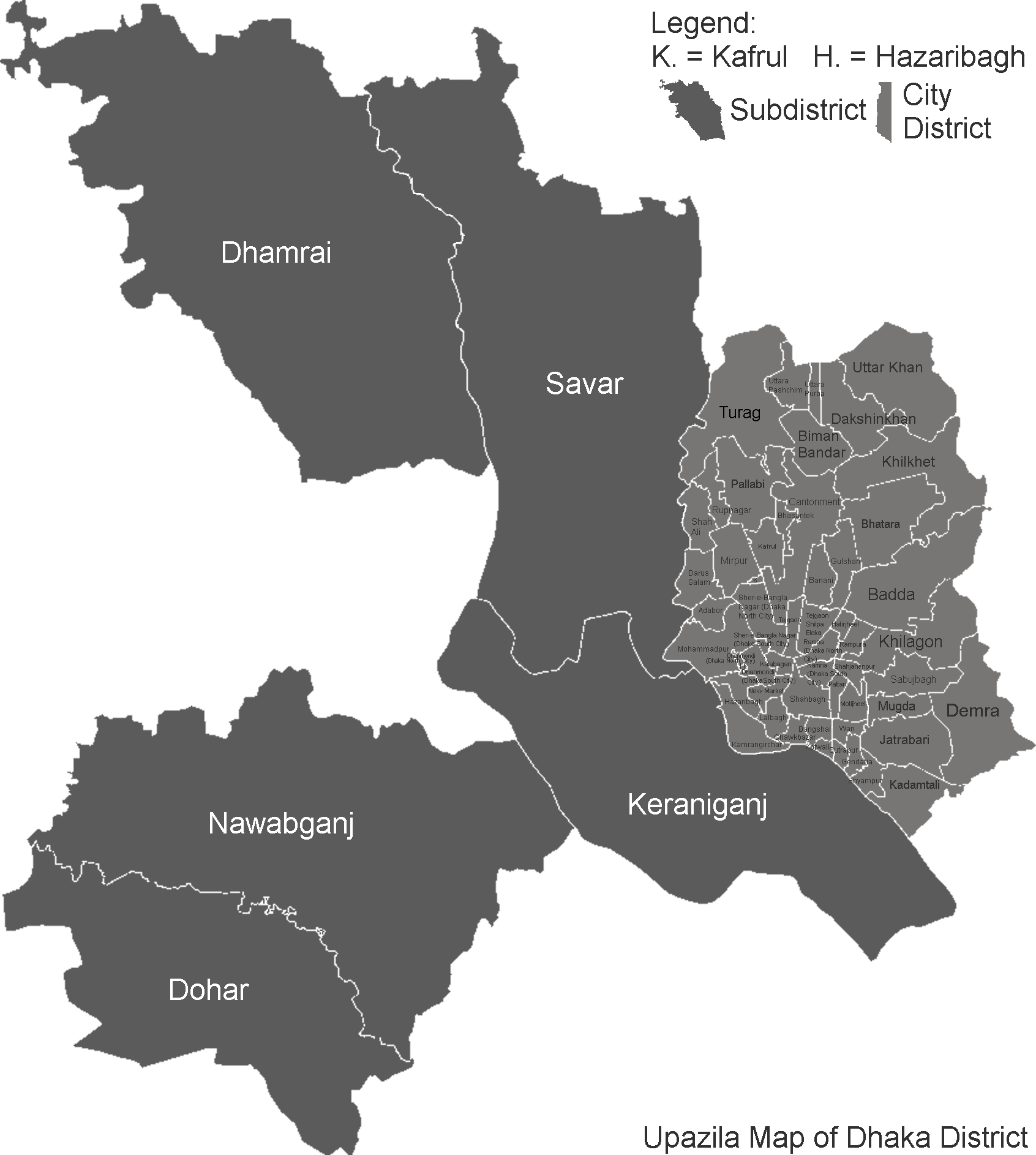
Subdistrict and City District map of Dhaka

The district does not cover all parts of Greater Dhaka, and Greater Dhaka does not include all parts of the district, which includes rural areas. The district consists of 57 thanas (50 in city corporations, 7 in upazilas), 5 upazilas, 86 unions, 974 mauzas, 1999 villages, 2 City Corporations, 129 City Wards, 855 City Mahallas, 3 paurashavas, 27 wards and 133 mahallas.

The five upazilas in Dhaka district are:

- Dhamrai Upazila, suburban and rural
- Dohar Upazila, suburban and rural
- Keraniganj Upazila, suburban
- Nawabganj Upazila, suburban and rural
- Savar Upazila, suburban

The municipal area of Dhaka City is under the jurisdiction of the Dhaka North City Corporation and Dhaka South City Corporation; for administrative purposes, the municipal area is divided into 92 wards. Tejgaon Development Circle is merged with the two city corporations.

== Demographics ==
According to the 2022 Census of Bangladesh, Dhaka District had 4,035,241 households and a population of 14,734,701 with an average 3.62 people per household. Among the population, 2,231,856 (15.15%) inhabitants were under 10 years of age. The population density was 10,067 people per km^{2}. Dhaka District had a literacy rate (age 7 and over) of 84.88%, compared to the national average of 74.80%, and a sex ratio of 865 females per 1000 males. Approximately 76.26% of the population lived in urban areas. The ethnic population was 27,137.

Historical population
Year	Pop.	±% p.a.
1981	4,023,838	—
1991	5,839,642	+3.79%
2001	8,511,228	+3.84%
2011	12,043,977	+3.53%
2022	14,734,701	+1.85%

=== Religion ===
Religions in Dhaka District (2022)
Religion	Percent
Islam	94.88%
Hinduism	4.56%
Christianity	0.42%
Others	0.13%

Religion in present-day Dhaka District
Religion	1941 (Note: 1941 census figures are for Dhaka City, Tezgaon, Keraniganj, Nawabganj, Dohar, Dhamrai, Sabhar thanas of Dhaka district, which roughly corresponds to the present district.)		1981		1991		2001		2011		2022	
Religion	Pop.	%	Pop.	%	Pop.	%	Pop.	%	Pop.	%	Pop.	%
Islam	565,552	56.67%	3,672,579	91.27%	5,414,536	92.72%	8,020,372	94.23%	11,400,096	94.65%	13,980,953	94.88%
Hinduism	422,284	42.32%	316,612	7.87%	379,397	6.50%	441,213	5.18%	566,368	4.70%	672,269	4.56%
Christianity	7,073	0.71%	26,063	0.65%	36,354	0.62%	41,395	0.49%	62,064	0.52%	63,402	0.43%
Others (Note: Including Jainism, Buddhism, Zoroastrianism, Judaism, Ad-Dharmis, or not stated)	2,997	0.30%	8,584	0.21%	9,355	0.16%	8,248	0.10%	15,449	0.13%	18,073	0.13%
Total Population	997,906	100%	4,023,838	100%	5,839,642	100%	8,511,228	100%	12,043,977	100%	14,734,701	100%

In 2011, Islam was the largest religion in the Dhaka district with 94.65% of the population. Hinduism was the second-largest religion with 4.70% of the population. 0.52% of the population were Christians, while Buddhists were only 0.11% of the population. Although all communities are predominantly urban, a greater percentage of Hindus live in rural areas than in other communities. The district of Dhaka has more than 12 000 mosques, 3012 Hindu mandirs, 530 churches, 174 Buddhist temples, three pagodas and a synagogue. For a long time, Islam has been the majority religion in Dhaka, with only 1300 mosques, but more mosques were recently built, and the district is now called the City of Mosques.

== Economy ==
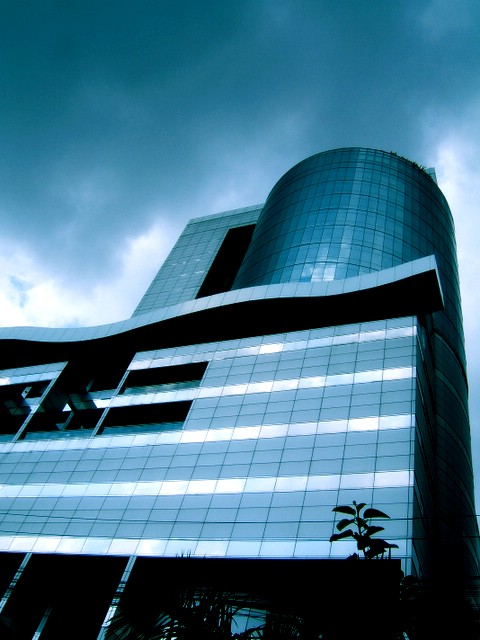
Bashundhara City Shopping Complex

Dhaka is the commercial heart of Bangladesh. The city has a large middle class population, increasing the market for modern consumer and luxury goods. Many skilled workers are employed in the businesses and industries located in the Dhaka metropolitan area. The city has historically attracted many migrant workers. Hawkers, peddlers, small shops, rickshaws transport, roadside vendors and stalls employ a large segment of the population—rickshaw-drivers alone number as many as 400,000. Half the workforce is employed in household and unorganised labour, while about 800,000 work in the textile industry. Even so, unemployment remains high at 23%. According to CityMayors Statistics, Dhaka's GDP registered at $52 billion in 2005 with an annual growth rate of 6.1%. Its estimated GDP in the year 2020 is $126 billion. The annual per capita income of Dhaka is estimated at $550, although a large segment of the population lives below the poverty line, with many surviving on less than $3 a day.

The main business districts of the city include Motijheel, Panthapath and Gulshan. Bashundhara City is a recently developed economic area that houses many high-tech industries and corporations and a shopping mall that is one of the largest in Southeast Asia, frequented daily by more than 25,000 people. The Export Processing Zone in Dhaka was set up to encourage the export of garments, textiles and other goods. The EPZ is home to 80 factories, which employ mostly women. The Dhaka Stock Exchange is based in the city, as are most of the large companies and banks of Bangladesh, including the Bangladesh Bank, HSBC, Citibank and the Grameen Bank. Urban developments have sparked a widespread construction boom, causing new high-rise buildings and skyscrapers to change the city landscape. Growth has been especially strong in the finance, banking, manufacturing, telecommunications and services sectors, while tourism, hotels and restaurants continue as important elements of the Dhaka economy.

== See also ==
- Districts of Bangladesh

== Extyernal links ==
- Media related to Dhaka District at Wikimedia Commons
