= Turag River =

River in Bangladesh

Turag River Kohor River
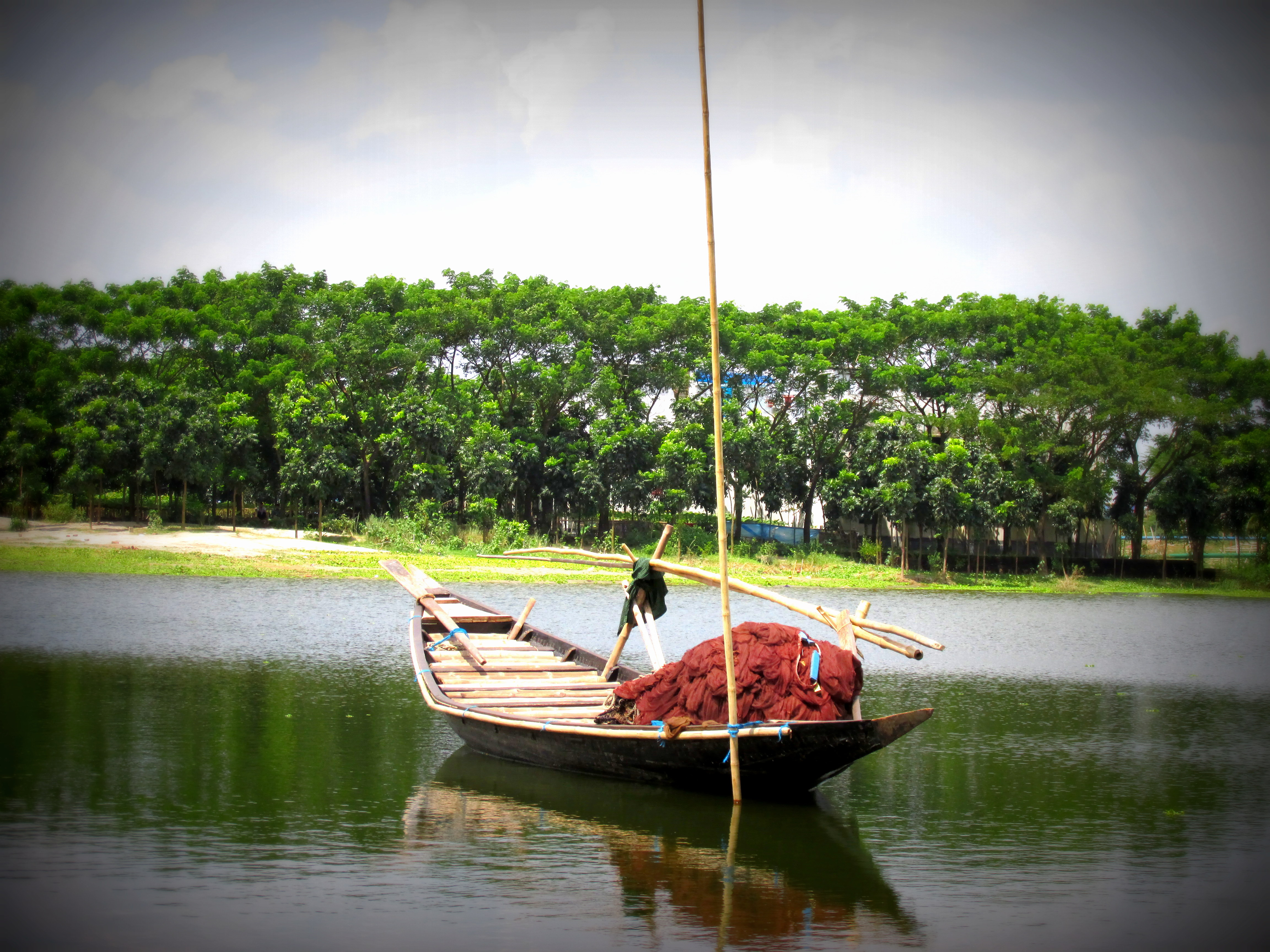
- The Turag River as it is seen from Mirpur
- Native name: তুরাগ নদ (Bengali)

Location
- Country: Bangladesh
- Region: Dhaka Division
- District: Dhaka, Gazipur

Physical characteristics
- Source: Bangshi River
  - coordinates: 24.4739°N 90.0743°E
- Mouth: Buriganga River
  - coordinates: 23.7520°N 90.3291°E

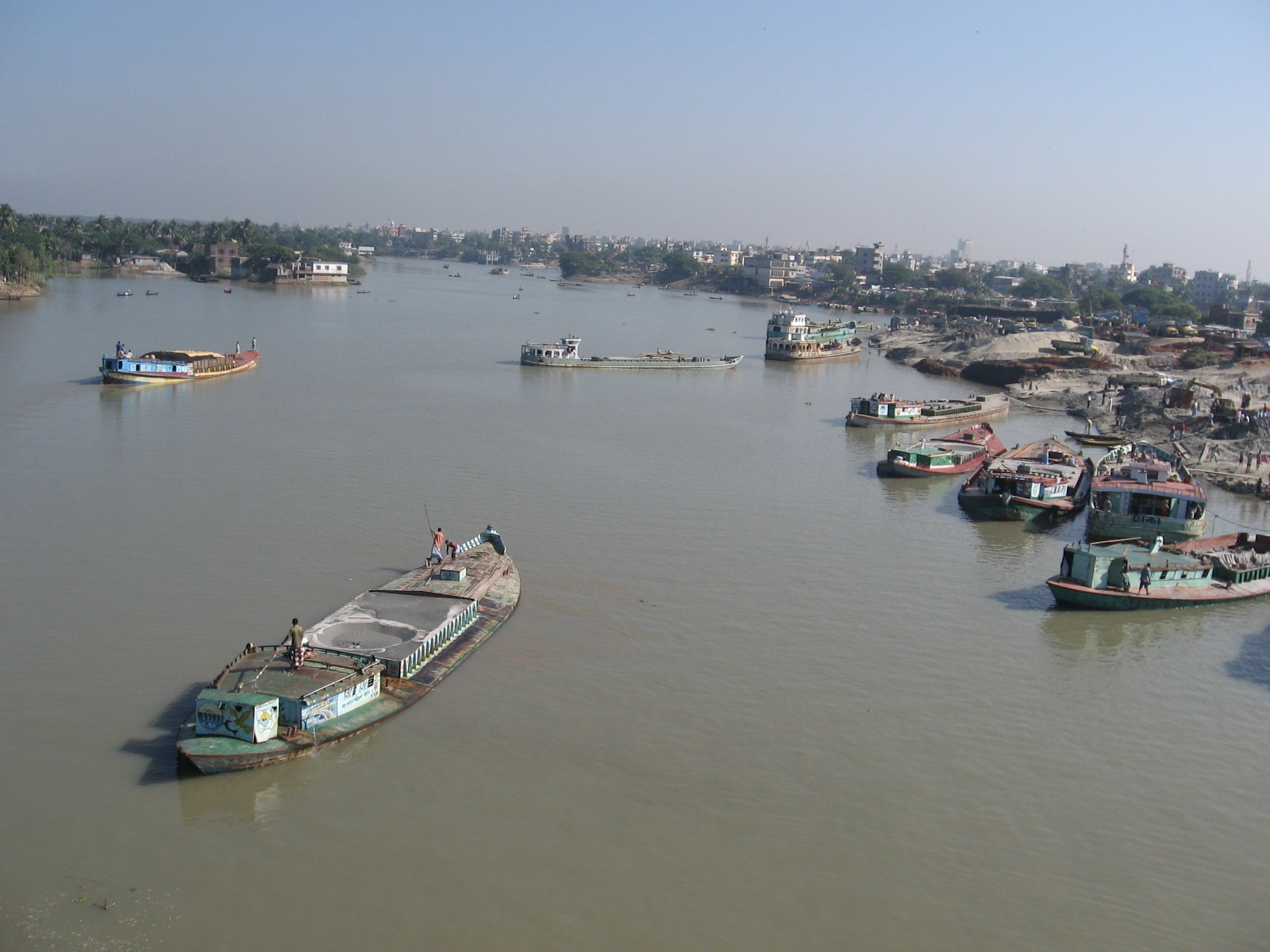
The river at Aminbazar-Gabtoli, Dhaka

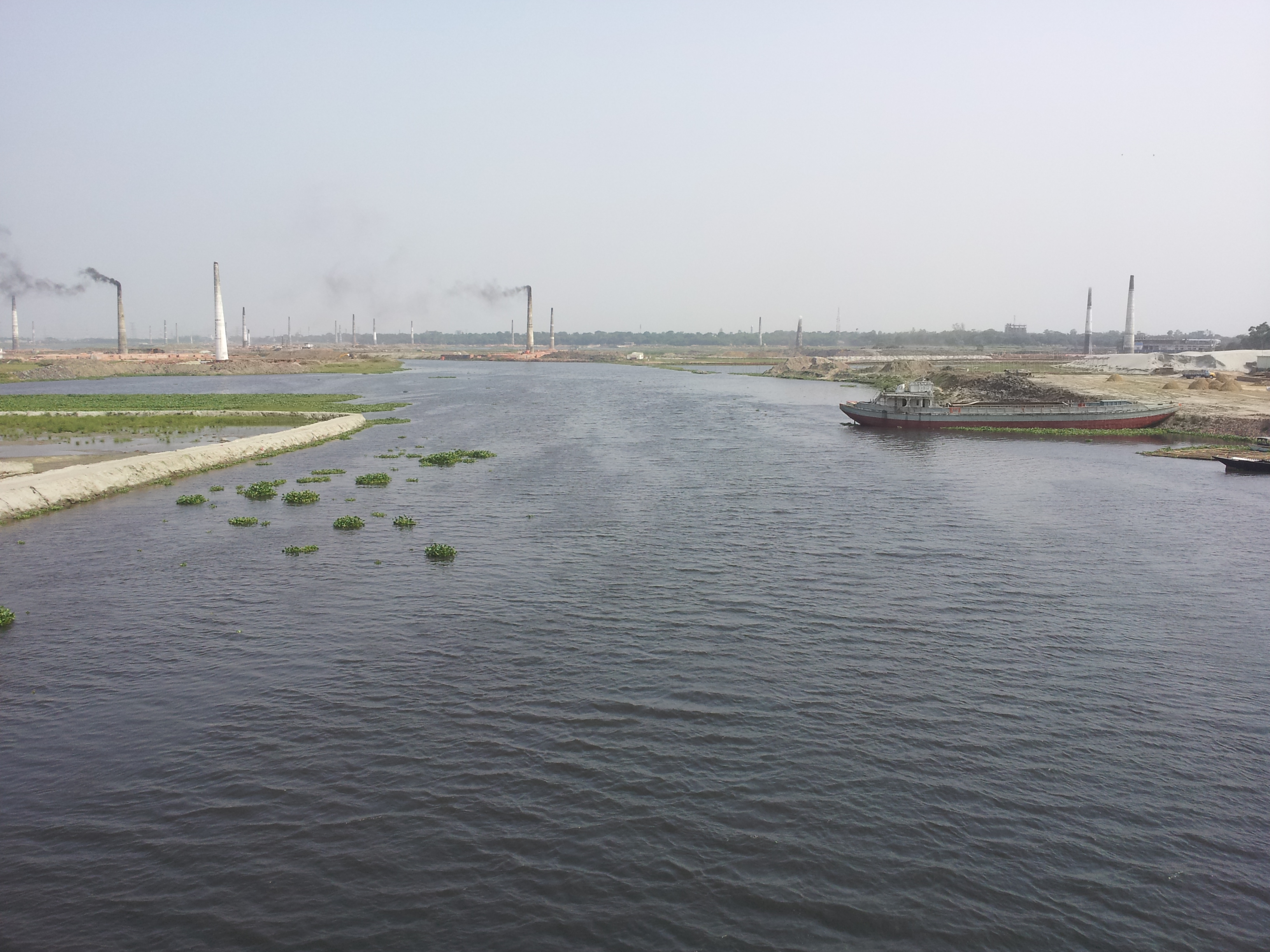
The river at Ashulia

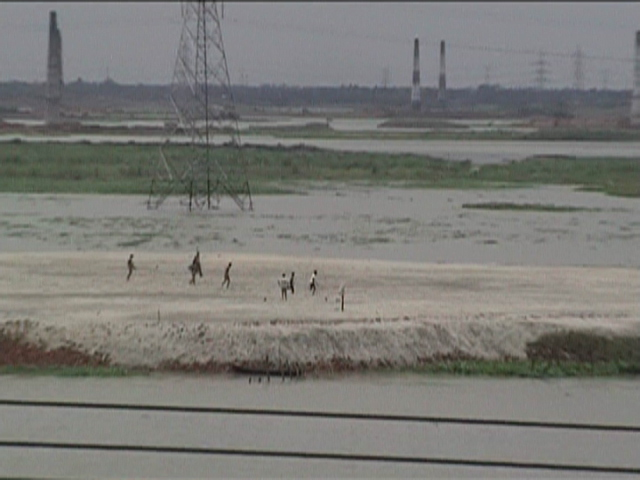
An industrialized and obstructed section of the river

The Turag River (Bengali: তুরাগ নদ; [t̪uraɡ nɔd̪]) is the upper tributary of the Buriganga, a major river in Bangladesh. The Turag originates from the Bangshi River, (which is an important tributary of the Dhaleshwari River) flows through Gazipur and joins the Buriganga at Mirpur in Dhaka District. It is navigable by boat all year round.

The Turag suffers from infilling along its banks, which restricts its flow. Sedimentation that reduces the flow may have begun as early as the 1950 Assam–Tibet earthquake. It also suffers from acute water pollution. While attempts have been made to marginally widen the river, the majority of industry has made little effort to follow environmental laws and the water has become visibly discolored and polluted.

== History ==
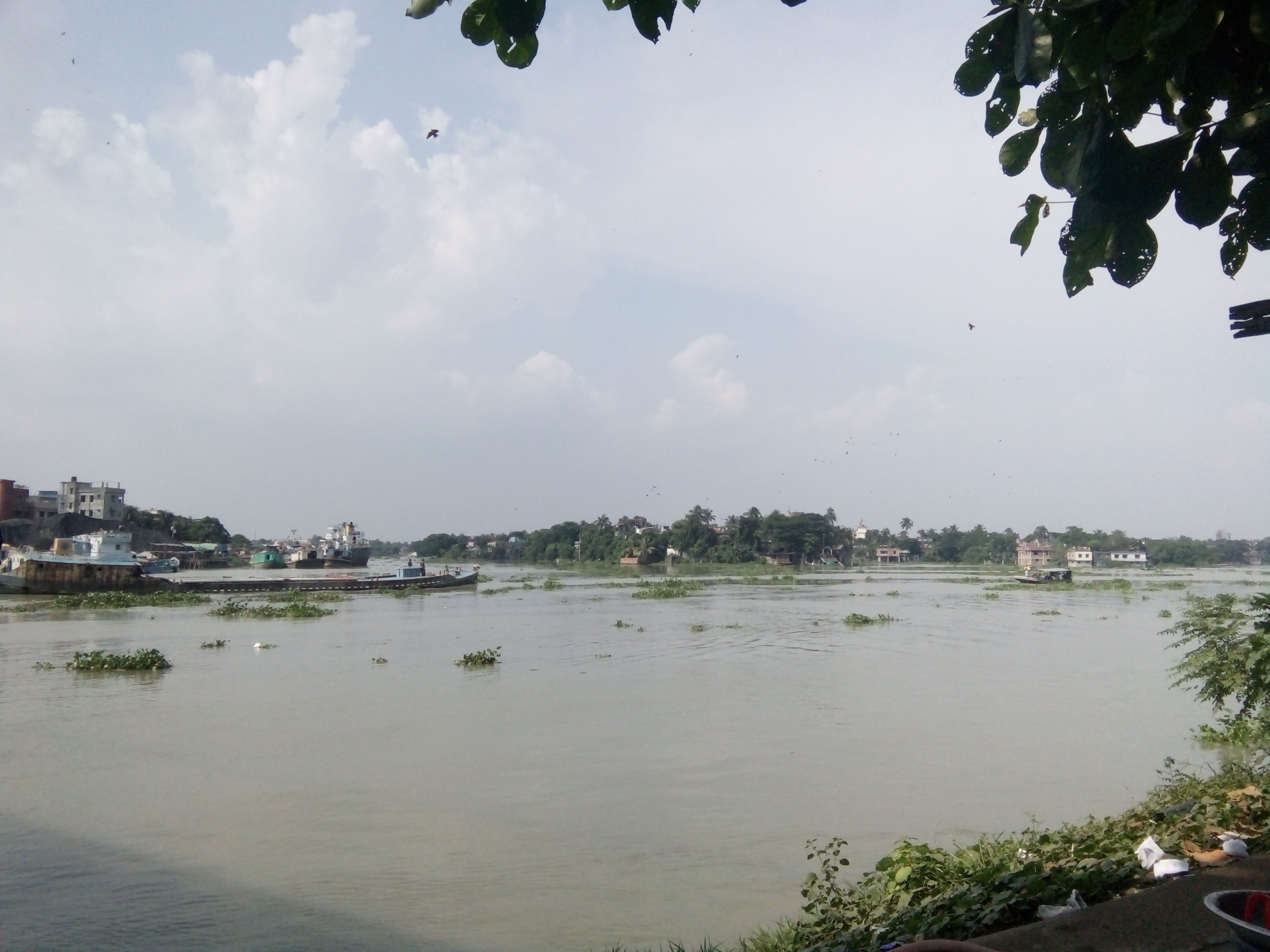
The river at Aminbazar-Gabtoli Bridge, Dhaka

Historically, this river used to be called the "Kohor river" (Bengali: কহর দরিয়া).

== Religious significance ==
Tabligh Jam'at, a widespread Islamic movement originating in South Asia, initially took hold in Dhaka in the 1950s as Maulana Abdul Aziz and other leaders set up the regional headquarters at the Kakrail Mosque near Ramna Park. An initiative of the movement is an emphasis on the six uṣūl or basic principles, two of which include ilm, the pursuit of knowledge, and dhikr or zikr, a method of prayer involving repetitive invocation of hadith and Qur'an passages. To this end, the movement places importance on ijtema or assembly, where members gather to practice and participate in dhikr, hear religious sermons and discuss their activities.

The largest of these, the Bishwa Ijtema, is situated by the Turag River in Tongi and attracts estimates of between two and four million Muslims annually as well as representatives from over 60 countries, making it the second biggest Islamic congregation after the Hajj.

== See also ==
- Rivers in Dhaka
- Water pollution in Bangladesh
