= Climate adaptation and public health in Nigeria =

Climate change consist of long term changes in temperature, weather patterns that mostly related to human activities, especially the combustion of fossil fuels. This phenomenon is a risk multiplier affecting every sector, geographies and adding to already pre-existing developmental problems. Specifically, climate change poses special threat to human health and well-being by impacting to the weather condition, ecosystem and societal system. Climate change accelerates the impact of extreme events and also alter the environmental condition indirectly leading to easy transmission of infectious disease, influencing population movement, eroding the foundation of livelihood, wellbeing and physical and mental health.

In Nigeria climate change has not only aggravated existing health problems, but it also jeopardises health system, food and water security, infrastructure and social protection framework. The health consequences of climate change on both mortality and healthy live lost and the degradation of healthcare facilities, placed an additional burden on the already overstretched infrastructure, medical and human resources.

Nigeria climate health V&A 2024 assessment report shows the relationship between climate change and health outcome risk factors like; Vector borne Diseases such as malaria and dengue fever, respiratory disease such as asthma and zoonoses, mental health and heat related diseases (cerebrospinal meningitis, skin cancer), water borne diseases (cholera, typhoid), and food borne disease.

== Climate change vulnerability and Adaptation (V&A) in Nigeria Public Health sector ==
So far Nigeria health system is overburden and overstretched due to climate change conditions, indirectly leading to increased cases of climate -sensitive health risk diseases which as a result of extreme weather events e.g. heatwaves, rising sea level, drought and flood. Nigeria is categorized to be amongst the countries that are acutely vulnerable to climate change with low readiness to contain the problem, which is due to combination of different factors like geographical, social and political factors, Nigeria was ranked 154 out 181 countries in the 2021 Notre Dame Global Adaptation Initiatives(ND-GAINS)index, despite positive trend between 2005 and 2013.

=== Current and Proposed Climate -Health Adaptation Strategies in Nigeria ===
The Nigerian Climate Change and Health Vulnerability and Adaptation(V&A) Assessment 2024 reports identifies some adaptation strategies aimed at strengthening the country's health system resilience against climate related risk. The strategies were designed based on WHO's ten building blocks for climate-resilience health system, which consist of current initiatives and future interventions.

=== Leadership and Governance ===
Current effort include establishment of climate and health unit within the Federal Ministry of Health (FMoH) and some state ministries of health. However, these units are insufficiently resourced and coordination amongst health and non-health sector is weak. To address these challenges the findings of the Vulnerability &Adaptability(V&A) assessments should be disseminated amongst stakeholders and policymakers in the health sector, a fully costed Health National Adaptability Plan should be developed, strengthening collaboration and accountability on climate related issues

=== Climate and Health Financing ===
Although Nigeria has an established health financing mechanism, there is currently no dedicated budget for climate and health interventions. The report therefore suggests defining a financing mechanism for countering climate-related emergencies and integrating climate-health priorities into national and sub-national budgetary allocations. Access to global climate-health financing mechanisms is also recommended to ensure sustainable funding for adaptation programmes.

=== Health Workforce Development ===
The report shows the current health workforce in Nigeria lacks adequate experience and expertise in handling climate-sensitive health risk. The current health sector workforce are often unprepared to face emerging challenges such as heat related illness, climate-induced disease outbreaks, and disaster response. Consequently, the report suggest a national capacity building programmes, awareness campaign and integration of climate-health competencies into medical education syllabus

=== Vulnerability Assessment and Health Information system ===
A significant milestone is the completion of Nigeria's first Climate and Health Vulnerability and Adaptation Assessment which provides a firsthand information on climate-health risks and vulnerabilities. Building on this achievement, the report proposed institutionalizing periodic vulnerability assessment and integrating climate data into health information system. Furthermore, health system should be linked with climate and meteorological early warning systems which will facilitate in early monitoring and response of climate -sensitive diseases

=== Integrated Risk Monitoring and Early Warning System ===
Currently disease surveillance and meteorological system are operating largely in isolation. The report suggest integration of these system at federal, state and local government levels, in order to create climate-informed early warnings which will improve outbreaks prediction, emergency preparedness

=== Health and Climate Research ===
Research on the climate-health relationship in Nigeria is very rare, thereby limiting information for policymakers and practitioners. The Nigeria Climate and Health Vulnerability and Adaptability assessment proposed investing in climate-health research, establishing a network of climate-health researchers, and supporting studies on priority issues like vector-borne diseases, food insecurity, and heat-related illness.

=== Climate-Resilience Infrastructure and Technology ===
Many health facilities in Nigeria are designed not to withstand climate extremes such as flood, heatwaves, and storms. Supply chain for drugs and medical commodities distribution are usually disrupted by extreme weather conditions. The report recommends assessing the climate resilience of health infrastructures and supply chain and likewise improve the capacities of laboratories and storage facilities

=== Climate-Informed Health Programmes ===
Currently existing health intervention targeting malaria, tuberculosis, cholera, maternal and child health currently lack climate consideration .consequently, the report recommends inclusion of climate information into the designed and implementation of the this interventions

=== Management of Environmental Determinant of Health ===
Environmental factors such as quality water supply, waste management and air pollution are major determinant of climate-sensitive health factors. So improving these factors and strengthening environmental public health surveillance will reduce the burden and cases of water borne disease, respiratory diseases that may be caused as a result of air pollution.

=== Emergency Preparedness and Management ===
Emergency preparedness are inadequate especially at local government level, where contingency plans for climate disasters are limited or absent. The report therefore recommends developing a climate-informed emergency response plans, improve health service contingency arrangement

=== Cross-cutting Adaptation Priorities ===
The rep[ort emphasize that adaptation in health sector should be multisectorial, evidence-based, equity-focused. Priorities should be given to most vulnerable set of people in the societies such as children, women, the elderly, people with disabilities and climate-sensitive regions.
