= Louhajang River =

Coordinates: 24°13′N 90°02′E

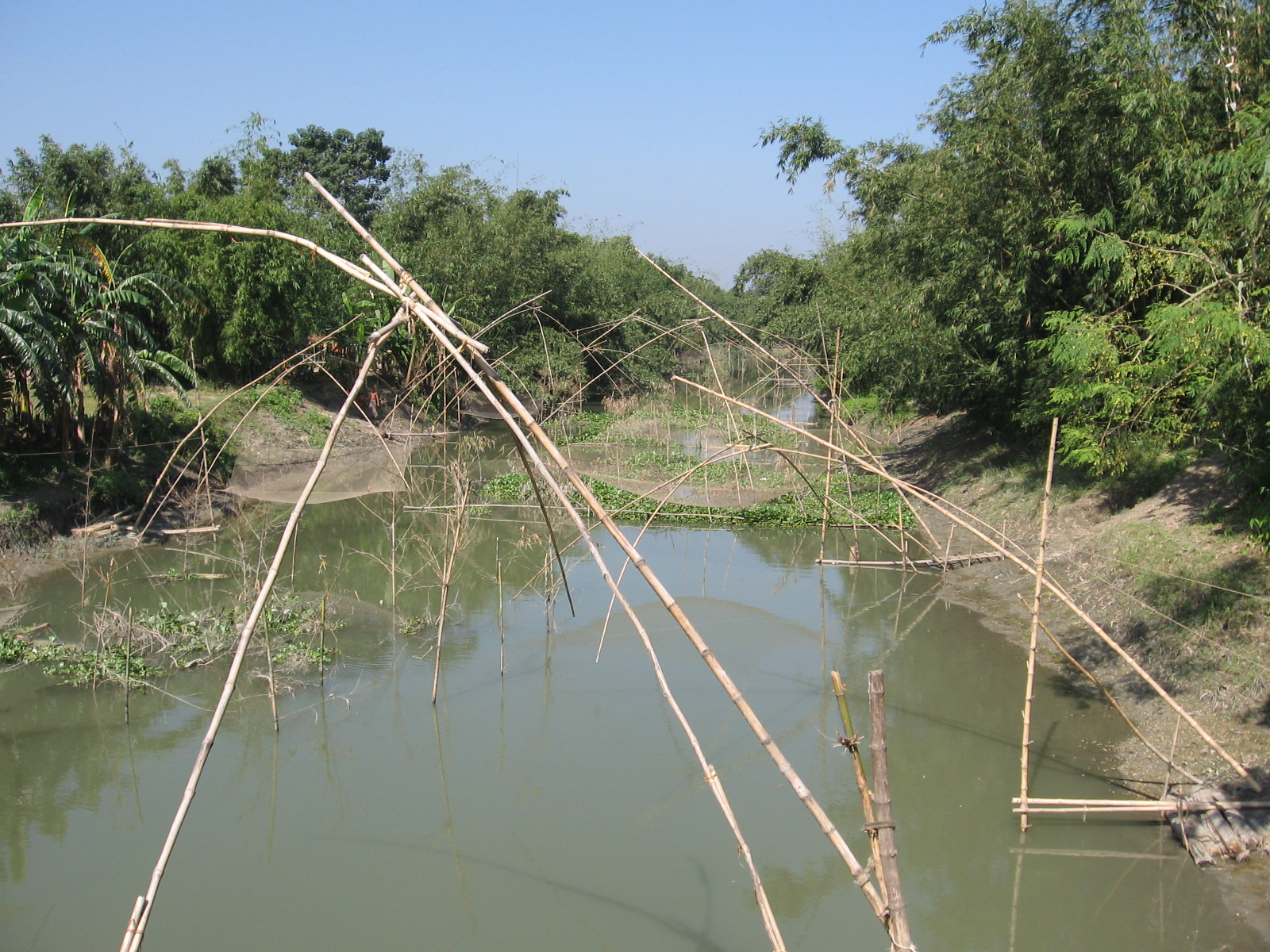
- Louhajang River in Tangail District

Location
- Country: Bangladesh
- Division: Dhaka
- District: Tangail

Physical characteristics
- Source: Jamuna River
  - location: Gabsa Ain, Tangail
- Mouth: Dhaleshwari River
- Discharge
  - location: Bangshi River

Louhajang River (Bengali: লৌহজং নদী, romanized: lauhajaṁ nadī [lowɦɔdʒɔŋ nɔdi]) is located in central Bangladesh. It branches off from the Jamuna near Gabsain at Bhuapur, Tangail District. Thereafter it bifurcates before the two parts meet up again. It flows past Tangail city, Karotia and Jamurki before joining the Bangshi. The Louhajang is linked with the Dhaleshwari.

The average depth of the Louhajang is 1 metre (3 ft) and maximum depth is 3 metres (9 ft).

Encroachment on the river's banks has been a persistent problem for decades, with not just banana orchards and vegetable gardens, but also illegally constructed concrete structures having been built in many areas on both banks of the river.
