= Shitalakshya River =

Coordinates: 23°34′14″N 90°32′02″E

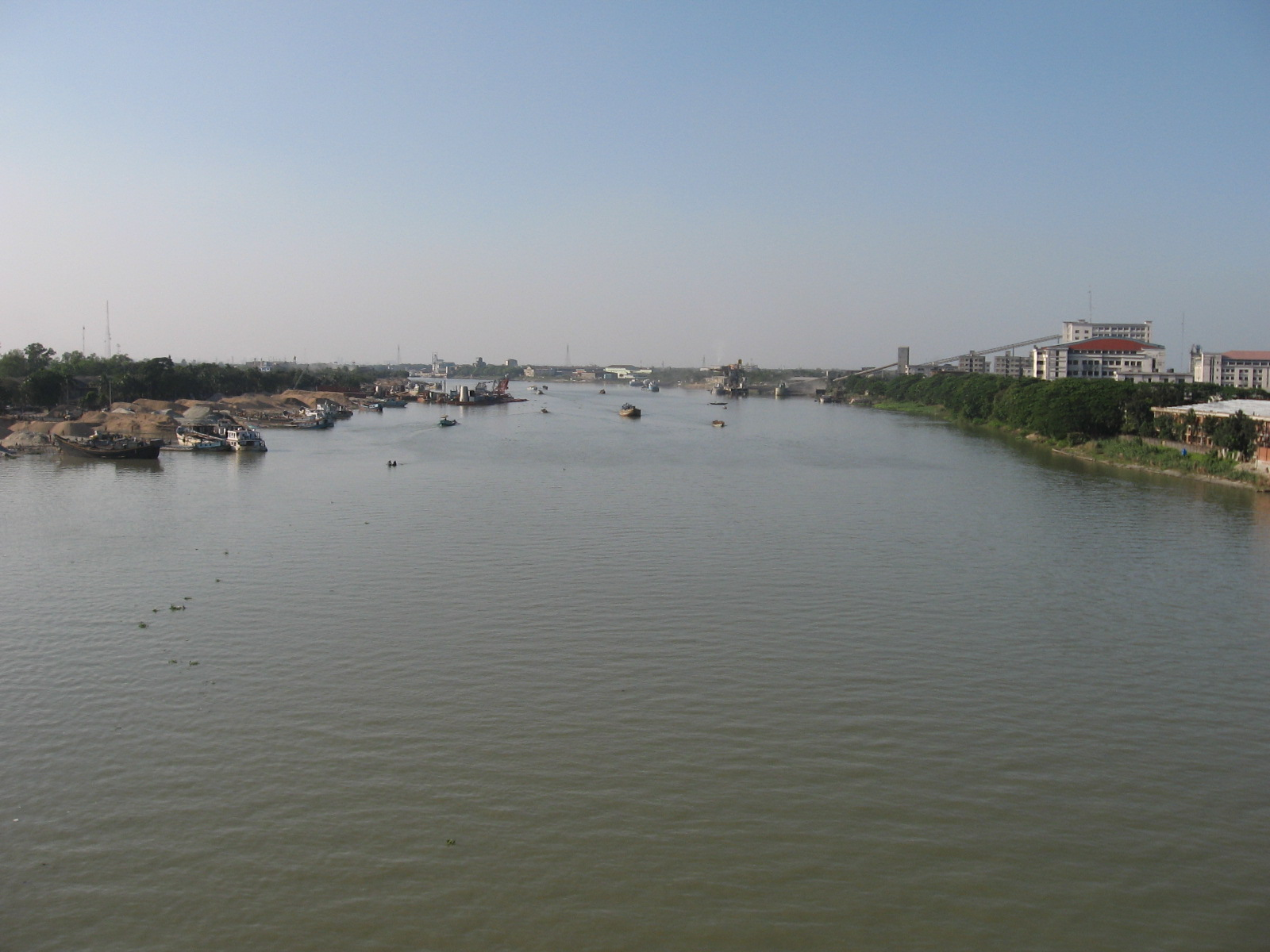
- Shitalakhya River near Narayanganj

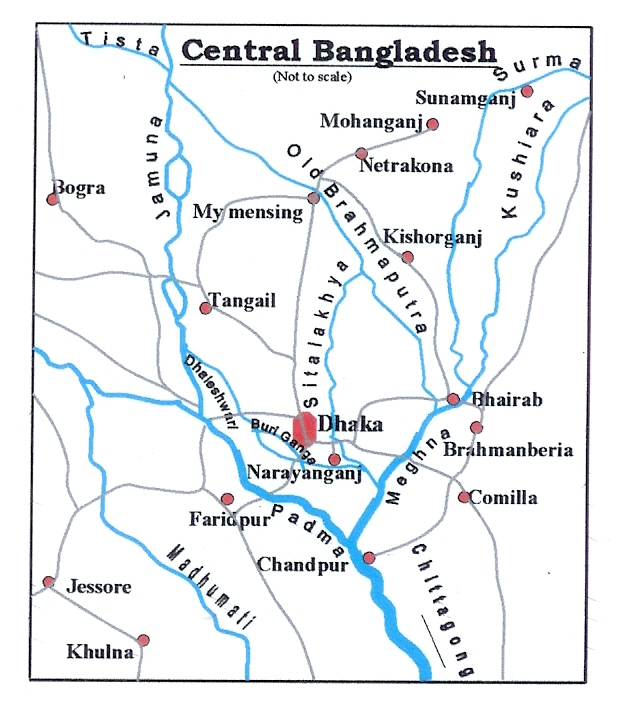

Location
- Country: Bangladesh
- City: Narayanganj

Physical characteristics
- Length: 110 km (68 mi)
- Discharge
  - location: Meghna River

Shitalakshya River (Bengali: শীতলক্ষ্যা নদী, romanized: Śītalakṣya Nadī pronounced: Shitalokkha Nodi) (also known as Lakshymā River) is a distributary of the Brahmaputra. A portion of its upper course is known as Banar River or Banor River. In the Shitalakshya's initial stages, it flows in a southwest direction and then east of the city of Narayanganj in central Bangladesh until it merges with the Dhaleswari near Kalagachhiya. The river is about 110 kilometres (68 mi) long and at it widest, near Narayanganj, it is 300 metres (980 ft) across. Its flow, measured at Demra, has reached 74 cubic metres per second (2,600 cu ft/s). It remains navigable year round. The Shitalakshya flows through Gazipur district, forming its border with Narsingdi for some distance and then through Narayanganj District.

The river's maximum depth is 21 metres (70 ft) and average depth is 10 metres (33 ft).

== Course ==
The Shitalakshya branches off the Old Brahmaputra and flows through the eastern part of Dhaka District almost parallel to the Old Brahmaputra. It passes by Narayanganj and joins the Dhaleshwari River.

In the map of Mattheus van den Brouck, director of the Dutch East India Company, the river is marked as the Lecki, flowing west of the Brahmaputra. In Van den Brouck's time (1660), it was a large and swift flowing river. It was so till the early 19th century. There, however, are some reservations about the accuracy of Van den Brouck's map.

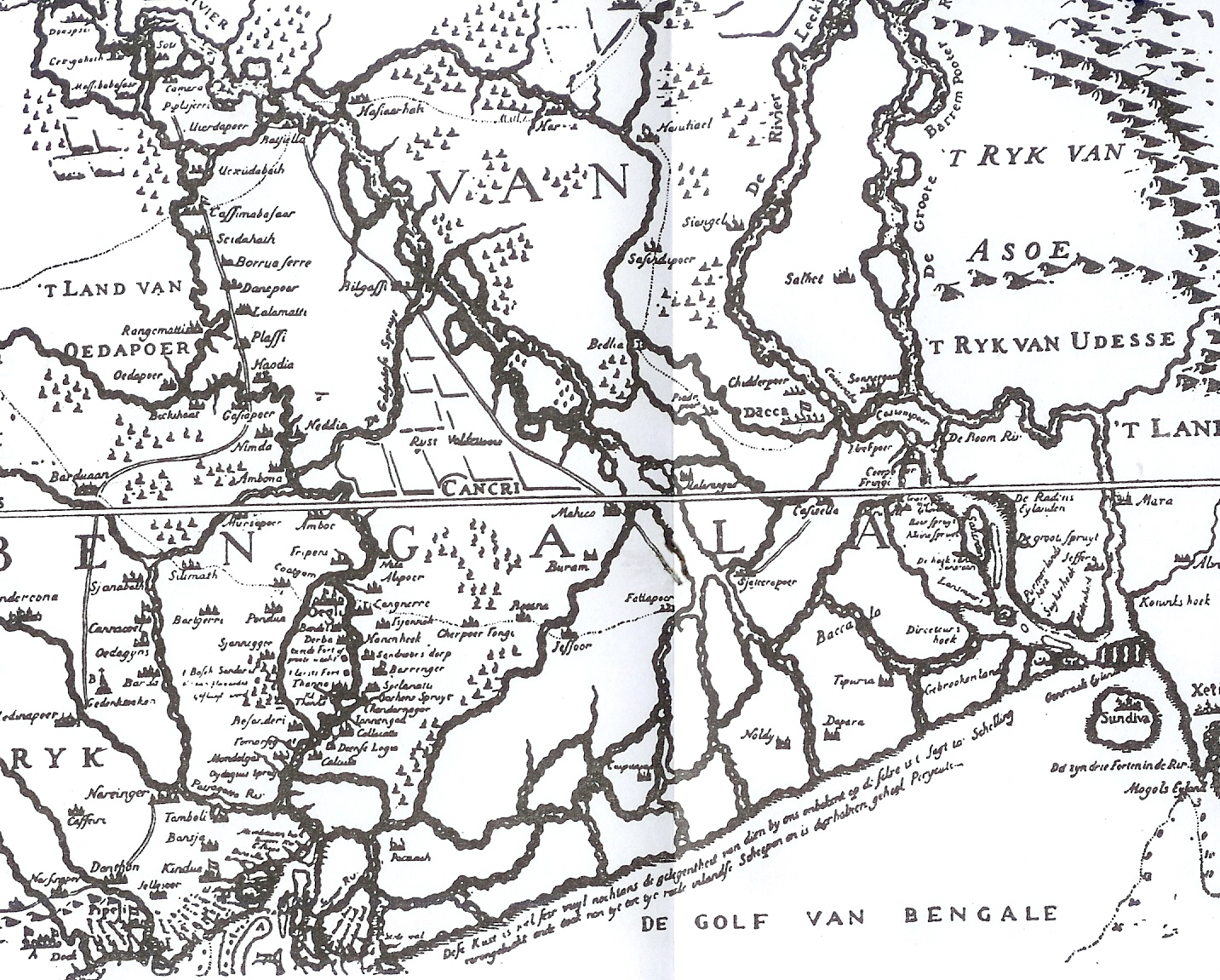
Van den Brouck's map of 1660

== Historical importance ==
Sonargaon, a former capital of the region, stood on the banks of the Shitalakshya. Isa Khan, a former ruler of the area, built a fort on the river's banks. It is believed to be connected with Lalbagh Fort in Dhaka through a tunnel. Sonakanda Fort, also on the river, was built to counter the Magh and Portuguese pirates. There are several historical mosques along Shitalakshya's banks – Bandarshahi mosque (built in 1481 by Baba Saleh), Kadam Rasul mosque (containing the footprints of Muhammad), Mariamer masjid (built by Shaista Khan), etc.

== Economic importance ==
The Shitalakshya River was once an important center for the muslin industry. Even today, there are centres of artistic weaving on its banks. There also are a number of industrial units on its banks, including the Adamjee Jute Mills. Thermal power houses are located along the river at Palash (north of Ghorashal) and at Siddhirganj.

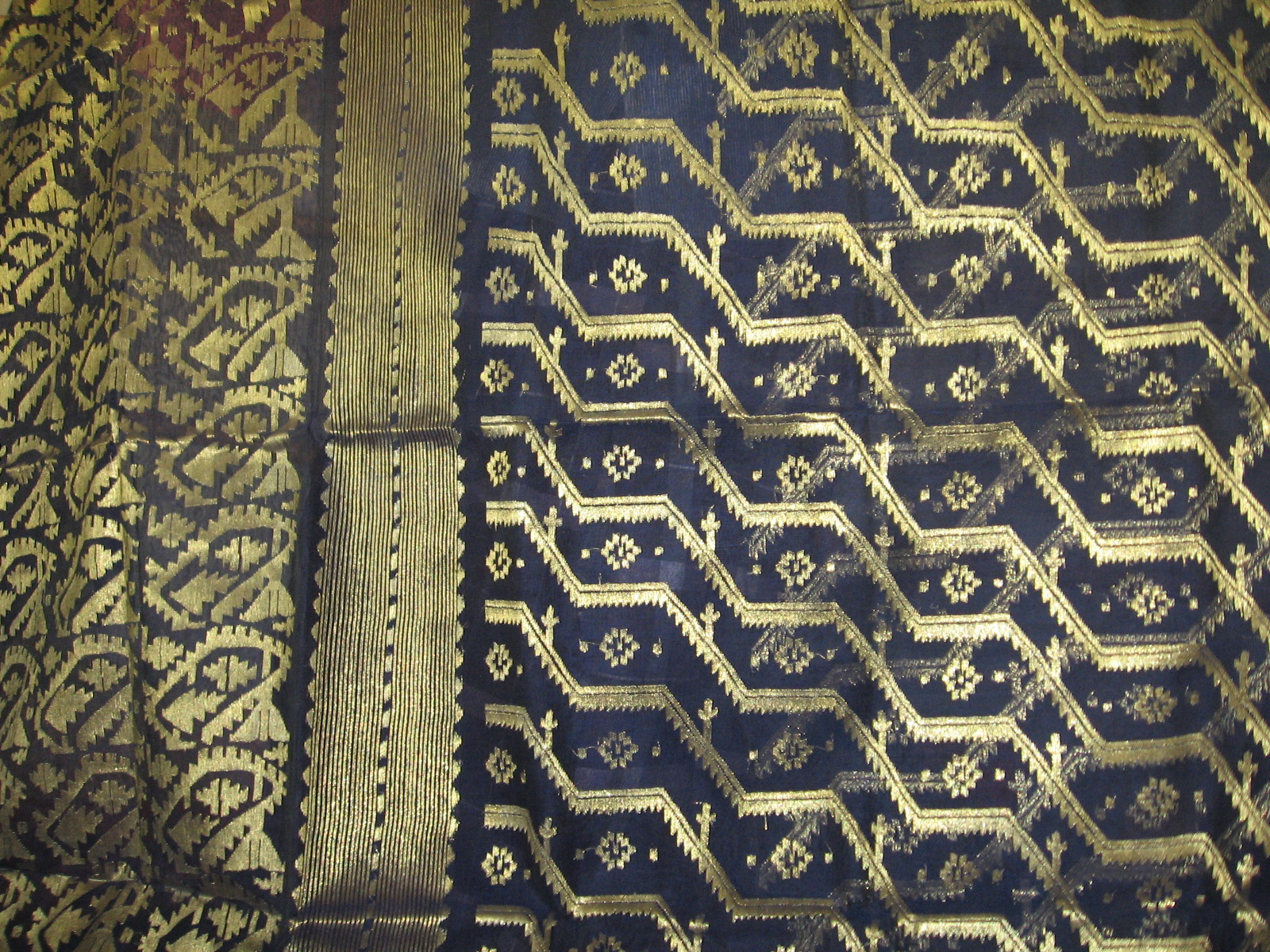
Portion of a sari woven on the banks of Shitalakshya River

There is a river port in Narayanganj. Numerous launches move out along the river to different parts of Bangladesh. The government has approved construction of a container terminal on the Shitalakhya with foreign investment.

Industrial wastewater is dumped into the river untreated. This results in high levels of water pollution.

== See also ==
- Environmental issues in Bangladesh
