= Bangshi River =

Coordinates: 24.3485°N 90.0684°E

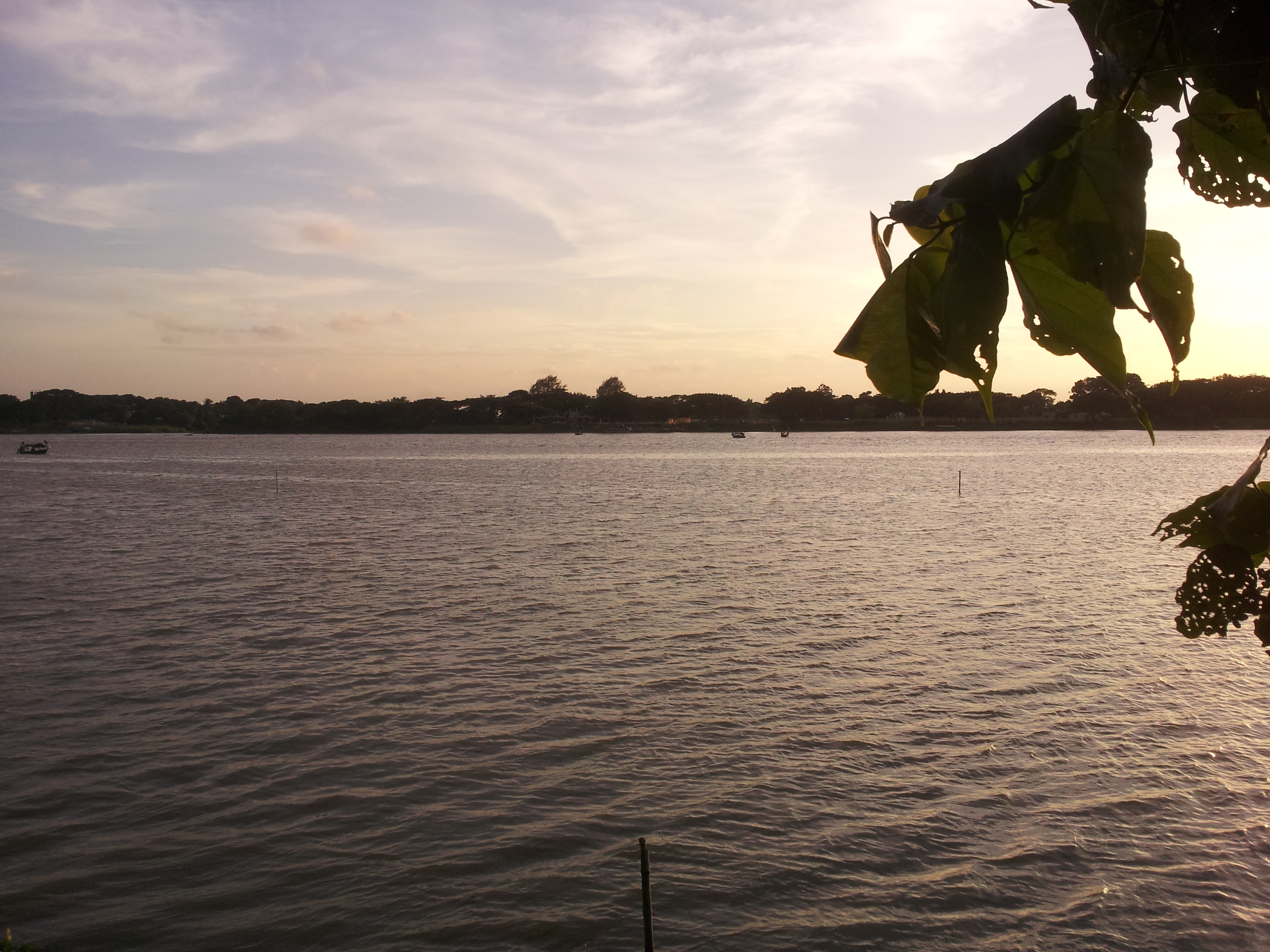
- Bangshi River beside Savar municipality

Location
- Country: Bangladesh
- Division: Dhaka
- City: Savar

Physical characteristics
- Source: Brahmaputra
- Length: 238 km (148 mi)
- Discharge
  - location: Dhaleshwari River

The Bangshi (also spelt Bansi) (Bengali: বংশী নদী) is an important river in central Bangladesh. "Bangshi" in Bengali, the language spoken in Bangladesh where the Bangshi River is located, translates to "Flute", meaning the river's name likely refers to its gentle, melodic flow, similar to the sound of a flute. It originates in Jamalpur, from the course of the old Brahmaputra and flows past the Madhupur tract. It flows through Tangail and meets the Tongi in Ghazipur. It passes near Jatiyo Smriti Soudho in Savar and falls into the Dhaleshwari. About 238 kilometres (148 mi) long, it is not navigable for most of the year except when swelled by the monsoon rains. Louhajang River is a tributary of the Bangshi. Dhamrai on the banks of the Bangshi is famous for its muslin weaving.

== Turag-Bangshi River basin ==
A report on wetland protection and enhancement says, “The Turag-Bangshi floodplain is located in Kaliakair Upazila of Gazipur District. Upstream, the basin is connected via the Dhaleswari-Pungli River to the greater Jamuna floodplain, and downstream, it is connected through the Tongi River with the Buriganga-Meghna River system. The Upper Turag-Lower Bangshi is the main source of water in the region and flows through the site. All associated beels and other floodplain areas are connected to the main river through a series of khals and other channels. This is a deeply flooded area in the low-red soil plateau of the Madhupur tract. The floodplain is inundated when water flows over the banks of the Turag-Bangshi River, making all the low-lying areas a connected sheet of water in the monsoon. By late November, most of the water recedes and boro rice is planted in almost all of the low-lying areas. During the rainy season, the water area is about 43 km^{2} while in the dry season, the water area becomes less than 7 km^{2}. About 2,68,900 people live in this area with 84% of households being involved in fishing, and 15% of households are full-time fishers.”

A Bazar NayarHat is situated at the bank, while the famous pottery village Pal Para is also situated on the south side of the Bangshi.
