= Deforestation in Nepal =

Conversion of forest to non-forest for human use in Nepal

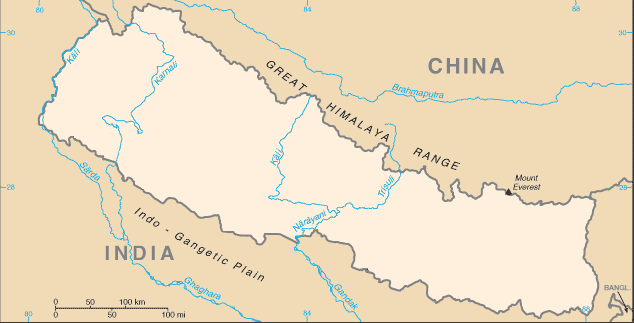
Map of Nepal

Deforestation in Nepal has always been a serious issue, which has a severe effect on the lives of poor people. In the past, Nepal was a widely forested nation. However now with the requirement for the extension of rural areas, migration of hills people to the plains, the developing regional interest for timber, and the local residents dependence on firewood as the essential source of energy, less than 30% of the nation's forest cover remains. Due to the continuous deforestation in Nepal, many people and creatures are dying. Around 70 percent of the people in Nepal work in agriculture, even if it is difficult to farm in the prevailing unfavourable weather conditions.

== Rate of deforestation ==
Between 1990 and 2000, Nepal lost an average of 91,700 hectares of forest per year. This amounts to an average annual deforestation rate of 1.90%. However, between 2000 and 2005, the rate of deforestation decreased by 28.9% to 1.35% per year. In total, between 1990 and 2005, Nepal lost 24.5% of its forest cover, or around 1,181,000 hectares. 42,000 hectares of its primary forest cover was last during that time. Deforestation rates of primary cover have decreased 10.7% since the close of the 1990s. Measuring the total rate of habitat conversion (defined as change in forest area plus change in woodland area minus net plantation expansion) for the 1990-2005 interval, Nepal lost 7.9% of its forest and woodland habitat.

== Tree cover extent and loss ==
Global Forest Watch publishes annual estimates of tree cover loss and 2000 tree cover extent derived from time-series analysis of Landsat satellite imagery in the Global Forest Change dataset. In this framework, tree cover refers to vegetation taller than 5 m (including natural forests and tree plantations), and tree cover loss is defined as the complete removal of tree cover canopy for a given year, regardless of cause.

For Nepal, country statistics report cumulative tree cover loss of 58,320 ha (583.2 km^{2}) from 2001 to 2024 (about 1.1% of its 2000 tree cover area). For tree cover density greater than 30%, country statistics report a 2000 tree cover extent of 5,161,038 ha (51,610.38 km^{2}). The charts and table below display this data. In simple terms, the annual loss number is the area where tree cover disappeared in that year, and the extent number shows what remains of the 2000 tree cover baseline after subtracting cumulative loss. Forest regrowth is not included in the dataset.

Annual tree cover loss in Nepal, 2001–2024. View chart definition.
Tree cover extent in 2000 minus cumulative tree cover loss in Nepal, 2001–2024 (loss-only residual; does not account for gain). View chart definition.

Annual tree cover extent and loss
Year	Tree cover extent (km2) (Note: This residual measure does not include forest regrowth.)	Annual tree cover loss (km2)
2001	51,595.16	15.22
2002	51,573.87	21.29
2003	51,550.95	22.92
2004	51,526.15	24.80
2005	51,498.57	27.58
2006	51,466.02	32.55
2007	51,431.37	34.65
2008	51,401.44	29.93
2009	51,346.19	55.25
2010	51,322.70	23.49
2011	51,294.54	28.16
2012	51,244.09	50.45
2013	51,235.74	8.35
2014	51,224.12	11.62
2015	51,218.34	5.78
2016	51,208.35	9.99
2017	51,184.41	23.94
2018	51,167.69	16.72
2019	51,146.82	20.87
2020	51,124.49	22.33
2021	51,096.96	27.53
2022	51,076.74	20.22
2023	51,053.97	22.77
2024	51,027.18	26.79

== Smuggling of timber ==
Nepal has fallen victim to illegal timber processing in many of Nepal's forests. These timber operations illegally smuggle wood into India. Sources say that the smuggling is being done on both major roads and back roads. Nepal's forest administration has confiscated many trucks and tractors laden with timber from Nepal's forests.

== Biodiversity effects of Nepal ==
Biodiversity and Protected Areas are at risk due to deforestation. The country of Nepal has 1240 known species of amphibians, birds, mammals and reptiles according to figures from the World Conservation Monitoring Centre. Of this population 2.9% are endemic, meaning they exist in no other country, and 5.6% are threatened. In addition, Nepal is home to at least 6973 species of plants, of which 4.5% are native to the country itself. Not to mention, Nepal's bamboo forests are home to the Red Panda, a threatened species, found very few places in the world. These animals are even more prone to extinction with the high level of deforestation occurring.

== Government regulation ==
In the past, a government decision to nationalize and take over popular management of what were perceived as private forests in 1957 proved disastrous, partly because protectionist practices undercut indigenous management systems. The state faced rampant deforestation and degradation, and consequently devastating floods, according to Ghan Shyam Pandey, coordinator of the Global Alliance of Community Forestry (GACF), a Nepal-based network representing forest communities. It wasn't until the mid-1970s that those in power realized peoples' participation was key for conservation and securing livelihoods, and started the first forays into community-based forest management. Community Forestry Users Groups (CFUGs) were established with the aim of stewarding the land and using its resources sustainably.

== REDD+ reference levels and forest monitoring ==
Nepal has submitted national forest reference level (FRL) information to the UNFCCC under the REDD+ framework. These submissions are subject to a UNFCCC technical assessment in the context of results-based payments.

Nepal’s first national FRL was submitted in January 2017 and technically assessed in 2018. It used a 2000–2010 historical reference period and included emissions from deforestation and forest degradation (fuelwood extraction), and removals from enhancement of forest carbon stocks through afforestation/reforestation. The assessed annual averages were 929,325 t CO2e per year from deforestation, 408,500 t CO2e per year from forest degradation, and 151,077 t CO2e per year in removals from enhancement of forest carbon stocks. The technical assessment reported that the FRL included above-ground and below-ground biomass pools and reported carbon dioxide only.

In January 2026 Nepal submitted an updated national FRL for the 2008–2017 reference period, which the UNFCCC REDD+ web platform lists as “under technical assessment”. The proposed FRL reports annual emissions of 958,601 t CO2e per year from deforestation and 8,572,211 t CO2e per year from forest degradation, and annual removals of 2,535,863 t CO2e per year from enhancement of forest carbon stocks (afforestation/reforestation). The submission describes a Landsat time-series approach to forest-cover change mapping (including LandTrendr in Google Earth Engine), sample-based reference data collection (Collect Earth Online), and uncertainty estimation using Monte Carlo simulation. It retains CO2 as the only gas and omits dead wood, litter and soil organic carbon after assessing them as non-significant or lacking credible data.

Nepal has also reported safeguards and strategy elements associated with REDD+. A first Summary of Information describes how the Cancún safeguards are being addressed and respected and outlines the country’s safeguards information system approach. Nepal’s National REDD+ Strategy (2025–2034) describes upgrading the National Forest Information System toward a more comprehensive National Forest Monitoring System to support monitoring, reporting and verification (MRV) and future FRL updates.

== Economic impact of deforestation in Nepal ==
Climate change, deforestation and land grabbing don't only threaten Nepal's rich biodiversity, but the economic well-being of millions of its citizens. These community based forests that are falling victim to deforestion through smuggling and other industries hold potential economic value to its natives. With around 40 percent of the country covered in forest and shrubland, millions of rural Nepalese rely on forest biodiversity for subsistence, and as a source of income. Agriculture, including forestry, employs around 80 percent of the population.

Government and civil society in Nepal have been working to insure conservation by giving communities a share of the spoils helping steward the land.

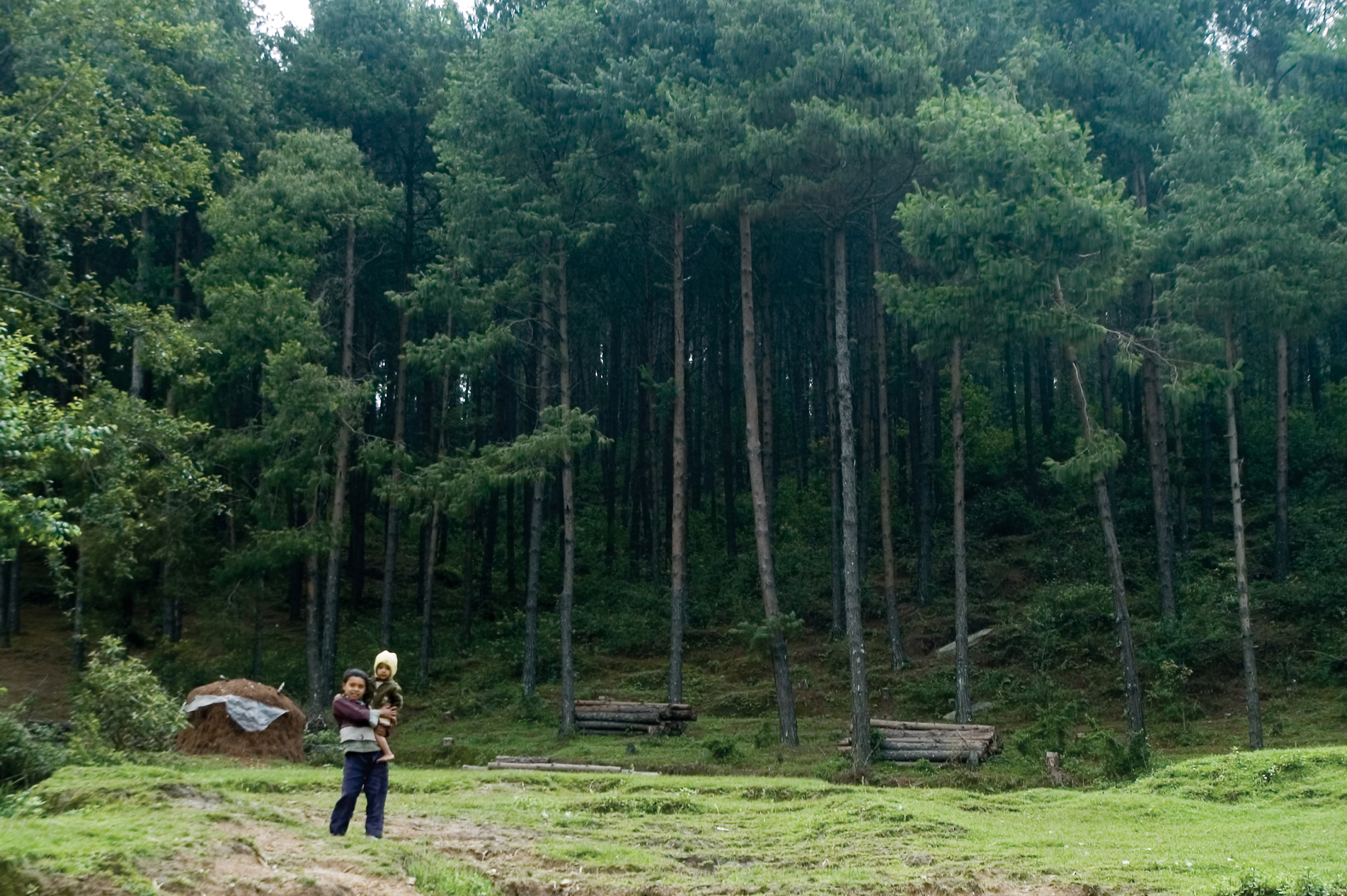

The process of marketing local products has become difficult. When community forestry produces local food or local products, they find it difficult to compete on local and national markets. Big companies dominate over local products. The stability and fertility of the agricultural land depend absolutely on the maintenance of a healthy forest. It has been estimated that a forest area three times the arable area may be necessary for the maintenance of the agricultural system as a whole.

Yet over the last decades the forest area has declined dramatically, and the trend is continuing. The problem of deforestation in Nepal is not one of exploitation by outsiders; there are almost no roads in the Hills, and logging on a commercial scale would not be feasible. The problem stems rather from the acute and increasing pressure on the land. The Hill population is now estimated at 1,500 people per square kilometer of cultivable land, with livestock numbers comparable to the human population.

Throughout the Hill districts of Nepal the cycle of environmental degradation is clear. Land that once supported healthy regenerating forest is now covered with scrubby, largely unpalatable bush vegetation in which continuous overgrazing and lopping for fodder has prevented any regeneration and gradually removed the valuable edible species. Women have to walk farther and farther to collect fuel and fodder for the family's needs; in many parts of the district the round trip takes a full day. In local markets and centers of population a backload of wood may sell for the equivalent of two days' wages.

As the productivity of the forest declines through relentless overcutting, its ability to provide nutrients to the arable fields, through fodder and leaf litter, is also reduced, and crop yields start to fall. This, combined with direct population pressure, pushes cultivation on to steep and marginal land, greatly increasing the risk of landslides and soil erosion. In Doti, a district typical of the remote far west of the country, monsoon floods in 1983 did unprecedented and permanent damage to the land. Old farmers remembered similar rains, but the recent imbalance between forest and cultivated land makes the effects this time far more severe.

== See also ==
- Environmental issues in Nepal
