= Environmental issues in Bangladesh =

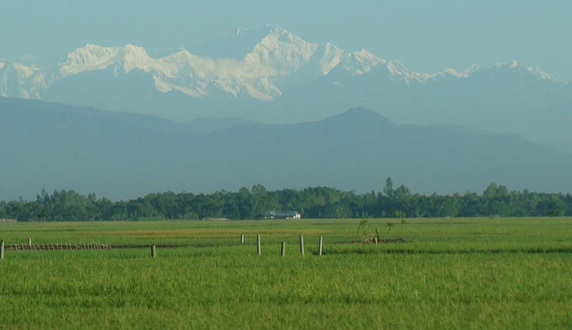
Plains of Bangladesh

Bangladesh, with an area of 147,570 km^{2}, features a flood plain landscape and several river systems throughout the country. This landscape provides the major natural resources of water, land, fisheries, forests, and wildlife. The country currently faces several environmental issues which threaten these resources, including groundwater metal contamination, increased groundwater salinity, cyclones and flooding, and sedimentation and changing patterns of stream flow due to watershed mismanagement. Some of these, such as the changing patterns of stream flow and presence of lead in groundwater, can be directly correlated with human activity and industrial processes, while others, such as cyclones and flooding are naturally occurring issues.

Many of these issues are further exacerbated by climate change in Bangladesh, which causes increased occurrence of storms and cyclones and rising sea levels. According to the Notre Dame Global Adaptation Index, Bangladesh is the 43rd most vulnerable country to the effects of climate change, and the 37th least prepared country to adapt to these effects. There has been some government actions taken to address these issues.

== Air pollution ==
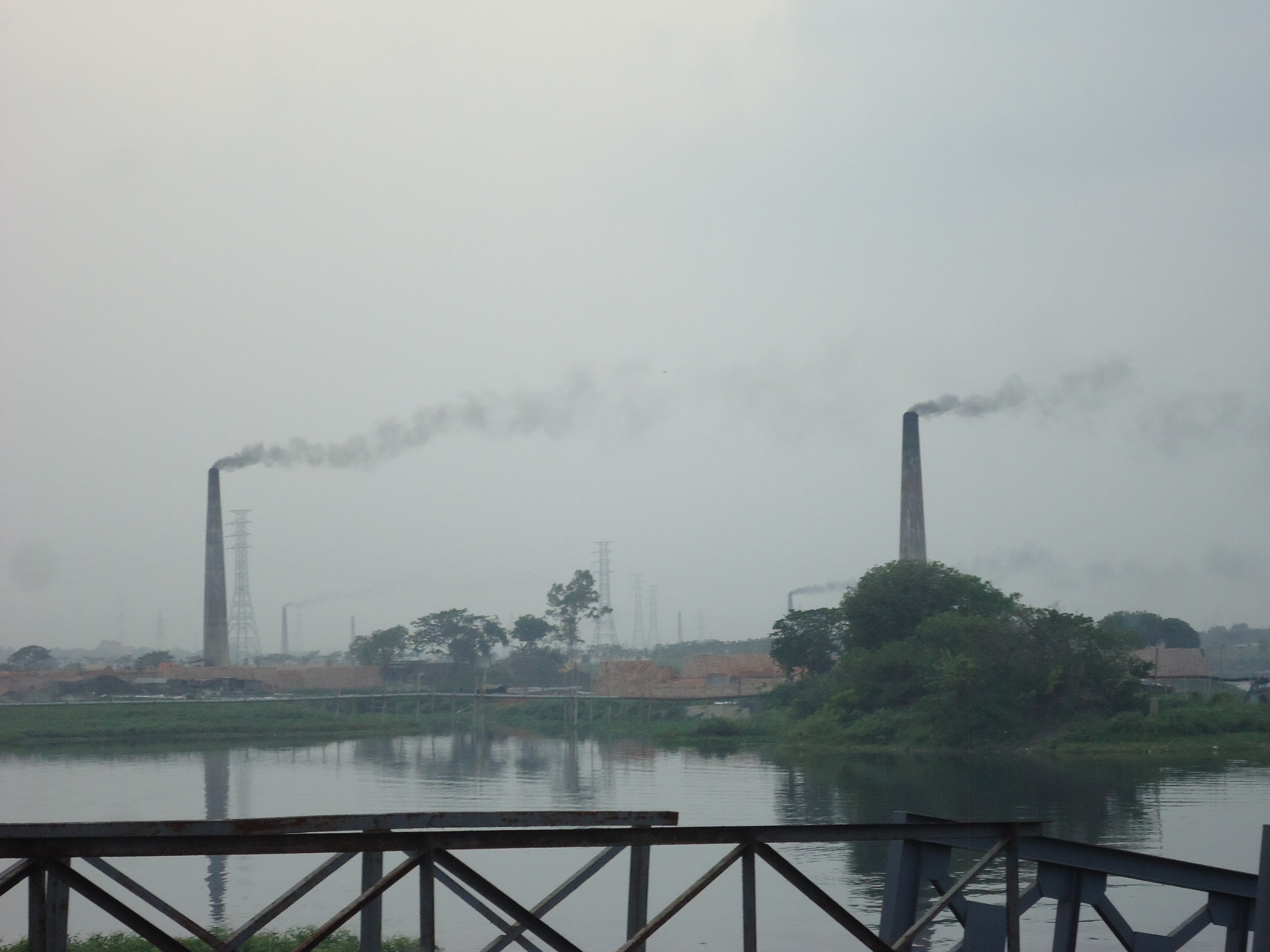
Black smoke is being emitted from an industrial factory in Dhaka

Air pollution is one of the most pressing environmental issues in Bangladesh, with the country frequently ranking among the most polluted in the world. According to the World Air Quality Report, Bangladesh was the country with the worst air quality in 2020, a situation that has persisted over several years. The primary sources of air pollution include emissions from motor vehicles, industrial activities, brick kilns, construction dust, and the burning of biomass. The country's rapid urbanization, combined with inadequate infrastructure and weak enforcement of environmental regulations, has significantly exacerbated the problem.

Dhaka, the capital city, often records some of the highest levels of particulate matter (PM2.5 and PM10), which are microscopic particles that can penetrate deep into the lungs and even enter the bloodstream. These pollutants are particularly dangerous, contributing to severe health conditions such as respiratory and cardiovascular diseases, stroke and lung cancer. According to the State of Global Air report in 2021, at last 236,000 people died due to air pollution in Bangladesh. According to a World Bank study, air pollution is responsible for 20 percent of premature deaths in Bangladesh.

The brick kiln industry is one of the largest contributors to air pollution in Bangladesh. These kilns often operate without proper emission controls, releasing large amounts of soot and other harmful pollutants into the atmosphere. The transportation sector is another significant source, with the country's aging fleet of vehicles emitting high levels of nitrogen oxides, carbon monoxide, and volatile organic compounds (VOCs). Additionally, industrial activities, particularly in the textile and cement industries, contribute to the high levels of sulfur dioxide and other pollutants.

Government efforts to combat air pollution have included the implementation of the Clean Air and Sustainable Environment (CASE) project, which aims to improve air quality monitoring and reduce emissions from key sectors. The introduction of compressed natural gas (CNG) for vehicles and the enforcement of emission standards are other measures that have been taken. However, challenges such as corruption, lack of public awareness, and insufficient funding continue to hinder effective implementation of these policies.

International organizations like the World Bank and the Asian Development Bank have also been involved in efforts to mitigate air pollution in Bangladesh, providing financial and technical assistance. Despite these efforts, the scale of air pollution remains daunting, and more comprehensive and sustained actions are needed to address this critical public health issue.

== Water pollution ==
=== Rivers ===
Because of high population density, rapid urbanization, and industrial expansion, pollution of water bodies in Bangladesh's largest city, Dhaka, is widespread. Untreated domestic sewage and industrial effluent are illegally discharged into rivers and canals. A variety of pollutants have been measured and studied, such as nutrients (nitrogen and phosphorus), coliforms, metals, and pesticides. Measurements in the rivers near Dhaka show extremely high organic pollution loading, high ammonia, and very low dissolved oxygen levels, which are close to zero in the dry season.

Surveys in the rivers around Dhaka show extremely high pollution and very low dissolved oxygen levels, with subsequent ecological impacts. Millions of people are not connected to municipal wastewater treatment plants, and thousands of factories discharge into the rivers. The Bangladesh Government is planning to install over 12 large sewage treatment plants over the next 20 years (as of 2023).

Climate change in Bangladesh is expected to have an impact on the Dhaka River System water quality, with increased monsoon flows and lower summer flows. However, these changes will not greatly affect the extremes of water quality to any great extent due to the overwhelming impact of pollutant discharges into the system.

=== Groundwater ===
Groundwater in Bangladesh, which is used as drinking water, is found to be contaminated with many heavy metals, including arsenic, lead, cadmium, chromium, copper, mercury, nickel, and uranium. Of these, arsenic has been determined to be the most significant health issue, with about 49% of the water being likely contaminated with concentrations above the WHO guidelines, affecting 35 to 77 million people within the country. Arsenic contamination of shallow groundwater is a natural occurring problem that has been further made worse by the use of tube wells, which extract groundwater. Since the 1970s, the government started instituting the use of shallow tube wells to avoid the consumption of surface water, which is often contaminated with various bacteria. These tube wells, however, reached the arsenic-contaminated groundwater. This issue is more prevalent in inland areas and for rural areas, where 97% of the population uses tube wells. Health effects of consumption of arsenic-contaminated water include skin pigmentation changes and lesions, which could be a precursor to skin cancer. It can also cause lung and bladder consumption, as well as developmental effects, neurotoxicity, diabetes, pulmonary disease and cardiovascular disease.

Lead contamination has been found to be high in areas around Dhaka. It has been postulated that this is due to the many industries in the area, including battery recycling facilities. The Department of Environment found more than 1200 industrial sites that caused significant pollution. Reasons for the additional metal contamination include mining and agricultural activity. The presence of lead in the water affects the environment, as well as human health. The presence of lead in soil also led to a concentration of lead in the leaves of plants grown in the area.

In coastal areas, the heavy metal contamination has also had an effect in marine life and the local ecology. This, in turn, affects the economic output of the region that relies partly on aquaculture. For instance, high levels of metals may affect the reproductive capabilities of the native ecology or contaminate the fish. If the fish have too high levels of metals, a fisher may not be able to sell it for consumption. If a consumer eats fish with high levels of metal contamination, he is at risk for health issues, such as cancer, kidney failure, or various metal poisoning. There is also a possibility that fish will move further away from these areas, to avoid the toxic areas, which would also affect the livelihood of the fishermen in the area.

There has been some effort by the government to provide deeper tube wells that are clearly marked as arsenic free, as well as by various NGOs to provide filters to remove the heavy metal contaminants.

==== Groundwater salinity ====
In the coastal regions of Bangladesh, which make up 32% of the land in the country, there are problems of salinity due to high tides and reduced flow in rivers during the dry season. There is already a natural seasonal fluctuation of rising levels of salt water. During the dry season, a salt water front rises 240 km. This affects the salinity of the groundwater in the countryside. This effect is predicted to be more severe in the future because of climate change, because of rising sea levels. As a result, sea water will leak further into freshwater zones, which will have a broad reaching effect on the flora and fauna of the region that depends on the presence of fresh water. For example, if the sea level rises 88 cm, the water 40 km inland will be contaminated with a 5 ppt saline front. This would specifically affect the only freshwater region of the Tetulia River, the Meghna Estuary. The salinity level in the Meghna Estuary, the largest estuarine system in Bangladesh, may become too high to sustain agriculture and pisciculture. It could also lead to the extinction of some of the endangered species of the Estuary.

In addition to affecting the natural flora and fauna of regions of coastal Bangladesh, increased salinity could also affect the soil salinity, and therefore the agriculture output of the regions. This trend has already been seen in coastal regions like Satkhira, where the net area of cultivated land decreased by 7% from 1996 to 2008. Rice production was particular affected, decreasing from 0.3 million tons to 0.1 million tons from 2008 to 2010. If the sea levels rise as predicted in a "moderate" climate scenario, Bangladesh is predicted to produce 0.2 million fewer crops. This number is predicted to be doubled for a "severe" climate scenario. This issue affects both the economic stability of regions that rely mostly on rice growth for income and the lifestyle and eating habits of a region that relies on a rice-based diet. Additionally, poorer families tend to be disproportionately affected by the issue of groundwater salinity.

== Cyclones and flooding ==
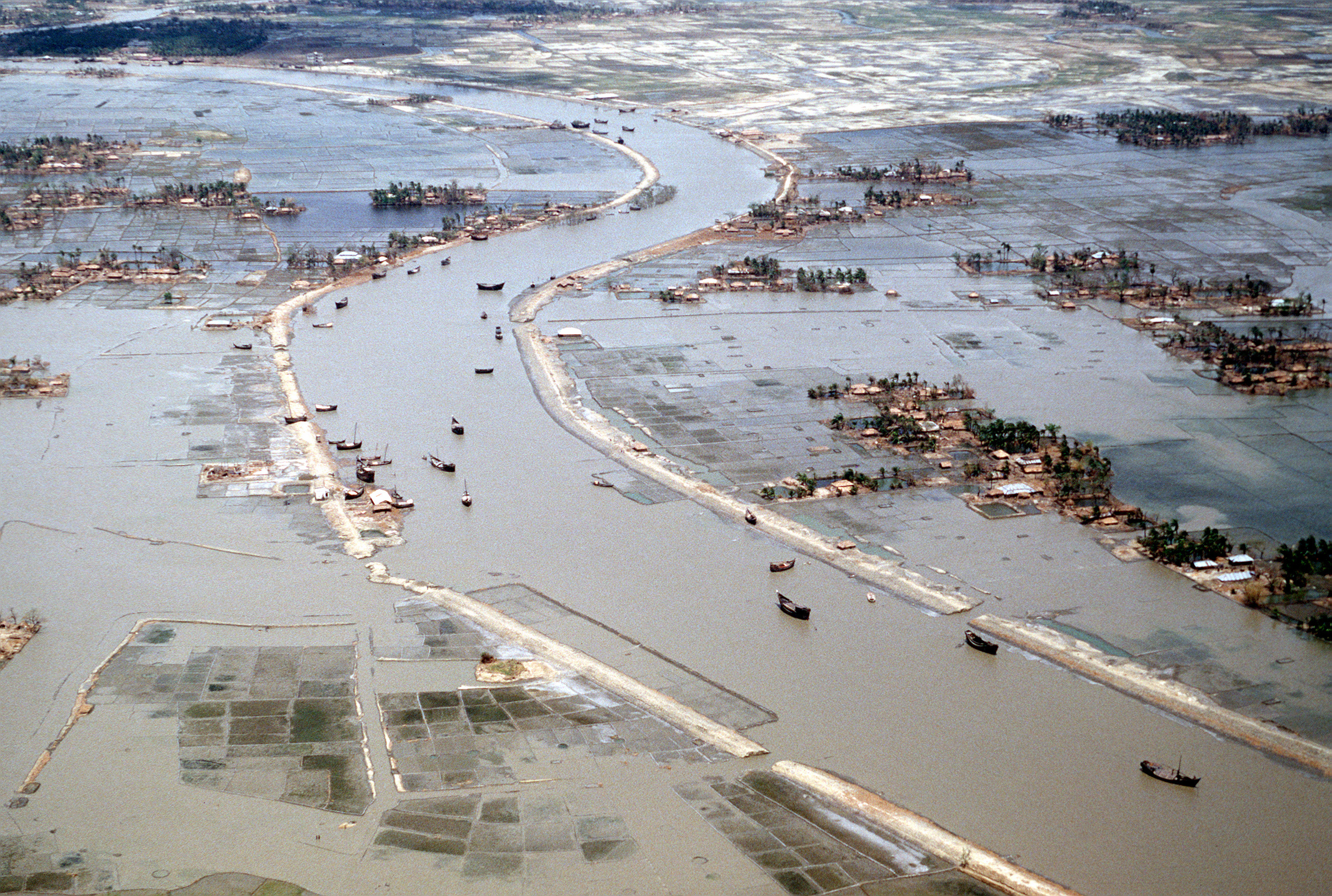
Flooding after 1991 cyclone in Bangladesh

The coastal region of Bangladesh is especially prone to cyclones. Between 1793 and 1996, there has been one cyclone about every 4.5 years. This has a detrimental effect on the local environment, as well as on families and their property. For instance, a cyclone that hit in 1970 caused 300,000 deaths and US$86.4 million of property damage. Cyclones can detrimentally affect the food production of the area. In 1991, a cyclone caused the destruction of 60% of the cattle stock in the affected area, 80% of the poultry stock in the affected area, and exposed 72,000 ha of rice paddies to salt water.

Cyclones can cause storm surges, which further affect those who live in coastal areas. Furthermore, it adds to the flooding that the area is already prone to. 20 to 22% of the land is flooded between June and October. Studies by the International Panel on Climate Change (IPCC) have shown that climate change and the resulting rising sea levels would further exacerbate this. For example, a 45 cm increase in sea level would result in 75% of the mangrove forest area being flooded. Furthermore, increased sedimentation in the watersheds may lead to more flooding.

Flooding has been cited as one of the "main obstacle[s] to the economic improvement of the nation". It affects the agricultural economy and the food security of the nation, since almost 74% of the land is cultivated. If significant portions of this land becomes flooded, it cannot be used for to produce agricultural products. Flooding tends to disproportionately affect the poorer more, with the poor being 2.5 times more likely to be "severely distress[ed]" during flooding than the wealthy. The last major flood in Sylhet occurred in June 2022. There were heavy rains starting in May 2022, which caused significant flooding by mid-June.

== Watershed management ==
The effect of increased human and animal population, as well as land use in the Himalayan Mountains have caused soil erosion, which could have resulted in the extra deposition of sediments in the Bangladesh watersheds. This may have effects on the soil composition near the watershed and the propensity of the area to flood. While Eckholm and Myers have proposed a now popular theory that there is a direct causal relationship between deforestation in Nepal and higher flooding in the Bangladesh watersheds, there is not enough evidence to determine whether or not this is true. Improper watershed management does lead to sedimentation in reservoirs and changing patterns of stream flow. Sedimentation in reservoirs effects the turbidity of the reservoir, and erosion patterns along the river. It also presents a cost to the government who has to dredge the rivers of its sediments. In Bangladesh, the government has to remove 0.8 million cubic meters of maintenance dredging and 2 million cubic meters of capital dredging per year. Since scientists do not unanimously agree the degree to which watershed management affects patterns of stream flow and flooding, it is difficult determine the extent of this effect.

== Forest degradation ==
Bangladesh had a 2018 Forest Landscape Integrity Index mean score of 5.45/10, ranking it 101st globally out of 172 countries.

== Government response to environmental issues ==
In response to the environmental issues that the country faces, the Bangladeshi government formed the Ministry of Environment and Forests (MoEF) in 1989, which addresses these issues and considers the role of climate change in the country's development. MoEF oversees the Department of Environment and Forest Department, which enforce environmental law and protect the natural biodiversity in the country respectively.

There has also been efforts by local government to address climate change related issues. For instance, some local governments have invested in shelters to reduce cyclone-related mortalities.

=== Reducing river pollution from industries ===
As of 2023, there are several projects going on that aim to reduce the industrial effluent load to rivers in Dhaka. These include Partnership for Cleaner Textile 2, Zero Discharge of Hazardous Chemical, Green Industry Development Cell, etc. There are also ongoing cleaner production drives within industries registered with Bangladesh Garment Manufacturers and Exporters Association (BGMEA) and Bangladesh Knitwear Manufacturers and Exporters Association (BKMEA). They operate with a synergistic relationship with the 3R (Reduce, Recycle, Reuse) strategy undertaken by the Department of Environment as entailed under the National Environmental Policy 2018. All these initiatives aim reduce pollution through lesser pollution load per unit production.

== See also ==
- Climate change in Bangladesh
