= Notre Dame Global Adaptation Index =

Climate-related performance metric

Notre Dame Global Adaptation Index is a program of the University of Notre Dame’s Environmental Change Initiative. The Notre Dame Global Adaptation Index, or ND-GAIN, ranks the climate adaptation performance for 177 countries over the last 17 years. One of ND-GAIN’s goals is to assist decision-makers in the public and private sectors to gain a better understanding of the climate adaptation. Metrics can help decision makers identify and prioritize adaptation measures to allocate investment most effectively and build resilience to climate change.

Standard and Poor used a composite of three variables, including ND-GAIN “to capture facets of potential vulnerability to arrive at a ranking” of 116 sovereigns for their report “Climate Change Is A Global Mega-Trend For Sovereign Risk." The ND-GAIN Country Profiles provide all of the data and their sources, organized by specific vulnerability and readiness measures such as water availability, food security and education level. According to ND-GAIN as of 2013, it will take more than 100 years for the world's poorest countries to reach the current adaptive capacity of higher-income OECD countries. In 2014 ND-GAIN found Norway, New Zealand, Sweden, Finland and Denmark the countries most prepared to adapt to climate change while the Democratic Republic of Congo, Central African Republic, Eritrea, Burundi and Chad were found the most vulnerable.
