= Dhaleshwari River =

Coordinates: 23.995°N 90.222°E

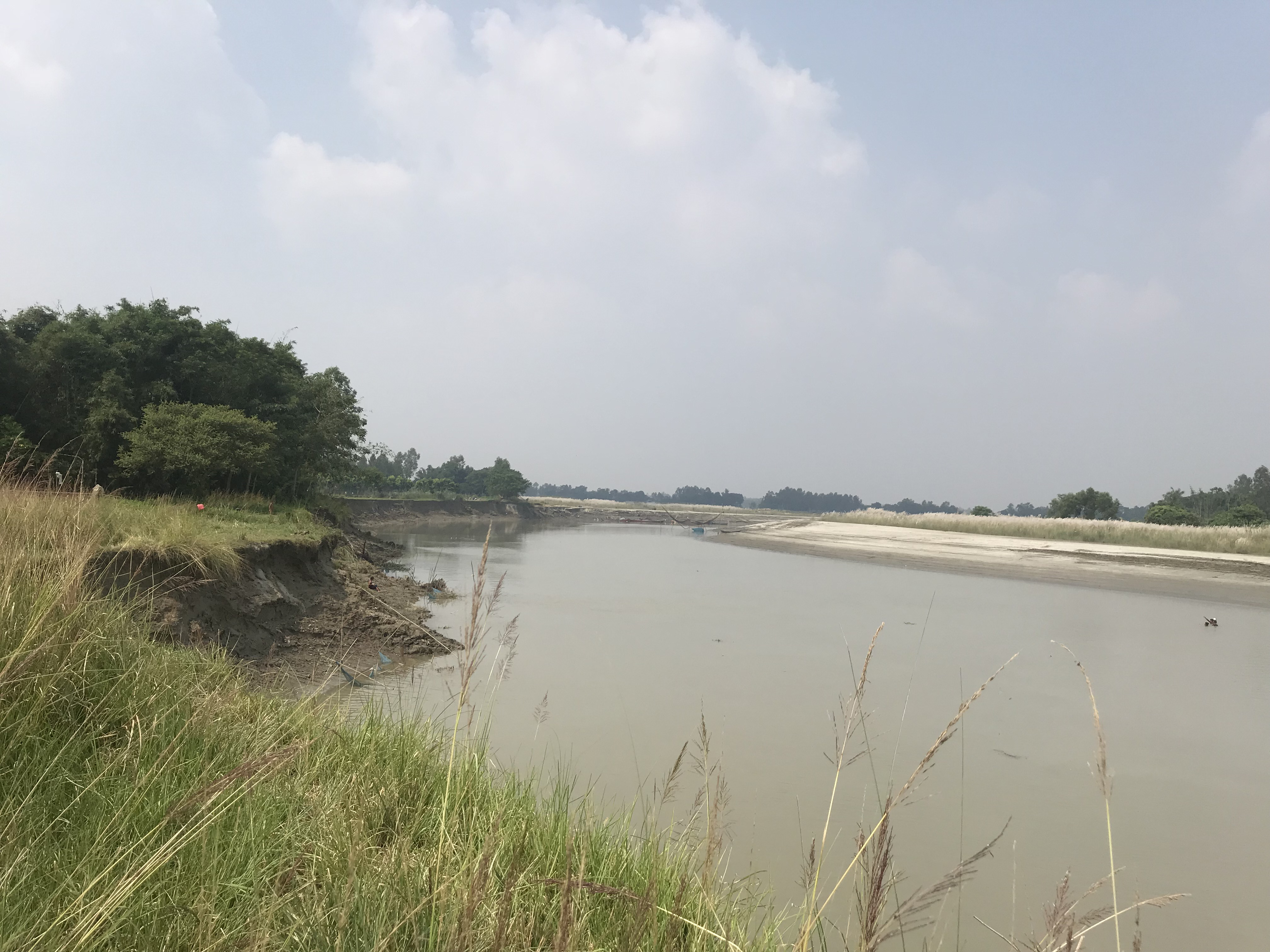

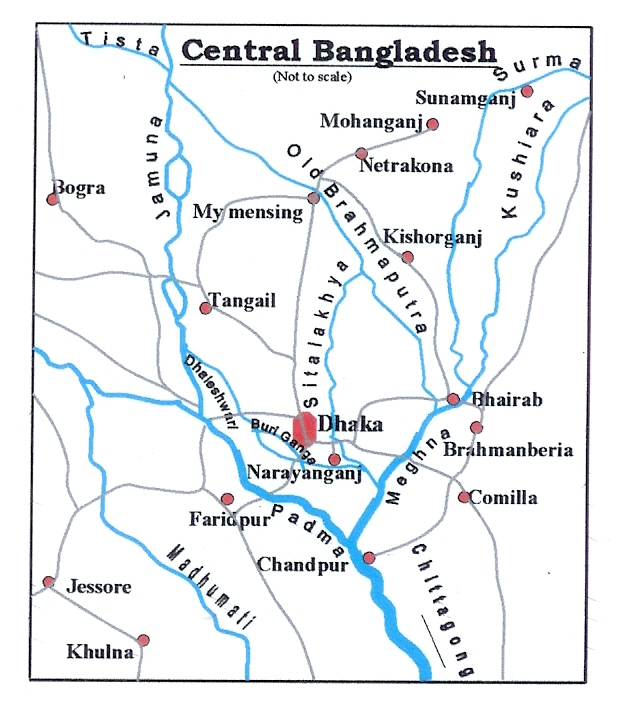

Location
- Country: Bangladesh

Physical characteristics
- Source: Jamuna River
- Length: 160 km (99 mi)
- Discharge
  - location: Shitalakshya River

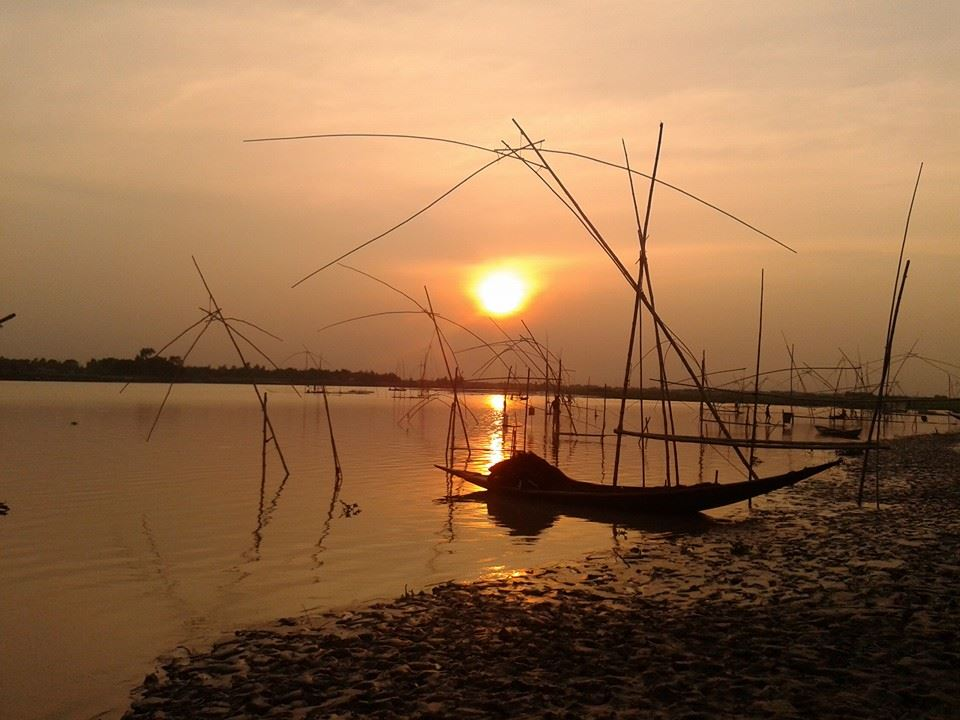

The Dhaleshwari River (Bengali: ধলেশ্বরী, romanized: Dhalēśbarī , Dhôleshshori) is a distributary, 160 kilometres (99 mi) long, of the Jamuna River in central Bangladesh. It branches off from the Jamuna near the northwestern tip of Tangail District into two streams: the northern branch retains the name Dhaleshwari, while the other becomes the Kaliganga River. The two rejoin in southern part of Manikganj District. Finally the merged flow meets the Shitalakshya River near Narayanganj District. This combined flow goes southwards to merge into the Meghna River.

Average depth of river is 122 feet (37 m) and maximum depth is 265 feet (81 m).

Water pollution of the Dhaleshwari River by the textile industry has been described by academics as an ecocide.

== See also ==
- Environmental issues in Bangladesh
- Rivers of Bangladesh
