= Savar DOHS =

Savar DOHS DOHS
- Residential area
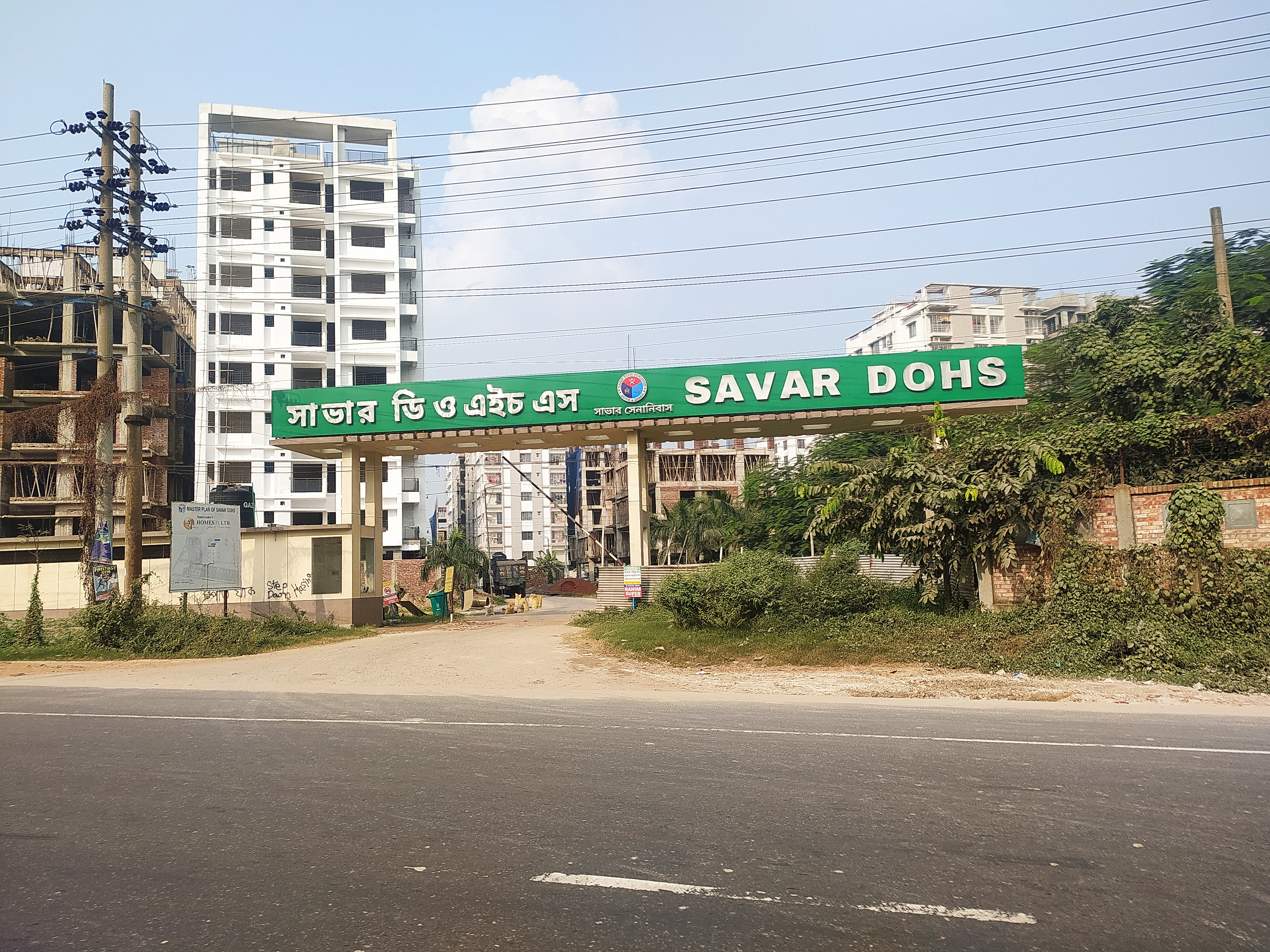

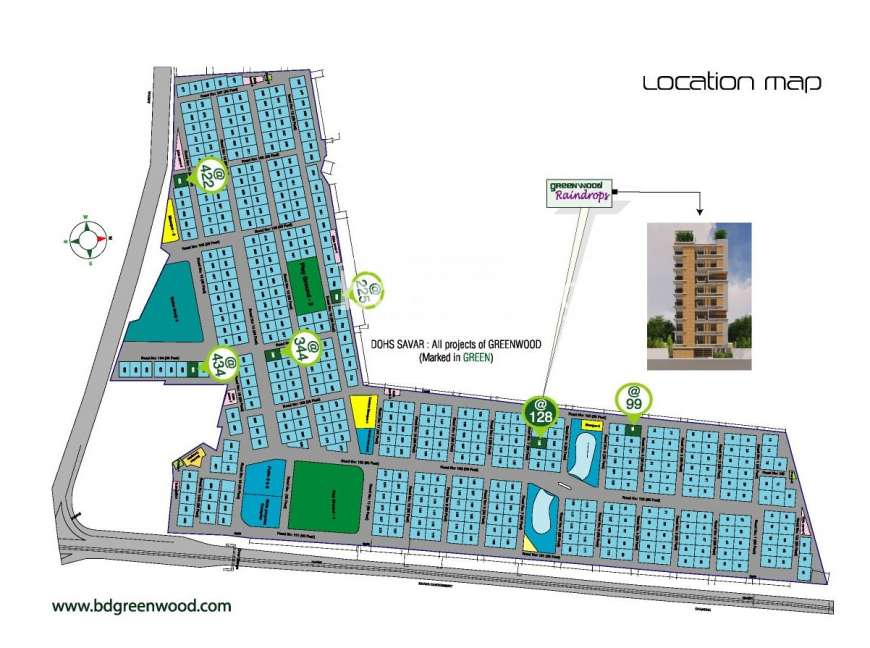
- Interactive map of Savar DOHS
- Coordinates: 23.918°N 90.259°E
- Founder: Savar Cantonment

Area
  - Total: 29.33 ha (72.47 acres)
- Time zone: BST

Savar DOHS (Defence Officers Housing Scheme) is a residential neighborhood for defence service officers located near Savar Cantonment in Ashulia Thana, Savar Upazila, Dhaka, Bangladesh. The DOHS is under the management of Savar Cantonment Board which is headed by Brigadier General Tofail Mostafa Sarwar. The total area of Savar DOHS is 72.47 acres with 445 plots. Brigadier General S M Farhad is the president of Savar DOHS.

On 3 June 2012, Savar DOHS was founded on land previously used by Bangladesh Army for driving instructions.

== Notable places ==
- Sena Public School & College
- National Martyrs' Memorial
- Savar Cantonment
- Sena Shopping Complex
