= Palace of King Harishchandra =

Raja Harishchandra's Palace
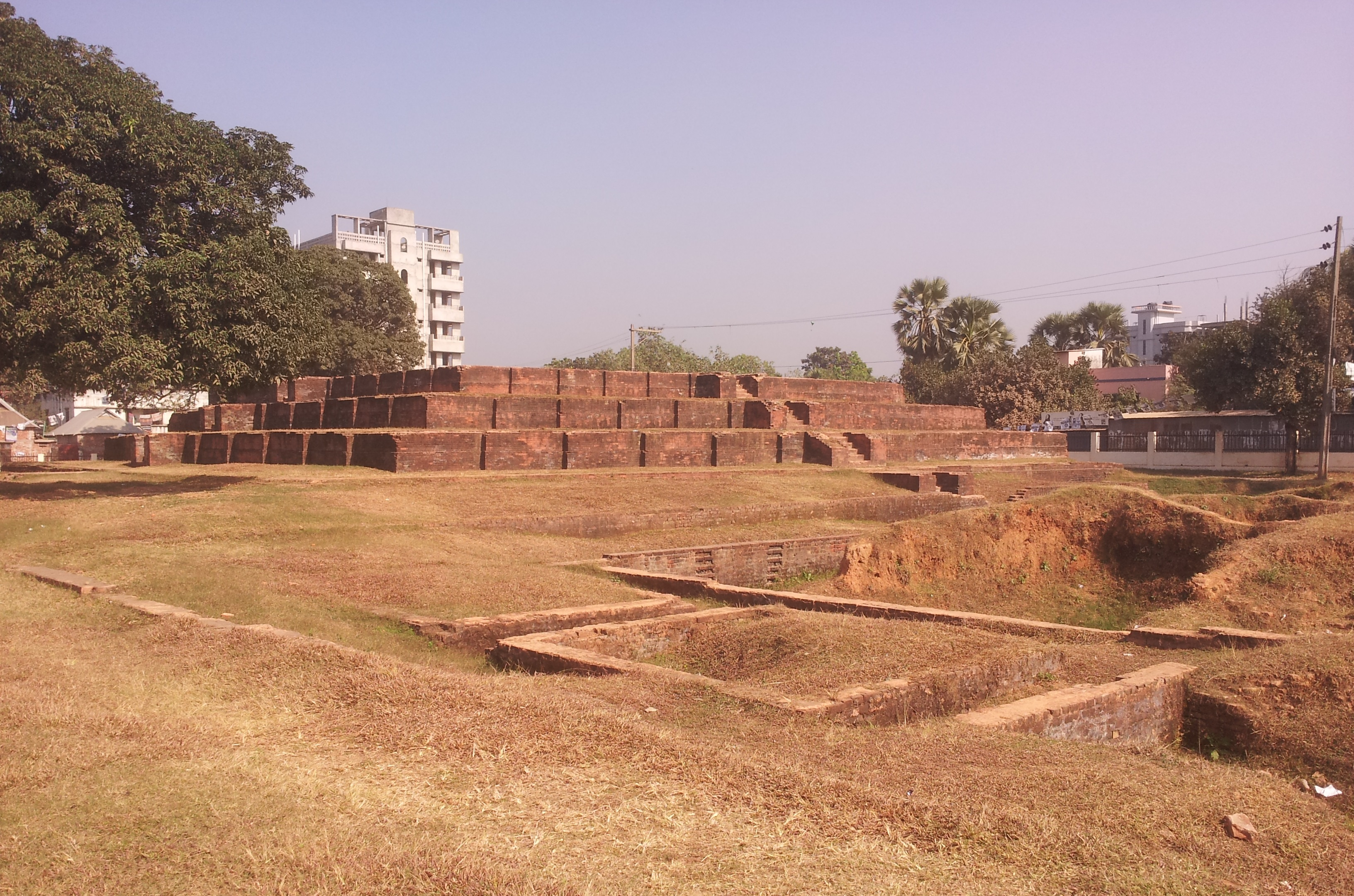
- The ruins of Harishchandra's Palace in Savar Upazila
- Location: Majidpur, Savar Upazila

History
- Built: 7th to 8th Century AD

Site notes
- Area: Dhaka District
- Governing body: Department of Archaeology (Bangladesh)
- Owner: Department of Archaeology (Bangladesh)

The Palace of King Harishchandra is an archaeological site located in Savar Upazila of Dhaka District, Bangladesh . It is also known as "Raja Harishchandra's mound", "his house", or "his residence", etc.

== Location ==
The archaeological site is located in Majidpur (east of Savar Bazar bus stand) of Savar Municipality under Savar Upazila, 24 kilometers away from Gulistan Zero Point in the capital Dhaka.

== Archaeological excavations ==
The palace or mound of King Harishchandra remained buried under the ground until the end of the 19th century. The local people identified this buried place as the Rajbari Dhibi. In 1918, Dr. Nalinikanta Bhattasali conducted an archaeological excavation in the village of Rajasana, near the Rajbari-Dhibi. As a result of this excavation, some artifacts related to Buddhist religion and culture and imitation coins of the Gupta dynasty were discovered. This led to the identification of Buddhist statues there. Based on this, excavations were conducted in the palace dhibi of Raja Harishchandra in 1990-1991.

== Archaeological finds and significance ==
Excavations of the mound of Raja Harishchandra from 1990 to 1991 uncovered a medium-sized obelisk and the ruins of a Buddhist monastery to the south. It is understood that there was a center of Buddhist civilization here in the 7th century AD. The monastery uncovered during the excavations of the palace-mound of King Harishchandra shows signs of multiple reconstructions and multiple floors. Four layers are discernible in the architecture of the monastery. The four-layered structure suggests that it was used for a long time.During excavations, gold and silver coins from the 7th–8th centuries AD and bronze statues of the meditating Buddha and Tantric figures from the 8th–9th centuries AD have been discovered from the upper layers of the monastery. The many bronze statues found here indicate that it was a centre of Mahayana Buddhism. In addition, various types of artifacts have been found here. Sculptures of Lokeshwar-Vishnu wearing dhoti, crown, bangles, necklaces, waist bands and arm bands, lotus water, Dhyan Buddha, Avalokiteshvara and Prajna Paramita have been found here. Considering the artistic style, experts estimate that these artifacts date back to the 7th to 8th centuries AD. These artifacts are currently preserved in the Bangladesh National Museum.

== Historical importance ==
Although Majidpur is not a well-known place in the present day, the region was very important in ancient times. According to various archaeological experts, without any historical doubt, about 24 km northwest of Dhaka (the distance by road from Zero Point, Dhaka) on the left bank of the ancient Bansavati or modern Banshi River, it was the capital of the Sarveshwar kingdom under the rule of Raja Harishchandra of the Mahishya Pala dynasty. The name of this capital was Sarveshwar, and the name Savar was later derived from the name Sarveshwar. In the 7th-8th centuries AD, the palace-residence of Raja Harishchandra of the then Sambhar kingdom was located in Majidpur, Savar. The importance of this area of Savar can also be understood by looking at the mention of the place on Rennell's map. The famous historian and geographer James Rennell surveyed the Savar area in 1767 and created the relevant part of the map.

== See also ==
- Mainamati
- Harishchandra Pal (Savar Pala Dynasty)
