= Valerie Ann Taylor =

British-Bangladeshi physiotherapist and philanthropist

Valerie Ann Taylor OBE
- Born: 8 February 1944 (age 81); Bromley, Kent, England
- Citizenship: United Kingdom; Bangladesh
- Known for: Founder of Centre for the Rehabilitation of the Paralysed
- Parents: William Taylor (father); Marie Taylor (mother)
- Awards: full list

Valerie Ann Taylor, OBE (born 8 February 1944) is a British-Bangladeshi physiotherapist, social worker and philanthropist. She is the founder of Centre for the Rehabilitation of the Paralysed (CRP) in Savar, Dhaka District. Dubbed the Mother Teresa of Bangladesh, she was awarded the 2004 Independence Day Award by the Government of Bangladesh for her public service. In 1998, she was granted Bangladeshi citizenship by the Prime Minister of Bangladesh.

== Early life ==
Taylor was born in Kent, England to Marie Taylor and William Taylor. She grew up living close to National Spinal Injuries Centre at Stoke Mandeville Hospital in England.

== Career ==
In 1969, Taylor arrived in Bangladesh, under contract for 15 months, with the Voluntary Service Overseas (VSO) to work as a physiotherapist at Christian Hospital, Chandraghona, in the Chittagong Hill Tracts. She established the Centre for the Rehabilitation of the Paralysed (CRP) in 1979. At the start of her career, she ran CRP with four patients in an abandoned warehouse of the Shaheed Suhrawardy Hospital. Later, CRP grew to include a 100-bed hospital.

== Personal life ==
Taylor is a legal guardian to two girls with disabilities.

== Awards and honors ==
- Officer of the Order of the British Empire (OBE) (1995)
- Arthur Eyre Brook Gold Medal (1996)
- National Social Service Award (2000)
- Anannya Top Ten Awards (2000)
- Millennium Award (2000)
- Dr. MR Khan and Anwara Trust Gold Medal (2001)
- Hakkani Mission Bangladesh Award (2001)
- Bangladesh Independence Day Award (2004)
- Rokeya Shining Personality Award (2005)
- Princess Diana Gold Medal (2007)
- Mahatma Gandhi Peace Award (2009)
- Lifetime Achievement Award by Hope Foundation for Women & Children of Bangladesh (2009)
- Nova Southeastern University Award (2009)
- Rotary International Award (2013)
- National Environment Award (2020)
