= Savar Upazila =

Savar সাভার
- Upazila
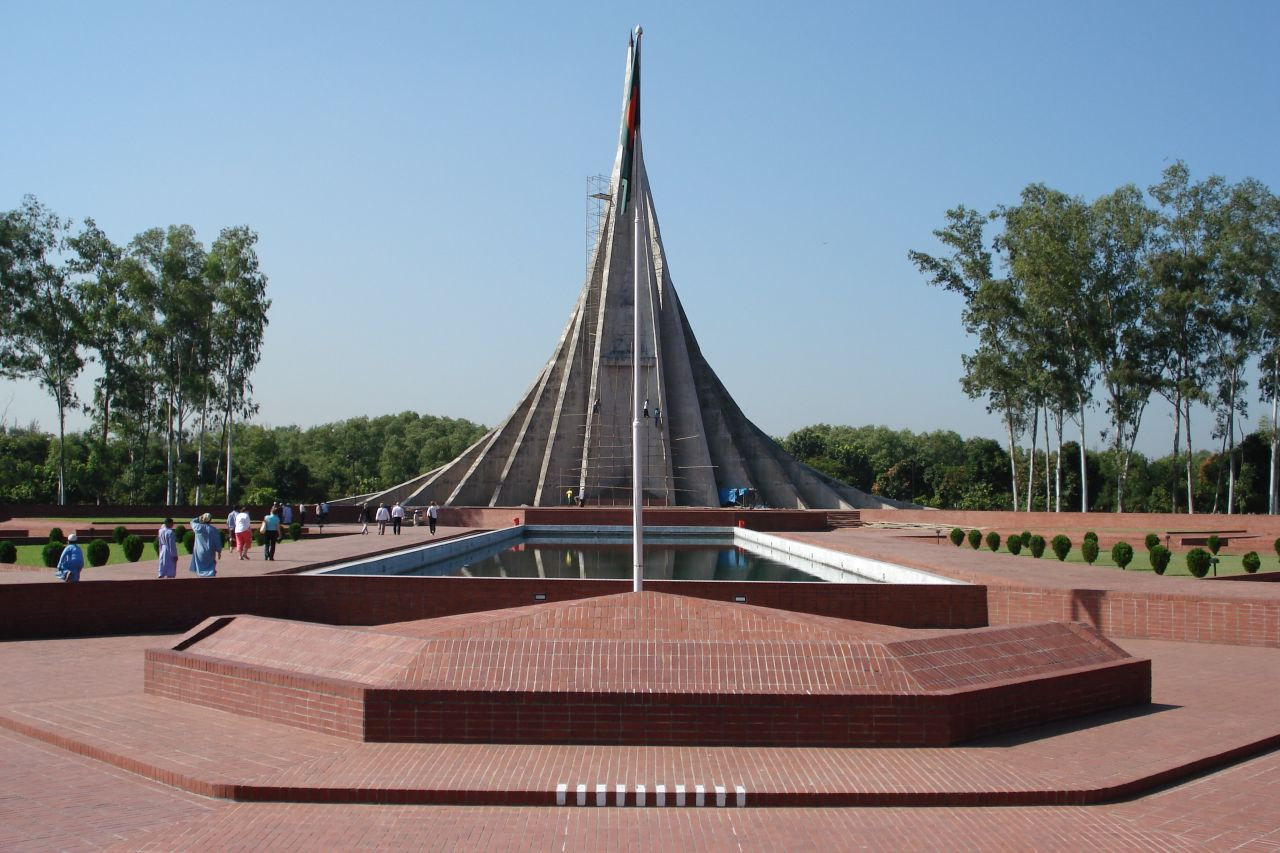
- National Memorial in Savar, Bangladesh

- Coordinates: 23°51′30″N 90°16′00″E
- Country: Bangladesh
- Division: Dhaka
- District: Dhaka
- Jatiya Sangsad constituency: Dhaka-19 and Three union of Dhaka-2
- Headquarters: Savar Upazila Complex

Government
  - Body: Upazila Council

Area
  - Total: 280.11 km^{2} (108.15 sq mi)

Population (2022)
  - Total: 2,311,796
  - Density: 8,253.2/km^{2} (21,376/sq mi)
- Time zone: UTC+6 (BST)
- Postal code: 1340
- Area code: 02
- Website: savar.dhaka.gov.bd

Savar Upazila mauza geocode map

Savar (Bengali: সাভার) is an upazila of Dhaka District in the division of Dhaka, Bangladesh and is located at a distance of about 24 kilometers (15 mi) to the northwest of Dhaka city. Savar is mostly famous for the National Martyrs' Memorial, the national monument for the martyrs of the Liberation War of Bangladesh.

== History ==
The origin of the name Savar is thought to be an evolved version of the ancient 7th–8th-century township of সর্বেশ্বর Shôrbeshshôr ("Lord of everything") or সম্ভার Shômbhar situated on the banks of the river known today as the Bangshi. Shôrbeshshôr, in turn, is said to have been established on the site of the ancient Sambagh Kingdom. Local legends as well as archaeological finds indicate a king by the name of Harishchandra, said to be of the Pala dynasty, ruled over Shôrbeshshôr. There is an old shloka that goes বংশাবতী-পূর্বতীরে সর্বেশ্বর নগরী, বৈসে রাজা হরিশচন্দ্র জিনি সূরপুরী Bôngshaboti-purbotire shôrbeshshôr nôgori, boishe raja Horishchôndro jini shurpuri ("On the East banks of the Bangsabati is the city of Sharbeshvar, lives there King Harishchandra conquering Heaven"). In any case, local legend holds that the childless Harishchandra was succeeded to the throne by his sister Rajeswari's son, Damodar. Damodar's reign started a decline for the kingdom, culminating in the reign of one of his descendants, king Ravan, a music enthusiast. During Ravan's reign, the Koch invaded and sacked the capital established by Harishchandra. However, inscriptions on an undated burnt brick fragment indicate king Mahendra in 869 CE dedicated a matha to his father, saint king Harishchandra, son of king Ranadhirasena, son of king Dhimantasena, son of king Bhimasena. The same inscription also states the Buddhist king Dhimantasena invaded and captured the land between the Bangshi and the Brahmaputra and king Ranadhirasena extended the kingdom to the Himalayas and fixed his residence in the city of Shômbhar.

During the 1971 war, Savar Cantonment (then Ansar Camp) and the then-newly founded Jahangirnagar University were some of the first targets of military swoop outside the capital following Operation Searchlight of 25 March. In December of that year, Savar was the last obstacle before the freedom fighters (led by Kader Siddiqui and others) entered the capital, and the Pakistan army conceded defeat. Days before the end of the war, teenager Golam Dastagir Titu was killed in a direct encounter between the Pakistani Army and the freedom fighters. The compatriots buried him near the main gate of the Central Cattle Breeding & Dairy Farm, Savar. The Bangladeshi Army constructed a memorial monument in his honour.

On 24 November 2012, a garment factory fire killed at least 112 people. The factory-made clothes for US and European companies were faulted for negligent safety standards. Walmart and Sears, two of the companies who contracted work from this factory, refused to compensate victims.

On 24 April 2013, a building in Savar collapsed, killing 1,129 people and injuring around 2,500. The building housed a garment factory that exported clothing to US and European companies. Eighty percent of the workers were women aged 18–20, paid $0.12-$0.26 per hour.

== Geography ==
Savar is located at 23°51′30″N 90°16′00″E / 23.8583°N 90.2667°E / 23.8583; 90.2667. It has 66,956 units of household and a total area of 280.11 square kilometers (108.16 sq mi). It is bounded by Kaliakair and Gazipur Sadar upazilas on the north, Keraniganj Upazila on the south, Mirpur, Mohammadpur, Pallabi, and Uttara thanas of Dhaka City on the east, and Dhamrai and Singair upazilas on the west. The land of the upazila is composed of alluvium soil of the Pleistocene period. The height of the land gradually increases from the east to the west. The southern part of the upazila is composed of the alluvium soil of the Bangshi and Dhalashwari rivers. The main rivers are Bangshi, Turag, Buriganga, and Karnatali. The Bangshi River has become polluted due to industrialization. The total cultivable land measures 16,745.71 hectares (41,379.6 acres), in addition to fallow land of 10,551.18 hectares (26,072.5 acres).

== Demographics ==
Religions in Savar Upazila (2022)
Religion	Percent
Islam	94.90%
Hinduism	4.60%
Christianity	0.38%
Other or not stated	0.12%

According to the 2022 Bangladeshi census, Savar Upazila had 742,699 households and a population of 2,311,796. 7.57% of the population were under 5 years of age. Savar had a literacy rate (age 7 and over) of 84.38%: 86.28% for males and 82.26% for females, and a sex ratio of 110.90 males for every 100 females. 616,517 (26.67%) lived in urban areas.

According to the 2011 Census of Bangladesh, Savar Upazila had 359,084 households and a population of 1,385,910. 243,262 (17.55%) were under 10 years of age. Savar had a literacy rate (age 7 and over) of 68.0%, compared to the national average of 51.8%, and a sex ratio of 876 females per 1000 males. 296,851 (21.42%) lived in urban areas.

The religious breakdown was Muslim 93.85%, Hindu 5.35%, Christian 0.58%, Buddhist 0.20%, others 0.02%, and ethnic minority group nationals numbered 319 including Buno, Garo, Chakma (Sangma), and Burman. The main occupations are Agriculture 24.34%, agricultural labourer 12.84%, wage labourer 4.44%, cattle breeding, forestry and fishing 1.90%, industry 1.37%, commerce 17.35%, service 20.68%, construction 1.66%, transport 3.96% and others 11.46%.

== Economy ==
Agriculture and manufacturing are the two major economic sectors in Savar. The main crops grown here are Paddy, Jute, peanut, onion, garlic, chili, and other vegetables. The extinct or nearly extinct crops in the region are Aus paddy, Asha Kumari paddy, sesame, linseed, kali mator, randhuni saj, mitha saj, kaun, and mas kalai. The main fruits cultivated here are Jackfruit, mango, olive, papaya, guava, kamranga, berry, and banana. There are 181 combined fisheries, dairies, poultries, five hatcheries, 209 poultries, and 1319 fisheries. Manufacturing facilities include Ceramic industry, beverage industry, press and publication, garments industry, foot ware, jute mills, textile mills, printing and dyeing factory, transformer industry, automobile industry, biscuit and bread factory, pharmaceutical industry, soap factory, brickfield, cold storage, welding, plant nursery, etc. Bangladesh Export Processing Zone is located in this upazila. The Cottage industry includes 8 Weaving, 100 goldsmith, and 29 others workshops. The main exports are Jackfruit, papaya, flower, sapling, dairy products, meat, transformer, fabrics, dye, medicine, ready-made garments, electronics and electric goods, shoe, brick, sweetmeat, etc.

Agriculture %	Industry %	Service %
23.6	59.6	16.8

There is 62 km of pucca (first-class), 56 km of semi pucca, 562 km of mud road, and 50 km of highway. Transports used here include the traditional (and extinct or nearly extinct) Palanquin, bullock cart, horse carriage, and modern-day vehicles.

The minimum wage is approximately $9.50 per week or $38 per month.

== Points of interest ==
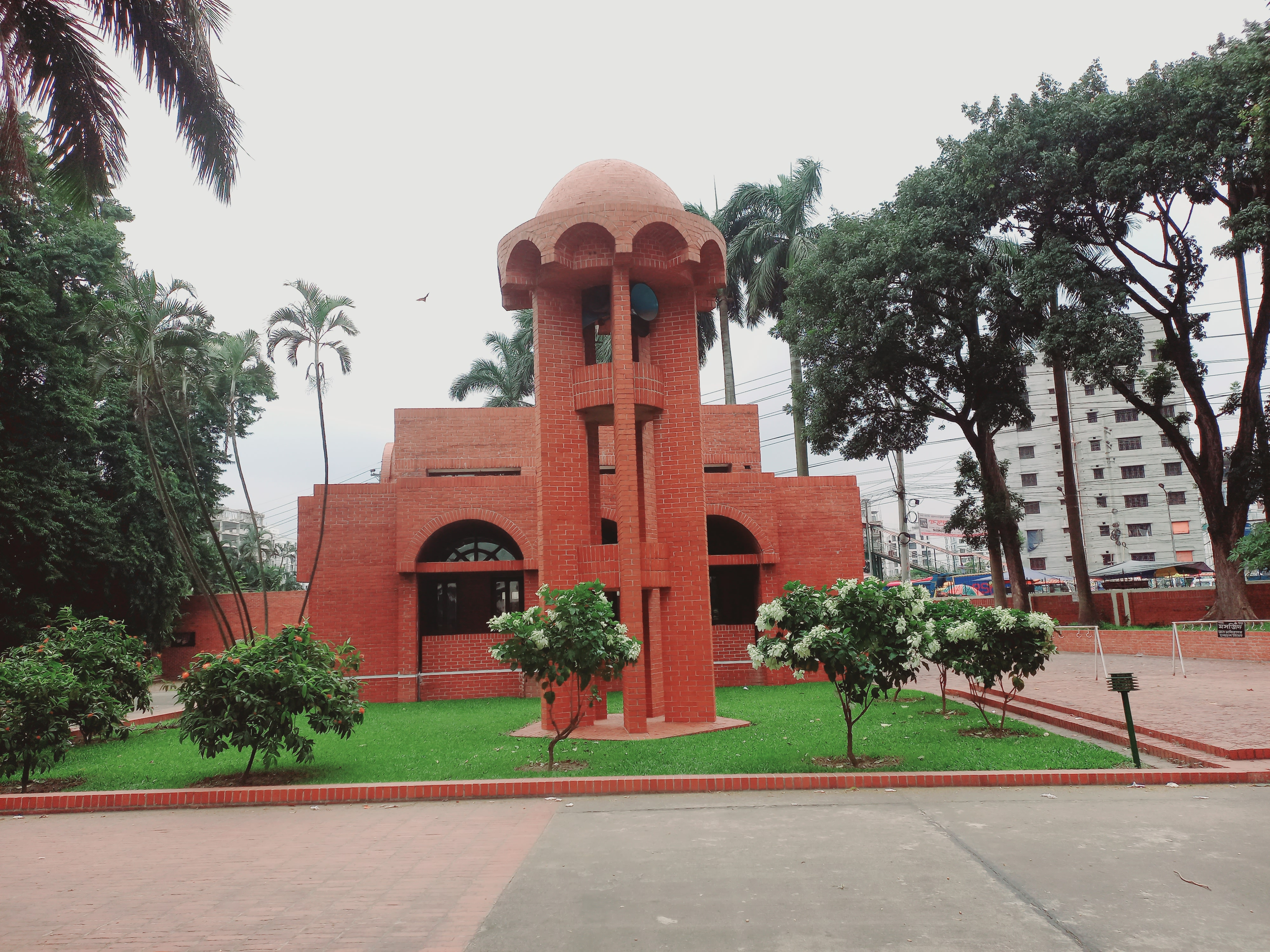
National Martyrs' Monument Jame Masjid in Savar

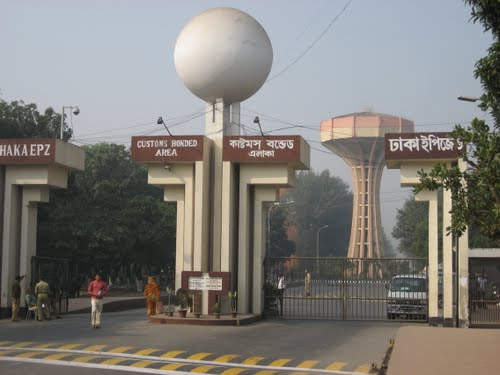
DEPZ

There are so many important installations in Savar, some of them are following -

- National Martyrs' Memorial, the national monument of Bangladesh, is set up in Savar in the memory of those who died in the Bangladesh Liberation War of 1971, which brought independence and separated Bangladesh from Pakistan.
- Atomic Energy Research Establishment is a government nuclear research station in Bangladesh and is located in Savar Upazila, Bangladesh. It is under the control of the Bangladesh Atomic Energy Commission and is the largest installation under the commission.
- Dhaka Export Processing Zone (DEPZ) is located in Savar Upazila and was established in 1993.
- Savar is the home of Jahangirnagar University, a public university of Bangladesh, which is known for its scenery and as a destination for Siberian migratory birds during winter.
- Daffodil International University (DIU), a private university, is located in Daffodil Smart City, Birulia, Savar. The university was established in 2002 and later developed its permanent campus in Savar.
- Centre for the Rehabilitation of the Paralysed (CRP), the nation's only specialized rehabilitation hospital, is located in Savar, about 1 kilometer (0.62 mi) from Savar Bazar.
- The 9th infantry division of Bangladesh Army is garrisoned there in Savar Cantonment.
- Army Institute of Business Administration (Army IBA), a business school run by the Bangladesh Army in affiliation with the Bangladesh University of Professionals, is located in Savar Cantonment, Savar, Dhaka.
- Bangladesh Public Administration Training Centre (BPATC), the only training center for the public service commissioned officers in Bangladesh, is located there.
- Bangladesh Betar's employers' residence - Radio Colony and The Transmission Zone with high power transmission setup is situated in Savar.
- The two largest entertainment theme parks of Bangladesh, namely Fantasy Kingdom and Nondon Park, are also located here. The Fantasy Kingdom is situated in Jamgora Bazar, and Nondon Park is situated in Jirani Bazar.

Some other important establishments of Savar are Satellite Ground Receiving Station (Talibabad), Savar Youth Training Centre, etc.

== Administration ==
Savar Thana was established in 1912 and was turned into an upazila in 1983.

Savar Upazila is divided into Savar Municipality and 13 union parishads: Aminbazar, Ashulia, Banogram, Bhakurta, Birulia, Dhamsona, Kaundia, Pathalia, Savar, Shimulia, Tetuljhora, and Yearpur. The union parishads are subdivided into 220 mauzas and 380 villages.

Savar Municipality is subdivided into nine wards and 57 mahallas.

The area of the town is 24.1 km2. It had a population of 124,885; male 53.03%, female 46.97%; population density per km2 of 5182. Presently, Savar Upazila is divided into two thanas, one is Savar Main, and the other is Ashulia.

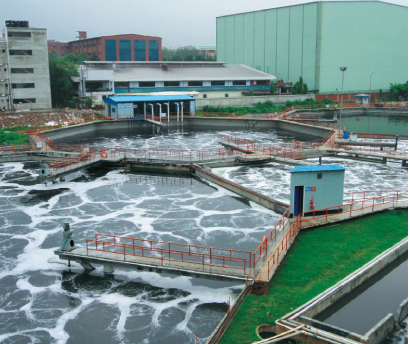
Effluent Treatment plant at Savar

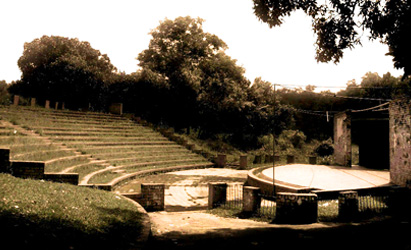
Open theatre at Jahangirnagar University

== Educational institutions ==
The following are some of the notable institutions of Savar

- Radio Colony Model School and College
- Army Institute of Business Administration
- Bangladesh Krira Shikkha Protishtan
- Bangladesh Livestock Research Institute
- Bangladesh Public Administration Training Centre
- Jahangirnagar University
- BRAC University Residential Campus
- Daffodil International University
- City University
- Eastern University
- Asian University of Bangladesh
- Manarat International University
- Enam Medical College and Hospital
- Gono Biswabidyalay
- Atomic Energy Research Establishment (Bangladesh)
- National Institute of Biotechnology
- National Institute of Textile Engineering and Research
- Mirpur mofid-e-um School and College
- Jahangirnagar University school and College
- Savar Cantonment Public School and College
- BPATC School and College
- Morning Glory School and College

=== Social and Cultural Life ===
Savar Upazila features various social and voluntary organizations. According to Banglapedia, there are approximately 81 cooperative societies active in the region. Notable voluntary and social welfare organizations include the Kashful Rural Development & Cultural Organization and the Brotherhood Welfare Development Organization (BWDO).

These organizations are actively involved in community welfare and environmental advocacy. For instance, Kashful has been recognized for its efforts to recover the 'Nayanjali Khal' (canal) from illegal occupation and organizing seminars on social issues.

The Brotherhood Welfare Development Organization (BWDO) (also known as Brotherhood) has gained significant national recognition for its social activities since its inception on 14 April 2016. The organization initiated the "Swabolombi Project" (Self-reliance Project) to provide employment opportunities and support to underprivileged individuals in Savar, which was featured in televised reports by ATN Bangla and Somoy TV. Additionally, its members have been noted for significant campus restoration and sanitation projects at Jahangirnagar University.

The upazila's cultural landscape includes five theatre groups, three music centers, and three film societies. Recreational facilities include a zoo, a golf club, and amusement parks such as Fantasy Kingdom and Nandan Park. Local media and journalism are represented by the Savar Press Club and the Dhaka Journalist Association.

== Notable residents ==
- Keya Payel, actress, was born in Ashulia.
- Amjad Ali Khandaker

== See also ==
- Divisions of Bangladesh
- Districts of Bangladesh
- Upazilas of Bangladesh
