= Ashulia =

Suburb of Dhaka, Bangladesh

Coordinates: 23.897313°N 90.330770°E

- Formation: 2002
- Headquarters: Baipayl, Ashulia, Dhaka, Bangladesh
- Police Super: Matiur Rahman

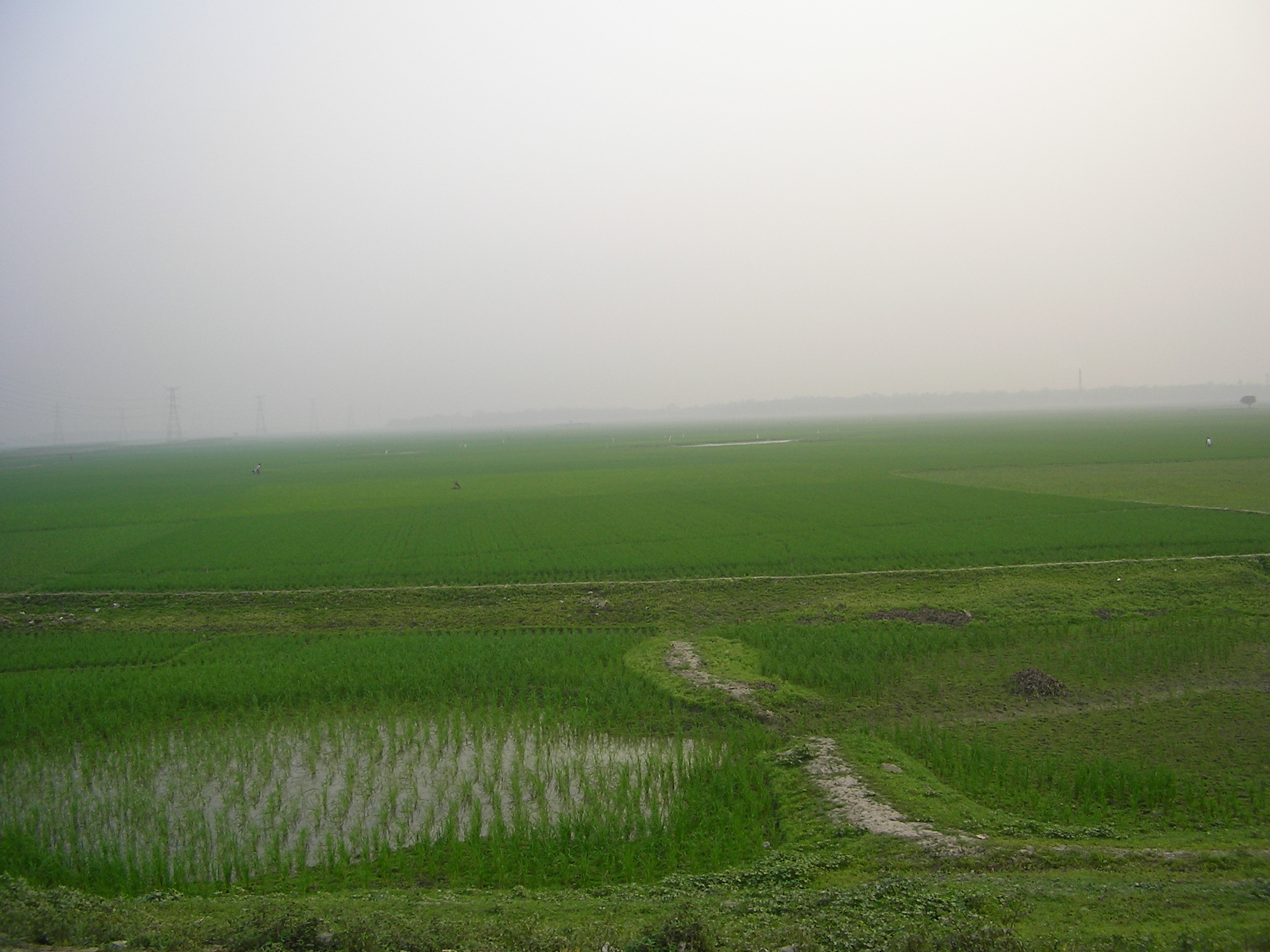
Paddy field of Ashulia

Ashulia (Bengali: আশুলিয়া) is a suburban area near Dhaka, the capital city of Bangladesh. Nearby areas are Savar, Savar DOHS, and Tongi. The attractive view of Ashulia lake and vast paddy fields of Ashulia makes it a popular tourist spot. Two major theme parks of Bangladesh namely Fantasy Kingdom and Nandan Park are also located at Ashulia. A thana (political subdivision) under Dhaka district has been established here in the recent years.

Environmentalists and some non-governmental organizations in Bangladesh have expressed concern over rapid urbanization of Ashulia specially in the context of ongoing real estate development projects in the area. The most affected city around Dhaka is now Ashulia. Most of Ashulia is now owned by the garment factories or land developers. In recent years, it has lost most of its farmland because of the bricks field business.

Schools in the area include Gazirchat Akbar Mandal High School and College.

== Notable places ==
- Bangladesh Krira Shikkha Protisthan
- BKSP Public School & College, Savar, Dhaka.
- Daffodil International University
- Dhaka EPZ
- Fantasy Kingdom, Ashulia, Dhaka.
- Nandan Park, Bararipara, Ashulia, Dhaka.
- Savar DOHS
- Savar Cantonment
- Ashulia Lake
- National Martyrs' Memorial
- Baipayl Bashundhara Residential Area
- Chandreema Cinema Hall
- Savar Sena Auditorium
- Palli Food Village
- BEXIMCO Industrial Park
- BEXIMCO PPE Industrial Park
- Dhaka University Teacher’s Housing Project
- Bangladesh Betar
- Walton High-Tech Industries
