= Savar Cantonment Public School and College =

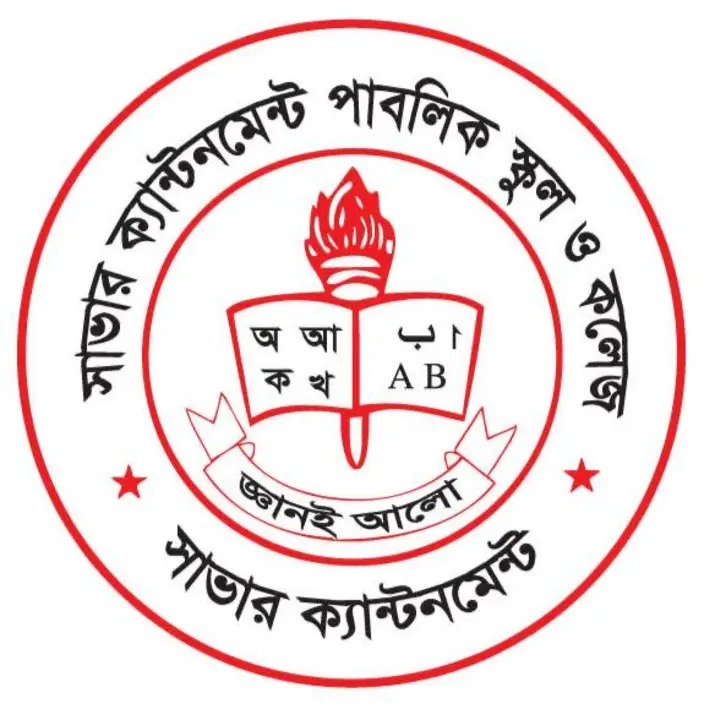
- SCPSC

Location
- Savar Cantonment; Savar, Dhaka, 1344; Bangladesh; 23.9071°N 90.2669°E

Information
- Type: Public
- Motto: জ্ঞানই আলো (Knowledge is Light)
- Established: 1977
- School district: Dhaka
- Superintendent: Bangladesh Army
- School number: 108459
- School code: 1527
- Principal: Colonel Abu Naser
- Enrollment: 4,560
- Language: Bangla and English
- Campus size: 17 acres (6.9 ha)
- Campus type: Permanent
- Colors: Red, Blue, Green, and Yellow.
- Newspaper: উন্মেষ(বার্ষিক)
- Website: scpsc.edu.bd

Savar Cantonment Public School and College (Bengali: সাভার ক্যান্টনমেন্ট পাবলিক স্কুল ও কলেজ) is situated at Savar Cantonment in Savar, Dhaka, Bangladesh. The institution is under the supervision of the director of Bangladesh Army Education Corps.

== See also ==
- Ispahani Public School & College
- Adamjee Cantonment College
