= Amjad Ali Khandaker =

Bangladeshi cameraman

- Born: 1943 (age 82–83); Harirampur Upazila, Manikganj District
- Known for: Camera, recording, and Videography
- Awards: Ekushey Padak (2022)

Amjad Ali Khandkar is a Bangladeshi cameraman and videographer of the Bangladesh Television. He is known for recording the speech delivered on 7 March 1971 by Sheikh Mujibur Rahman. He was awarded the 2022 Ekushey Padak for his contributions to the Liberation War.

== Career ==
Amjad Ali was born in Harirampur Upazila of Manikganj. Currently, he lives in Genda area of Savar Upazila.

In 1968, he got a job in the film division of the Film Development Corporation of the Ministry of Information. In 1971, he recorded the March 7 speech on the instructions of the then director of the film division, Abul Khair. On the day of Bangabandhu's homecoming, he went to house Dhanmondi 32 and filmed. He also filmed the death scene of Sayera Khatun. On 29 June 2004, he retired as Controller-Chief Cameraman of Bangladesh Television.

== Speech delivered on 7 March 1971 ==
On 7 March 1971, Bangabandhu's desired speech was banned on radio and television. Ignoring that ban, some people recorded and saved the speech. One of them is Amjad Ali Khandkar of Savar. In 1971, he was an assistant cameraman in the film department. In 1971, some of them recorded Bangabandhu's 7 March speech. After the recording, the recorded film of the speech was kept in the office that night. As there was no lab in the office at that time, the film was printed from FDC. After the Pakistani attack on 25 March, director Abul Khair called him on 9 April and asked him to take a black 42-inch trunk (box) out of Dhaka. In that trunk were some photographs of Bangabandhu and a video cassette of his 7 March speech. He took that trunk and went out through the second gate of the secretariat with the help of a Bengali officer. He risked his life and reached Swarighat in front of the Pakistan Army. He crossed the river with the trunk. After he reached Jinjira, he climbed on the roof of a bus from the bus stand and got down to a bus stand in Buxganj. As there was no vehicle there, he lifted the trunk on a horse and walked himself to Majid Darogar's house, which is about 4 to 5 kilometers away, in Joypara village of Dohar thana and kept the trunk. In the meantime, as the Pakistani army had reached Doha, they hid the trunk inside the big paddy field of two brothers named Amed Khan and Danesh Khan of Charkosha village further from Doha. Later, Abul Khair went to India and contacted the Indian High Commission and Mukti Bahini and he took the trunk from that paddy field and sent it to India through Mukti Bahini. The video cassette of Bangabandhu's March 7 speech was in India during the liberation war. After the independence of the country, when Abul Khair returned to the country, he brought it with him.
