= Centre for the Rehabilitation of the Paralysed =

Disability organization based in Bangladesh

Centre for the Rehabilitation of the Paralysed পক্ষাঘাতগ্রস্থদের পুনর্বাসন কেন্দ্র
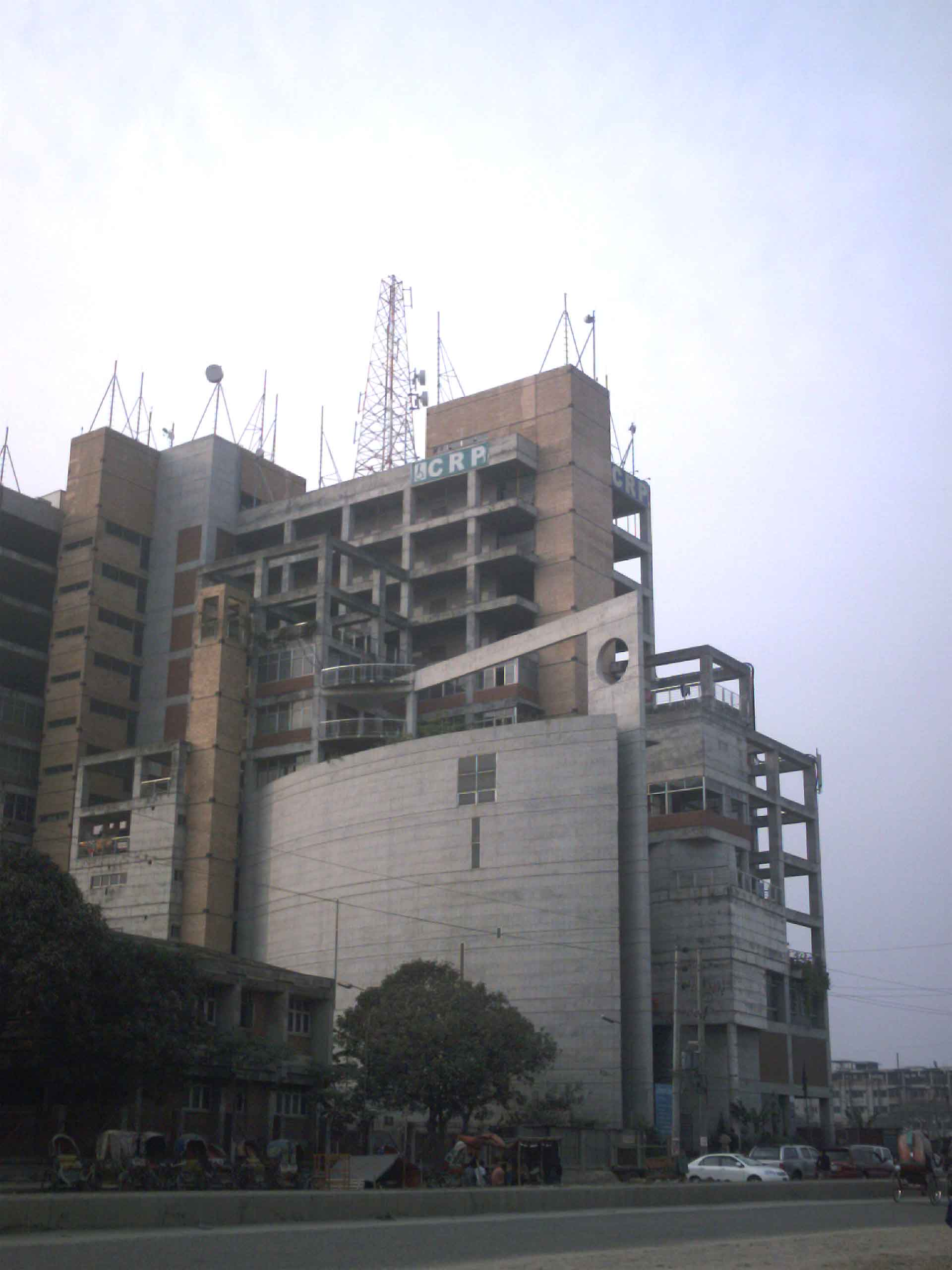
- Abbreviation: CRP
- Formation: 1979
- Type: Non-governmental organization
- Purpose: Rehabilitation of the paralysed
- Headquarters: Savar, Bangladesh
- Region served: Bangladesh
- Official language: Bengali
- Founder: Valerie Ann Taylor
- Website: www.crp-bangladesh.org

The Centre for the Rehabilitation of the Paralysed (CRP; Bengali: পক্ষাঘাতগ্রস্থদের পুনর্বাসন কেন্দ্র) is a non-governmental organization in Bangladesh dedicated to the rehabilitation of individuals with paralysis. It is located in Savar, Bangladesh.

== History ==
The Centre for the Rehabilitation of the Paralysed was established on 11 December 1979 by Valerie Ann Taylor. Taylor, a British national, came to Bangladesh on an aid mission. Initially located in disused warehouses of the Shaheed Suhrawardy Medical College & Hospital, the center was relocated to Savar in 1990. It currently operates a hundred-bed hospital.
