= City University (Bangladesh) =

Private university of Bangladesh

- সিটি ইউনিভার্সিটি
- Other name: CTU
- Motto: Creating a Culture of Excellence
- Type: Private
- Established: 2002
- Affiliations: UGC
- Chairman: Ahasanul Islam Titu
- Chancellor: President Mirza Fakhrul Islam Alamgir
- Vice-Chancellor: Md Lutfor Rahman
- Academic staff: 213 (2021)
- Administrative staff: 146
- Students: 5,530
- Undergraduates: 5,314
- Postgraduates: 216
- Location: Khagan, Birulia, Savar, Dhaka, Bangladesh; 23.87280°N 90.30951°E
- Campus: Urban, 40.1 hectares (99.1 acres)
- Language: English
- Colors: Red, white and golden
- Website: cityuniversity.ac.bd

City University (Bengali: সিটি ইউনিভার্সিটি) is a private university in Savar, Bangladesh. It was established in 2002. The university offers undergraduate and master's degrees in the fields of business administration, mechanical engineering, computer science and engineering, textile engineering, electrical & electronics engineering, civil engineering, pharmacy, agriculture, law, English, etc.

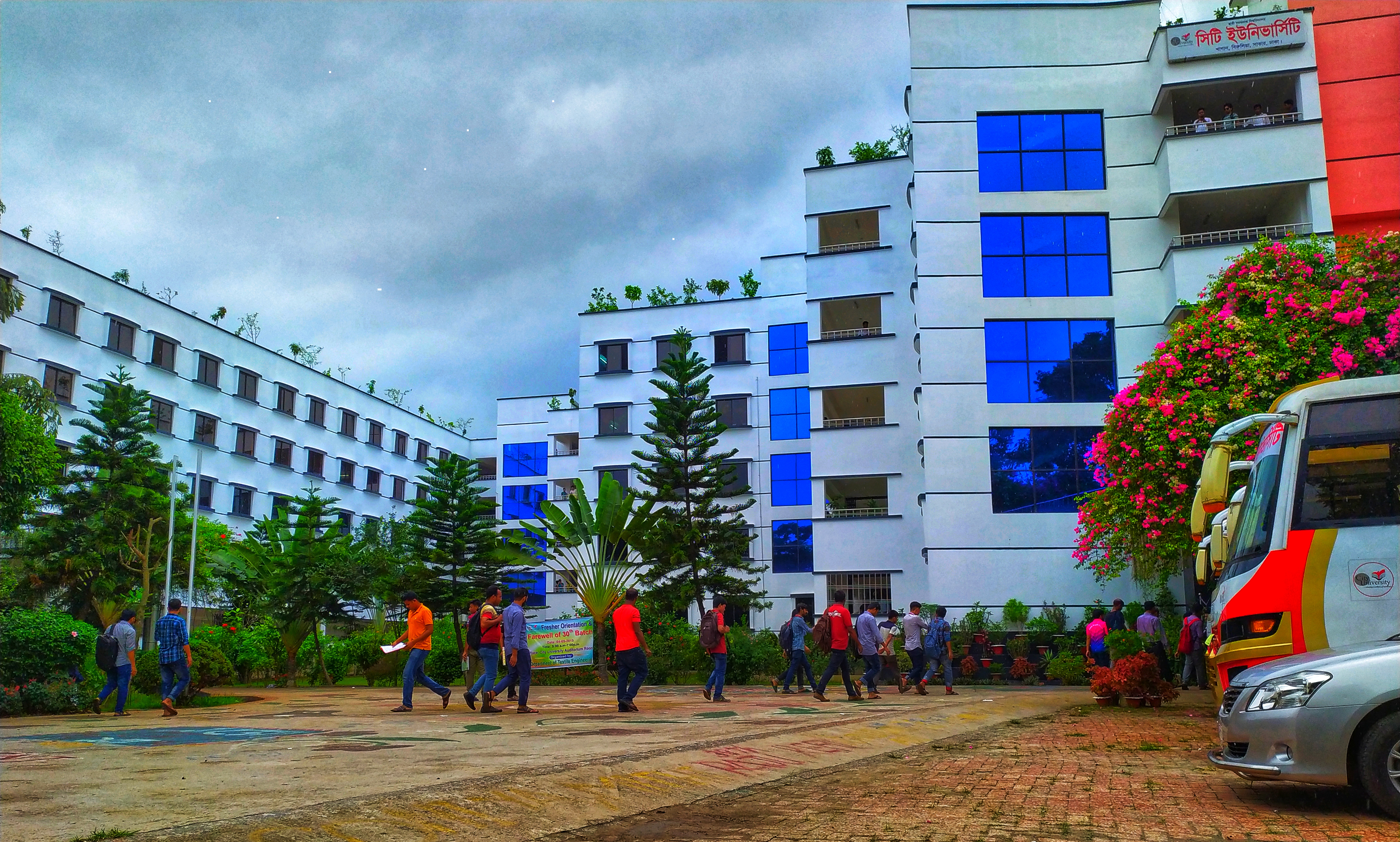
Academic Building, Ashulia Campus

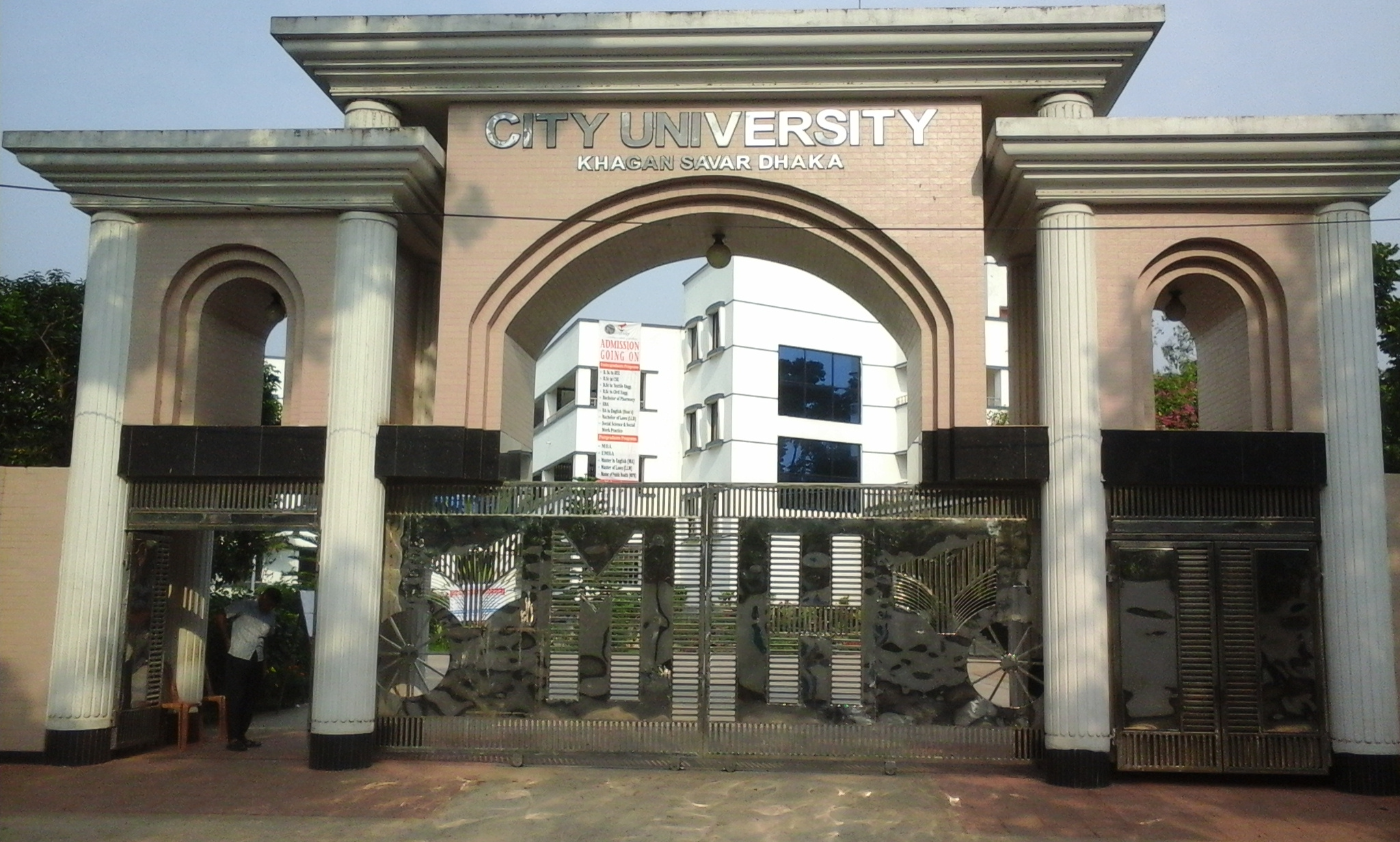
Main gate of City University

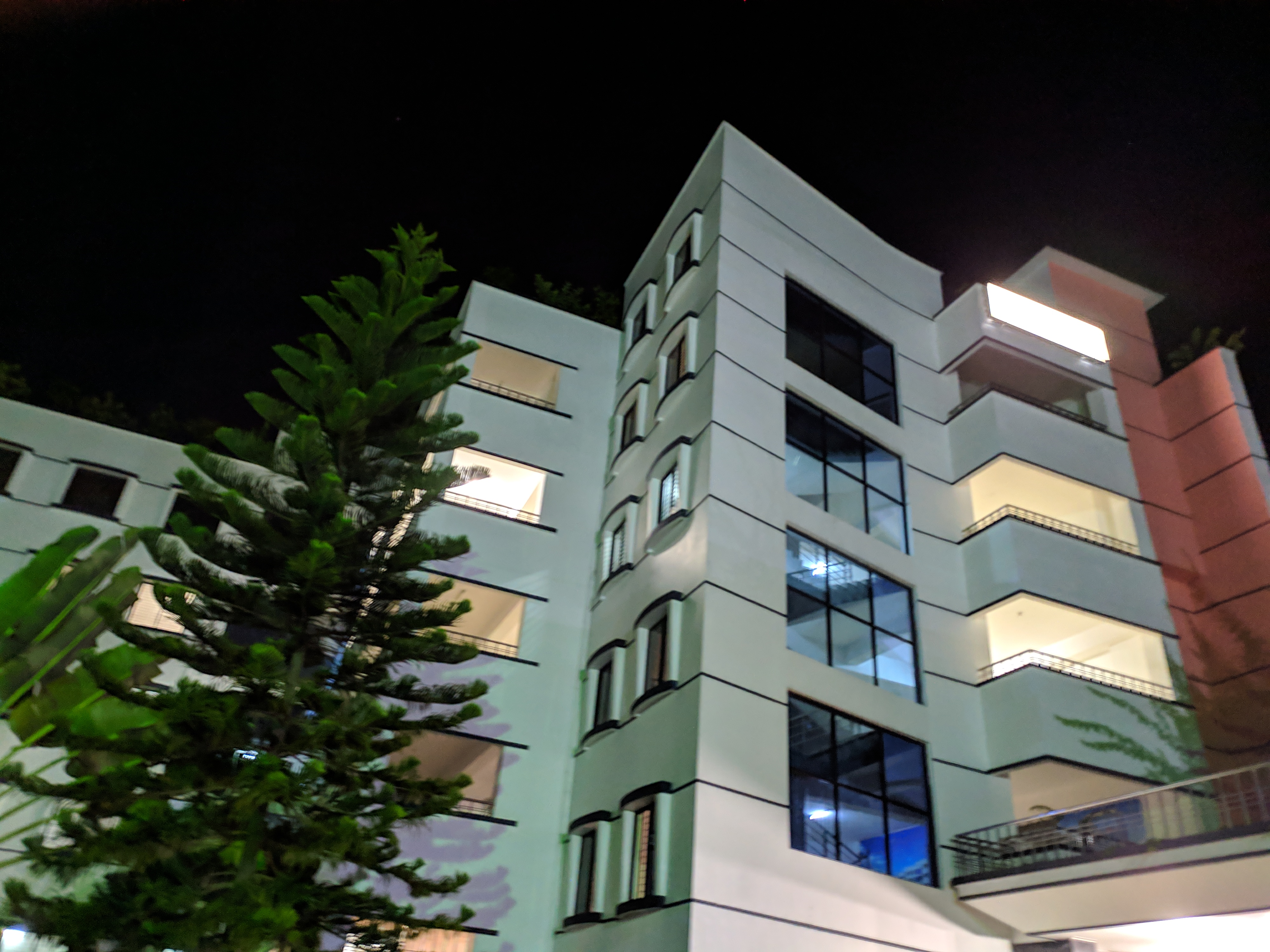
City University night view

== History ==
The university was founded in 2002 in the Blue Ocean Tower, with the approval of the University Grants Commission of Bangladesh and the Government of Bangladesh's Ministry of Education. City University got the Permanent Certificate from Ministry of Education of the Government of the People's Republic of Bangladesh on 23 October 2013.

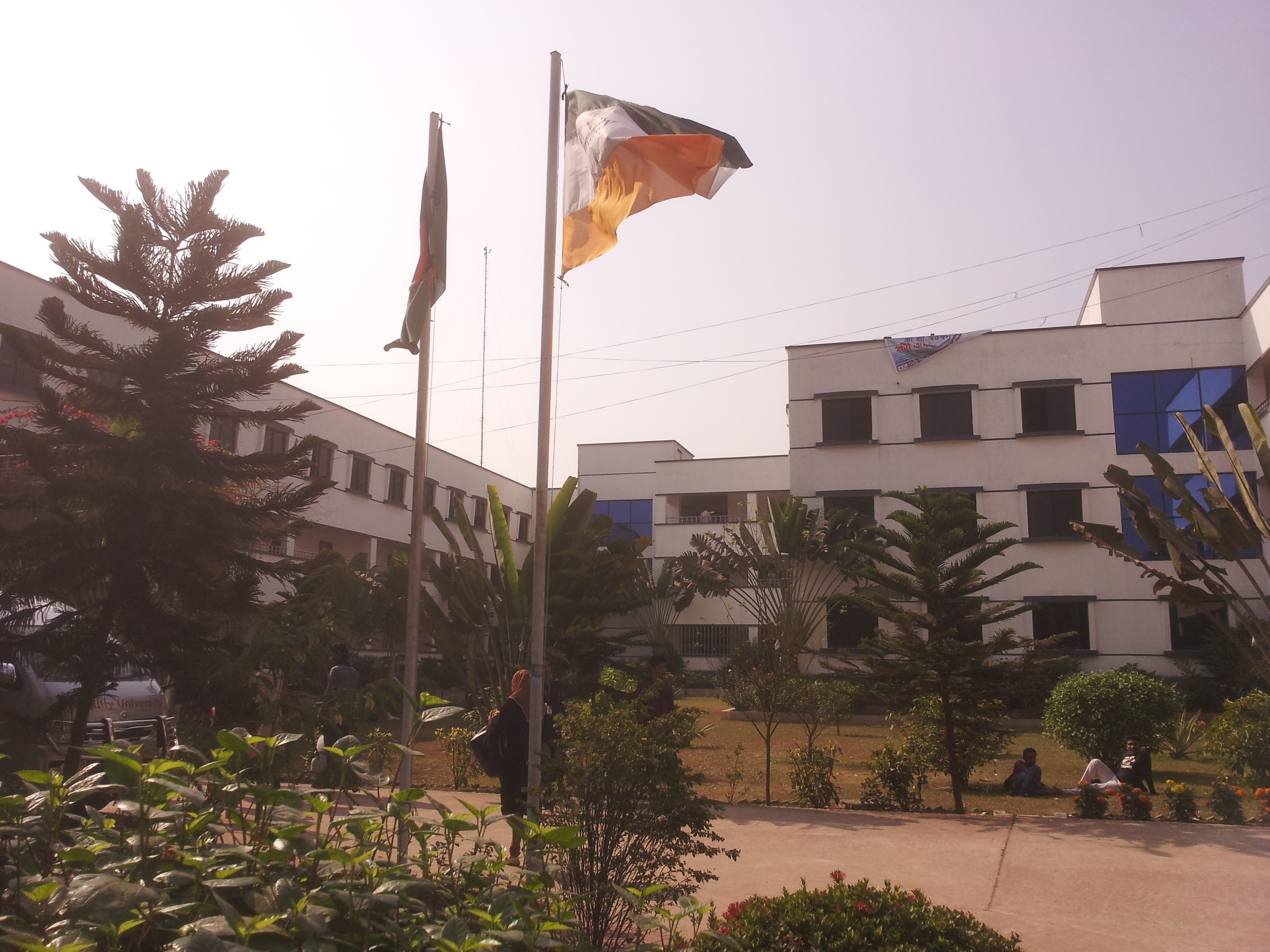
City University permanent campus.

The university started with the Department of Computer Science and Engineering and School of Business where they offered a Bachelor of Science and Engineering (CSE), Masters and Bachelor of Business Administration (MBA and BBA) and later grew with the addition of Department of English, Textiles Engineering and Mechanical Engineering, civil engineering, pharmacy, agriculture with the approval of the University Grants Commission.

In October 2025, the university campus was vandalized, with buses set on fire.

=== Permanent campus ===
The permanent campus is in Khagan, Birulia, Savar in Dhaka District. City University started its permanent campus in 2011. The permanent campus covers 60 acres (24 ha) with a playground, cafeteria, golf course, girls' and boys' hostel, and other facilities.

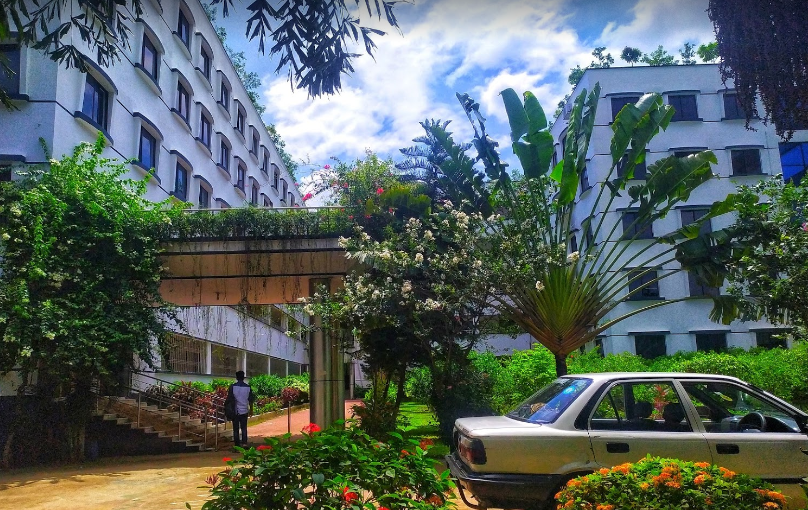
Inside of City University permanent campus.

== Academic semesters ==
=== Four month trimester ===
- Fall : January to April
- Spring : May to August
- Summer : September to December

=== Six month semester ===
- Spring : January to June
- Fall : July to December

== Academics program ==
- Bachelor of Computer Science & Engineering (BCSE)
- Bachelor of Science in Mechanical Engineering (BSME)
- Bachelor of Science in Textile Engineering (BSTE)
- Bachelor of Science in Electrical and Electronics Engineering (EEE)
- Bachelor of Science in Civil Engineering (CE)
- Bachelor of Science in Agriculture (Hon's)
- Bachelor of Pharmacy
- Bachelor of Business Administration (BBA)
- Bachelor of Arts in English
- LL.B. (Hons)
- Master of Laws (LL.M.)
- MBA REGULAR
- Executive MBA
- MA in English

=== Faculties and departments ===
The university consists of 4 Faculties and 10 Departments.

1. Faculty of Science & Engineering

- Department of Computer Science & Engineering
- Department of Science in Mechanical Engineering
- Department of Science in Textile Engineering
- Department of Science in Electrical and Electronics Engineering
- Department of Science in Civil Engineering
- Department of Pharmacy

2. Faculty of Business & Economics

- Department of Business Administration

3. Faculty of Arts & Social Science

- Department of English
- Department of Law

4. Faculty of Agriculture

- Department of Agriculture

In addition to academic work, opportunities for co-curricular and extracurricular activities abound for students.

== Publications ==
The university publishes two journals: Alok Bicchuron and AloKon.

== Vice chancellor and chairman ==
The current vice chancellor is Brigadier general Md Lutfor Rahman (Retd).

=== List of vice chancellors ===
- Brigadier general Md Lutfor Rahman (Retd) (2023–present)
- Shah-E-Alam
- Dr. N R M Borhan Uddin

=== List of chairman ===
- Alhaz Moqbul Hossain (06 August 2002 – 24 May 2020)
- Ahasanul Islam Titu (25 May 2020 – present)
