= Harishchandra Pal (Savar Pala Dynasty) =

Harishchandra Pala (Savar Pala Dynasty)
- Raja Harishchandra
- Cause of death: War with Dharma_Pala of Kamrup
- Era: 10th century CE - 11th Century CE
- Predecessor: Raja Ranadhisen (Pala branch)
- Successor: Damodar Pala
- Family: Pala Dynasty

Raja Harish Pala or Harishchandra Pala was a historical monarch, who ruled the ancient city of Sarveshwar or modern-day Savar in the Dhaka District of Bangladesh, during between the 10th to 11th centuries CE. This period coincided with the post-Gupta era, a time marked by regional dynasties and the flourishing of Buddhist culture in Bengal.

== Background ==
Although, the exact details of Harishchandra's background remains unclear but it is generally accepted that he belonged to a cadet branch of the Pala Dynasty. His ancestors had migrated from the hinterlands of Pala territory, Gauḍa, to Barendra in Eastern Bengal. Most historians hold him to be the great grandson or grandson of Rajyapala. In the early part of the 10th century, he came to Savar and established a kingdom there. Discussing from where he came to Savar, it is assumed that when the Barendra region slipped from the hands of the Pala king Vigrahapala II in 973 CE and was conquered by the Kambojas, who were referred to as 'unauthorized' rulers, during this time of great crisis for Gauda, when Vigrahapala II was hiding in a secluded corner of the Gauda kingdom, possibly in Magadha or Mithila the Chandela king Yashovarman's descendant Dhanga attacked Anga and Rarh in 1002 CE, devastating the entire region.

It is very likely that during this time, Harishchandra left Gauda and came to Savar, where he established a small independent kingdom. When the Pala dynasty was on the verge of collapse, the royal descendants took refuge in the water-surrounded, secure areas of East Bengal, as mentioned earlier. Harishchandra is said to have left Gauda and founded his kingdom in Savar.

== Biography ==
While Raja Harishchandra's exact lineage remains uncertain. and hold him as a descendant of the early Pala dynasty, known for its patronage of Buddhism. Additionally, historical accounts mention that King Govindachandra of the Chandra dynasty married two daughters of Harishchandra Pal, indicating his prominence in the region's political landscape.

During his reign, Sarveshwar was among the most powerful states of Bengal and being its Raja Harishchandra was one of the most powerful ruling monarchs of the time. He fought multiple wars with the neighbouring Kingdoms and even managed to subjugate them completely and reduced some of them to vassalage. He waged major wars with dynasties such as the Khadga dynasty and the Deva dynasty.

At a distance of 7 to 8 miles from the centre of Harish Pal's Palace, in the easternmost village of Ramganj, in the Rajpur district, there is a stupa known as "8 Harishpat". The name of the village and the local proverbs and ruins bear witness to the past glory of Harishchandra. Dr. Grierson, an Archaeologist, has conjectured that this stupa is the burial place of Harishchandra. "The stupa has been demolished and its contents removed, but a large section still exists on the upper part, enjoying the glory of its unique position in a vast plain."

== Folk stories ==
The story of a king named Harishchandra or Harish Raja is recorded in Sahadeva Chakravarti's Dharshamangala. It describes the blasphemy of King Harichandra or Harish Raja, the king's going to the forest with his wife due to his sonlessness, the worship of gods and goddesses, the king's death due to thirst in the forest, the queen's conversion to religion, the king's rise to power due to the grace of religion, the birth of Loichandra in the queen's womb on the wedding of Rakshash Dhartha. The beheading of Loichandra by the King and the Queen on the request of their Guru. The cooking of the infants meat, the sacrifice of life of Loichandra on the request of the Brahmin Guru etc. But later the Prince Loichandra came back to life by the boon of the Guru. Manik Ganguli's and Ghanram's Dharmamangal also contain accounts of the sacrifice of sons for the sake of religion, but this entire subject is not mentioned in the Shunna Purana.

== Kingdom of Sarveshwar ==
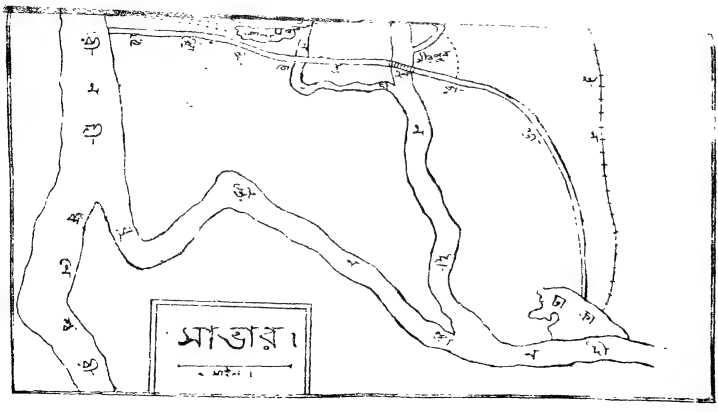
Map of the Savar 1

On the eastern bank of the Banshi river and Bhamsavati rivers, there was the city of Sarveshwar. Whose King was Raja Harishchandra. At that time, his kingdom was full of happiness and peace. Today's Savar is the ruin of this happy kingdom of Sarveshwar. According to some historians, the name of the capital of the Sarveshwar kingdom of the famous Pala dynasty scion Raja Harishchandra was Sarveshwar, and the name Savar originated from the name Sambhar.

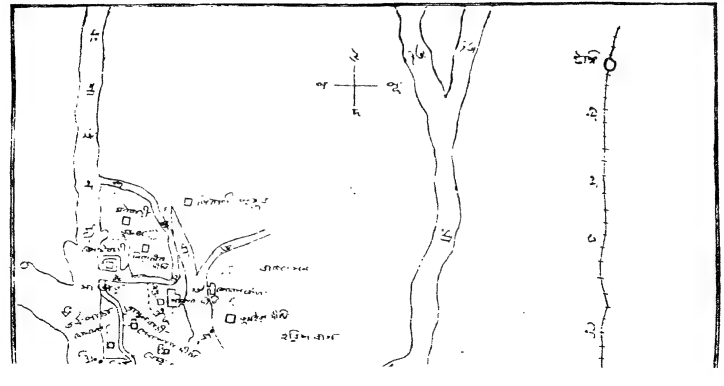
Map 2 of Savar Nagari

The Palace of Raja Harishchandra is buried under the ground in a neglected corner of Rajashan village, east of Savar. Around Rajashan, many almost extinct ponds, Buddhist architectural monuments such as gardens, canals, and ditches still stand as witnesses of time. The King's cantonment, Kothabari, is located north of Savar. Karnapara, named after one of King Harishchandra's queens, Karnavati, and Rajphulbaria, named after another queen, Phuleshwari, are located one mile south of Savar.

The site was first excavated in 1918 by Dr. Nalinikanta Bhattasali, revealing artifacts linked to Buddhist culture and imitation Gupta Dynasty coins. He writes "Savar is a historical place, the traditional capital of Raja Harishchandra. It stands on the east bank of Bangshi River which is branch of the Brahmaputra River and falls into Dhaleshwari at a place south of Savar".

== Death ==
When the King of Kamarupa, Dharmapala, attacked the kingdom of Govindachandra, the son of Queen Mainamati of the Chandra dynasty of Bikrampur. Raja Harishchandra is believed to have fought alongside his son-in-law's allied forces against Dharmapala and was defeated. He is believed to have lost his life in the conflict.

== Artifacts found ==
images of the artifacts recovered through excavation

- The inscriptions of Savar
- Artifacts recovered through excavation

== Genealogy ==
Sl no.	King's name	Queen	Children
1.	Harishchandra Pala	Karnabati and Fuleswari	Daughter- Adwainyamala (Aduna) and Padmamala (Paduna); Son - Damodar (Adopted son)

The two regions, Karnapara and Rajfulbariya, were named after King Harishchandra's two wives, Karnabati and Fuleshwari, respectively. As Raja Harishchandra Pal had no son, his nephew Damodar was adopted as a son and assumed responsibility for the Savar kingdom.

King's name	About
Damodar Pala	He was the son of Raja Harischandra's sister Rajeswari, later he was adopted by the king.
Shibchandra Ray	10th descendant of Raja Harischandra Pala. Shibchandra Ray set out for Kashi on a pilgrimage and renounced his kingdom. After King Sibchandra, the Savar kingdom began to fall into ruin due to external invasions and the royal family migrated to a place called Kondagarh kshetra.
Taruraj Khan	11th descendant of Raja Shibchandra, during the reign of Mughal general Man Singh, he became the Faujdar of the Hooghly district as his associate and received the title 'Khan'. Taruraj Khan had four sons - Suvaraj, Yuvaraj, Buddhimanta and Bhagyabanta.
Bhagyabanta Chowdhury	In his last life he adopted the Islam and he was known as 'Khandakar' but some of Bhagyabanta's descendants still practice Hinduism and his tomb is still famous as 'Khandakar's Dargah'. A village in Konda village has been named Bhagyavantapara after him. Bhagyabanta's descendant Yashabanta live near the Yasobantapara who was served as a Dewan of Dhaka.
Buddhimanta Chowdhury	Brother of Bhagyabanta and the Zamindar of Sonabaria area.
Mrityunjay Chowdhury	

== Relation with Chandra dynasty ==
According to the history of Savar and Patikara, the dynasty had marital relationship with the Chandra dynasty. King Govindachandra of the Chandra dynasty was married to two daughters of King Harishchandra, Adhuna and Padhuna. In the folk song Mainamatir gaan, there is also a reference to Harishchandra gave his daughter Adhuna in marriage to Govindachandra and also gave his second daughter, Padhuna, as part of the dowry.

== See also ==
- Pala Dynasty
- Dharmamangal
- Palace of King Harishchandra

== Gallery ==
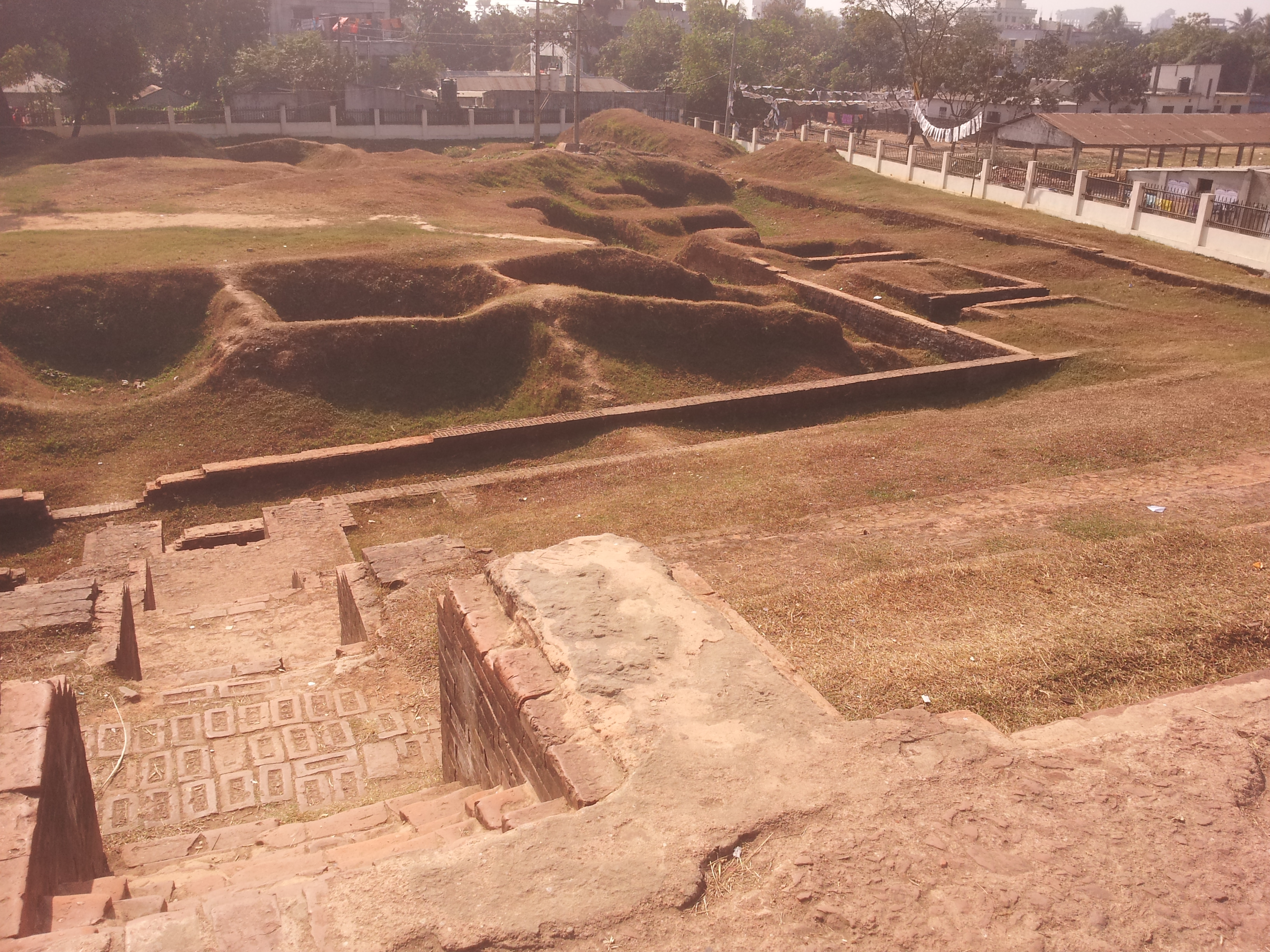
Harishchandra Palace view

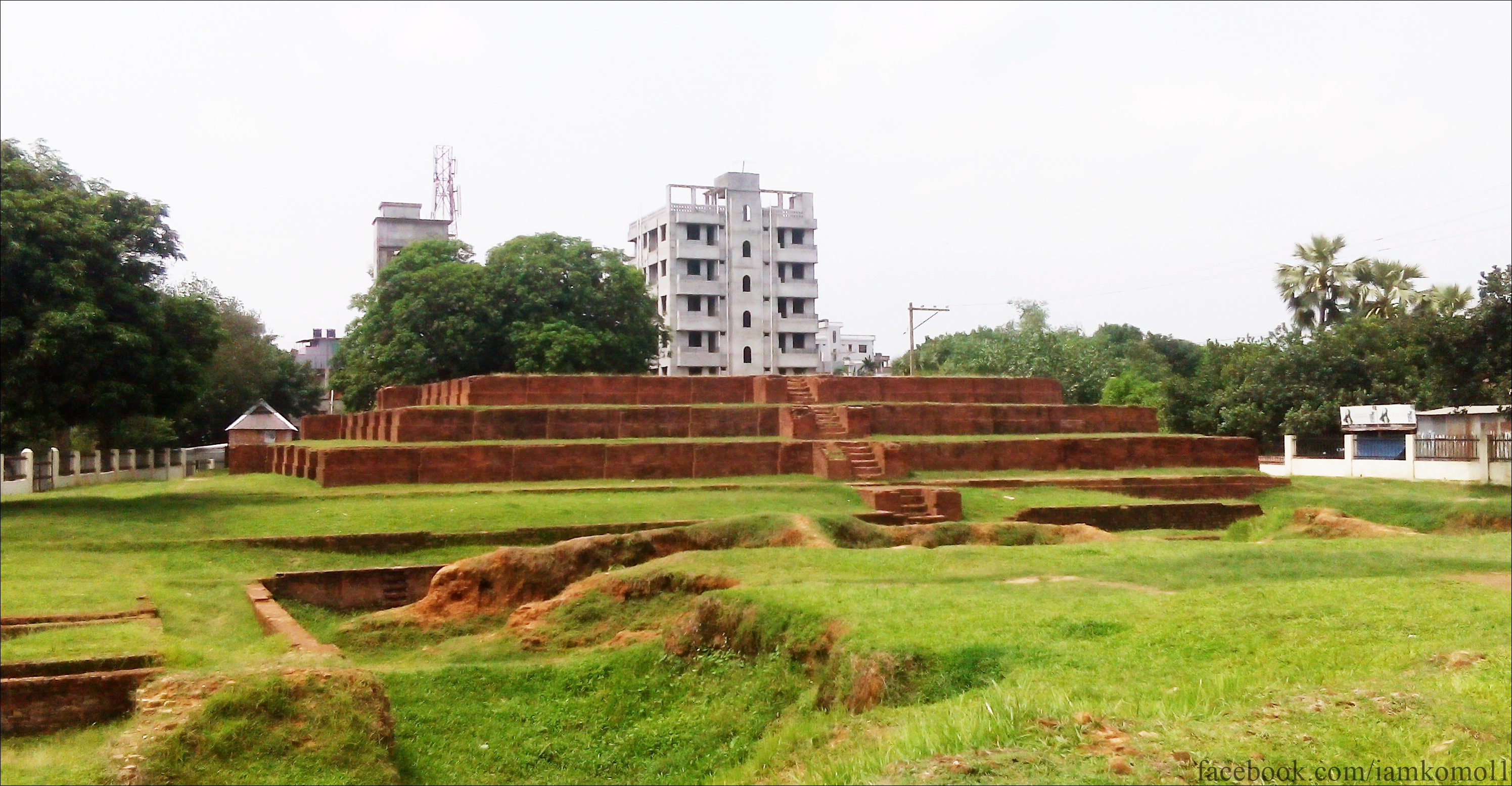
Palace of the King (ruin)

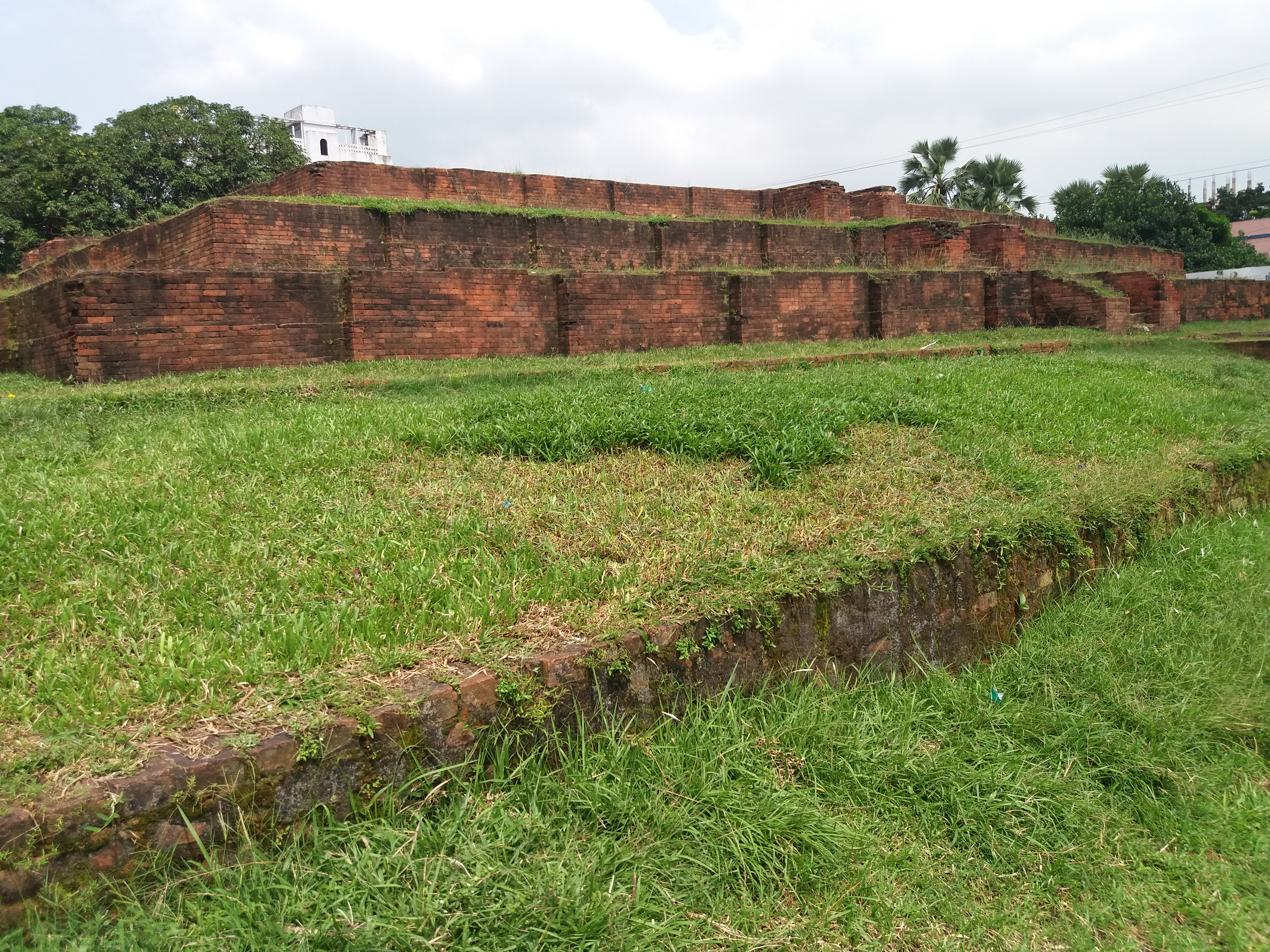
Palace view (destroyed)
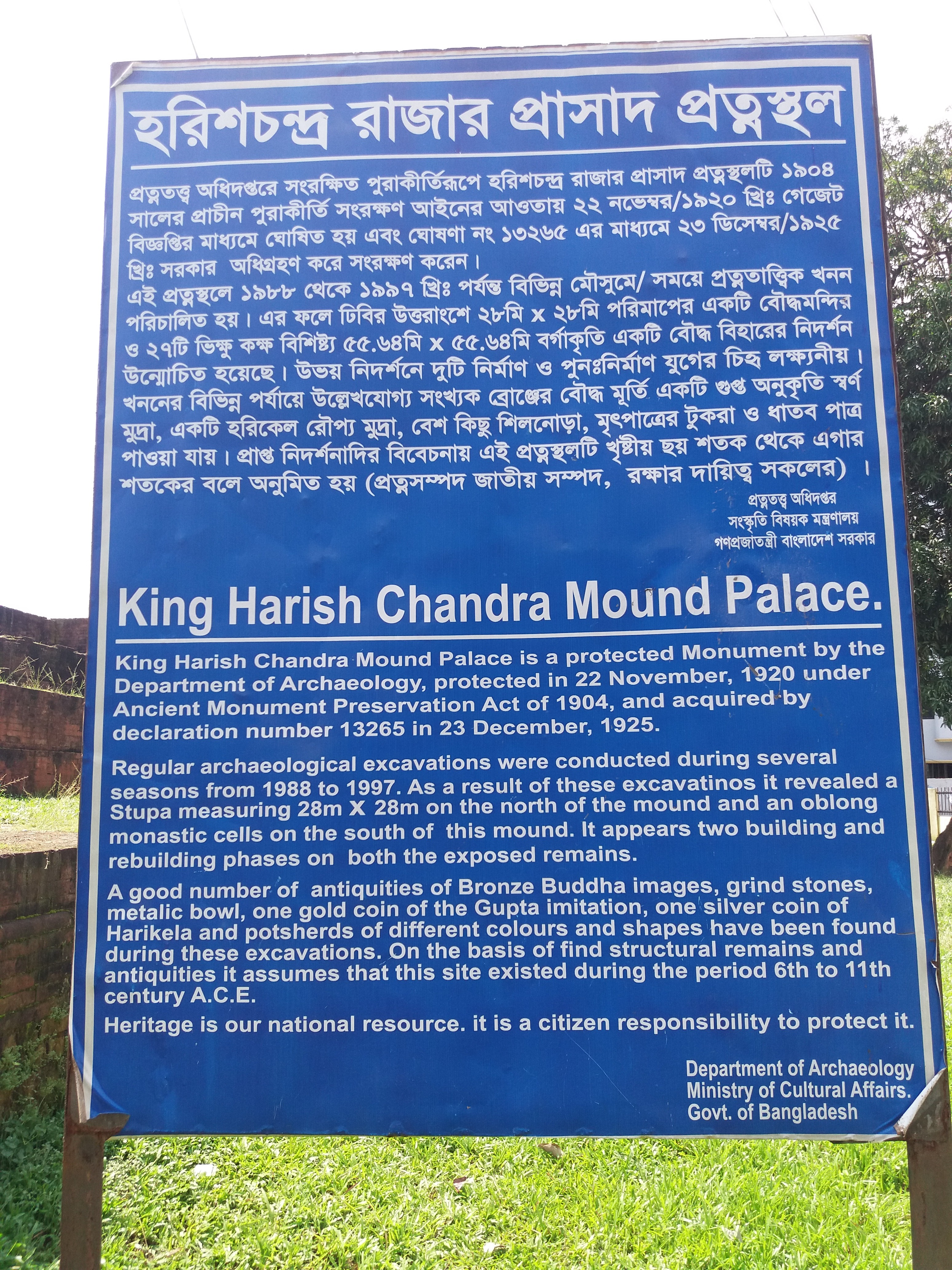
Harishchandra Palace (Notice)
