= Savar Cantonment =

Bangladeshi military quarters

Savar Cantonment
- Savar, Dhaka, Bangladesh
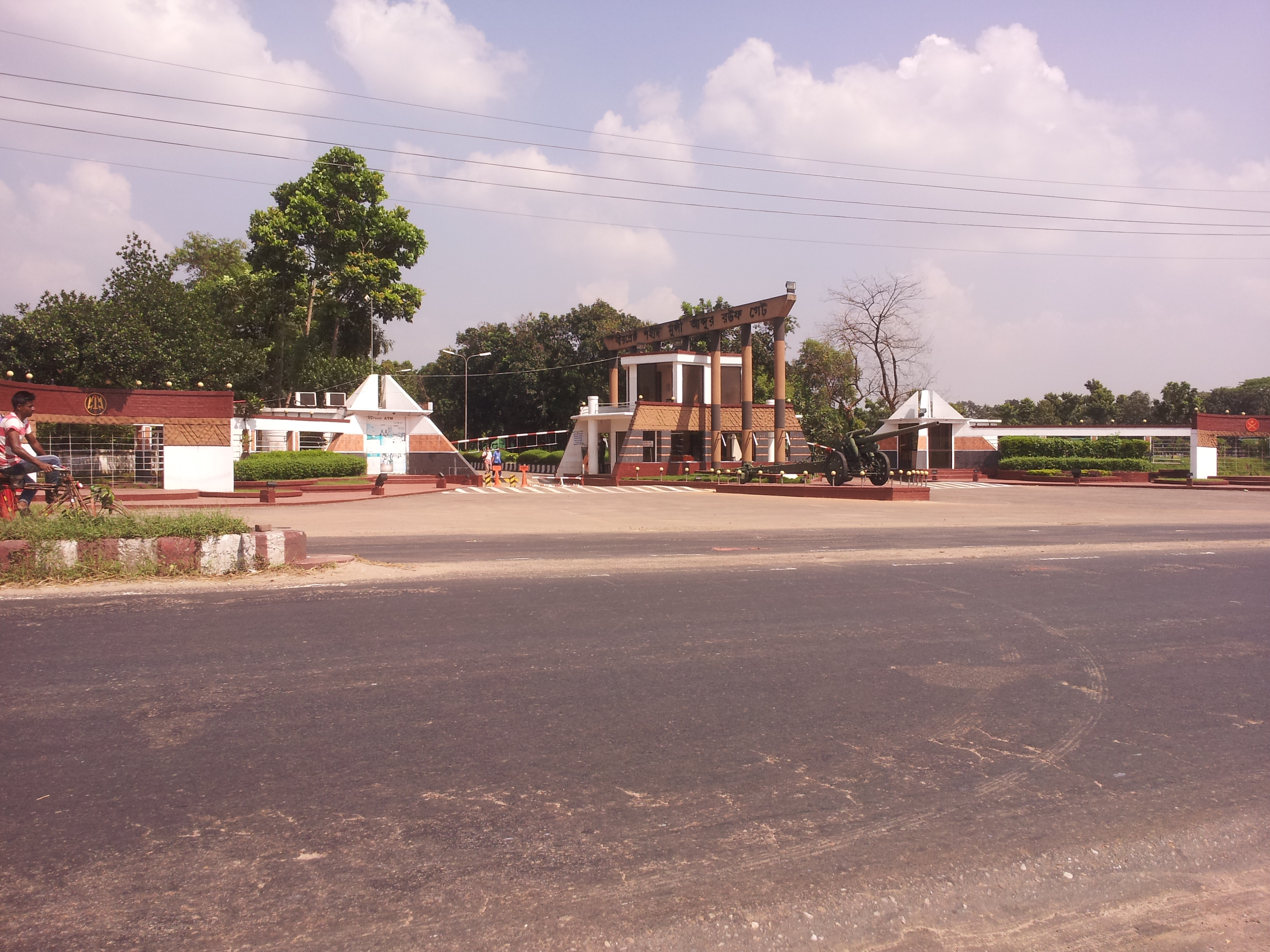

Site information
- Type: Military Base
- Controlled by: Bangladesh Army

Location
- Coordinates: 23.9140°N 90.2664°E

Site history
- In use: 1966 - 1971: East Pakistan Ansar; 1971 - 1976: National Defence Force; 1976 - present: Bangladesh Army

Garrison information
- Current commander: Major General Molla Mohammad Kamruzzaman
- Garrison: 9th Infantry Division

Savar Cantonment (Bengali: সাভার সেনানিবাস) is a cantonment of the Bangladesh Army located in Savar, Dhaka, Bangladesh. The 9th Infantry Division of the Bangladesh Army is garrisoned there. The Corps of Military Police Centre & School (CMPC&S), Army Institute of Business Administration (AIBA), Savar Golf Club (SGC), Savar DOHS and many more establishments are located in the cantonment.

== History ==
Before 1971, the area was recognized as Ansar Camp, and during the Bangladesh Liberation War, the camp was used by Razakar forces allied with the Pakistan Army. After independence, it was restructured into the main training center for Jatiya Rakkhi Bahini, a paramilitary force, which was absorbed into the Bangladesh Army in 1976. Since then, the area was repurposed as a cantonment of the Bangladesh Army.

== Installations ==
- HQ 9th Infantry Division
  - Area Headquarters, Savar
  - Station Headquarters, Savar
    - Combined Military Hospital
    - Military Dairy Farm, Savar
- Corps of Military Police Centre and School (CMPC&S)
- Cantonment Board, Savar

== Establishments ==
- Aranyaloy Mini Zoo, Savar
- Savar Golf Club (SGC)
- Savar Sena Shooting Club
- Sena Shopping Complex
- Sena Auditorium
- Savar DOHS

== Education ==
- Army Institute of Business Administration (AIBA)
- Morning Glory School and College
- Savar Cantonment Public School and College
- Sena Public School & College
- Savar Cantonment Board Boys High School
- Savar Cantonment Board Girls High School
- Proyash School, Savar
- Trust Technical Training Institute (TTTI)

=== Commercial area ===
- Sena Shopping Mall
- Dhaka-Aricha Bus Counter
- Dhaka-Rajshahi Bus Counter
