= Savar =

Savar সাভার
- City
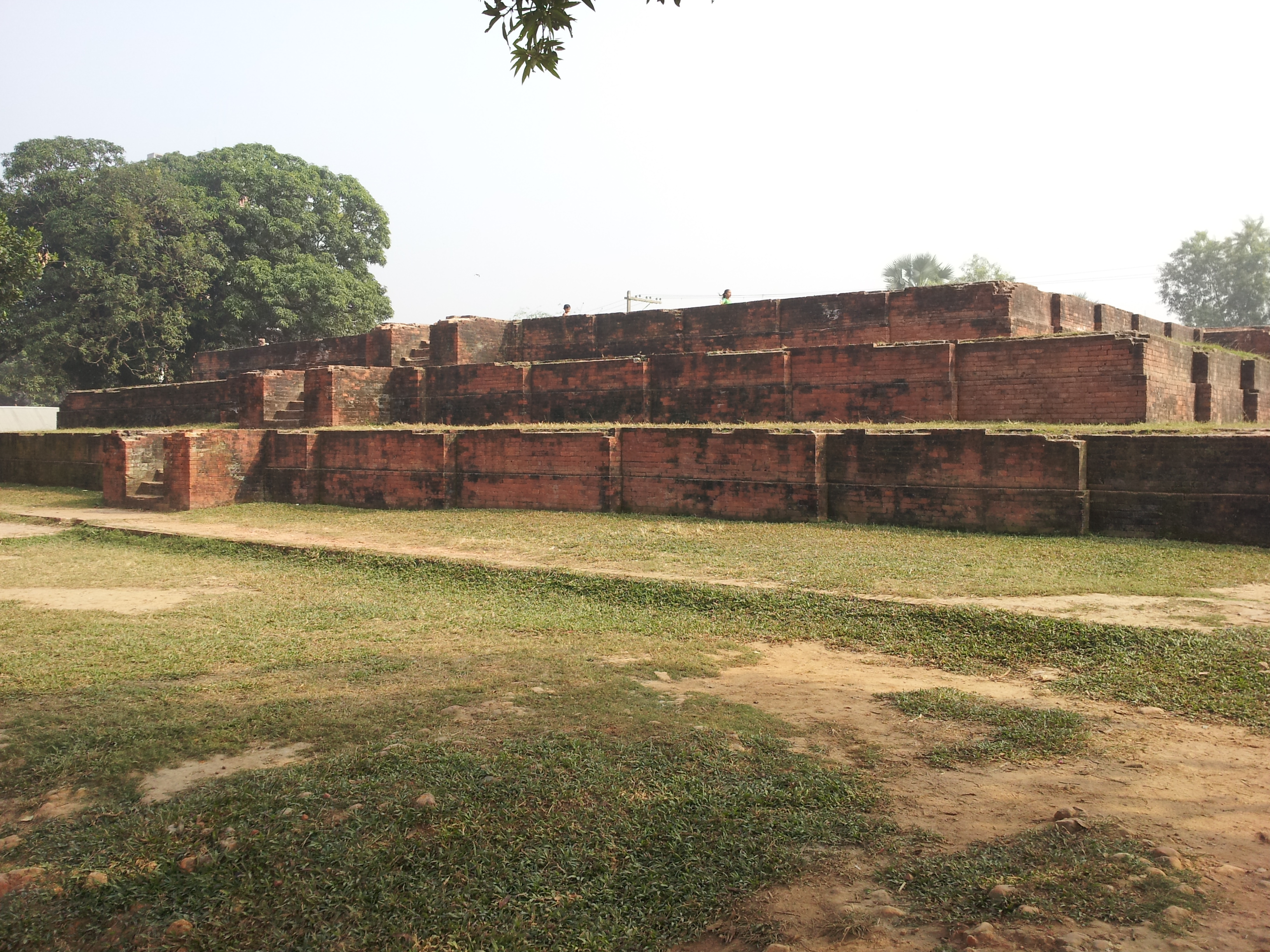
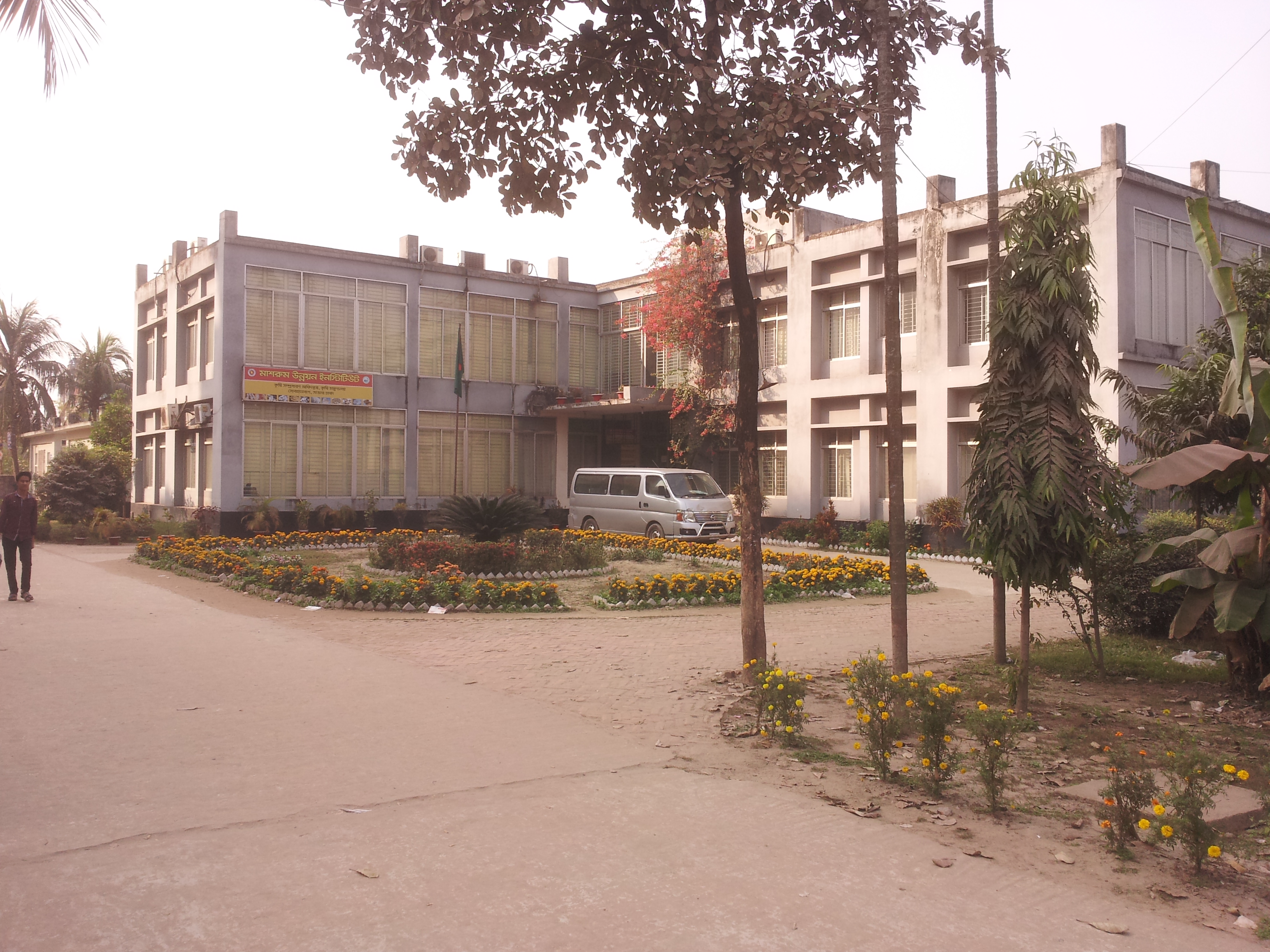
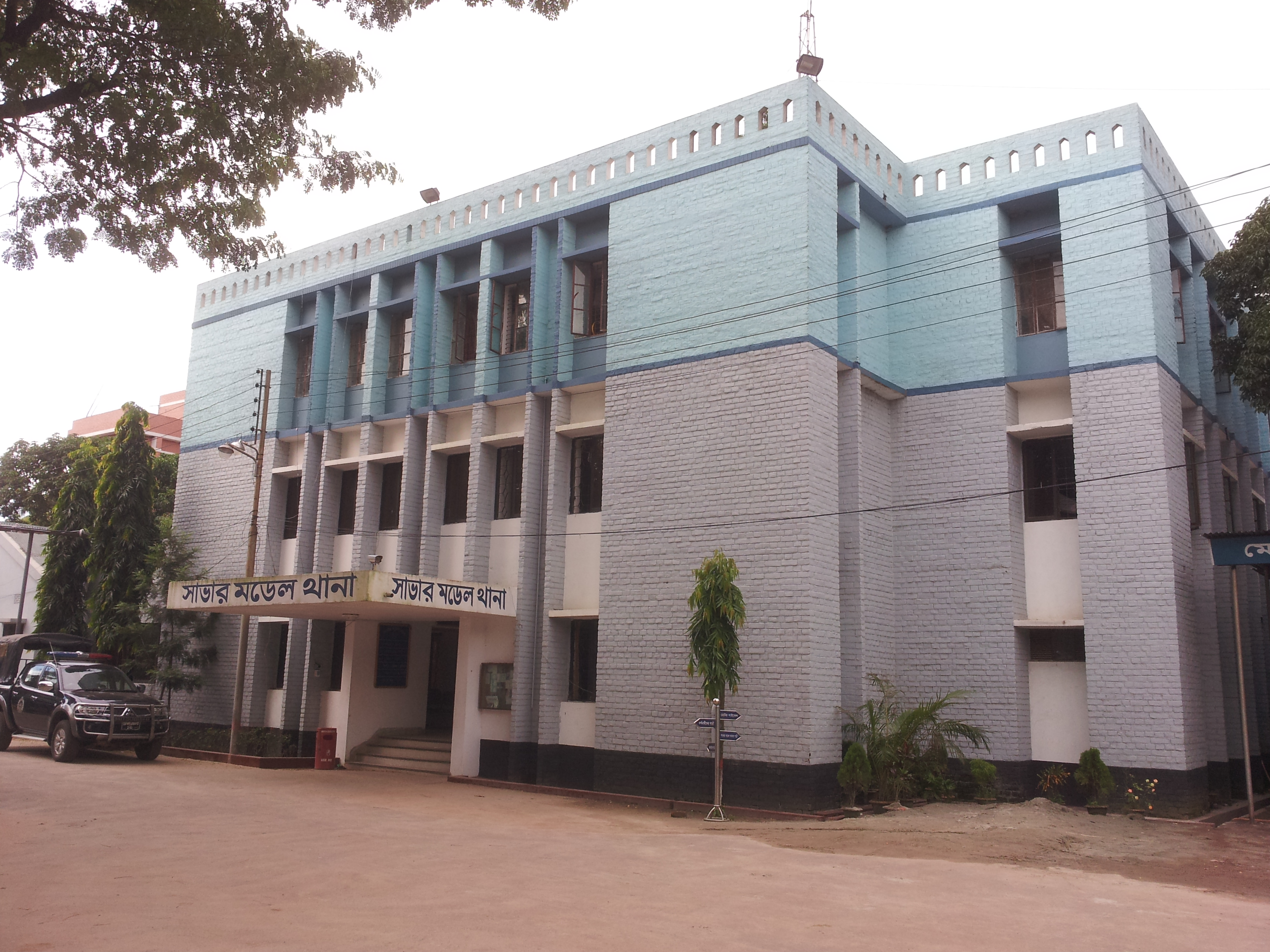
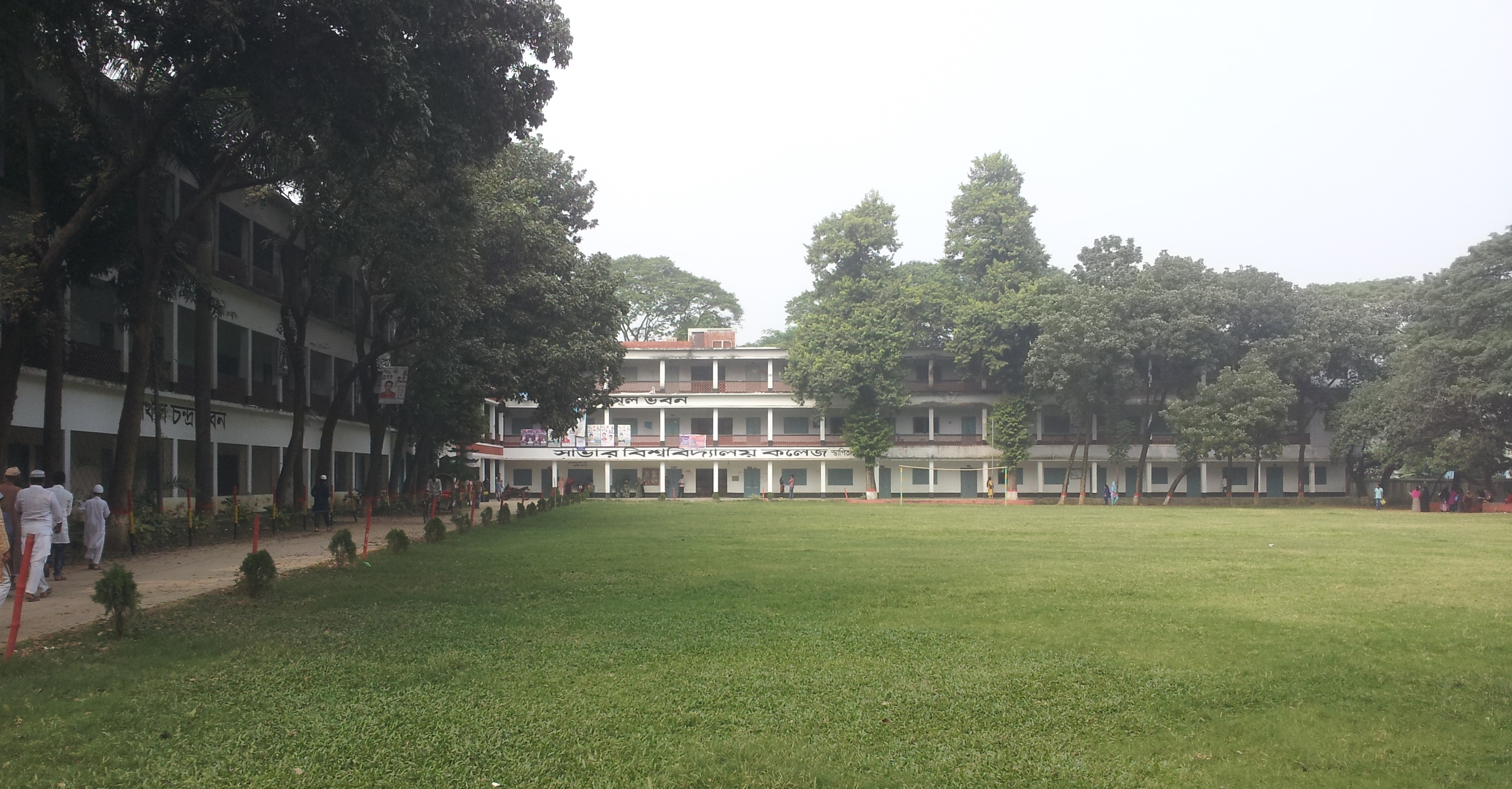
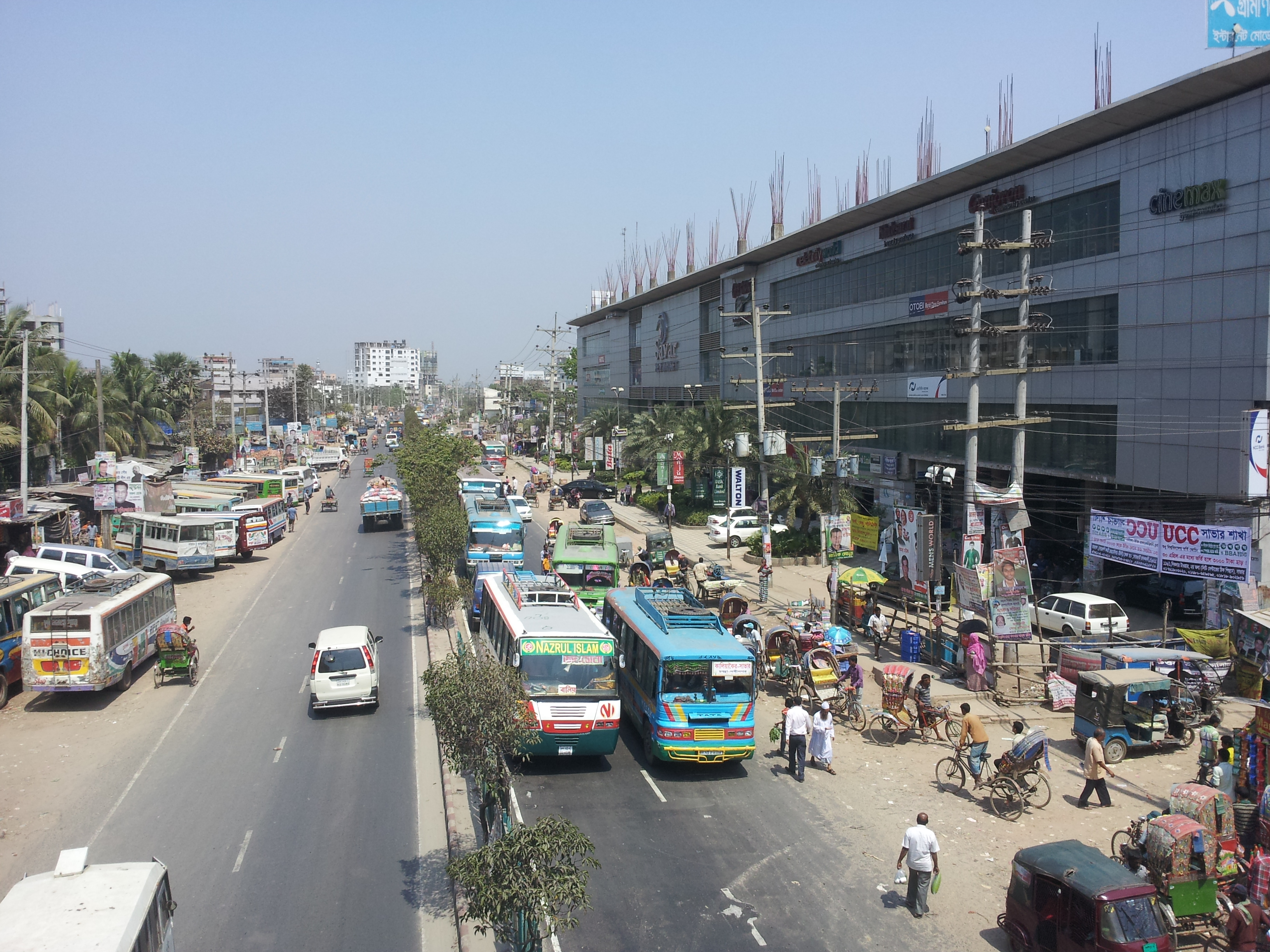
- Ruins of King Harishchandra's palace National Mushroom Development Institute Savar Police Station Savar University College [bn] Dhaka–Aricha highway

- Location in Bangladesh Savar (Bangladesh)
- Coordinates: 23.85°N 90.26°E
- Country: Bangladesh
- Division: Dhaka
- District: Dhaka
- Upazila: Savar
- Municipality: 7 Oct 2002

Government
  - Type: Mayor–Council
  - Body: Savar Municipality
  - Paura Mayor: Hazi Abdul Gani

Area
  - Total: 14.08 km^{2} (5.44 sq mi)

Population (2022)
  - Total: 384,105
  - Density: 27,280/km^{2} (70,660/sq mi)
  - Rank: 13th
- Time zone: UTC+6 (Bangladesh Time)
- Postal code: 1345
- National Dialing Code: +880

Savar Municipality mahallah geocode map

Savar (Bengali: সাভার) is a city in central Bangladesh, located in the Dhaka District in the division of Dhaka. It is the closest separate city to the centre of Dhaka. It is also a part of the Greater Dhaka conurbation which forms the Dhaka megacity. About 380,000 people live here which makes this city the second most populous in Dhaka district and the 13th largest in Bangladesh.

== Geography ==
Savar city is located at 23.85°N 90.26°E in the central region of Bangladesh.

== History ==
The origin of the name Savar is thought to be an evolved version of the ancient 7th–8th-century township of সর্বেশ্বর Shôrbeshshôr ("Lord of everything") or সম্ভার Shômbhar situated on the banks of the river known today as the Bangshi. Shôrbeshshôr, in turn, is said to have been established on the site of the ancient Sambagh Kingdom. Local legends as well as archaeological finds indicate a king by the name of Raja Harishchandra Pal, said to be of the Pala dynasty, ruled over Shôrbeshshôr. There is an old shloka that goes বংশাবতী-পূর্বতীরে সর্বেশ্বর নগরী, বৈসে রাজা হরিশচন্দ্র জিনি সূরপুরী Bôngshaboti-purbotire shôrbeshshôr nôgori, boishe raja Horishchôndro jini shurpuri ("On the East banks of the Bangsabati is the city of Sharbeshvar, lives there King Harishchandra conquering Heaven"). In any case, local legend holds that the childless Harishchandra was succeeded to the throne by his sister Rajeswari's son, Damodar. Damodar's reign started a decline for the kingdom, culminating in the reign of one of his descendants, king Ravan, a music enthusiast. During Ravan's reign, the Koch invaded and sacked the capital established by Harishchandra. However, inscriptions on an undated burnt brick fragment indicate king Mahendra in 869 CE dedicated a matha to his father, saint king Harishchandra, son of king Ranadhirasena, son of king Dhimantasena, son of king Bhimasena. The same inscription also states the Buddhist king Dhimantasena invaded and captured the land between the Bangshi and the Brahmaputra and king Ranadhirasena extended the kingdom to the Himalayas and fixed his residence in the city of Shômbhar.

During the 1971 war, Savar Cantonment (then Ansar Camp) and the then-newly founded Jahangirnagar University were some of the first targets of military swoop outside the capital following Operation Searchlight of 25 March. In December of that year, Savar was the last obstacle before the freedom fighters (led by Kader Siddiqui and others) entered the capital, and the Pakistan army conceded defeat. Days before the end of the war, teenager Golam Dastagir Titu was killed in a direct encounter between the Pakistani Army and the freedom fighters. The compatriots buried him near the main gate of the Central Cattle Breeding & Dairy Farm, Savar. The Bangladeshi Army constructed a memorial monument in his honour.

On 24 November 2012, a garment factory fire killed at least 112 people. The factory-made clothes for US and European companies were faulted for negligent safety standards. Walmart and Sears, two of the companies who contracted work from this factory, refused to compensate victims.

On 24 April 2013, a building in Savar collapsed, killing 1,129 people and injuring around 2,500. The building housed a garment factory that exported clothing to US and European companies. Eighty percent of the workers were women aged 18–20, paid $0.12-$0.26 per hour.

== Demographics ==
Religions in Savar (2022)
Religion	Percent
Islam	92.48%
Hinduism	6.70%
Christianity	0.78%
Other or not stated	0.04%

At the time of the 2022 census, Savar Paurashava had 113,484 households and a population of 384,105. 7.74% of the population was under 5 years of age. Savar had a sex ratio of 107.20 males per 100 females and a literacy rate of 86.00%: 87.75% for males and 84.12% for females.

== Administration ==
Savar is governed by a Paurashava named Savar municipality which consists of 9 wards and 56 mahallas, which occupies an area of 14.08 km^{2} (5.44 sq mi).

== See also ==
- National Martyrs' Memorial – National monument located in Savar, Bangladesh located in Savar
- Rana Plaza
